= Quintin Morris =

American football player (born 1999)

No. 80 – Jacksonville Jaguars
- Position: Tight end
- Roster status: Active

Personal information
- Born: January 21, 1999 (age 27); Richmond, Texas, U.S.
- Listed height: 6 ft 2 in (1.88 m)
- Listed weight: 243 lb (110 kg)

Career information
- High school: George Ranch (Richmond, Texas)
- College: Bowling Green (2017–2020)
- NFL draft: 2021: undrafted

Career history
- Buffalo Bills (2021–2024); Jacksonville Jaguars (2025–present)

Awards and highlights
- First-team All-MAC (2020); Second-team All-MAC (2019)

Career NFL statistics as of 2025
- Receptions: 21
- Receiving yards: 201
- Receiving touchdowns: 4
- Stats at Pro Football Reference

Quintin Morris (born January 21, 1999) is an American professional football tight end for the Jacksonville Jaguars of the National Football League (NFL). He played college football at Bowling Green, and signed with the Buffalo Bills in 2021 as an undrafted free agent.

== Early life ==
Morris attended George Ranch High School in Richmond, Texas. During his high school career, Morris suffered multiple injuries which hurt his recruiting. Ranked as a two-star recruit in 2016, Morris would commit to play at Bowling Green. He also received offers from Division I FBS schools Army, Navy and New Mexico. Morris also received offers from FCS schools Abilene Christian and Citadel.

== College career ==
Morris played for the Bowling Green Falcons for four seasons. He finished his collegiate career with 125 receptions for 1,529 yards and 13 touchdowns in 40 games played. As a junior in 2019, Morris caught a career high 10 receptions for 92 yards against Notre Dame. During the season, Morris was converted from wide receiver to tight end. He led the team with 55 receptions, 649 receiving yards, and four touchdown catches, being named Second Team All-MAC. The following COVID-shortened season, he played all five-games where he earned First Team All-MAC, becoming the first Bowling Green tight end named since 1991.

== Professional career ==
=== Pre-draft ===
Pre-draft measurables
Height	Weight	Arm length	Hand span	Wingspan	40-yard dash	10-yard split	20-yard split	20-yard shuttle	Three-cone drill	Vertical jump	Broad jump	Bench press
6 ft 2 1/4 in (1.89 m)	243 lb (110 kg)	33 1/8 in (0.84 m)	10 3/8 in (0.26 m)	6 ft 8 3/4 in (2.05 m)	4.66 s	1.62 s	2.70 s	4.65 s	7.09 s	34.0 in (0.86 m)	9 ft 11 in (3.02 m)	22 reps
All values from Pro Day

=== Buffalo Bills ===
Morris was signed by the Buffalo Bills as an undrafted free agent on May 1, 2021. He was waived during final roster cuts on August 31, but was signed to the team's practice squad the next day. Although on the practice squad for most of the year, Morris was elevated to the active roster on October 26, for the team's Week 9 game against the Jacksonville Jaguars but did not play during the game. After the Bills were eliminated in the Divisional Round of the 2021 playoffs, he signed a reserve/future contract on January 24, 2022.

Following the 2022 NFL preseason, Morris was named to the official 53-man roster listed as the backup tight end to Dawson Knox to begin the season, edging out former Buccaneers first-round pick O.J. Howard for a roster spot. On September 19, 2022, the Bills hosted the Tennessee Titans on Monday Night Football where Morris would make his National Football League debut. Morris finished the game with 28 offensive and 19 special teams snaps. Morris would haul in his first NFL reception from quarterback Josh Allen for six yards during the Bills 41–7 victory. In Week 5 against the Pittsburgh Steelers, Morris earned his first career start. Morris would have a career high three catches and 39 receiving yards in a 38–3 victory. In Week 15 against the Miami Dolphins, Morris would catch his first career NFL touchdown pass. In the first quarter, Allen would connect with Morris on a 14-yard touchdown. The Bills won the game 32–29, on a game winning 25-yard field goal from kicker Tyler Bass as time expired. He appeared in 14 games and started one as a rookie. He had eight receptions for 84 yards and a touchdown on the season.

Entering the 2023 season, Morris was listed as the third-string tight end, remaining primarily on special teams. On October 15, 2023, Morris caught the go-ahead touchdown pass to lift the Bills to a 14–9 win over the New York Giants. After the game, Morris was praised by Bills fans and head coach Sean McDermott for helping the team win despite having an injured ankle, along with other injuries on the team. The following two weeks, Morris sat out due to his ankle injury. He appeared in 15 games in the 2023 season, with two receptions, 26 yards, and one touchdown. On March 8, Morris signed a one-year contract with the Bills.

Entering the 2024 season, Morris was listed as the third-string tight end for the second year in a row.

=== Jacksonville Jaguars ===
On May 14, 2025, the Jacksonville Jaguars signed Morris to a one-year contract. He was released on August 26 as part of final roster cuts. Morris was signed to the practice squad on August 27. He was promoted to the active roster on October 6.

On March 5, 2026, Morris re-signed with the Jaguars.

== Career statistics ==
=== NFL ===
==== Regular season ====
Year	Team	Games		Receiving					Fumbles	
Year	Team	GP	GS	Rec	Yds	Y/R	Lng	TD	Fum	Lost
2021	BUF	0	0	DNP						
2022	BUF	14	1	8	84	10.5	26	1	1	1
2023	BUF	15	0	2	26	13.0	15	1	0	0
2024	BUF	16	3	5	36	7.2	14	1	0	0
2025	JAX	14	5	6	55	9.2	14	1	0	0
Career		59	9	21	201	9.6	26	4	1	1

==== Postseason ====
Year	Team	Games		Receiving					Fumbles	
Year	Team	GP	GS	Rec	Yds	Y/R	Lng	TD	Fum	Lost
2021	BUF	0	0	DNP						
2022	BUF	2	1	2	18	9.0	12	0	0	0
2023	BUF	2	0	0	0	0	0	0	0	0
2024	BUF	3	0	0	0	0	0	0	0	0
2025	JAX	1	0	0	0	0	0	0	0	0
Career		8	1	2	18	9.0	12	0	0	0

=== College ===
Season	Team	Games		Receiving			
Season	Team	GP	GS	Rec	Yds	Avg	TD
2017	Bowling Green	11	0	8	116	14.5	2
2018	Bowling Green	12	11	42	516	12.3	7
2019	Bowling Green	12	12	55	649	11.8	4
2020	Bowling Green	5	5	20	248	12.4	0
Career		40	28	125	1,529	12.2	13
