= 2022 Buffalo Bills season =

63rd season in franchise history

- Owner: Terry and Kim Pegula
- General manager: Brandon Beane
- Head coach: Sean McDermott
- Offensive coordinator: Ken Dorsey
- Defensive coordinator: Leslie Frazier
- Home stadium: Highmark Stadium; Ford Field (Note: Due to public safety concerns regarding a severe winter storm in the Buffalo area, the Bills' Week 11 game vs. the Cleveland Browns was relocated to Detroit's Ford Field.)

Results
- Record: 13–3
- Division place: 1st AFC East
- Playoffs: Won Wild Card Playoffs (vs. Dolphins) 34–31; Lost Divisional Playoffs (vs. Bengals) 10–27
- All-Pros: 2: OLB Matt Milano (1st team); WR Stefon Diggs (2nd team)
- Pro Bowlers: 8: QB Josh Allen; WR Stefon Diggs; TE Dawson Knox; T Dion Dawkins; G Rodger Saffold; C Mitch Morse; OLB Matt Milano; SS Jordan Poyer

Uniform
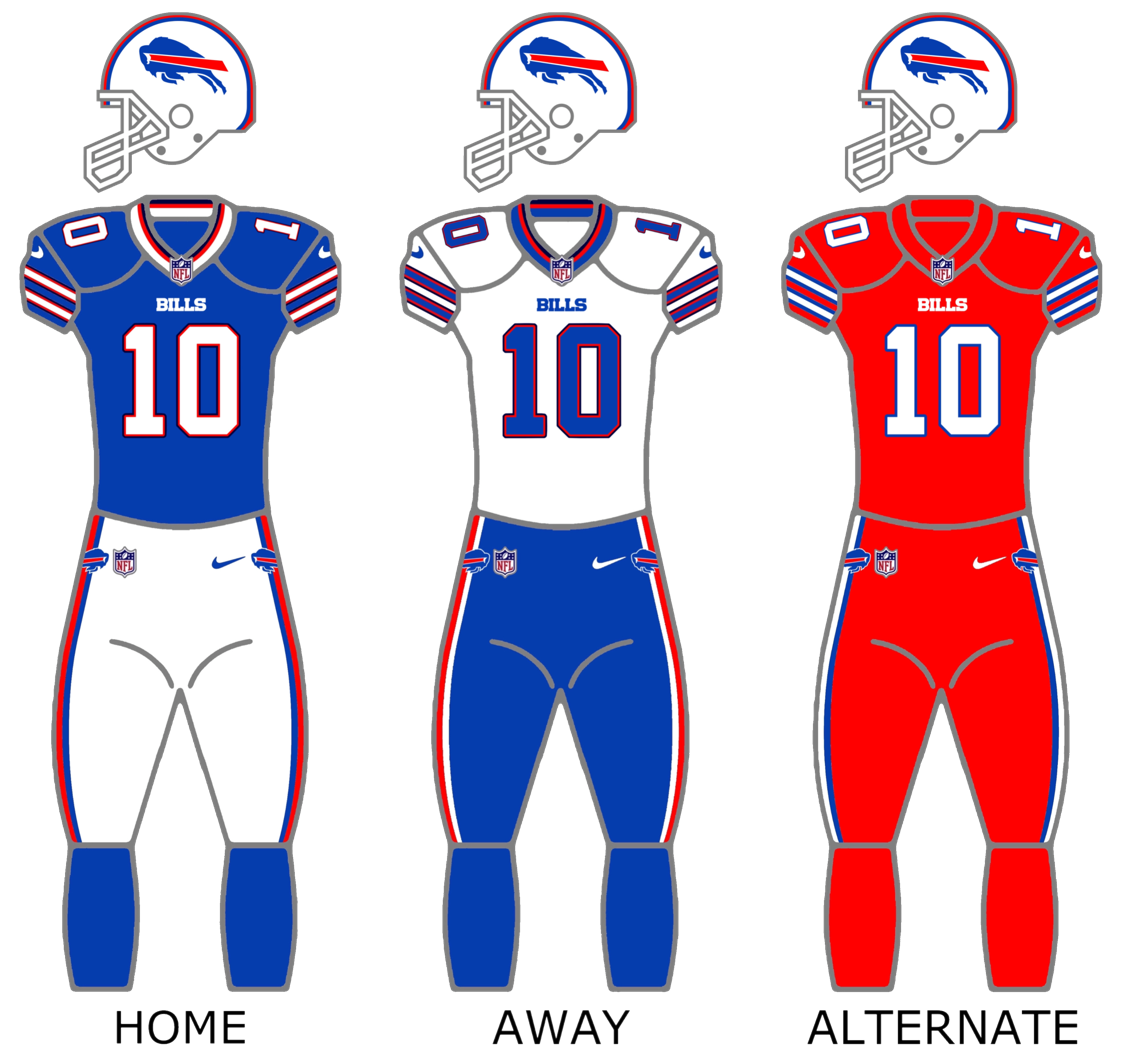

The 2022 season was the Buffalo Bills' 63rd in the National Football League (NFL), their 63rd as a franchise, their eighth full season under the ownership of Terry and Kim Pegula, and their sixth under the head coach/general manager tandem of Sean McDermott and Brandon Beane.

The Bills entered the 2022 season as two-time defending AFC East champions. The Bills clinched the AFC East for the third season in a row and improved on their 11–6 record from last season. The Week 17 game against Cincinnati was declared a no-contest after Bills' safety Damar Hamlin collapsed on the field. He was given CPR for ten minutes before being rushed to the hospital. Despite the incident, the Bills won their last game of the season to finish 13–3, tied for the best record in the history of the franchise, but they lost control of their destiny to clinch the number 1 seed in the AFC as a result of the cancellation, which allowed Kansas City to clinch the number 1 seed in the AFC the day before their last game of the regular season despite having the head-to-head tiebreaker. In the playoffs, they defeated Miami, 34–31 in the wild-card round. However, they then fell to Cincinnati 27–10, losing in the divisional round for the second consecutive season.

2022 was the final season in the Bills' lease on Highmark Stadium signed back in 2012. Negotiations were finalized and approved for the construction of a new stadium for the team by May 2023, with construction beginning afterwards with a completion date before the 2026 season; the team had stated that it would not renew its lease on Highmark Stadium unless an agreement for a new stadium was struck by the end of the 2022 season.

== Transactions ==
=== Arrivals ===
Position	Player	2021 team(s)	Date signed	Notes
G	Rodger Saffold	Tennessee Titans	March 14, 2022	1 year / $6.25 million
DT	DaQuan Jones	Carolina Panthers	March 16, 2022	2 years / $14 million
LB	Von Miller	Denver Broncos / Los Angeles Rams	March 16, 2022	6 years / $120 million
DT	Tim Settle	Washington Football Team	March 17, 2022	2 years / $9 million
DT	Jordan Phillips	Arizona Cardinals	March 17, 2022	1 year / $5 million
DE	Shaq Lawson	New York Jets	March 18, 2022	1 year / $1.1875 million
QB	Matt Barkley	Tennessee Titans / Carolina Panthers / Atlanta Falcons	March 21, 2022	1 year / $1.145 million
C	Greg Mancz	Miami Dolphins	March 21, 2022	1 year / $1.2725 million
WR	Jamison Crowder	New York Jets	March 22, 2022	1 year / $2 million
RB	Duke Johnson	Miami Dolphins	March 22, 2022	1 year / $1.2725 million
T	David Quessenberry	Tennessee Titans	April 21, 2022	1 year / $1.75 million
WR	Tavon Austin	Jacksonville Jaguars	June 2, 2022	1 year / $1.12 million
G	Greg Van Roten	New York Jets	June 13, 2022	1 year / $1.2725 million
P	Sam Martin	Denver Broncos	August 31, 2022	1 year / $1.2725 million
T	Justin Murray	Arizona Cardinals	September 27, 2022	1 year / $1.035 million
CB	Xavier Rhodes	Indianapolis Colts	September 28, 2022	1 year / $ .2772 million
FS	Jared Mayden	Philadelphia Eagles	October 10, 2022	1 year / $ .207 million
WR	John Brown	Las Vegas Raiders / Denver Broncos / Jacksonville Jaguars / Tampa Bay Buccaneers	November 26, 2022	1 year / $ .3582 million

=== Departures ===
Position	Player	2022 team	Date signed	Notes
RB	Antonio Williams	New York Giants	January 27, 2022	2 years / $1.585 million
QB	Davis Webb	New York Giants	February 7, 2022	1 year / $ .945 million
DT	Harrison Phillips	Minnesota Vikings	March 16, 2022	3 years / $19.5 million
G	Jon Feliciano	New York Giants	March 16, 2022	1 year / $3.25 million
QB	Mitchell Trubisky	Pittsburgh Steelers	March 17, 2022	2 years / $14.285 million
CB	Levi Wallace	Pittsburgh Steelers	March 17, 2022	2 years / $8 million
RB	Matt Breida	New York Giants	March 21, 2022	1 year / $1.1875 million
DE	Efe Obada	Washington Commanders	March 23, 2022	1 year / $1.1875 million
DE	Mario Addison	Houston Texans	May 10, 2022	2 years / $7.7 million
DE	Jerry Hughes	Houston Texans	May 11, 2022	2 years / $10 million
P	Matt Haack	Indianapolis Colts	August 24, 2022	1 year / $1.035 million
CB	Nick McCloud	New York Giants	August 31, 2022	2 years / $1.765 million
FS	Josh Thomas	Arizona Cardinals	September 1, 2022	1 year / $ .207 million
WR	Isaiah Hodgins	New York Giants	November 2, 2022	2 years / $1.575 million
DT	Justin Zimmer	Miami Dolphins	November 23, 2022	1 year / $1.035 million
WR	Marquez Stevenson	Cleveland Browns	December 14, 2022	1 year / $ .207 million
CB	Xavier Rhodes	Dallas Cowboys	January 7, 2023	1 year / $ .3582 million
T	Daryl Williams	—	Free Agent	Released March 14, 2022
DT	Vernon Butler	—	Free agent	Contract Expired March 16, 2022
DE	Bryan Cox Jr.	—	Free agent	Contract Expired March 16, 2022
DT	Star Lotulelei	—	Free agent	Released March 18, 2022
WR	Emmanuel Sanders	—	Retired	Retired September 7, 2022
WR	Tavon Austin	—	Free agent	Released October 5, 2022
LB	Andre Smith	—	Free agent	Released October 17, 2022
WR	Tanner Gentry	—	Free agent	Released January 17, 2023
LB	Joe Giles-Harris	—	Free agent	Released January 17, 2023

=== Trades ===
Position	Arrived	From	Date of trade	Departed	
QB	Case Keenum	Cleveland Browns	March 20, 2022	7th-round pick	
G	2023 5th-round pick	Arizona Cardinals	August 22, 2022	Cody Ford	
RB	Nyheim Hines	Indianapolis Colts	November 1, 2022	Zack Moss	2023 Conditional 6th-round pick
FS	Dean Marlowe	Atlanta Falcons	November 1, 2022	2023 7th-round pick	

=== Draft ===
2022 Buffalo Bills Draft
Round	Selection	Player	Position	College	Notes
1	23	Kaiir Elam	CB	Florida	from Ravens (Note: The Bills traded first- and fourth-round selections (25th and 130th overall) to the Baltimore Ravens in exchange for a first-round selection (23rd overall).)
1	25	Traded to the Baltimore Ravens			
2	57	Traded to the Tampa Bay Buccaneers (Note: The Bills traded a second-round selection (57th overall) to the Tampa Bay Buccaneers in exchange for second- and sixth-round selections (60th and 180th overall).)			
2	60	Traded to the Cincinnati Bengals (Note: The Bills traded a second-round selection (60th overall) to the Cincinnati Bengals in exchange for second- and sixth-round selections (63rd and 209th overall).)			from Buccaneers
2	63	James Cook	RB	Georgia	from Bengals
3	89	Terrel Bernard	LB	Baylor	
4	130	Traded to the Baltimore Ravens			
5	148	Khalil Shakir	WR	Boise State	from Bears (Note: The Bills traded fifth- and sixth-round selections (168th and 203rd overall) to the Chicago Bears in exchange for a fifth-round selection (148th overall).)
5	168	Traded to the Chicago Bears			
6	180	Matt Araiza	P	San Diego State	from Buccaneers
6	185	Christian Benford	CB	Villanova	from Panthers (Note: The Bills traded DE Darryl Johnson to the Carolina Panthers in exchange for a sixth-round selection (185th overall).)
6	203	Traded to the Chicago Bears			
6	209	Luke Tenuta	OT	Virginia Tech	from Bengals
7	231	Baylon Spector	LB	Clemson	from Falcons (Note: The Bills traded TE Lee Smith to the Atlanta Falcons in exchange for a seventh-round selection (231st overall).)
7	246	Traded to the Cleveland Browns (Note: The Bills traded a seventh-round selection (246th overall) to the Cleveland Browns in exchange for QB Case Keenum.)			

Draft trades

== Undrafted free agents ==
2022 Buffalo Bills Undrafted Free Agents
Name	Position	College	Ref.
Alec Anderson	OT	UCLA	
Raheem Blackshear	RB	Virginia Tech	
C. J. Brewer	DT	Coastal Carolina	
Prince Emili	DT	Penn	
Travon Fuller	CB	Tulsa	
Ja'Marcus Ingram	CB	Buffalo	
Kingsley Jonathan	DE	Syracuse	
Derek Kerstetter	OT	Texas	
Tanner Owen	OT	Northwest Missouri State	
Neil Pau'u	WR	BYU	
Will Ulmer	OT	Marshall	
Malik Williams	WR	Appalachian State	
Jalen Wydermyer	TE	Texas A&M	

== Staff ==
2022 Buffalo Bills staff
Front office: Owner/CEO – Terry Pegula; Owner/president – Kim Pegula; General manager – Brandon Beane; Assistant general manager – Brian Gaine; Director of player personnel – Terrance Gray; Senior advisor to the GM/football operations – Jim Overdorf; Assistant director of college scouting – Lake Dawson; Senior director of pro scouting – Malik Boyd; Assistant director of pro scouting/team advances – Chris Marrow; Assistant director of pro scouting/free agency – Curtis Rukavina; Vice president of football administration – Kevin Meganck; Director of football operations – Brendan Rowe; Senior personnel Executive – Matt Bazirgan; Head coaches: Head coach – Sean McDermott; Assistant head coach/defensive coordinator – Leslie Frazier; Offensive coaches: Offensive coordinator – Ken Dorsey; Quarterbacks – Joe Brady; Assistant quarterbacks/game management – Marc Lubick; Running backs – Kelly Skipper; Wide receivers – Chad Hall; Tight ends – Rob Boras; Offensive line – Aaron Kromer; Assistant offensive line – Ryan Wendell; Senior offensive assistant – Mike Shula; Offensive quality control – Austin Gund	Defensive coaches: Senior defensive assistant/defensive line – Eric Washington; Assistant defensive line – Marcus West; Linebackers – Bobby Babich; Defensive backs/passing game coordinator – John Butler; Safeties – Jim Salgado; Defensive quality control – Jaylon Finner; Defensive quality control – Kyle Shurmur; Special teams coaches: Special teams coordinator – Matthew Smiley; Assistant special teams – Cory Harkey; Strength and conditioning: Head strength and conditioning – Eric Ciano; Assistant strength and conditioning – Hal Luther; Assistant strength and conditioning – Will Greenberg; Strength and conditioning assistant – Jason Oszvart; Strength and conditioning assistant – Nick Lacy

== Final roster ==
2022 Buffalo Bills roster
Quarterbacks (QB): 17 Josh Allen; 18 Case Keenum; Running backs (RB): 28 James Cook; 41 Reggie Gilliam; 20 Nyheim Hines; 25 Taiwan Jones; 26 Devin Singletary; Wide receivers (WR): 11 Cole Beasley; 13 Gabe Davis; 14 Stefon Diggs; 6 Isaiah McKenzie; 10 Khalil Shakir; Tight ends (TE): 88 Dawson Knox; 85 Quintin Morris; 89 Tommy Sweeney	Offensive linemen (OL): 71 Ryan Bates G/C; 65 Ike Boettger G; 79 Spencer Brown T; 73 Dion Dawkins T; 68 Bobby Hart G/T; 60 Mitch Morse C; 77 David Quessenberry T; 76 Rodger Saffold G; 75 Greg Van Roten G/C; Defensive linemen (DL): 55 Boogie Basham DE; 57 A. J. Epenesa DE; 92 DaQuan Jones DT; 90 Shaq Lawson DE; 91 Ed Oliver DT; 97 Jordan Phillips DT; 50 Greg Rousseau DE; 99 Tim Settle DT	Linebackers (LB): 43 Terrel Bernard OLB; 53 Tyrel Dodson MLB; 49 Tremaine Edmunds MLB; 52 A. J. Klein OLB; 44 Tyler Matakevich MLB; 58 Matt Milano OLB; 54 Baylon Spector OLB; Defensive backs (DB): 47 Christian Benford CB; 24 Kaiir Elam CB; 30 Dane Jackson CB; 4 Jaquan Johnson SS; 7 Taron Johnson CB; 39 Cam Lewis CB; 31 Dean Marlowe FS; 36 Jared Mayden FS; 33 Siran Neal CB; 21 Jordan Poyer SS; 27 Tre'Davious White CB; Special teams (ST): 2 Tyler Bass K; 69 Reid Ferguson LS; 8 Sam Martin P	Practice squad: 70 Alec Anderson G (PS/I); 51 Eli Ankou DT; 5 Matt Barkley QB; 94 Cortez Broughton DT; 16 John Brown WR; 96 Brandin Bryant DT; 84 Zach Davidson TE; 46 Ja'Marcus Ingram CB; 22 Duke Johnson RB; 81 KeeSean Johnson WR; 59 Kingsley Jonathan DE; 56 Mike Love DE; 62 Greg Mancz C; 32 Kyler McMichael CB; 67 Justin Murray G/T; 19 Dezmon Patmon WR; 74 Ryan Van Demark T; Reserve: 80 Jamison Crowder WR (IR/DFR); 72 Tommy Doyle T (IR); 3 Damar Hamlin FS (IR); 23 Micah Hyde FS (IR/DFR); 15 Jake Kumerow WR (IR); 40 Von Miller DE (IR); Rookies in italics 53 active, 6 reserve, 16 practice squad (1 exempt)

== Preseason ==
The Bills' preseason opened with a last-second win against Indianapolis, after trailing 24–10 late in the 4th quarter. This extended their preseason win streak to a record 9 games. Following a Week 2 win over Denver, their streak ended at 10 games with a loss in Week 3 to Carolina.

Week	Date	Opponent	Result	Record	Venue	Recap
1	August 13	Indianapolis Colts	W 27–24	1–0	Highmark Stadium	Recap
2	August 20	Denver Broncos	W 42–15	2–0	Highmark Stadium	Recap
3	August 26	at Carolina Panthers	L 0–21	2–1	Bank of America Stadium	Recap

== Regular season ==
On May 9, the NFL announced that the Bills would host the Tennessee Titans at 7:15 p.m. ET on September 19, as part of ESPN's Week 2 Monday Night doubleheader.

The remainder of the Bills' 2022 schedule was announced on May 12.

=== Schedule ===
Week	Date	Opponent	Result	Record	Venue	Recap
1	September 8	at Los Angeles Rams	**W** 31–10	1–0	SoFi Stadium	Recap
2	September 19	Tennessee Titans	**W** 41–7	2–0	Highmark Stadium	Recap
3	September 25	at **Miami Dolphins**	**L** 19–21	2–1	Hard Rock Stadium	Recap
4	October 2	at Baltimore Ravens	**W** 23–20	3–1	M&T Bank Stadium	Recap
5	October 9	Pittsburgh Steelers	**W** 38–3	4–1	Highmark Stadium	Recap
6	October 16	at Kansas City Chiefs	**W** 24–20	5–1	Arrowhead Stadium	Recap
7	Bye					
8	October 30	Green Bay Packers	**W** 27–17	6–1	Highmark Stadium	Recap
9	November 6	at **New York Jets**	**L** 17–20	6–2	MetLife Stadium	Recap
10	November 13	Minnesota Vikings	**L** 30–33 (OT)	6–3	Highmark Stadium	Recap
11	November 20	Cleveland Browns	**W** 31–23	7–3	Ford Field	Recap
12	November 24	at Detroit Lions	**W** 28–25	8–3	Ford Field	Recap
13	December 1	at **New England Patriots**	**W** 24–10	9–3	Gillette Stadium	Recap
14	December 11	**New York Jets**	**W** 20–12	10–3	Highmark Stadium	Recap
15	December 17	**Miami Dolphins**	**W** 32–29	11–3	Highmark Stadium	Recap
16	December 24	at Chicago Bears	**W** 35–13	12–3	Soldier Field	Recap
17	January 2 (Note: Game started on January 2. Due to an injury involving Damar Hamlin, the game was postponed part way through the first quarter. On January 5, the game was cancelled.)	at Cincinnati Bengals	No contest			
18	January 8	**New England Patriots**	**W** 35–23	13–3	Highmark Stadium	Recap

Note: Intra-division opponents are in bold text.

=== Game summaries ===
==== Week 1: at Los Angeles Rams ====
NFL Kickoff Game

Week 1: Buffalo Bills at Los Angeles Rams – Game summary

Quarter	1	2	3	4	Total
**Bills**	7	3	7	14	**31**
Rams	0	10	0	0	**10**

at SoFi Stadium, Inglewood, California

- Date: September 8
- Game time: 8:20 p.m. EDT/5:20 p.m. PDT
- Game weather: Cloudy, 88 °F (31 °C)
- Game attendance: 73,846
- Referee: Carl Cheffers
- TV announcers (NBC): Mike Tirico, Cris Collinsworth and Melissa Stark
- Recap, Game Book

Game information

**First quarter**

- BUF – Gabe Davis 26-yard pass from Josh Allen (Tyler Bass kick), 9:56. Bills 7–0. **Drive: 9 plays, 75 yards, 5:04.**

**Second quarter**

- BUF – Tyler Bass 41-yard field goal, 8:48. Bills 10–0. **Drive: 8 plays, 45 yards, 4:07.**
- LAR – Cooper Kupp 4-yard pass from Matthew Stafford (Matt Gay kick), 3:00. Bills 10–7. **Drive: 11 plays, 60 yards, 5:48.**
- LAR – Matt Gay 57-yard field goal, 0:00. Tied 10–10. **Drive: 8 plays, 6 yards, 1:53.**

**Third quarter**

- BUF – Isaiah McKenzie 7-yard pass from Josh Allen (Tyler Bass kick), 7:59. Bills 17–10. **Drive: 8 plays, 58 yards, 5:03.**

**Fourth quarter**

- BUF – Josh Allen 4-yard run (Tyler Bass kick), 13:27. Bills 24–10. **Drive: 13 plays, 89 yards, 6:44.**
- BUF – Stefon Diggs 53-yard pass from Josh Allen (Tyler Bass kick), 9:25. Bills 31–10. **Drive: 3 plays, 59 yards, 1:36.**

**Top passers**

- BUF – Josh Allen – 26/31, 297 yards, 3 TD, 2 INT
- LAR – Matthew Stafford – 29/41, 240 yards, TD, 3 INT

**Top rushers**

- BUF – Josh Allen – 10 rushes, 56 yards, TD
- LAR – Darrell Henderson – 13 rushes, 47 yards

**Top receivers**

- BUF – Stefon Diggs – 8 receptions, 122 yards, TD
- LAR – Cooper Kupp – 13 receptions, 128 yards, TD

The Bills put up 31 points over the defending Super Bowl champions in a primetime win. Josh Allen had 4 total touchdowns while Matthew Stafford was held to just 1.

==== Week 2: vs. Tennessee Titans ====
Week 2: Tennessee Titans at Buffalo Bills – Game summary

Quarter	1	2	3	4	Total
Titans	7	0	0	0	**7**
**Bills**	7	10	24	0	**41**

at Highmark Stadium, Orchard Park, New York

- Date: September 19
- Game time: 7:15 p.m. EDT
- Game weather: Partly cloudy, 70 °F (21 °C)
- Game attendance: 70,683
- Referee: Shawn Smith
- TV announcers (WGRZ/ESPN): Steve Levy, Louis Riddick, Dan Orlovsky and Laura Rutledge
- Recap, Game Book

Game information

**First quarter**

- BUF – Reggie Gilliam 11-yard pass from Josh Allen (Tyler Bass kick), 9:07. Bills 7–0. **Drive: 12 plays, 75 yards, 5:53.**
- TEN – Derrick Henry 2-yard run (Randy Bullock kick), 5:23. Tied 7–7. **Drive: 9 plays, 75 yards, 3:44.**

**Second quarter**

- BUF – Tyler Bass 49-yard field goal, 7:20. Bills 10–7. **Drive: 6 plays, 51 yards, 2:34.**
- BUF – Stefon Diggs 4-yard pass from Josh Allen (Tyler Bass kick), 1:00. Bills 17–7. **Drive: 8 plays, 77 yards, 4:10.**

**Third quarter**

- BUF – Stefon Diggs 46-yard pass from Josh Allen (Tyler Bass kick), 10:18. Bills 24–7. **Drive: 7 plays, 80 yards, 2:26.**
- BUF – Tyler Bass 37-yard field goal, 7:32. Bills 27–7. **Drive: 4 plays, 1 yard, 0:50.**
- BUF – Stefon Diggs 14-yard pass from Josh Allen (Tyler Bass kick), 5:34. Bills 34–7. **Drive: 4 plays, 5 yards, 1:13.**
- BUF – Matt Milano 43-yard interception return (Tyler Bass kick), 3:49. Bills 41–7.

**Fourth quarter**

- No scoring plays.

**Top passers**

- TEN – Ryan Tannehill – 11/20, 117 yards, 2 INT
- BUF – Josh Allen – 26/38, 317 yards, 4 TD

**Top rushers**

- TEN – Hassan Haskins – 9 rushes, 37 yards
- BUF – James Cook – 11 rushes, 53 yards

**Top receivers**

- TEN – Treylon Burks – 4 receptions, 47 yards
- BUF – Stefon Diggs – 12 receptions, 148 yards, 3 TD

Stefon Diggs had 3 touchdowns on Monday Night Football and the Bills thumped the defending #1 seed in the AFC Titans 41–7 after losing to them the last 2 seasons. The defense held the Titans to 187 yards of total offense and Matt Milano had an interception returned for a touchdown. Unfortunately, the Bills would lose Dane Jackson and Micah Hyde to neck injuries during the game, with Hyde later being ruled out for the season with a herniated disc.

==== Week 3: at Miami Dolphins ====
Week 3: Buffalo Bills at Miami Dolphins – Game summary

Quarter	1	2	3	4	Total
Bills	7	7	3	2	**19**
**Dolphins**	7	7	0	7	**21**

at Hard Rock Stadium, Miami Gardens, Florida

- Date: September 25
- Game time: 1:00 p.m. EDT
- Game weather: Partly sunny, 89 °F (32 °C)
- Game attendance: 66,206
- Referee: Alex Kemp
- TV announcers (CBS): Kevin Harlan, Trent Green and Melanie Collins
- Recap, Game Book

Game information

**First quarter**

- BUF – Devin Singletary 2-yard pass from Josh Allen (Tyler Bass kick), 9:03. Bills 7–0. **Drive: 10 plays, 75 yards, 5:57.**
- MIA – Chase Edmonds 1-yard run (Jason Sanders kick), 3:37. Tied 7–7. **Drive: 3 plays, 6 yards, 1:36.**

**Second quarter**

- BUF – Isaiah McKenzie 8-yard pass from Josh Allen (Tyler Bass kick), 11:59. Bills 14–7. **Drive: 14 plays, 75 yards, 6:38.**
- MIA – River Cracraft 11-yard pass from Tua Tagovailoa (Jason Sanders kick), 6:45. Tied 14–14. **Drive: 9 plays, 83 yards, 5:14.**

**Third quarter**

- BUF – Tyler Bass 30-yard field goal, 3:40. Bills 17–14. **Drive: 20 plays, 87 yards, 9:22.**

**Fourth quarter**

- MIA – Chase Edmonds 3-yard run (Jason Sanders kick), 10:05. Dolphins 21–17. **Drive: 7 plays, 72 yards, 4:04.**
- BUF – Thomas Morstead punt blocked out of bounds for a safety, 1:33. Dolphins 21–19. **Drive: 4 plays, -1 yards, 0:16.**

**Top passers**

- BUF – Josh Allen – 42/63, 400 yards, 2 TD
- MIA – Tua Tagovailoa – 13/18, 186 yards, TD

**Top rushers**

- BUF – Josh Allen – 8 rushes, 47 yards
- MIA – Chase Edmonds – 6 rushes, 21 yards, 2 TD

**Top receivers**

- BUF – Devin Singletary – 9 receptions, 78 yards, TD
- MIA – Jaylen Waddle – 4 receptions, 102 yards

The Bills sideline was in the sweltering sun while the home Dolphins were on the shaded side of Hard Rock Stadium, a major factor contributing to the Dolphins home field advantage. After trading touchdowns in the first half, the Bills had a 17–14 lead going into the fourth quarter, but Chase Edmonds scored his 2nd touchdown of the game to give the Dolphins a 21–17 lead. The Bills responded with an 8-minute drive, but on 4th and Goal from the 1-yard line, Josh Allen's pass fell incomplete and turned the ball over on downs. The Bills forced a Dolphins punt, but Thomas Morstead's kick hit Trent Sherfield in the buttocks and deflected backwards and out of the end zone for a safety to make the score 21–19. The play instantly became known as "The Butt Punt."

The Bills, only needing a field goal instead of a touchdown to win, got the ball back with no timeouts. With 18 seconds left, Allen avoided a sack and passed the ball to Isaiah McKenzie who tried to get out of bounds at the MIA-35 but was tackled just short of the sideline. The Bills hustled to get back to the line of scrimmage in time, but the clock hit all zeros and players on both teams collapsed in exhaustion. The Bills lost 21–19 in an instant classic, and fell to 2–1. The Dolphins became the only 3–0 team in the AFC.

==== Week 4: at Baltimore Ravens ====
Week 4: Buffalo Bills at Baltimore Ravens – Game summary

Quarter	1	2	3	4	Total
**Bills**	3	7	10	3	**23**
Ravens	14	6	0	0	**20**

at M&T Bank Stadium, Baltimore, Maryland

- Date: October 2
- Game time: 1:00 p.m. EDT
- Game weather: Cloudy, showers, 52 °F (11 °C)
- Game attendance: 70,494
- Referee: Jerome Boger
- TV announcers (CBS): Ian Eagle, Charles Davis and Evan Washburn
- Recap, Game Book

Game information

**First quarter**

- BAL – J. K. Dobbins 1-yard pass from Lamar Jackson (Justin Tucker kick), 13:26. Ravens 7–0. **Drive: 2 plays, 4 yards, 0:42.**
- BUF – Tyler Bass 38-yard field goal, 10:14. Ravens 7–3. **Drive: 8 plays, 37 yards, 2:12.**
- BAL – J. K. Dobbins 4-yard run (Justin Tucker kick), 1:06. Ravens 14–3. **Drive: 15 plays, 81 yards, 9:08.**

**Second quarter**

- BAL – Justin Tucker 42-yard field goal, 12:54. Ravens 17–3. **Drive: 5 plays, 12 yards, 2:26.**
- BAL – Justin Tucker 51-yard field goal, 3:39. Ravens 20–3. **Drive: 11 plays, 38 yards, 7:40.**
- BUF – Isaiah McKenzie 4-yard pass from Josh Allen (Tyler Bass kick), 0:09. Ravens 20–10. **Drive: 11 plays, 76 yards, 1:38.**

**Third quarter**

- BUF – Tyler Bass 39-yard field goal, 9:42. Ravens 20–13. **Drive: 10 plays, 51 yards, 4:07.**
- BUF – Josh Allen 11-yard run (Tyler Bass kick), 3:26. Tied 20–20. **Drive: 9 plays, 80 yards, 3:27.**

**Fourth quarter**

- BUF – Tyler Bass 21-yard field goal, 0:00. Bills 23–20. **Drive: 12 plays, 77 yards, 4:09.**

**Top passers**

- BUF – Josh Allen – 19/36, 213 yards, TD, INT
- BAL – Lamar Jackson – 20/29, 144 yards, TD, 2 INT

**Top rushers**

- BUF – Josh Allen – 11 rushes, 70 yards, TD
- BAL – Lamar Jackson – 11 rushes, 73 yards

**Top receivers**

- BUF – Stefon Diggs – 4 receptions, 62 yards
- BAL – Devin Duvernay – 4 receptions, 51 yards

Despite Baltimore climbing to a 20–3 lead at one point in the second quarter, with 10 of the Ravens' points coming off Bills turnovers, the Bills scored 20 unanswered points of their own and shut out Lamar Jackson and the Ravens offense in the second half. A key interception of Jackson by Bills safety Jordan Poyer in the fourth quarter set up Buffalo's game-winning field goal, as Ravens head coach John Harbaugh controversially opted to go for a touchdown on fourth and goal instead of attempting a go-ahead field goal. This was Buffalo's first win by one score since the 2020 season and their biggest comeback win since defeating the New England Patriots after being down 21–0 in week 3 of 2011.

==== Week 5: vs. Pittsburgh Steelers ====
Week 5: Pittsburgh Steelers at Buffalo Bills – Game summary

Quarter	1	2	3	4	Total
Steelers	3	0	0	0	**3**
**Bills**	10	21	0	7	**38**

at Highmark Stadium, Orchard Park, New York

- Date: October 9
- Game time: 1:00 p.m. EDT
- Game weather: Mostly cloudy, 55 °F (13 °C)
- Game attendance: 70,764
- Referee: John Hussey
- TV announcers (CBS): Jim Nantz, Tony Romo and Tracy Wolfson
- Recap, Game Book

Game information

**First quarter**

- BUF – Gabe Davis 98-yard pass from Josh Allen (Tyler Bass kick), 13:56. Bills 7–0. **Drive: 3 plays, 98 yards, 1:04.**
- PIT – Chris Boswell 29-yard field goal, 5:38. Bills 7–3. **Drive: 12 plays, 50 yards, 6:18.**
- BUF – Tyler Bass 35-yard field goal, 2:41. Bills 10–3. **Drive: 7 plays, 48 yards, 2:57.**

**Second quarter**

- BUF – Gabe Davis 62-yard pass from Josh Allen (Tyler Bass kick), 9:29. Bills 17–3. **Drive: 1 plays, 62 yards, 0:10.**
- BUF – Stefon Diggs 15-yard pass from Josh Allen (Tyler Bass kick), 7:20. Bills 24–3. **Drive: 2 plays, 53 yards, 0:33.**
- BUF – Khalil Shakir 24-yard pass from Josh Allen (Tyler Bass kick), 1:02. Bills 31–3. **Drive: 8 plays, 77 yards, 2:37.**

**Third quarter**

- No scoring plays.

**Fourth quarter**

- BUF – James Cook 24-yard run (Tyler Bass kick), 14:03. Bills 38–3. **Drive: 2 plays, 65 yards, 0:57.**

**Top passers**

- PIT – Kenny Pickett – 34/52, 327 yards, INT
- BUF – Josh Allen – 20/31, 424 yards, 4 TD, INT

**Top rushers**

- PIT – Jaylen Warren – 5 rushes, 24 yards
- BUF – Devin Singletary – 11 rushes, 73 yards

**Top receivers**

- PIT – George Pickens – 6 receptions, 83 yards
- BUF – Gabe Davis – 3 receptions, 171 yards, 2 TD

After a close win in Baltimore, the Bills came back home to play the Steelers, resulting in a 38–3 blowout victory. Josh Allen threw for a career-high 424 yards, also matching a career high of four passing touchdowns, in addition to matching the franchise record for the longest play from scrimmage when he threw a 98-yard touchdown pass to Gabe Davis on the third play of the game. Steelers rookie quarterback Kenny Pickett made his first career start during the game, taking the place of previous starter and former Bills backup quarterback Mitchell Trubisky. With the win, Buffalo improved to 4–1.

==== Week 6: at Kansas City Chiefs ====
Week 6: Buffalo Bills at Kansas City Chiefs – Game summary

Quarter	1	2	3	4	Total
**Bills**	0	10	7	7	**24**
Chiefs	0	10	7	3	**20**

at Arrowhead Stadium, Kansas City, Missouri

- Date: October 16
- Game time: 4:25 p.m. EDT/3:25 p.m. CDT
- Game weather: 62 °F (17 °C)
- Game attendance: 73,586
- Referee: Brad Allen
- TV announcers (CBS): Jim Nantz, Tony Romo and Tracy Wolfson
- Recap, Game Book

Game information

**First quarter**

- No scoring plays.

**Second quarter**

- BUF – Tyler Bass 39-yard field goal, 13:32. Bills 3–0. **Drive: 11 plays, 59 yards, 4:44.**
- KC – JuJu Smith-Schuster 42-yard pass from Patrick Mahomes (Harrison Butker kick), 11:31. Chiefs 7–3. **Drive: 6 plays, 79 yards, 2:01.**
- BUF – Gabe Davis 34-yard pass from Josh Allen (Tyler Bass kick), 0:16. Bills 10–7. **Drive: 7 plays, 96 yards, 1:13.**
- KC – Harrison Butker 62-yard field goal, 0:00. Tied 10–10. **Drive: 3 plays, 28 yards, 0:16.**

**Third quarter**

- BUF – Stefon Diggs 17-yard pass from Josh Allen (Tyler Bass kick), 7:02. Bills 17–10. **Drive: 6 plays, 59 yards, 3:13.**
- KC – Mecole Hardman 3-yard pass from Patrick Mahomes (Harrison Butker kick), 2:44. Tied 17–17. **Drive: 7 plays, 83 yards, 4:18.**

**Fourth quarter**

- KC – Harrison Butker 44-yard field goal, 9:49. Chiefs 20–17. **Drive: 8 plays, 28 yards, 4:23.**
- BUF – Dawson Knox 14-yard pass from Josh Allen (Tyler Bass kick), 1:04. Bills 24–20. **Drive: 12 plays, 76 yards, 4:27.**

**Top passers**

- BUF – Josh Allen – 27/40, 329 yards, 3 TD
- KC – Patrick Mahomes – 25/40, 338 yards, 2 TD, 2 INT

**Top rushers**

- BUF – Devin Singletary – 17 rushes, 85 yards
- KC – Clyde Edwards-Helaire – 9 rushes, 33 yards

**Top receivers**

- BUF – Stefon Diggs – 10 receptions, 148 yards, TD
- KC – JuJu Smith-Schuster – 5 receptions, 113 yards, TD

In a rematch of the previous season's AFC Divisional playoff game against Kansas City, which saw Buffalo lose in overtime after allowing the Chiefs to tie the game with just 13 seconds left in regulation, the Bills and Chiefs competed toe-to-toe on both offense and defense until the fourth quarter. After Buffalo's defense limited the Chiefs to a field goal in the quarter and forced a three-and-out on the Chiefs' penultimate drive, Josh Allen marched the Bills down the field, throwing a game-winning touchdown pass to Dawson Knox with 1:04 left in regulation. Chiefs quarterback Patrick Mahomes was intercepted by Bills cornerback Taron Johnson two plays later, preventing another last-minute scoring drive by Kansas City in addition to allowing Buffalo to avenge its playoff loss. The Bills improved to 5–1 with the win, attaining the best record in the AFC heading into their bye week.

==== Week 8: vs. Green Bay Packers ====
Week 8: Green Bay Packers at Buffalo Bills – Game summary

Quarter	1	2	3	4	Total
Packers	0	7	3	7	**17**
**Bills**	7	17	3	0	**27**

at Highmark Stadium, Orchard Park, New York

- Date: October 30
- Game time: 8:20 p.m. EDT
- Game weather: Partly cloudy, 50 °F (10 °C)
- Game attendance: 70,863
- Referee: Ronald Torbert
- TV announcers (NBC): Mike Tirico, Cris Collinsworth and Melissa Stark
- Recap, Game Book

Game information

**First quarter**

- BUF – Dawson Knox 1-yard pass from Josh Allen (Tyler Bass kick), 3:34. Bills 7–0. **Drive: 8 plays, 61 yards, 5:13.**

**Second quarter**

- BUF – Stefon Diggs 26-yard pass from Josh Allen (Tyler Bass kick), 14:53. Bills 14–0. **Drive: 4 plays, 51 yards, 1:48.**
- GB – Romeo Doubs 19-yard pass from Aaron Rodgers (Mason Crosby kick), 6:15. Bills 14–7. **Drive: 12 plays, 80 yards, 8:38.**
- BUF – Isaiah McKenzie 7-yard run (Tyler Bass kick), 1:54. Bills 21–7. **Drive: 8 plays, 80 yards, 4:21.**
- BUF – Tyler Bass 42-yard field goal, 00:00. Bills 24–7. **Drive: 4 plays, 56 yards, 0:53.**

**Third quarter**

- GB – Mason Crosby 38-yard field goal, 10:20. Bills 24–10. **Drive: 8 plays, 72 yards, 4:40.**
- BUF – Tyler Bass 38-yard field goal, 5:59. Bills 27–10. **Drive: 8 plays, 51 yards, 4:21.**

**Fourth quarter**

- GB – Samori Toure 37-yard pass from Aaron Rodgers (Mason Crosby kick), 6:32. Bills 27–17. **Drive: 8 plays, 95 yards, 3:33.**

**Top passers**

- GB – Aaron Rodgers – 19/30, 203 yards, 2 TD, 1 INT
- BUF – Josh Allen – 13/25, 218 yards, 2 TD, 2 INT

**Top rushers**

- GB – Aaron Jones – 20 rushes, 143 yards
- BUF – Devin Singletary – 14 rushes, 67 yards

**Top receivers**

- GB – Romeo Doubs – 4 receptions, 62 yards, TD
- BUF – Stefon Diggs – 6 receptions, 108 yards, TD

==== Week 9: at New York Jets ====
Week 9: Buffalo Bills at New York Jets – Game summary

Quarter	1	2	3	4	Total
Bills	7	7	0	3	**17**
**Jets**	3	7	7	3	**20**

at MetLife Stadium, East Rutherford, New Jersey

- Date: November 6
- Game time: 1:00 p.m. EST
- Game weather: Warm and overcast, 76 °F (24 °C)
- Game attendance: 83,135
- Referee: Land Clark
- TV announcers (CBS): Ian Eagle, Charles Davis and Evan Washburn
- Recap, Game Book

Game information

**First quarter**

- BUF – Josh Allen 1-yard run (Tyler Bass kick), 4:39. Bills 7–0. **Drive: 14 plays, 67 yards, 7:42.**
- NYJ – Greg Zuerlein 53-yard field goal, 0:31. Bills 7–3. **Drive: 7 plays, 49 yards, 4:08.**

**Second quarter**

- BUF – Josh Allen 36-yard run (Tyler Bass kick), 6:30. Bills 14–3. **Drive: 9 plays, 93 yards, 4:12.**
- NYJ – Michael Carter 6-yard run (Greg Zuerlein kick), 0:32. Bills 14–10. **Drive: 13 plays, 75 yards, 5:58.**

**Third quarter**

- NYJ – James Robinson 7-yard pass from Zach Wilson (Greg Zuerlein kick), 4:03. Jets 17–14. **Drive: 4 plays, 19 yards, 1:27.**

**Fourth quarter**

- BUF – Tyler Bass 51-yard field goal, 13:33. Tied 17–17. **Drive: 12 plays, 42 yards, 5:30.**
- NYJ – Greg Zuerlein 28-yard field goal, 1:43. Jets 20–17. **Drive: 13 plays, 86 yards, 6:10.**

**Top passers**

- BUF – Josh Allen – 18/34, 205 yards, 2 INT
- NYJ – Zach Wilson – 18/25, 154 yards, TD

**Top rushers**

- BUF – Josh Allen – 9 rushes, 86 yards, 2 TD
- NYJ – Michael Carter – 12 rushes, 76 yards, TD

**Top receivers**

- BUF – Stefon Diggs – 5 receptions, 93 yards
- NYJ – Garrett Wilson – 8 receptions, 92 yards

The Bills squandered a 14–3 first-half lead and lost to Zach Wilson and the rival Jets 20–17, thanks to a strong performance from the Jets' defense and run game (despite missing starting running back Breece Hall due to a season-ending injury), in addition to a fourth-quarter field goal by Greg Zuerlein set up by a 6-minute drive that started at New York's four-yard line. In addition, Allen, who scored two rushing touchdowns but also threw two interceptions during the game, suffered an elbow injury on Buffalo's final drive, which ended with a turnover on downs and allowed the Jets to run out the clock. With the upset loss, the Bills fell to 6–2.

==== Week 10: vs. Minnesota Vikings ====
Week 10: Minnesota Vikings at Buffalo Bills – Game summary

Quarter	1	2	3	4	OT	Total
**Vikings**	7	3	7	13	3	**33**
Bills	14	10	3	3	0	**30**

at Highmark Stadium, Orchard Park, New York

- Date: November 13
- Game time: 1:00 p.m. EST
- Game weather: Cloudy, 38 °F (3 °C)
- Game attendance: 70,844
- Referee: Craig Wrolstad
- TV announcers (Fox): Joe Davis, Daryl Johnston and Pam Oliver
- Recap, Game Book

Game information

**First quarter**

- MIN – Justin Jefferson 22-yard pass from Kirk Cousins (Greg Joseph kick), 10:13. Vikings 7–0. **Drive: 6 plays, 74 yards, 2:54.**
- BUF – Devin Singletary 5-yard run (Tyler Bass kick), 8:10. Tied 7–7. **Drive: 4 plays, 47 yards, 2:03.**
- BUF – Devin Singletary 1-yard run (Tyler Bass kick), 1:04. Bills 14–7. **Drive: 10 plays, 70 yards, 5:09.**

**Second quarter**

- BUF – Tyler Bass 34-yard field goal, 12:53. Bills 17–7. **Drive: 7 plays, 12 yards, 2:25.**
- MIN – Greg Joseph 27-yard field goal, 7:12. Bills 17–10. **Drive: 12 plays, 46 yards, 5:41.**
- BUF – Gabe Davis 11-yard pass from Josh Allen (Tyler Bass kick), 0:28. Bills 24–10. **Drive: 5 plays, 71 yards, 1:22.**

**Third quarter**

- BUF – Tyler Bass 45-yard field goal, 1:51. Bills 27–10. **Drive: 8 plays, 46 yards, 4:21.**
- MIN – Dalvin Cook 81-yard run (Greg Joseph kick), 1:34. Bills 27–17. **Drive: 1 play, 81 yards, 0:17.**

**Fourth quarter**

- MIN – C. J. Ham 3-yard run (kick failed, hit right upright), 4:34. Bills 27–23. **Drive: 13 plays, 66 yards, 5:53.**
- MIN – Eric Kendricks fumble recovery in the end zone (Greg Joseph kick), 0:41. Vikings 30–27.
- BUF – Tyler Bass 29-yard field goal, 0:02. Tied 30–30. **Drive: 5 plays, 69 yards, 0:39.**

**Overtime**

- MIN – Greg Joseph 33-yard field goal, 3:42. Vikings 33–30. **Drive: 12 plays, 60 yards, 6:18.**

**Top passers**

- MIN – Kirk Cousins – 30/50, 357 yards, TD, 2 INT
- BUF – Josh Allen – 29/43, 330 yards, TD, 2 INT

**Top rushers**

- MIN – Dalvin Cook – 14 rushes, 119 yards, TD
- BUF – Josh Allen – 6 rushes, 84 yards

**Top receivers**

- MIN – Justin Jefferson – 10 receptions, 193 yards, TD
- BUF – Stefon Diggs – 12 receptions, 128 yards

The Bills blew their second consecutive double-digit lead, squandering a 27–10 third quarter lead. After the Bills stopped a long Vikings drive that stalled within Buffalo's one-yard line, a botched snap on Buffalo's ensuing play resulted in a fumble recovered by Vikings linebacker Eric Kendricks for a touchdown that put Minnesota up 30–27. The Bills would score a field goal that tied the score at 30 apiece and led to overtime.

After the Vikings scored first on a 33-yard field goal by Greg Joseph, Allen marched the Bills downfield, but threw a game-ending interception to Patrick Peterson from Minnesota's 20-yard line, his second of the game and sixth in three games. With a 33–30 overtime loss, their second consecutive upset loss, the Bills fell to 6–3 and third place in the division.

This was Stefon Diggs' first game against his former team after he was traded from Minnesota to Buffalo before the 2020 season. Diggs and Vikings receiver Justin Jefferson, who was drafted with the first-round pick Buffalo sent for Diggs, both had strong performances in the game, as they both surpassed 100 yards receiving and made remarkable one-handed catches during the course of what was later called the "game of the year" by several analysts.

==== Week 11: vs. Cleveland Browns ====
Week 11: Cleveland Browns at Buffalo Bills – Game summary

Quarter	1	2	3	4	Total
Browns	7	3	0	13	**23**
**Bills**	3	10	9	9	**31**

at Ford Field, Detroit, Michigan

- Date: November 20
- Game time: 1:00 p.m. EST
- Game weather: None (indoor stadium)
- Game attendance: 52,146
- Referee: Adrian Hill
- TV announcers (CBS): Andrew Catalon, James Lofton and Amanda Renner
- Recap, Game Book

Game information

**First quarter**

- CLE – Amari Cooper 25-yard pass from Jacoby Brissett (Cade York kick), 9:02. Browns 7–0. **Drive: 9 plays, 75 yards, 5:58.**
- BUF – Tyler Bass 42-yard field goal, 3:32. Browns 7–3. **Drive: 4 plays, 8 yards, 1:44.**

**Second quarter**

- CLE – Cade York 32-yard field goal, 14:05. Browns 10–3. **Drive: 9 plays, 51 yards, 4:27.**
- BUF – Tyler Bass 36-yard field goal, 4:54. Browns 10–6. **Drive: 11 plays, 34 yards, 3:23.**
- BUF – Stefon Diggs 5-yard pass from Josh Allen (Tyler Bass kick), 0:14. Bills 13–10. **Drive: 11 plays, 78 yards, 1:40.**

**Third quarter**

- BUF – Tyler Bass 56-yard field goal, 9:42. Bills 16–10. **Drive: 8 plays, 36 yards, 5:18.**
- BUF – Devin Singletary 5-yard run (run failed), 4:08. Bills 22–10. **Drive: 4 play, 73 yards, 1:41.**

**Fourth quarter**

- BUF – Tyler Bass 49-yard field goal, 13:20. Bills 25–10. **Drive: 7 plays, 45 yards, 3:17.**
- BUF – Tyler Bass 28-yard field goal, 6:45. Bills 28–10. **Drive: 9 plays, 54 yards, 5:08.**
- CLE – Amari Cooper 7-yard pass from Jacoby Brissett (pass failed), 4:11. Bills 28–16. **Drive: 9 plays, 75 yards, 2:34.**
- BUF – Tyler Bass 39-yard field goal, 1:56. Bills 31–16. **Drive: 7 plays, 21 yards, 2:15.**
- CLE – Donovan Peoples-Jones 2-yard pass from Jacoby Brissett (Cade York kick), 0:19. Bills 31–23. **Drive: 8 plays, 75 yards, 1:37.**

**Top passers**

- CLE– Jacoby Brissett – 28/41, 324 yards, 3 TD
- BUF – Josh Allen – 18/27, 197 yards, TD

**Top rushers**

- CLE – Kareem Hunt – 5 rushes, 32 yards
- BUF – Devin Singletary – 18 rushes, 86 yards, TD

**Top receivers**

- CLE – Amari Cooper – 8 receptions, 113 yards, 2 TD
- BUF – Dawson Knox – 7 receptions, 70 yards

Due to a severe lake effect snowstorm in Buffalo, this game was moved to Ford Field in Detroit in a similar fashion to the Bills' 2014 home game against the New York Jets, which was moved due to the "Snowvember" storm that dumped 7 feet of snow on Highmark Stadium. This was the Bills' second home game in franchise history moved to Detroit. Since Buffalo was scheduled to go to Detroit for the following week's game anyway, this relocation worked in their favor.

==== Week 12: at Detroit Lions ====
Thanksgiving Day games

Week 12: Buffalo Bills at Detroit Lions – Game summary

Quarter	1	2	3	4	Total
**Bills**	7	10	2	9	**28**
Lions	7	7	0	11	**25**

at Ford Field, Detroit, Michigan

- Date: November 24
- Game time: 12:30 p.m. EST
- Game weather: None (indoor stadium)
- Game attendance: 66,553
- Referee: Clete Blakeman
- TV announcers (CBS): Jim Nantz, Tony Romo and Tracy Wolfson
- Recap, Game Book

Game information

**First quarter**

- DET – Jamaal Williams 2-yard run (Michael Badgley kick), 6:44. Lions 7–0. **Drive: 12 plays, 61 yards, 6:17.**
- BUF – Isaiah McKenzie 19-yard pass from Josh Allen (Tyler Bass kick), 1:58. Tied 7–7. **Drive: 10 plays, 75 yards, 4:46.**

**Second quarter**

- BUF – Josh Allen 3-yard run (Tyler Bass kick), 7:55. Bills 14–7. **Drive: 10 plays, 58 yards, 5:28.**
- DET – Amon-Ra St. Brown 1-yard pass from Jared Goff (Michael Badgley kick), 1:52. Tied 14–14. **Drive: 15 plays, 76 yards, 6:03.**
- BUF – Tyler Bass 47-yard field goal, 0:00. Bills 17–14. **Drive: 10 plays, 47 yards, 1:52.**

**Third quarter**

- BUF – Jared Goff sacked in end zone by Ed Oliver for a safety, 9:05. Bills 19–14.

**Fourth quarter**

- DET – D. J. Chark 1-yard pass from Jared Goff (D'Andre Swift run), 13:47. Lions 22–19. **Drive: 5 plays, 35 yards, 2:09.**
- BUF – Stefon Diggs 5-yard pass from Josh Allen (kick failed), 2:40. Bills 25–22. **Drive: 14 plays, 90 yards, 6:19.**
- DET – Michael Badgley 51-yard field goal, 0:23. Tied 25–25. **Drive: 10 plays, 42 yards, 2:17.**
- BUF – Tyler Bass 45-yard field goal, 0:02. Bills 28–25. **Drive: 4 plays, 48 yards, 0:21.**

**Top passers**

- BUF – Josh Allen – 24/42, 253 yards, 2 TD, INT
- DET – Jared Goff – 23/37, 240 yards, 2 TD

**Top rushers**

- BUF – Josh Allen – 10 rushes, 78 yards, TD
- DET – Jamaal Williams – 18 rushes, 66 yards, TD

**Top receivers**

- BUF – Stefon Diggs – 8 receptions, 77 yards, TD
- DET – Amon-Ra St. Brown – 9 receptions, 122 yards, TD

In Buffalo's third Thanksgiving Day game in four years, Detroit, winner of three straight after a 1–6 start, kept pace with the Bills in a back-and-forth affair and took the lead in the fourth quarter. Josh Allen led a go-ahead touchdown drive to retake the lead, although kicker Tyler Bass missed the extra point, his first such miss since the 2020 season. Despite the Lions tying the game with a field goal with 23 seconds left on the clock, Allen put the Bills into field goal range on the next drive with a 36-yard pass to Stefon Diggs, who was double-covered, and Bass made the game-winning 45–yard kick, allowing Buffalo to win 28–25 and improve to 8–3.

==== Week 13: at New England Patriots ====
Week 13: Buffalo Bills at New England Patriots – Game summary

Quarter	1	2	3	4	Total
**Bills**	3	14	0	7	**24**
Patriots	7	0	0	3	**10**

at Gillette Stadium, Foxborough, Massachusetts

- Date: December 1
- Game time: 8:15 p.m. EST
- Game weather: Clear, 35 °F (2 °C)
- Game attendance: 65,878
- Referee: Shawn Hochuli
- TV announcers (WKBW/Prime Video): Al Michaels, Kirk Herbstreit and Kaylee Hartung
- Recap, Game Book

Game information

**First quarter**

- BUF – Tyler Bass 48-yard field goal, 8:02. Bills 3–0. **Drive: 9 plays, 37 yards, 4:55.**
- NE – Marcus Jones 48-yard pass from Mac Jones (Nick Folk kick), 4:46. Patriots 7–3. **Drive: 5 plays, 75 yards, 3:16.**

**Second quarter**

- BUF – Stefon Diggs 8-yard pass from Josh Allen (Tyler Bass kick), 14:56. Bills 10–7. **Drive: 9 plays, 82 yards, 4:50.**
- BUF – Gabe Davis 8-yard pass from Josh Allen (Tyler Bass kick), 5:27. Bills 17–7. **Drive: 14 plays, 56 yards, 7:46.**

**Third quarter**

- No scoring plays.

**Fourth quarter**

- BUF – Devin Singletary 1-yard run (Tyler Bass kick), 14:31. Bills 24–7. **Drive: 15 plays, 94 yards, 8:55.**
- NE – Nick Folk 39-yard field goal, 1:53. Bills 24–10. **Drive: 17 plays, 57 yards, 5:45.**

**Top passers**

- BUF – Josh Allen – 22/33, 223 yards, 2 TD
- NE – Mac Jones – 22/36, 195 yards, TD

**Top rushers**

- BUF – James Cook – 14 rushes, 64 yards
- NE – Rhamondre Stevenson – 10 rushes, 54 yards

**Top receivers**

- BUF – Stefon Diggs – 7 receptions, 92 yards, TD
- NE – Marcus Jones – 2 receptions, 51 yards, TD

Aside from a 48-yard catch-and-run touchdown pass in the first quarter from Patriots quarterback Mac Jones to Marcus Jones, who normally plays cornerback, the Bills kept New England's offense in check, forcing numerous punts, and dominated the game with a balanced offense between the passing and rushing attacks, resulting in a 24–10 win in favor of Buffalo. With the team's first division win of the season and fifth win in six games over the Patriots, Buffalo improved to 9–3.

==== Week 14: vs. New York Jets ====
Week 14: New York Jets at Buffalo Bills – Game summary

Quarter	1	2	3	4	Total
Jets	0	0	7	5	**12**
**Bills**	0	7	10	3	**20**

at Highmark Stadium, Orchard Park, New York

- Date: December 11
- Game time: 1:00 p.m. EST
- Game weather: Rain showers, 37 °F (3 °C)
- Game attendance: 70,603
- Referee: Alex Kemp
- TV announcers (CBS): Jim Nantz, Tony Romo and Tracy Wolfson
- Recap, Game Book

Game information

**First quarter**

- No scoring plays.

**Second quarter**

- BUF – Dawson Knox 24-yard pass from Josh Allen (Tyler Bass kick), 0:26. Bills 7–0. **Drive: 7 plays, 70 yards, 2:38.**

**Third quarter**

- NYJ – Zonovan Knight 13-yard run (Greg Zuerlein kick), 9:59. Tied 7–7. **Drive: 10 plays, 72 yards, 5:01.**
- BUF – Josh Allen 5-yard run (Tyler Bass kick), 7:20. Bills 14–7. **Drive: 6 plays, 75 yards, 2:39.**
- BUF – Tyler Bass 38-yard field goal, 2:07. Bills 17–7. **Drive: 5 plays, 24 yards, 2:23.**

**Fourth quarter**

- BUF – Tyler Bass 49-yard field goal, 12:23. Bills 20–7. **Drive: 5 plays, 21 yards, 2:37.**
- NYJ – Punt blocked by Jermaine Johnson II out of bounds in end zone for a safety, 7:30. Bills 20–9.
- NYJ – Greg Zuerlein 26-yard field goal, 1:18. Bills 20–12. **Drive: 9 plays, 55 yards, 1:55.**

**Top passers**

- NYJ – Mike White – 27/44, 268 yards
- BUF – Josh Allen – 16/27, 147 yards, TD

**Top rushers**

- NYJ – Zonovan Knight – 17 rushes, 71 yards, TD
- BUF – Josh Allen – 10 rushes, 47 yards, TD

**Top receivers**

- NYJ – Garrett Wilson – 6 receptions, 78 yards
- BUF – Dawson Knox – 4 receptions, 41 yards, TD

==== Week 15: vs. Miami Dolphins ====
Week 15: Miami Dolphins at Buffalo Bills – Game summary

Quarter	1	2	3	4	Total
Dolphins	3	10	13	3	**29**
**Bills**	7	14	0	11	**32**

at Highmark Stadium, Orchard Park, New York

- Date: December 17
- Game time: 8:15 p.m. EST
- Game weather: Cloudy, 30 °F (−1 °C)
- Game attendance: 70,794
- Referee: Bill Vinovich
- TV announcers (NFLN): Kevin Kugler, Mark Sanchez, Laura Okmin and Peter Schrager
- Recap, Game Book

Game information

**First quarter**

- MIA – Jason Sanders 39-yard field goal, 2:59. Dolphins 3–0. **Drive: 14 plays, 52 yards, 7:45.**
- BUF – Quintin Morris 14-yard pass from Josh Allen (Tyler Bass kick), 1:05. Bills 7–3. **Drive: 4 plays, 75 yards, 1:54.**

**Second quarter**

- MIA – Jason Sanders 21-yard field goal, 14:47. Bills 7–6. **Drive: 5 plays, 72 yards, 1:18.**
- BUF – Nyheim Hines 10-yard pass from Josh Allen (Tyler Bass kick), 8:18. Bills 14–6. **Drive: 12 plays, 75 yards, 6:29.**
- MIA – Salvon Ahmed 11-yard run (Jason Sanders kick), 2:59. Bills 14–13. **Drive: 10 plays, 75 yards, 5:19.**
- BUF – James Cook 4-yard pass from Josh Allen (Tyler Bass kick), 0:00. Bills 21–13. **Drive: 12 plays, 82 yards, 2:59.**

**Third quarter**

- MIA – Jaylen Waddle 67-yard pass from Tua Tagovailoa (pass failed), 12:48. Bills 21–19. **Drive: 3 plays, 73 yards, 0:51.**
- MIA – Tyreek Hill 20-yard pass from Tua Tagovailoa (Jason Sanders kick), 2:30. Dolphins 26–21. **Drive: 6 plays, 50 yards, 2:59.**

**Fourth quarter**

- MIA – Jason Sanders 47-yard field goal, 11:56. Dolphins 29–21. **Drive: 5 plays, 18 yards, 2:43.**
- BUF – Dawson Knox 5-yard pass from Josh Allen (Josh Allen run), 9:02. Tied 29–29. **Drive: 7 plays, 75 yards, 2:54.**
- BUF – Tyler Bass 25-yard field goal, 0:00. Bills 32–29. **Drive: 15 plays, 86 yards, 5:56.**

**Top passers**

- MIA – Tua Tagovailoa – 17/30, 234 yards, 2 TD
- BUF – Josh Allen – 25/40, 304 yards, 4 TD

**Top rushers**

- MIA – Raheem Mostert – 17 rushes, 136 yards
- BUF – Josh Allen – 10 rushes, 77 yards

**Top receivers**

- MIA – Jaylen Waddle – 3 receptions, 114 yards, TD
- BUF – Dawson Knox – 6 receptions, 98 yards, TD

Buffalo hosted the Dolphins in a rematch of week 3's game, with weather conditions featuring lake-effect snow in contrast to the hot, humid conditions in Miami earlier that year. Early in the game, fans threw snowballs onto the field before head official Bill Vinovich warned that the Bills would be assessed a 15-yard unsportsmanlike conduct penalty if any snowballs hit Dolphins players despite no rule existing on that matter.

The Dolphins took the early 3–0 lead, but the Bills responded with a quick drive to take the lead with a touchdown pass to Quintin Morris from Josh Allen. After Buffalo took a 21–13 halftime lead, Miami stormed back with two quick passing touchdowns from Tua Tagovailoa to Jaylen Waddle and Tyreek Hill, respectively, to retake the lead, then forced a fumble on Allen to set up a field goal to make the score 29–21 in its favor. Allen and the Bills offense would nonetheless adjust to Miami's heavy blitz, setting up a Dawson Knox touchdown reception with several quarterback runs to avoid pressure, with Allen barely crossing the plane on Buffalo's ensuing two-point conversion attempt to tie the game at 29. After a stalled drive by Dolphins, Buffalo received the ball back with under six minutes left, but drove down the field from its own 14-yard-line to the Miami 7-yard-line, setting up Tyler Bass's game-winning field goal. With the 32–29 win, their 10th in their last 12 games against the Dolphins, the Bills improved to 11–3 and clinched their fourth-straight playoff berth.

==== Week 16: at Chicago Bears ====
Week 16: Buffalo Bills at Chicago Bears – Game summary

Quarter	1	2	3	4	Total
**Bills**	6	0	15	14	**35**
Bears	7	3	0	3	**13**

at Soldier Field, Chicago, Illinois

- Date: December 24
- Game time: 1:00 p.m. EST/12:00 p.m. CST
- Game weather: Mostly sunny, 9 °F (−13 °C)
- Game attendance: 59,929
- Referee: Carl Cheffers
- TV announcers (CBS): Greg Gumbel, Adam Archuleta and AJ Ross
- Recap, Game Book

Game information

**First quarter**

- CHI – Dante Pettis 6-yard pass from Justin Fields (Cairo Santos kick), 9:41. Bears 7–0. **Drive: 8 plays, 64 yards, 5:19.**
- BUF – Gabe Davis 19-yard pass from Josh Allen (kick failed), 6:22. Bears 7–6. **Drive: 6 plays, 71 yards, 3:19.**

**Second quarter**

- CHI – Cairo Santos 37-yard field goal, 3:21. Bears 10–6. **Drive: 8 plays, 19 yards, 4:32.**

**Third quarter**

- BUF – Devin Singletary 33-yard run (Josh Allen–Khalil Shakir pass), 10:51. Bills 14–10. **Drive: 8 plays, 86 yards, 4:09.**
- BUF – James Cook 27-yard run (Tyler Bass kick), 7:57. Bills 21–10. **Drive: 3 plays, 35 yards, 0:47.**

**Fourth quarter**

- CHI – Cairo Santos 35-yard field goal, 10:19. Bills 21–13. **Drive: 4 plays, 1 yard, 1:54.**
- BUF – Josh Allen 4-yard run (Tyler Bass kick), 3:45. Bills 28–13. **Drive: 8 plays, 56 yards, 3:36.**
- BUF – Dawson Knox 13-yard pass from Josh Allen (Tyler Bass kick), 1:02. Bills 35–13. **Drive: 4 plays, 20 yards, 1:06.**

**Top passers**

- BUF – Josh Allen – 15/26, 172 yards, 2 TD, 2 INT
- CHI – Justin Fields – 15/23, 119 yards, TD

**Top rushers**

- BUF – Devin Singletary – 12 rushes, 106 yards, TD
- CHI – David Montgomery – 16 rushes, 62 yards

**Top receivers**

- BUF – Gabe Davis – 3 receptions, 45 yards, TD
- CHI – Velus Jones Jr. – 2 receptions, 52 yards

In frigid conditions, Buffalo trailed Chicago 10–6 at halftime, partly due to Tyler Bass missing an extra point and a field goal in addition to a redzone interception by Josh Allen, but stormed back in the second half thanks to strong performances by running backs Devin Singletary and James Cook, outscoring the Bears 29–3 the rest of the way and holding dual-threat quarterback Justin Fields to just six yards rushing in the game. With the dominant win, the Bills improved to 12–3 and clinched their third straight AFC East division title.

==== Week 17: at Cincinnati Bengals ====
Week 17: Buffalo Bills at Cincinnati Bengals – Game summary

Quarter	1	2	3	4	Total
Bills	3	-	-	-	**3**
Bengals	7	-	-	-	**7**

at Paycor Stadium, Cincinnati, Ohio

- Date: January 2
- Game time: 8:30 p.m. EST
- Referee: Shawn Smith
- TV announcers (ESPN/ABC): Joe Buck, Troy Aikman and Lisa Salters
- Preview

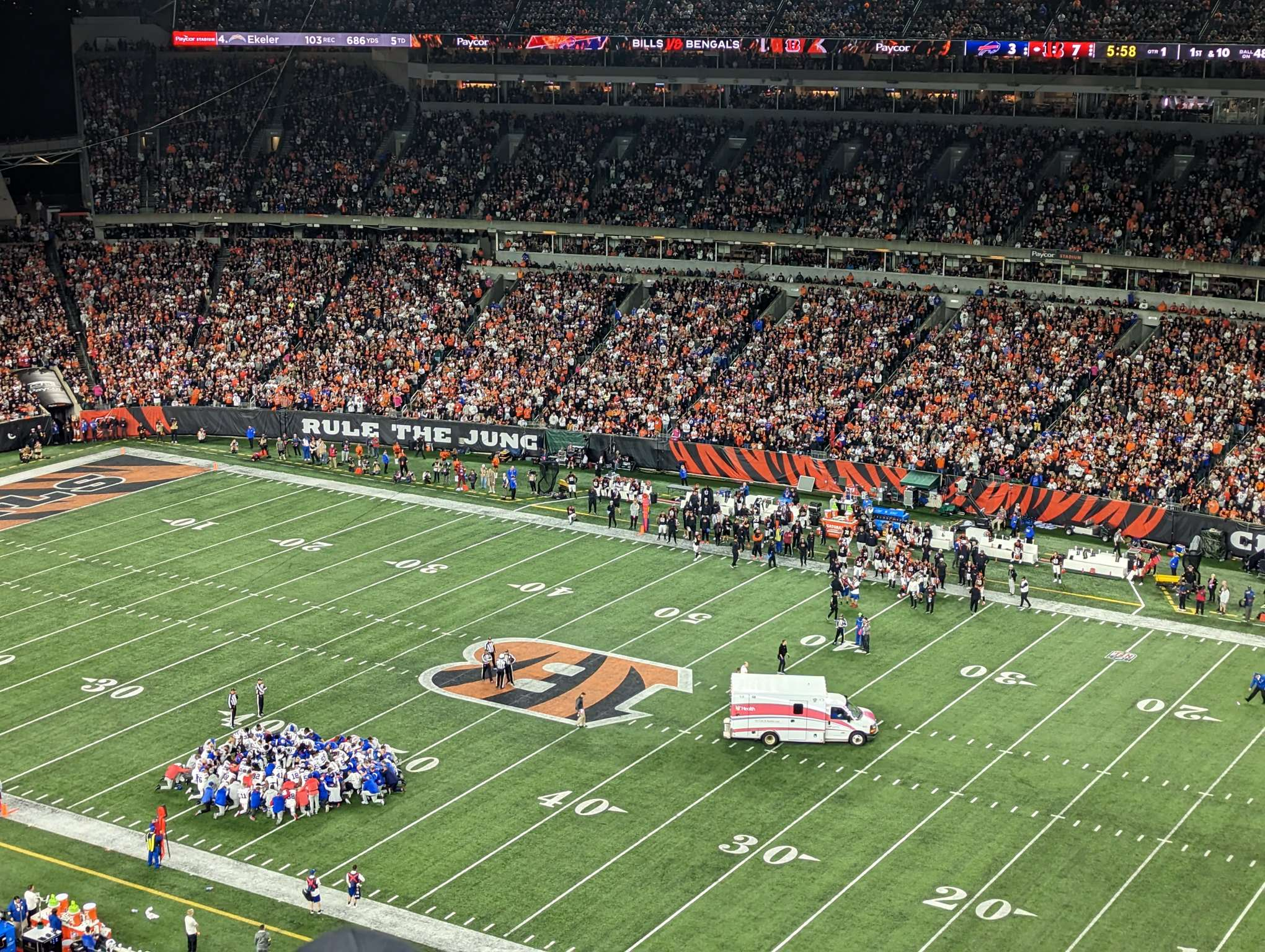
Bills players kneel (bottom left) as an ambulance takes Damar Hamlin off the field.

The game was postponed with 5:58 remaining in the 1st quarter due to an injury to Damar Hamlin, who was sent to the hospital in critical condition after collapsing on the field. The NFL released a statement that said that the game will not be resumed during the week, as well the team's week 18 game will be played as it is scheduled. The game was ultimately declared no contest, and it was officially canceled on January 5. It was the only time in NFL history that a regular season game has been canceled after starting and was never made up. Due to the cancellation, the Bills stayed at 12–3.

==== Week 18: vs. New England Patriots ====
Week 18: New England Patriots at Buffalo Bills – Game summary

Quarter	1	2	3	4	Total
Patriots	7	7	3	6	**23**
**Bills**	7	7	14	7	**35**

at Highmark Stadium, Orchard Park, New York

- Date: January 8
- Game time: 1:00 p.m. EST
- Game weather: Cloudy, 31 °F (−1 °C)
- Game attendance: 70,753
- Referee: Clay Martin
- TV announcers (CBS): Jim Nantz, Tony Romo and Tracy Wolfson
- Recap, Game Book

Game information

**First quarter**

- BUF – Nyheim Hines 96-yard kickoff return (Tyler Bass kick), 14:46. Bills 7–0. **Drive: 0 plays, 0 yards, 0:14.**
- NE – Jakobi Meyers 2-yard pass from Mac Jones (Nick Folk kick), 5:45. Tied 7–7. **Drive: 9 plays, 74 yards, 4:44.**

**Second quarter**

- BUF – Dawson Knox 4-yard pass from Josh Allen (Tyler Bass kick), 14:15. Bills 14–7. **Drive: 13 plays, 75 yards, 6:30.**
- NE – DeVante Parker 2-yard pass from Mac Jones (Nick Folk kick), 3:45. Tied 14–14. **Drive: 9 plays, 74 yards, 5:31.**

**Third quarter**

- NE – Nick Folk 24-yard field goal, 7:06. Patriots 17–14. **Drive: 4 plays, 5 yards, 1:28.**
- BUF – Nyheim Hines 101-yard kickoff return (Tyler Bass kick), 6:53. Bills 21–17. **Drive: 0 plays, 0 yards, 0:13.**
- BUF – John Brown 42-yard pass from Josh Allen (Tyler Bass kick), 1:35. Bills 28–17. **Drive: 7 plays, 81 yards, 3:02.**

**Fourth quarter**

- NE – DeVante Parker 26-yard pass from Mac Jones (pass failed), 11:37. Bills 28–23. **Drive: 8 plays, 85 yards, 4:58.**
- BUF – Stefon Diggs 49-yard pass from Josh Allen (Tyler Bass kick), 8:51. Bills 35–23. **Drive: 4 plays, 60 yards, 2:46.**

**Top passers**

- NE – Mac Jones – 26/40, 243 yards, 3 TD, 3 INT
- BUF – Josh Allen – 19/31, 254 yards, 3 TD, INT

**Top rushers**

- NE – Rhamondre Stevenson – 6 rushes, 54 yards
- BUF – James Cook – 9 rushes, 45 yards

**Top receivers**

- NE – DeVante Parker – 6 receptions, 79 yards, 2 TD
- BUF – Stefon Diggs – 7 receptions, 104 yards, TD

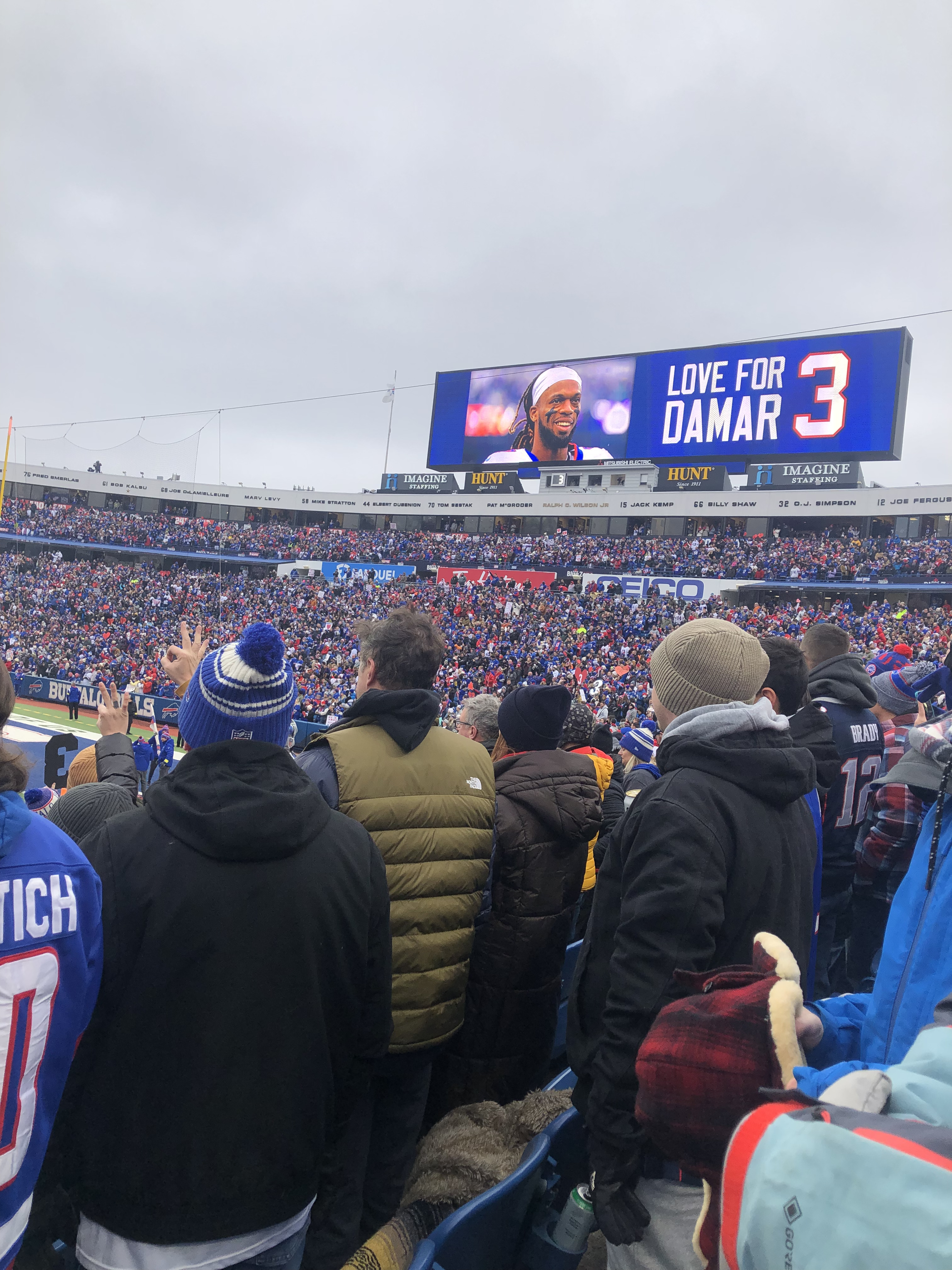
Bills showing support for Hamlin at home against the Patriots, one week after his collapse

Playing one week after Hamlin's collapse and hospitalization, Buffalo dedicated this game to him as part of league-wide tributes to Hamlin, who was continuing to recover in the ICU. Despite three passing touchdowns by Mac Jones, the Bills countered with two kick return touchdowns by Nyheim Hines and three passing scores from Allen, in addition to intercepting Jones three times. The Bills matched a franchise record by notching their 13th win of the season, clinching the #2 seed in the AFC and ensuring that a hypothetical AFC Championship matchup with the Chiefs, who clinched the #1 seed but would have lost the tiebreaker to Buffalo had they won the previous game, would be played on a neutral site due to special changes to playoff seeding in light of the previous game's cancellation.

=== Standings ===
==== Division ====
AFC East
	W	L	T	PCT	DIV	CONF	PF	PA	STK
^{(2)} Buffalo Bills	13	3	0	.813	4–2	9–2	455	286	W7
^{(7)} Miami Dolphins	9	8	0	.529	3–3	7–5	397	399	W1
New England Patriots	8	9	0	.471	3–3	6–6	364	347	L1
New York Jets	7	10	0	.412	2–4	5–7	296	316	L6

==== Conference ====
AFC
#	Team	Division	W	L	T	PCT	DIV	CONF	SOS	SOV	STK
**Division leaders**
1	Kansas City Chiefs	West	14	3	0	.824	6–0	9–3	.453	.422	W5
2	Buffalo Bills	East	13	3	0	.813	4–2	9–2	.489	.471	W7
3	Cincinnati Bengals	North	12	4	0	.750	3–3	8–3	.507	.490	W8
4	Jacksonville Jaguars	South	9	8	0	.529	4–2	8–4	.467	.438	W5
**Wild cards**
5 (Note: LA Chargers claimed the No. 5 seed over Baltimore based on conference record (7–5 vs. 6–6).)	Los Angeles Chargers	West	10	7	0	.588	2–4	7–5	.443	.341	L1
6	Baltimore Ravens	North	10	7	0	.588	3–3	6–6	.509	.456	L2
7 (Note: Miami finished ahead of Pittsburgh based on head-to-head victory, claiming the 7th and final playoff spot.)	Miami Dolphins	East	9	8	0	.529	3–3	7–5	.537	.457	W1
**Did not qualify for the postseason**
8	Pittsburgh Steelers	North	9	8	0	.529	3–3	5–7	.519	.451	W4
9	New England Patriots	East	8	9	0	.471	3–3	6–6	.502	.415	L1
10 (Note: NY Jets and Tennessee finished ahead of Cleveland based on conference record (5–7 vs. 4–8).) (Note: NY Jets finished ahead of Tennessee based on common record (3–3 vs. 2–4 against: Buffalo, Cincinnati, Denver, Green Bay, Jacksonville).)	New York Jets	East	7	10	0	.412	2–4	5–7	.538	.458	L6
11	Tennessee Titans	South	7	10	0	.412	3–3	5–7	.509	.336	L7
12	Cleveland Browns	North	7	10	0	.412	3–3	4–8	.524	.492	L1
13	Las Vegas Raiders	West	6	11	0	.353	3–3	5–7	.474	.397	L3
14	Denver Broncos	West	5	12	0	.294	1–5	3–9	.481	.465	W1
15	Indianapolis Colts	South	4	12	1	.265	1–4–1	4–7–1	.512	.500	L7
16	Houston Texans	South	3	13	1	.206	3–2–1	3–8–1	.481	.402	W1
**Tiebreakers** (Note: When breaking ties for three or more teams under the NFL's rules, they are first broken within divisions, then comparing only the highest ranked remaining team from each division.)

== Postseason ==
=== Schedule ===
Round	Date	Opponent (seed)	Result	Record	Venue	Recap
Wild Card	January 15	Miami Dolphins (7)	W 34–31	1–0	Highmark Stadium	Recap
Divisional	January 22	Cincinnati Bengals (3)	L 10–27	1–1	Highmark Stadium	Recap

=== Game summaries ===
==== AFC Wild Card Playoffs: vs. (7) Miami Dolphins ====
AFC Wild Card Playoffs: (7) Miami Dolphins at (2) Buffalo Bills – Game summary

Quarter	1	2	3	4	Total
Dolphins	0	17	7	7	31
Bills	14	6	14	0	34

at Highmark Stadium, Orchard Park, New York

- Date: January 15, 2023
- Game time: 1:00 p.m. EST
- Game weather: Sunny, 28 °F (−2 °C)
- Game attendance: 70,651
- Referee: Brad Allen
- TV announcers (CBS): Jim Nantz, Tony Romo, Tracy Wolfson, and Jay Feely
- Recap, Game Book

Game information

First quarter

- BUF – Dawson Knox 6-yard pass from Josh Allen (Tyler Bass kick), 7:57. Bills 7–0. Drive: 5 plays, 73 yards, 3:00.
- BUF – James Cook 12-yard rush (Tyler Bass kick), 5:07. Bills 14–0. Drive: 4 plays, 23 yards, 2:13.

Second quarter

- BUF – Tyler Bass 33 yard field goal, 12:46. Bills 17–0. Drive: 11 plays, 52 yards, 4:51.
- MIA – Jason Sanders 40 yard field goal, 7:34. Bills 17–3. Drive: 10 plays, 38 yards, 5:12.
- MIA – Jason Sanders 48-yard field goal, 2:15. Bills 17–6. Drive: 8 plays, 18 yards, 3:46.
- MIA – Jason Sanders 37-yard field goal, 1:15. Bills 17–9. Drive: 4 plays, 8 yards, 0:17.
- MIA – Mike Gesicki 7-yard pass from Skylar Thompson (Skylar Thompson-Tyreek Hill pass), 0:33. Tied 17–17. Drive: 4 plays, 18 yards, 0:20.
- BUF – Tyler Bass 39-yard field goal, 0:04. Bills 20–17. Drive: 6 plays, 54 yards, 0:29.

Third quarter

- MIA – Zach Sieler 5-yard fumble return (Jason Sanders kick), 13:59. Dolphins 24–20. Drive: 1 play, -18 yards, 0:08.
- BUF – Cole Beasley 6-yard pass from Josh Allen (Tyler Bass kick), 5:18. Bills 27–24. Drive: 5 plays, 33 yards, 2:11.
- BUF – Gabe Davis 23-yard pass from Josh Allen (Tyler Bass kick), 2:07. Bills 34–24. Drive: 5 plays, 68 yards, 2:07.

Fourth quarter

- MIA – Jeff Wilson Jr. 1-yard rush (Jason Sanders kick), 5:07. Bills 34–31. Drive: 11 plays, 75 yards, 6:14.

Top passers

- MIA – Skylar Thompson – 18/45, 220 yards, 1 TD, 2 INT
- BUF – Josh Allen – 23/39, 352 yards, 3 TD, 2 INT

Top rushers

- MIA – Jeff Wilson Jr. – 10 rushes, 23 yards, 1 TD
- BUF – Devin Singletary – 10 rushes, 48 yards

Top receivers

- MIA – Tyreek Hill – 7 receptions, 69 yards
- BUF – Stefon Diggs – 7 receptions, 114 yards

==== AFC Divisional Playoffs: vs. (3) Cincinnati Bengals ====
AFC Divisional Playoffs: (3) Cincinnati Bengals at (2) Buffalo Bills – Game summary

Quarter	1	2	3	4	Total
Bengals	14	3	7	3	27
Bills	0	7	3	0	10

at Highmark Stadium, Orchard Park, New York

- Date: January 22, 2023
- Game time: 3:05 p.m. EST
- Game weather: Snow, 34 °F (1 °C)
- Game attendance: 70,733
- Referee: Carl Cheffers
- TV announcers (CBS): Jim Nantz, Tony Romo, Tracy Wolfson and Jay Feely
- Recap, Game Book

Game information

First quarter

- CIN – Ja'Marr Chase 28-yard pass from Joe Burrow (Evan McPherson kick), 11:40. Bengals 7–0. Drive: 6 plays, 79 yards, 3:20.
- CIN – Hayden Hurst 15-yard pass from Joe Burrow (Evan McPherson kick), 3:47. Bengals 14–0. Drive: 10 plays, 72 yards, 6:15.

Second quarter

- BUF – Josh Allen 1-yard rush (Tyler Bass kick), 7:25. Bengals 14–7. Drive: 15 plays, 75 yards, 7:41.
- CIN – Evan McPherson 28-yard field goal, 1:49. Bengals 17–7. Drive: 14 plays, 65 yards, 5:36.

Third quarter

- BUF – Tyler Bass 25-yard field goal, 7:42. Bengals 17–10. Drive: 14 plays, 65 yards, 7:18.
- CIN – Joe Mixon 1-yard rush (Evan McPherson kick), 1:18. Bengals 24–10. Drive: 12 plays, 75 yards, 6:25.

Fourth quarter

- CIN – Evan McPherson 20-yard field goal, 11:22. Bengals 27–10. Drive: 9 plays, 61 yards, 3:40.

Top passers

- CIN – Joe Burrow – 23/36, 242 yards, 2 TD
- BUF – Josh Allen – 25/42, 264 yards, INT

Top rushers

- CIN – Joe Mixon – 20 rushes, 105 yards, 1 TD
- BUF – Josh Allen – 8 rushes, 26 yards, TD

Top receivers

- CIN – Ja'Marr Chase – 5 receptions, 61 yards, 1 TD
- BUF – Dawson Knox – 5 receptions, 65 yards

While the Bills were widely criticized by the media for losing this playoff game in blowout fashion, several players on the team revealed their emotional exhaustion after the game due to several events that occurred to the team and the city of Buffalo during the course of the season and offseason, including Hamlin's collapse, two severe blizzards, including one during Christmas that killed dozens in Erie County, owner Kim Pegula suffering "unspecified health issues" in June that were later revealed by her daughter Jessica Pegula to be cardiac arrest, and the 2022 Buffalo shooting in May. Guard Rodger Saffold and safety Micah Hyde stated that the team had "run out of gas" after facing constant adversity throughout the "emotionally draining" season.
