= Matt Milano =

American football player (born 1994)

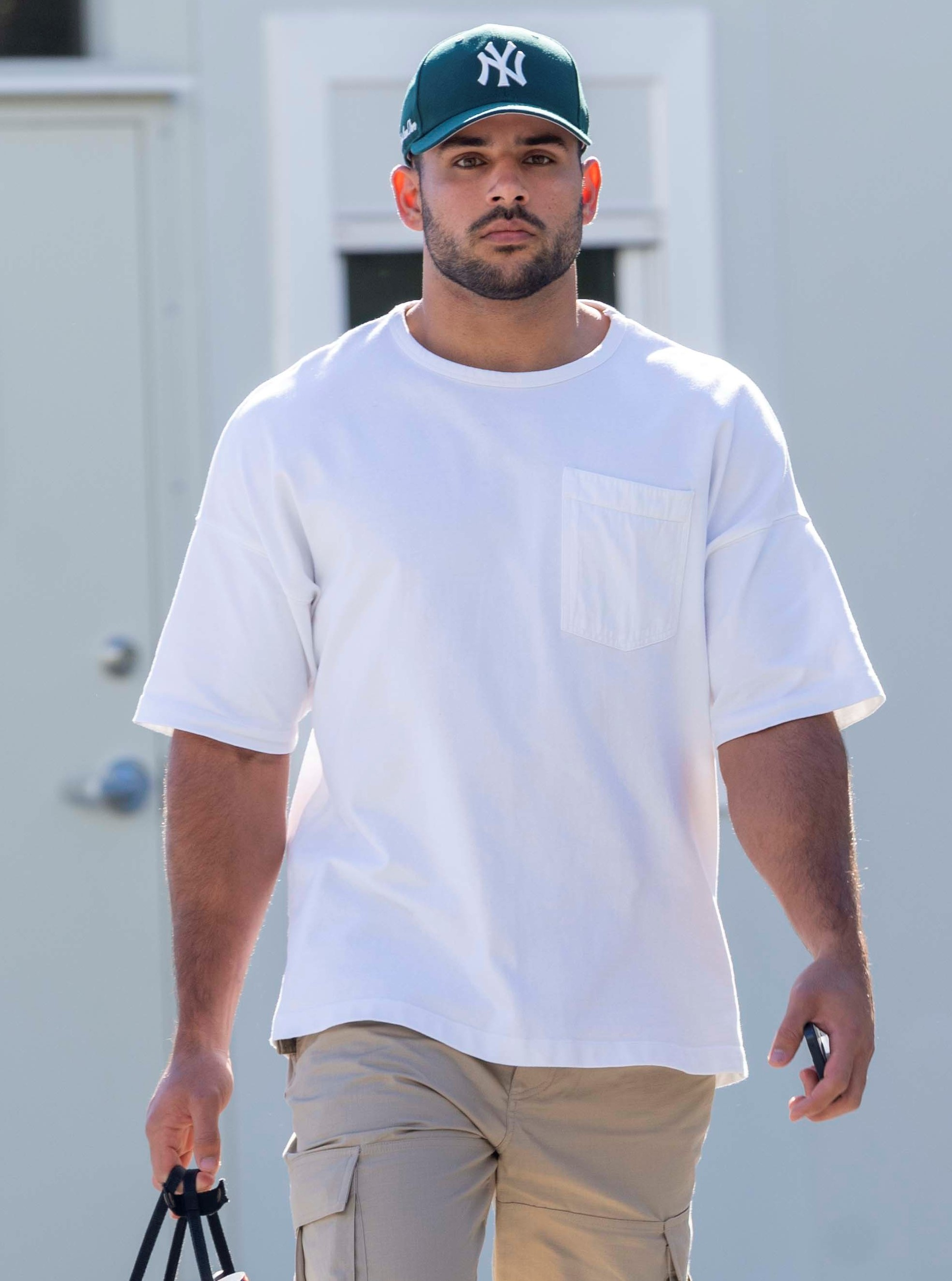
- Milano in 2021

Profile
- Position: Linebacker

Personal information
- Born: July 28, 1994 (age 32); Commack, New York, U.S.
- Listed height: 6 ft 0 in (1.83 m)
- Listed weight: 223 lb (101 kg)

Career information
- High school: Dr. Phillips (Orlando, Florida)
- College: Boston College (2013–2016)
- NFL draft: 2017: 5th round, 163rd overall pick

Career history
- Buffalo Bills (2017–2025)

Awards and highlights
- First-team All-Pro (2022); Pro Bowl (2022)

Career NFL statistics as of 2025
- Total tackles: 571
- Sacks: 14
- Forced fumbles: 4
- Fumble recoveries: 11
- Interceptions: 10
- Pass deflections: 39
- Defensive touchdowns: 2
- Stats at Pro Football Reference

Matthew Vincent Milano (born July 28, 1994) is an American professional football linebacker. He played college football for the Boston College Eagles. Drafted by the Bills in the 5th round of the 2017 NFL draft, Milano became a central part of former head coach Sean McDermott's defense and is considered one of the best defensive players in Bills franchise history.

== Early life ==
Milano and his siblings Gina and Michael, were born to Janet and Mike Milano. He attended Dr. Phillips High School in Orlando, Florida where he played defensive back with the Panthers football team. Between his junior and senior seasons, Milano earned various team, district and conference honors. During the 2012 season, Milano was team captain. During his senior season, Milano was awarded Defensive Player of the Year, recording 100 tackles, including 18 tackles for loss and three sacks. He graduated in 2013. Milano was rated a three-star linebacker recruit by 247Sports and Rivals.com, committing to Boston College to play college football over offers from Air Force, Arizona, Bowling Green, Miami (OH), and Stony Brook.

== College career ==
Milano attended and played college football at Boston College under head coach Steve Addazio.

Upon receiving the Westerman Family Flynn Fund Scholarship, Milano committed to Boston College, signing as early as July 2012.

During his true freshman season in 2013, Milano first joined the field during the BC Eagle's season-opening home game defeating Villanova. Across 13 games, Milano finished his debuting season with a record of five tackles, including four solo tackles. During his sophomore season in 2014, Milano was part of the Eagles' defensive team that ranked second in the nation. Across 12 games in which he played, Milano recorded 18 tackles, including 15 solo tackles and participated in close to 300 plays. Milano's junior season in 2015 saw him earn multiple honorable mentions as he started 11 of 12 games as a strong side linebacker. During Milano's senior season in 2016, he received the William J. Flynn Most Valuable Player award for his season performance including 13 games that totaled 58 tackles, of which 41 were unassisted.

While at Boston College, Milano majored in applied psychology and human development.

== Professional career ==
Pre-draft measurables
Height	Weight	Arm length	Hand span	Wingspan	40-yard dash	10-yard split	20-yard split	Vertical jump	Broad jump	Bench press
6 ft 0 1/2 in (1.84 m)	223 lb (101 kg)	32 in (0.81 m)	9 3/8 in (0.24 m)	6 ft 3 5/8 in (1.92 m)	4.67 s	1.67 s	2.72 s	35.0 in (0.89 m)	10 ft 6 in (3.20 m)	24 reps
All values from NFL Combine

=== 2017 ===
The Buffalo Bills selected Milano in the fifth round (163rd overall) of the 2017 NFL draft. The pick used to draft him was given by the New England Patriots as compensation for the Patriots signing restricted free agent running back Mike Gillislee. He was the first of two linebackers Buffalo selected, along with Boise State's Tanner Vallejo.

On May 11, 2017, the Bills signed Milano to a four-year, $2.66 million contract that included a signing bonus of $261,506.

Throughout training camp, Milano competed against veterans Ramon Humber and Gerald Hodges for the job as the starting weak side linebacker. Head coach Sean McDermott named Milano the backup weakside linebacker behind Humber to begin the regular season.

On October 8, 2017, Milano earned his first career start and recorded four combined tackles during a 20–16 road loss to the Cincinnati Bengals. He earned the start in place of strongside linebacker Ramon Humber, who was ruled inactive due to a broken hand suffered the previous week. On October 22, 2017, he had an impressive performance in his second consecutive start, making five combined tackles, two tackles for a loss, a pass deflection, and recorded his first career interception in the Bills' 30–27 victory over the Tampa Bay Buccaneers. His first career interception was off a pass attempt by Jameis Winston and he returned it 15 yards and received the game ball from head coach Sean McDermott. In Week 8, Milano collected four combined tackles and scored his first career touchdown in the 34–14 win against the Oakland Raiders. In the second quarter of that game, cornerback Leonard Johnson forced a fumble by Raiders' running back DeAndré Washington, that was recovered by Milano and returned 40 yards for a touchdown. The following week, against the New York Jets, Humber resumed his starting role at weakside linebacker and Milano returned to a reserve role.

On December 10, 2017, Milano was named the starting weakside linebacker over Humber and recorded a season-high 11 combined tackles in a 13–7 victory against the Indianapolis Colts. The next day, defensive coordinator Leslie Frazier stated Milano would remain the starting weakside linebacker barring any unforeseen circumstances. During a Week 17 matchup at the Miami Dolphins, Milano recorded six combined tackles, but ultimately left the 22–16 victory after suffering a hamstring injury. He was listed as inactive and missed the Bills 10–3 AFC Wild Card Round loss at the Jacksonville Jaguars. Milano finished his rookie season with 49 combined tackles (32 solo), two pass deflections, one interception, and a fumble recovery in 16 games and five starts.

=== 2018 ===
In Week 3, Milano recorded a sack, an interception, a fumble recovery, two passes defensed and eight tackles in a 27–6 win over the Minnesota Vikings, earning him AFC Defensive Player of the Week. In Week 14, Milano suffered a broken fibula and underwent season-ending surgery. He was placed on injured reserve on December 11, 2018. Milano finished his second professional season with 78 combined tackles, one sack, and three interceptions.

=== 2019 ===
Milano returned from injury, recording a career high 100 combined tackles along with 1.5 sacks and a forced fumble in 15 starts. As Buffalo also returned to the playoffs, the team faced the Houston Texans in the Wild Card Round. Milano had a game-high 12 tackles, but as the game went into overtime, Milano and Bills safety Siran Neal failed to sack Texans quarterback Deshaun Watson, who spun out of the tackle attempt and completed a pass which set up Houston's game-winning field goal, sealing a 22–19 Bills loss.

=== 2020 ===
In Week 1 against the Jets, Milano recorded his first interception of the season during the 27–17 win. He was placed on injured reserve on November 7, 2020, after dealing with a pectoral injury since Week 4. He was activated on December 7. In the 2020 season, he appeared in ten games and started five. He finished with 3.5 sacks, 45 total tackles, one interception, and three passes defended.

In the Bills' three postseason games, Milano started and had 25 total tackles and three passes defended.

=== 2021 ===
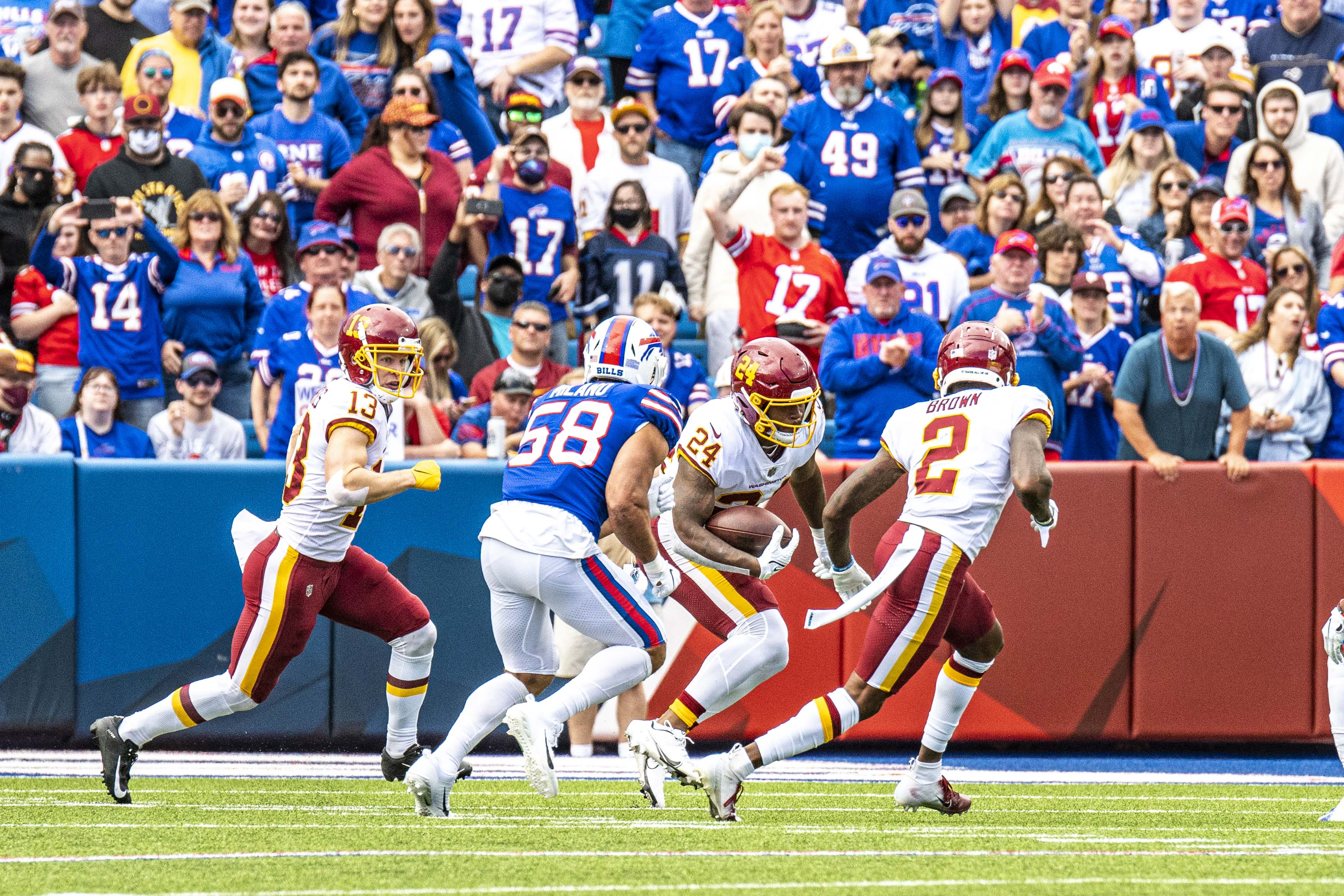
Milano against Washington in 2021

On March 11, 2021, Milano signed a four-year, $44 million contract extension with the Bills. He recorded his first sack of the season in Buffalo's week 2 35–0 victory over the Dolphins. He recorded a season-high nine tackles in week 10 during a 45–17 win over the Jets. Milano finished the season with 86 total tackles, three sacks, a career-high 15 tackles for a loss and five passes defended, as Buffalo finished the season 11–6 and won the AFC East for the second consecutive season.

=== 2022 ===
In Week 2 against the Tennessee Titans, Milano recorded an interception off of Ryan Tannehill and returned it 43 yards for a touchdown in the 41–7 win. In Week 11, he had 12 tackles, three for a loss, a sack, and a fumble recovery in a 31–23 win over the Cleveland Browns, earning AFC Defensive Player of the Week. He finished the 2022 season with 1.5 sacks, 99 total tackles, three interceptions, and 11 passes defended. He had an outstanding performance in Buffalo's two playoff games at the end of the season, racking up a total of 20 combined tackles and three sacks. Milano was named to the 2023 Pro Bowl Games after Pittsburgh Steelers linebacker T. J. Watt forwent the games due to injury. He earned first team All-Pro honors. He was ranked 69th by his fellow players on the NFL Top 100 Players of 2023.

=== 2023 ===
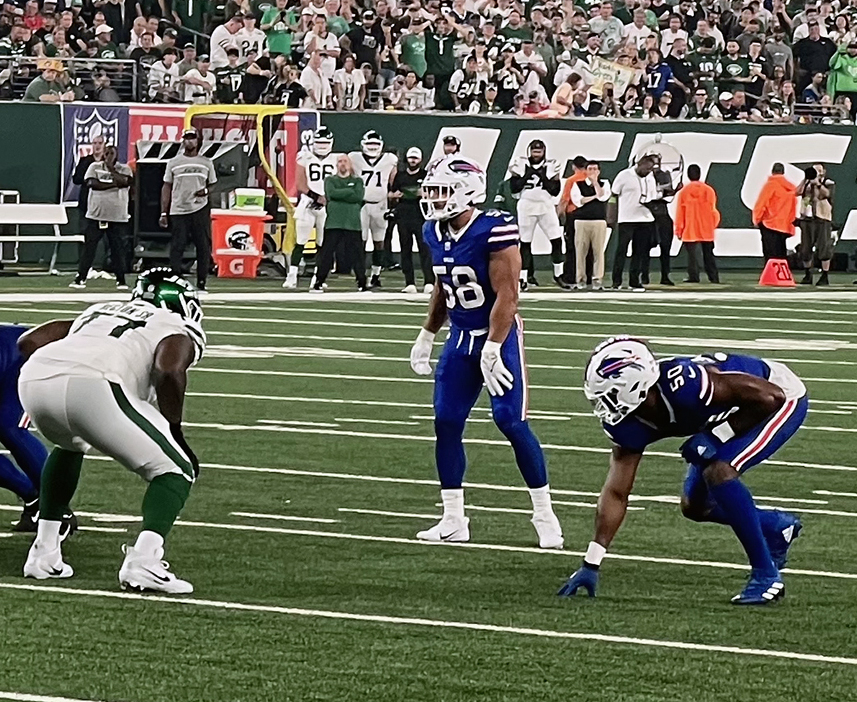
Milano (#58) and teammate Greg Rousseau (#50) line up against the New York Jets in 2023

On March 12, 2023, Milano signed a two-year contract extension with the Bills, keeping him under contract through the 2026 season.

In Week 5 against the Jaguars, Milano suffered a season-ending fractured leg injury in the 25-20 loss and was placed on injured reserve on October 11, 2023.

=== 2024 ===
On August 15, 2024, it was announced that Milano had suffered a torn biceps in practice and would undergo surgery that would rule him out indefinitely. He was activated on November 30. He had a sack in two of the Bills' three postseason games.

=== 2025 ===
On March 18, 2025, Milano and the Bills restructured his contract, taking a $3 million pay cut that could be earned back through incentives and making him a free agent after the 2025 season. In the 2025 season, he had 3.5 sacks and 67 total tackles.

== Career statistics ==
Legend
**Bold**	Career high

=== NFL ===
==== Regular season ====
Year	Team	Games		Tackles					Interceptions				Fumbles		
Year	Team	GP	GS	Cmb	Solo	Ast	Sck	TFL	Int	Yds	TD	PD	FF	FR	TD
2017	BUF	16	5	49	32	17	0.0	7	1	15	0	2	**1**	1	**1**
2018	BUF	13	13	78	52	26	1.0	12	**3**	41	0	7	0	**3**	0
2019	BUF	15	15	**101**	65	**36**	1.5	7	0	0	0	9	**1**	1	0
2020	BUF	10	5	45	35	10	**3.5**	4	1	0	0	3	0	0	0
2021	BUF	16	16	86	57	29	3.0	**15**	0	0	0	5	0	2	0
2022	BUF	15	15	99	**72**	27	1.5	12	**3**	**84**	**1**	**11**	0	2	0
2023	BUF	5	5	30	18	12	0.0	1	2	16	0	2	**1**	0	0
2024	BUF	4	4	16	7	9	0.0	1	0	0	0	0	0	2	0
2025	BUF	12	12	67	36	31	**3.5**	7	0	0	0	0	**1**	0	0
Career		106	90	571	374	197	14.0	66	10	156	1	39	4	11	1

==== Postseason ====
Year	Team	Games		Tackles					Interceptions				Fumbles		
Year	Team	GP	GS	Cmb	Solo	Ast	Sck	TFL	Int	Yds	TD	PD	FF	FR	TD
2019	BUF	1	1	12	8	4	0.0	1	0	0	0	0	0	0	0
2020	BUF	3	3	**25**	**16**	**9**	0.0	0	0	0	0	**3**	0	0	0
2021	BUF	2	2	16	10	6	0.0	0	0	0	0	1	0	0	0
2022	BUF	2	2	20	15	5	**3.0**	**4**	0	0	0	1	0	0	0
2023	BUF	0	0	Did not play due to injury											
2024	BUF	3	3	17	12	5	2.0	1	0	0	0	0	0	0	0
2025	BUF	2	2	8	6	2	0.0	1	0	0	0	1	0	0	0
Career		13	13	98	67	31	5.0	7	0	0	0	6	0	0	0

=== College ===
Season	Team	GP	Tackles					Interceptions				Fumbles	
Season	Team	GP	Cmb	Solo	Ast	TfL	Sck	Int	Yds	Avg	TD	FR	FF
2013	Boston College	4	5	4	1	0	0.0	0	0	0.0	0	0	0
2014	Boston College	7	18	15	3	3	1.0	0	0	0.0	0	**2**	0
2015	Boston College	12	58	**46**	12	**17.5**	**6.5**	0	0	0.0	0	1	**2**
2016	Boston College	13	**59**	42	**17**	12	**6.5**	**1**	**19**	**19.0**	**1**	1	0
Career		36	140	107	33	32.5	14.0	1	19	19.0	1	5	2
