= 2023 Pro Bowl Games =

National Football League all-star games

AFC	NFC
33	35
Head coach: Peyton Manning	Head coach: Eli Manning
- Date: February 2 and 5, 2023
- Stadium: Intermountain Healthcare Performance Center, Henderson, Nevada, Bear's Best Golf Course, Summerlin South, Nevada, Allegiant Stadium, Paradise, Nevada
- Attendance: 58,331

Ceremonies
- National anthem: Jessie James Decker
- Halftime show: Rae Sremmurd

TV in the United States
- Network: ESPN; ABC; ESPN+ Disney XD
- Announcers: Pat McAfee (play–by–play), Kirk Herbstreit (color), Laura Rutledge, and Robert Griffin III (sideline reporters)

The 2023 Pro Bowl Games (branded as the 2023 Pro Bowl Games presented by Verizon for sponsorship reasons) was the National Football League's all-star game for the 2022 NFL season. For the first time, the event consisted of skills competitions and non-contact flag football games, rather than an actual tackle football game. It was held at Allegiant Stadium in Paradise, Nevada, the Intermountain Healthcare Performance Center in Henderson, Nevada, and Bear's Best Golf Course in Las Vegas, Nevada on February 2 and 5, 2023. Voting began on November 15, 2022, and the rosters were announced on December 21, 2022.

== Background ==
The NFL announced on August 9, 2022, that Allegiant Stadium in Paradise, Nevada, would host the Pro Bowl for the second consecutive season.

On September 26, 2022, the league announced a partnership with Peyton Manning's Omaha Productions to revamp the Pro Bowl, replacing the Pro Bowl game with skills competitions throughout the week, culminating with non-contact flag football games on Sunday to determine the winner. A. Smith & Co. produced the skills competition. On December 5, 2022, it was announced that the coaches for the Pro Bowl would be Peyton and his brother Eli Manning.

== Format ==
The event consisted of various skill competition events and three 7-on-7 flag football games, with the first block of events being held on February 2, 2023, at the Intermountain Healthcare Performance Center, which is the Las Vegas Raiders' practice facility and Bear's Best Golf Course in Las Vegas, Nevada. On February 5, the remainder of the event program took place at Allegiant Stadium with the exception of Kick Tac Toe which was held at the Intermountain Healthcare Performance Center. The first portion took place behind closed doors, while the last contests took place around the flag football games.

Points were scored across the events, with up to 24 points available in the skills competitions. The first two flag football games awarded six points each to the winning conference's total score (with the conferences splitting three points each in the event of a tie, with no overtime being played). Both teams' total scores were carried into the final game, which decided the overall winner.

== Rosters ==
=== AFC ===
Offense
Position	Starter(s)	Reserve(s)	Alternate(s)
Quarterback	15 Patrick Mahomes, Kansas City^{[c]}	17 Josh Allen, Buffalo^{[b]} 9 Joe Burrow, Cincinnati^{[d]}	2 Tyler Huntley, Baltimore^{[a]} 16 Trevor Lawrence, Jacksonville^{[a]} 4 Derek Carr, Las Vegas^{[a]}
Running back	24 Nick Chubb, Cleveland	28 Josh Jacobs, Las Vegas; 22 Derrick Henry, Tennessee	
Fullback	42 Patrick Ricard, Baltimore		
Wide receiver	10 Tyreek Hill, Miami; 14 Stefon Diggs, Buffalo	1 Ja'Marr Chase, Cincinnati; 17 Davante Adams, Las Vegas	
Tight end	87 Travis Kelce, Kansas City^{[c]}	89 Mark Andrews, Baltimore	88 Dawson Knox, Buffalo^{[a]}
Offensive tackle	78 Laremy Tunsil, Houston; 72 Terron Armstead, Miami	57 Orlando Brown Jr., Kansas City^{[c]}	73 Dion Dawkins, Buffalo^{[a]}
Offensive guard	56 Quenton Nelson, Indianapolis^{[b]} 75 Joel Bitonio, Cleveland	62 Joe Thuney, Kansas City^{[c]}	76 Rodger Saffold, Buffalo^{[a]} 77 Wyatt Teller, Cleveland^{[a]}
Center	52 Creed Humphrey, Kansas City^{[c]}	60 Mitch Morse, Buffalo	60 Ben Jones, Tennessee^{[a]}

Defense
Position	Starter(s)	Reserve(s)	Alternate(s)
Defensive end	95 Myles Garrett, Cleveland; 98 Maxx Crosby, Las Vegas	91 Trey Hendrickson, Cincinnati	
Defensive tackle	95 Chris Jones, Kansas City^{[c]} 95 Quinnen Williams, NY Jets	98 Jeffery Simmons, Tennessee	97 Cameron Heyward, Pittsburgh^{[a]}
Outside linebacker	9 Matthew Judon, New England; 52 Khalil Mack, LA Chargers^{[b]}	90 T. J. Watt, Pittsburgh^{[b]}	58 Matt Milano, Buffalo^{[a]} 2 Bradley Chubb, Miami^{[a]}
Inside / middle linebacker	18 Roquan Smith, Baltimore	57 C. J. Mosley, NY Jets	
Cornerback	1 Sauce Gardner, NY Jets; 2 Patrick Surtain II, Denver	44 Marlon Humphrey, Baltimore; 25 Xavien Howard, Miami	
Free safety	39 Minkah Fitzpatrick, Pittsburgh		
Strong safety	3 Derwin James, LA Chargers	21 Jordan Poyer, Buffalo	

Special teams
Position	Starter	Alternate(s)
Long snapper	46 Morgan Cox, Tennessee	
Punter	5 Tommy Townsend, Kansas City^{[c]}	6 A. J. Cole III, Las Vegas^{[a]}
Placekicker	9 Justin Tucker, Baltimore	
Return specialist	13 Devin Duvernay, Baltimore^{[b]}	39 Jamal Agnew, Jacksonville^{[a]}
Special teams	34 Justin Hardee, NY Jets	

bold player who participated in the game
italics signifies a rookie
(C) signifies the player has been selected as a captain
^{a} Replacement player selection due to injury or vacancy
^{b} Injured player; selected but did not participate
^{c} Selected but did not play because his team advanced to Super Bowl LVII (See Pro Bowl "Player selection" section)
^{d} Selected but chose not to participate

=== NFC ===
Offense
Position	Starter(s)	Reserve(s)	Alternate(s)
Quarterback	1 Jalen Hurts, Philadelphia^{[c]}	7 Geno Smith, Seattle; 8 Kirk Cousins, Minnesota	16 Jared Goff, Detroit^{[a]}
Running back	26 Saquon Barkley, NY Giants	20 Tony Pollard, Dallas^{[b]} 26 Miles Sanders, Philadelphia^{[c]}	4 Dalvin Cook, Minnesota^{[a]} 23 Christian McCaffrey, San Francisco^{[a]}
Fullback	44 Kyle Juszczyk, San Francisco		
Wide receiver	18 Justin Jefferson, Minnesota; 11 A. J. Brown, Philadelphia^{[c]}	88 CeeDee Lamb, Dallas; 17 Terry McLaurin, Washington	14 Amon-Ra St. Brown, Detroit^{[a]}
Tight end	85 George Kittle, San Francisco	87 T. J. Hockenson, Minnesota	
Offensive tackle	71 Trent Williams, San Francisco; 65 Lane Johnson, Philadelphia^{[c]}	78 Tristan Wirfs, Tampa Bay	58 Penei Sewell, Detroit^{[a]}
Offensive guard	70 Zack Martin, Dallas; 69 Landon Dickerson, Philadelphia^{[c]}	63 Chris Lindstrom, Atlanta	74 Elgton Jenkins, Green Bay^{[a]}
Center	62 Jason Kelce, Philadelphia^{[c]}	77 Frank Ragnow, Detroit	63 Tyler Biadasz, Dallas^{[a]}

Defense
Position	Starter(s)	Reserve(s)	Alternate(s)
Defensive end	97 Nick Bosa, San Francisco^{[b]} 53 Brian Burns, Carolina	90 DeMarcus Lawrence, Dallas	94 Cameron Jordan, New Orleans ^{[a]}
Defensive tackle	99 Aaron Donald, LA Rams^{[b]} 93 Jonathan Allen, Washington	97 Dexter Lawrence, NY Giants	94 Daron Payne, Washington^{[a]}
Outside linebacker	11 Micah Parsons, Dallas; 55 Za'Darius Smith, Minnesota	7 Haason Reddick, Philadelphia^{[c]}	99 Danielle Hunter, Minnesota^{[a]}
Inside / middle linebacker	54 Fred Warner, San Francisco	56 Demario Davis, New Orleans	
Cornerback	2 Darius Slay, Philadelphia^{[c]} 7 Trevon Diggs, Dallas	27 Tariq Woolen, Seattle; 23 Jaire Alexander, Green Bay	5 Jalen Ramsey, LA Rams^{[a]}
Free safety	6 Quandre Diggs, Seattle		
Strong safety	3 Budda Baker, Arizona	29 Talanoa Hufanga, San Francisco	

Special teams
Position	Starter	Alternate(s)
Long snapper	42 Andrew DePaola, Minnesota	
Punter	5 Tress Way, Washington	
Placekicker	5 Jason Myers, Seattle	
Return specialist	9 KaVontae Turpin, Dallas	
Special teams	39 Jeremy Reaves, Washington	

Bold, player who participated in the game
italics signifies a rookie
(C) signifies the player has been selected as a captain
^{a} Replacement player selection due to injury or vacancy
^{b} Injured player; selected but did not participate
^{c} Selected but did not play because his team advanced to Super Bowl LVII (See Pro Bowl "Player selection" section)
^{d} Selected but chose not to participate

== Number of selections per team ==
American Football Conference
Team	Selections
Baltimore Ravens	7
Buffalo Bills	8
Cincinnati Bengals	3
Cleveland Browns	4
Denver Broncos	1
Houston Texans	1
Indianapolis Colts	1
Jacksonville Jaguars	2
Kansas City Chiefs	7
Las Vegas Raiders	5
Los Angeles Chargers	2
Miami Dolphins	4
New England Patriots	1
New York Jets	4
Pittsburgh Steelers	3
Tennessee Titans	4

National Football Conference
Team	Selections
Arizona Cardinals	1
Atlanta Falcons	1
Carolina Panthers	1
Chicago Bears	0
Dallas Cowboys	8
Detroit Lions	4
Green Bay Packers	2
Los Angeles Rams	2
Minnesota Vikings	7
New Orleans Saints	2
New York Giants	2
Philadelphia Eagles	8
San Francisco 49ers	7
Seattle Seahawks	4
Tampa Bay Buccaneers	1
Washington Commanders	5

== Results ==
=== Thursday ===
==== Precision Passing ====
Derek Carr won the event for the AFC with a score of 31.

Pos	Player	Team	Score
1	Derek Carr	LVS	31
2	Tyler Huntley	BAL	21
3	Geno Smith	SEA	20
4	Trevor Lawrence	JAX	19
5	Jared Goff	DET	15
6	Kirk Cousins	MIN	14

Conference	Score
AFC	3
NFC	0

==== Lightning Round ====
The AFC won the event after dunking NFC head coach Eli Manning in confetti in the final round.

Conference	Score
AFC	6
NFC	0

==== Longest Drive ====
A long drive competition among players was held at Bear's Best Golf Course in Summerlin South, Nevada, during the week, and broadcast on tape-delay during the Pro Bowl Games.

Jordan Poyer won the event for the AFC by having the longest drive with a drive of 320 yards (292.608 meters).

Conference	Score
AFC	9
NFC	0

==== Dodgeball ====
The NFC won the event after the NFC offense team defeated the AFC defense team in the final round.

Conference	Score
AFC	9
NFC	3

=== Sunday ===
==== Flag Football Game 1 ====
The NFC won the first flag football game by a score of 33 – 27.

Team	1st Half	2nd Half	Final
AFC	20	7	27
NFC	20	13	33

Conference	Score
AFC	9
NFC	9

==== Kick Tac Toe ====
The event was shown as pre-recorded segment and was held at Intermountain Healthcare center from Thursday's events.

The AFC won the event after being the first team to get three in a row.

Conference	Score
AFC	12
NFC	9

==== Gridiron Gauntlet ====
The NFC won the event after Eli Manning crossed the finish line first.

Conference	Score
AFC	12
NFC	12

==== Flag Football Game 2 ====
The AFC won the second flag football game by a score of 18–13.

Team	1st Half	2nd Half	Final
AFC	12	6	18
NFC	6	7	13

Conference	Score
AFC	18
NFC	12

==== Move The Chains ====
The AFC won the event after taking the first and third rounds.

Conference	Score
AFC	21
NFC	12

==== Best Catch ====
Amon-Ra St. Brown outscored Stefon Diggs by a score of 177.0–145.4 (St. Brown outscored Diggs 85.0–74.7 in round 1 and 92.0–70.7 in round 2), winning the event for the NFC.

Diggs and St. Brown were selected as finalists in a fan vote over Justin Jefferson and Patrick Surtain II retrospectively. Each were shown doing special catches in pre-recorded segments during Thursday's events before the fan vote began.

Conference	Score
AFC	21
NFC	15

==== Flag Football Game 3 ====
The NFC was down 21–15 entering the game based on the opening scores, but Kirk Cousins led the NFC to a comeback win. The final score was 35–33.

Conference	Opening Score	1st Half	2nd Half	Final
AFC	21	6	6	33
NFC	15	13	7	35

== Aftermath ==
The players who participated on the winning NFC each won $84,000 while the players who participated on the losing AFC team won $42,000 each.

This was the first time Eli Manning beat his brother in the NFL (though as a coach and not a player), as Peyton went 3–0 against him during their NFL careers.

Following the event it was revealed that Myles Garrett suffered a dislocated toe during the Gridiron Gauntlet event. He later stated in April that he would decline participating in future Pro Bowl Games events, saying the Gridiron Gauntlet "doesn't make sense to me", and proposed replacing it and other events with those that would allow fans to take part alongside players. Garrett would later recover from his injury and would play in the opening games of the 2023 NFL season. He would later change his mind and participate in the “Move the Chains” event during the 2024 Pro Bowl Games.

== Broadcasting ==
ESPN and ABC served as the broadcaster for all Pro Bowl events while the Thursday block of the skills competition were held on the Saturday afternoon after the event on ABC. As in previous years, the events held on Sunday were simulcast live by ESPN+, ABC, and Disney XD. Kirk Herbstreit and Pat McAfee called the games. Robert Griffin III, Marcus Spears, and Laura Rutledge called the skills competition, joined additionally on the first night by Ryan Clark and Dan Orlovsky.
