= Dawson Knox =

American football player (born 1996)

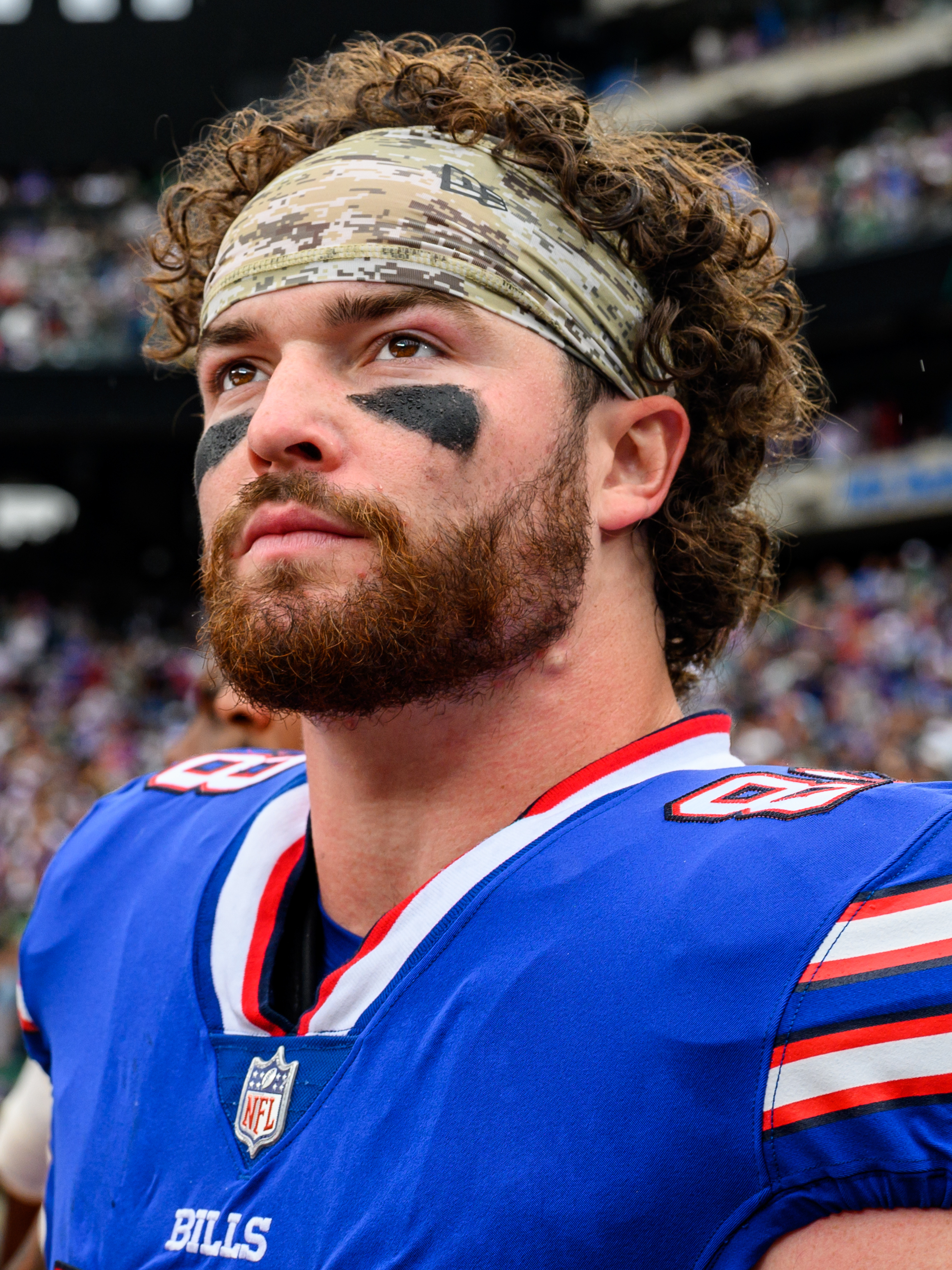
- Knox with the Buffalo Bills in 2022

No. 88 – Buffalo Bills
- Position: Tight end
- Roster status: Active

Personal information
- Born: November 14, 1996 (age 30); Brentwood, Tennessee, U.S.
- Listed height: 6 ft 4 in (1.93 m)
- Listed weight: 254 lb (115 kg)

Career information
- High school: Brentwood Academy (TN)
- College: Ole Miss (2015–2018)
- NFL draft: 2019: 3rd round, 96th overall pick

Career history
- Buffalo Bills (2019–present)

Awards and highlights
- Pro Bowl (2022)

Career NFL statistics as of Week 11, 2026
- Receptions: 245
- Receiving yards: 2,811
- Receiving touchdowns: 28
- Stats at Pro Football Reference

Dawson Alan Knox (born November 14, 1996) is an American professional football tight end for the Buffalo Bills of the National Football League (NFL). He played college football for the Ole Miss Rebels and was selected by the Bills in the third round of the 2019 NFL draft.

== Early life ==
Knox attended St. Paul Christian Academy and Brentwood Academy in Brentwood, Tennessee. He played wide receiver and quarterback for the high school football team. He played in only one game his senior season due to an ankle injury.

== College career ==
Knox joined the University of Mississippi (Ole Miss) as a walk-on fullback in 2015. He played at Ole Miss until 2018. During his career, he had 39 receptions for 605 yards. After his junior season in 2018, he decided to forgo his senior year and enter the 2019 NFL draft.

=== College statistics ===
Dawson Knox					Receiving			
Season	Team	Conf	Pos	GP	Rec	Yds	Avg	TD
2015	Ole Miss	SEC	TE	0	Redshirt			
2016	Ole Miss	SEC	TE	1	0	0	0.0	0
2017	Ole Miss	SEC	TE	8	24	321	13.4	0
2018	Ole Miss	SEC	TE	9	15	284	18.9	0
Career				18	39	605	15.5	0

== Professional career ==
Pre-draft measurables
Height	Weight	Arm length	Hand span	Wingspan	40-yard dash	10-yard split	20-yard split	20-yard shuttle	Three-cone drill	Vertical jump	Broad jump	Bench press
6 ft 4 3/8 in (1.94 m)	254 lb (115 kg)	33 1/2 in (0.85 m)	9 3/4 in (0.25 m)	6 ft 8 1/2 in (2.04 m)	4.59 s	1.57 s	2.66 s	4.27 s	7.02 s	34.5 in (0.88 m)	10 ft 2 in (3.10 m)	16 reps
All values from NFL Combine/Pro Day

The Buffalo Bills selected Knox in the third round with the 96th overall pick in the 2019 NFL draft. Knox signed his rookie contract with the team on June 14, 2019.

On September 22, 2019, Knox caught his first NFL touchdown from Josh Allen against the Cincinnati Bengals in Week 3. He had a hand in the Bills' game-winning drive, catching another reception from Allen for 49 yards and running over two Bengals defenders along the way to set up a touchdown run by Frank Gore. Knox finished with three receptions for 67 yards and a touchdown as the Bills won 21–17. Knox had an up-and-down rookie season, catching 28 of 50 targets for 388 yards and two touchdowns.

On October 24, 2020, Knox was placed on the reserve/COVID-19 list after testing positive for the virus. He was activated on November 5. Knox played in 12 games, starting seven, in 2020, catching 24 passes for 288 yards and three touchdowns. In Buffalo's Wild Card Round victory over the Indianapolis Colts, Knox caught two passes for five yards, including a two-yard touchdown from Josh Allen in the first quarter of the Bills' eventual 27–24 victory. In the AFC Championship against the Kansas City Chiefs, Knox recorded six catches for 42 yards and a touchdown during the 38–24 loss.

Knox became a more prominent part of the Bills' passing attack in 2021. In Week 4, in a 40–0 victory over the Houston Texans, he had two receiving touchdowns. In Week 5 against the Chiefs, he had three receptions for 117 yards and a touchdown in the 38–20 victory. During Thanksgiving Day against the New Orleans Saints, he caught two touchdowns to raise his season total to 7, overtaking Buffalo's franchise record for most receiving touchdowns in a season by a tight end.

On September 7, 2022, the Bills signed Knox to a four-year $53.6 million extension, making him one of the top paid tight ends in the league. Knox finished the 2022 season with 48 receptions for 517 receiving yards and six receiving touchdowns. He scored a receiving touchdown in the Bills' 34–31 Wild Card Round victory over the Miami Dolphins.

The Bills drafted tight end Dalton Kincaid in the first round of the 2023 NFL draft to complement Knox, signaling an intent to use more double tight end formations on offense. On October 26, 2023, Knox was placed on injured reserve after undergoing wrist surgery. He was activated on December 9. He had 22 receptions for 186 yards and two touchdowns in the 2023 season. In the Wild Card Round win against the Steelers, he had a receiving touchdown. In the 2024 season, Knox had 22 receptions for 311 yards and one touchdown.

In Week 14 of the 2025 season, Knox led the Bills in receiving in their come-from-behind 39–34 win over the Bengals with 93 yards. The following week, he scored 2 touchdowns to help the Bills overcome a 21–0 deficit and beat the New England Patriots 35–31, also surpassing Pete Metzelaars's team record for most career touchdowns by a tight end. He finished the 2025 season with 36 receptions for 417 yards and four touchdowns.

On March 10, 2026, Knox re-signed with the Bills on a three-year contract.

== NFL career statistics ==
Legend
**Bold**	Career high

=== Regular season ===
Year	Team	Games		Receiving					Rushing					Fumbles	
Year	Team	GP	GS	Rec	Yds	Y/R	Lng	TD	Att	Yds	Y/A	Lng	TD	Fum	Lost
2019	BUF	15	11	28	388	13.9	49	2	**1**	**9**	**9.0**	**9**	0	0	0
2020	BUF	12	7	24	288	12.0	36	3	—	—	—	—	—	**2**	**2**
2021	BUF	15	14	**49**	**587**	12.0	**53**	**9**	0	4	—	4	0	0	0
2022	BUF	15	15	48	517	10.8	45	6	—	—	—	—	—	0	0
2023	BUF	12	11	22	186	8.5	17	2	—	—	—	—	—	0	0
2024	BUF	16	13	22	311	**14.1**	39	1	—	—	—	—	—	0	0
2025	BUF	17	12	36	417	11.6	32	4	—	—	—	—	—	0	0
2026	BUF	10	10	16	117	7.3	12	1	1	0	0.0	0	0	0	0
Career		112	93	245	2,811	11.5	53	28	2	13	6.5	9	0	2	2

=== Postseason ===
Year	Team	Games		Receiving					Rushing					Fumbles	
Year	Team	GP	GS	Rec	Yds	Y/R	Lng	TD	Att	Yds	Y/A	Lng	TD	Fum	Lost
2019	BUF	1	1	1	14	**14.0**	14	0	—	—	—	—	—	0	0
2020	BUF	3	2	**10**	65	6.5	14	**2**	—	—	—	—	—	0	0
2021	BUF	2	2	7	**98**	**14.0**	**38**	**2**	—	—	—	—	—	0	0
2022	BUF	2	2	8	85	10.6	32	1	—	—	—	—	—	0	0
2023	BUF	2	2	2	13	6.5	9	1	—	—	—	—	—	0	0
2024	BUF	3	3	4	45	11.3	25	0	—	—	—	—	—	0	0
2025	BUF	2	2	6	62	10.3	24	0	—	—	—	—	—	0	0
Career		15	12	38	382	10.1	38	6	—	—	—	—	—	0	0

=== Buffalo Bills franchise records ===
- Most touchdown receptions by a tight end, season: 9
- Most touchdown receptions by a tight end, career: 26

== Personal life ==
Knox is a Christian. Knox has partnered with P.U.N.T. Pediatric Cancer Collaborative, an organization founded by former Bills punter Brian Moorman, to support the organization through various initiatives.

Knox's younger brother, Luke, played linebacker for the Ole Miss Rebels and was set to play the 2022 season for the Florida International University Panthers as a graduate transfer. Luke Knox died August 17, 2022, following a sudden hospitalization.

On November 30, 2023, Knox became engaged to personal trainer Alex Seefeldt. He announced the engagement via Instagram on December 3. They married in July 2024. His wife gave birth to a daughter in December 2025, and Knox honored her birth with a touchdown celebration against the Patriots in week 15 of that season.

Knox made a guest cameo as himself in the 2025 Hallmark Channel original film, Holiday Touchdown: A Bills Love Story.
