= Tanner Owen =

American football player (born 1996)

Profile
- Position: Offensive tackle

Personal information
- Born: September 16, 1996 (age 30); Kearney, Missouri
- Listed height: 6 ft 5 in (1.96 m)
- Listed weight: 292 lb (132 kg)

Career information
- High school: Kearney (MO)
- College: Missouri (2015–2017); Northwest Missouri State (2018–2021)
- NFL draft: 2022: undrafted

Career history
- Buffalo Bills (2022)*; New Orleans Saints (2022)*
- * Offseason or practice squad member only
- Stats at Pro Football Reference

Tanner Owen (born September 16, 1996) is an American football offensive tackle. He played college football at Missouri and Northwest Missouri State.

== Professional career ==
=== Buffalo Bills ===
Owen signed with the Buffalo Bills as an undrafted free agent on April 30, 2022, following the 2022 NFL draft. He was waived as part of the team's final roster cuts on August 28, 2022.

=== New Orleans Saints ===
On August 29, 2022, Owen was claimed off waivers by the New Orleans Saints and made the team's final roster. He was waived on September 8, 2022, and re-signed to the practice squad. He was released on September 12.
