= Siran Neal =

American football player (born 1994)

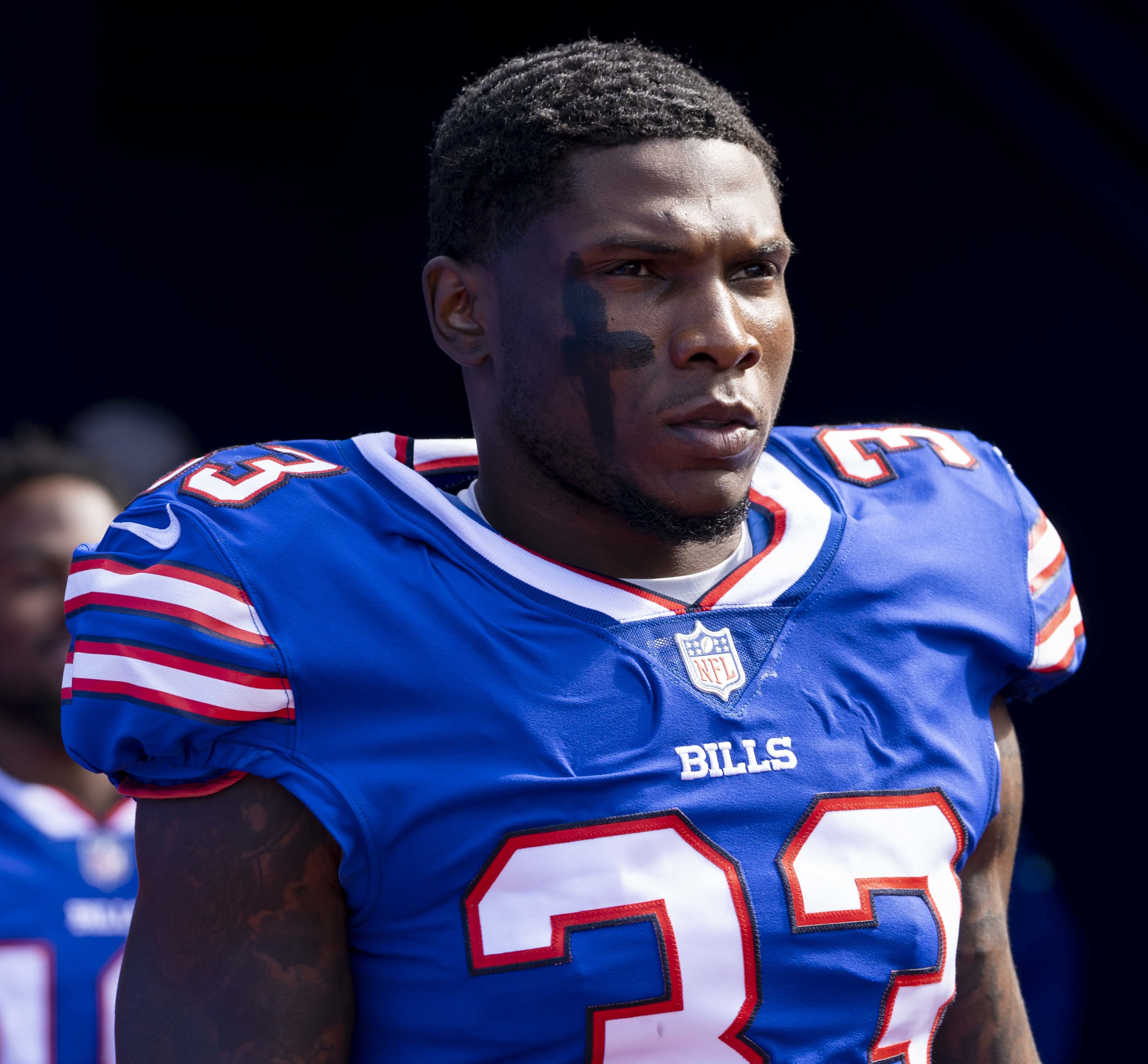
- Neal with the Buffalo Bills in 2021

No. 33 – San Francisco 49ers
- Positions: Safety, special teamer
- Roster status: Active

Personal information
- Born: August 4, 1994 (age 32); Dothan, Alabama, U.S.
- Listed height: 6 ft 0 in (1.83 m)
- Listed weight: 206 lb (93 kg)

Career information
- High school: Eufaula (Eufaula, Alabama)
- College: Jacksonville State (2013–2017)
- NFL draft: 2018: 5th round, 154th overall pick

Career history
- Buffalo Bills (2018–2023); Miami Dolphins (2024); San Francisco 49ers (2025–present)

Awards and highlights
- 2x First-team All-OVC (2016, 2017)

Career NFL statistics as of 2025
- Total tackles: 143
- Sacks: 1.0
- Forced fumbles: 3
- Fumble recoveries: 2
- Pass deflections: 7
- Stats at Pro Football Reference

Siran De'Vonte' Neal (born August 4, 1994) is an American professional football defensive back and special teamer for the San Francisco 49ers of the National Football League (NFL). He played college football for the Jacksonville State Gamecocks and was selected by the Buffalo Bills in the fifth round of the 2018 NFL draft. Neal has played safety, nickelback, and cornerback throughout his career, but his primary contributions have been as a core special teams player.

== Early life ==
Neal attended Abbeville High School in Abbeville, Alabama, where he played football. He was an All-State wide receiver for the team in 2011, when he caught 54 passes and 13 touchdowns. Neal played his senior season at Eufaula High School in Eufaula, Alabama. He was a first team All-State selection in 2012 after recording 22 receptions for 377 yards and eight touchdowns.

== College career ==
Neal attended and played college football at Jacksonville State and graduated with a degree in criminal justice. He was a two-time all-Ohio Valley Conference selection in 2016 and 2017, the first year as a linebacker, the second as a safety. In 2016, Neal recorded 80 tackles and an interception as a linebacker. Switching to safety in 2017, he had 33 tackles and had a team-high 11 pass breakups.

== Professional career ==
Pre-draft measurables
Height	Weight	Arm length	Hand span	Wingspan	40-yard dash	10-yard split	20-yard split	20-yard shuttle	Three-cone drill	Vertical jump	Broad jump	Bench press
6 ft 0 in (1.83 m)	206 lb (93 kg)	31 1/8 in (0.79 m)	9 7/8 in (0.25 m)	6 ft 3 5/8 in (1.92 m)	4.56 s	1.62 s	2.62 s	4.28 s	7.00 s	40.5 in (1.03 m)	10 ft 2 in (3.10 m)	17 reps
All values from NFL Combine/Pro Day

=== Buffalo Bills ===
Neal was selected by the Buffalo Bills in the fifth round (154th overall) of the 2018 NFL draft. He made his NFL debut in the Bills' season opener against the Baltimore Ravens. Three weeks later against the Green Bay Packers, Neal recorded his first professional sack.

Neal was placed on the reserve/COVID-19 list by the Bills on July 30, 2020, and was activated six days later.

On February 23, 2022, Neal signed a three-year contract extension with the Bills.

On March 6, 2024, Neal was released by the Bills.

=== Miami Dolphins ===
On March 13, 2024, Neal signed with the Miami Dolphins.

=== San Francisco 49ers ===
On March 18, 2025, Neal signed a two-year contract with the San Francisco 49ers.

== Career statistics ==
=== NFL ===
Legend
**Bold**	Career high

==== Regular season ====
Year	Team	Games		Tackles					Interceptions						Fumbles				
Year	Team	GP	GS	Cmb	Solo	Ast	Sck	TFL	Int	Yds	Avg	Lng	TD	PD	FF	Fum	FR	Yds	TD
2018	BUF	16	0	11	10	1	**1.0**	**2**	0	0	0.0	0	0	0	**1**	0	**1**	0	0
2019	BUF	15	**1**	**36**	**28**	8	0.0	**2**	0	0	0.0	0	0	0	**1**	0	0	0	0
2020	BUF	16	0	13	9	4	0.0	0	0	0	0.0	0	0	1	0	0	0	0	0
2021	BUF	**17**	0	23	16	7	0.0	0	0	0	0.0	0	0	0	**1**	0	**1**	0	0
2022	BUF	16	0	19	13	6	0.0	0	0	0	0.0	0	0	**4**	0	0	0	0	0
2023	BUF	**17**	0	13	9	4	0.0	0	0	0	0.0	0	0	0	0	0	0	0	0
2024	MIA	**17**	0	11	9	2	0.0	0	0	0	0.0	0	0	2	0	0	0	0	0
2025	SF	**17**	0	17	6	**11**	0.0	0	0	0	0.0	0	0	0	0	0	0	0	0
Career		131	1	143	100	43	1.0	4	0	0	0.0	0	0	7	3	0	2	0	0

==== Postseason ====
Year	Team	Games		Tackles					Interceptions						Fumbles				
Year	Team	GP	GS	Cmb	Solo	Ast	Sck	TFL	Int	Yds	Avg	Lng	TD	PD	FF	Fum	FR	Yds	TD
2019	BUF	1	0	**4**	**3**	**1**	**1.0**	**1**	0	0	0.0	0	0	**1**	0	0	0	0	0
2020	BUF	**3**	0	1	1	0	0.0	0	0	0	0.0	0	0	0	0	0	0	0	0
2021	BUF	2	0	3	2	**1**	0.0	0	0	0	0.0	0	0	0	0	0	0	0	0
2022	BUF	2	0	2	1	**1**	0.0	0	0	0	0.0	0	0	0	0	0	0	0	0
2023	BUF	2	0	0	0	0	0.0	0	0	0	0.0	0	0	0	0	0	0	0	0
2025	SF	2	0	1	1	0	0.0	0	0	0	0.0	0	0	0	0	0	0	0	0
Career		12	0	11	8	3	1.0	1	0	0	0.0	0	0	1	0	0	0	0	0

=== College ===
SEASON	SCHOOL	TOT	SOLO	AST	PD	SACK	FF	INT
2014–15	Jacksonville State	32	23	9	3	0	0	0
2015–16	Jacksonville State	40	24	16	4	0	0	1
2016–17	Jacksonville State	80	39	41	5	0.5	0	1
2017–18	Jacksonville State	39	26	13	12	0	0	1

== Personal life ==
Neal is the son of Glenn Neal and Rhonda Walker. He has six brothers and one sister. Neal is married to his long-term girlfriend and shares twin daughters, Londyn and Lauryn Neal, as well as a son.
