= 2025 Buffalo Bills season =

American football team season

- Logo commemorating the Bills' final season at Highmark Stadium
- Owner: Terry and Kim Pegula
- General manager: Brandon Beane
- Head coach: Sean McDermott
- Offensive coordinator: Joe Brady
- Defensive coordinator: Bobby Babich
- Home stadium: Highmark Stadium

Results
- Record: 12–5
- Division place: 2nd AFC East
- Playoffs: Won Wild Card Playoffs (at Jaguars) 27–24; Lost Divisional Playoffs (at Broncos) 30–33 (OT)
- All-Pros: KR Ray Davis (1st team); RB James Cook (2nd team)
- Pro Bowlers: QB Josh Allen; RB James Cook; OT Dion Dawkins; TE Dalton Kincaid

Uniform
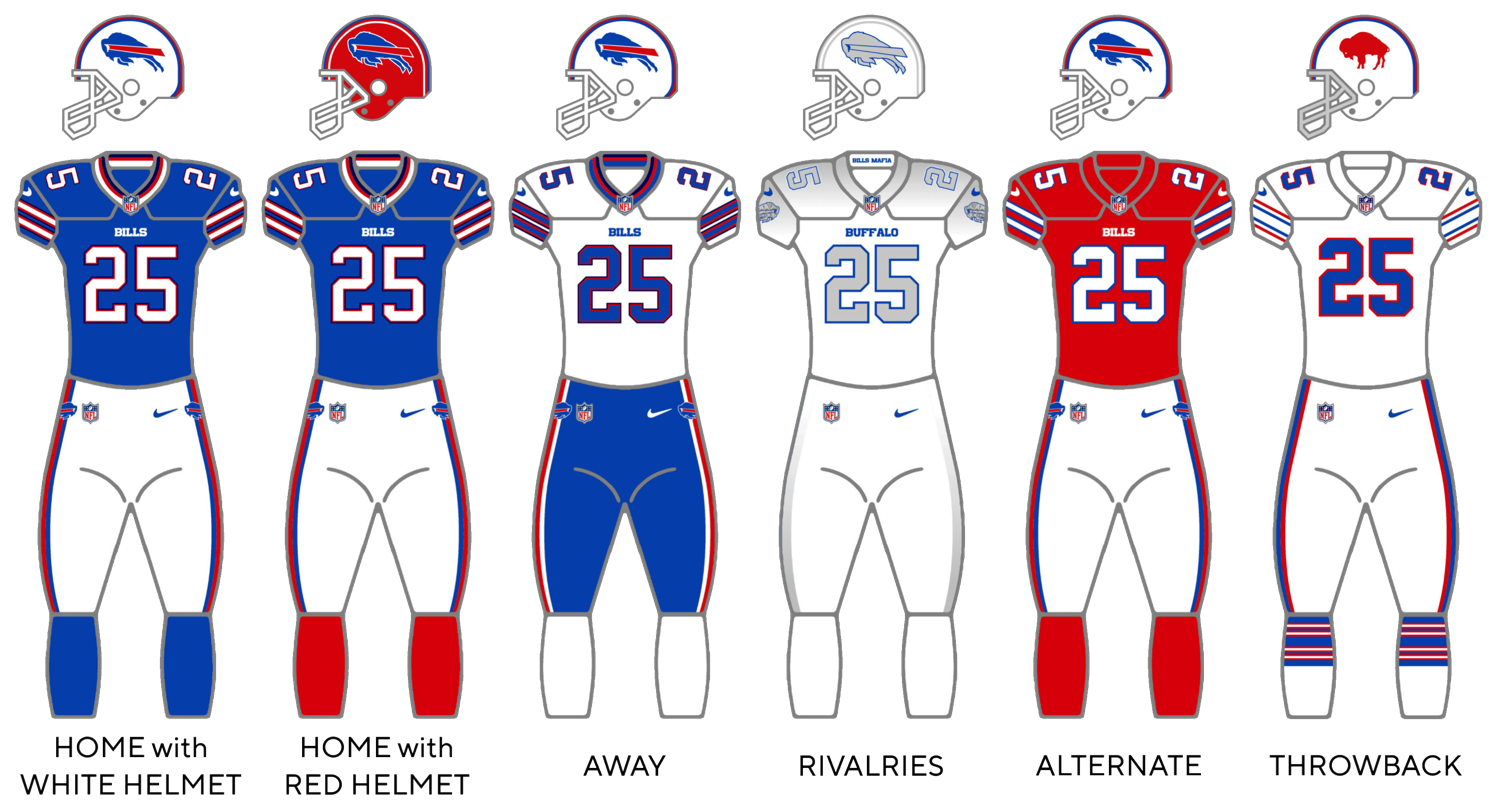

The 2025 season was the Buffalo Bills' 56th in the National Football League (NFL), their 66th overall, their eleventh full season under the ownership of Terry and Kim Pegula, their ninth under general manager Brandon Beane, and their ninth and final under head coach Sean McDermott. The Bills started the season 4–0, but became the last undefeated team in the NFL to lose after a Week 5 loss to their division rival, the New England Patriots. It was the first time that no team reached 5–0 since 2014.

Despite the strong regular season record, the Bills faced some struggles throughout the season. This included failing to match their 13 wins from 2024 following a Week 12 loss to the Houston Texans. In addition to this, they failed to win the AFC East for the first time since 2019 after a Week 17 loss to the Philadelphia Eagles. Nonetheless, the Bills qualified for the playoffs for the seventh consecutive season after the Indianapolis Colts lost in Week 16. With the Kansas City Chiefs failing to qualify, the Bills now hold the longest active playoff appearance streak in the NFL, appearing in every postseason since 2019. In addition to this, running back James Cook lead the league in rushing yards for the season, with 1,621 total rushing yards, becoming the first Bills player to achieve this since O.J. Simpson in 1976.

It was the Bills' final season playing their home games at their current Highmark Stadium, as their New Highmark Stadium opened for the 2026 season. For the first time since 2016, safety Micah Hyde was not on the roster, as he announced his retirement on January 27. The team drew an average home attendance of 70,877 in 9 home games of the 2025 NFL season, a 1% increase from the previous year.

The Bills entered the playoffs as the #6-seed, and beat the #3-seed Jacksonville Jaguars by a score of 27–24 in the Wild Card Playoffs. This would be their first road playoff victory since 1992. However, their season ended in heartbreak once again, as they were defeated by the top-seeded Denver Broncos by a final score of 33–30 in overtime in the Divisional round of the playoffs - their fourth Divisional Round exit in five seasons.

== Transactions ==
=== Arrivals ===
Position	Player	2024 team(s)	Date signed
P	Jake Camarda	Tampa Bay Buccaneers	January 7, 2025
TE	Armani Rogers	Philadelphia Eagles; Atlanta Falcons	January 17, 2025
WR	Josh Palmer	Los Angeles Chargers	March 10, 2025
DE	Michael Hoecht	Los Angeles Rams	March 11, 2025
DE	Joey Bosa	Los Angeles Chargers	March 11, 2025
DT	Larry Ogunjobi	Pittsburgh Steelers	March 12, 2025
S	Darrick Forrest	Washington Commanders	March 12, 2025
WR	Laviska Shenault	Seattle Seahawks; Los Angeles Chargers	March 13, 2025
CB	Dane Jackson	Carolina Panthers	March 14, 2025
G	Kendrick Green	Houston Texans	March 14, 2025
P	Brad Robbins	Cincinnati Bengals	March 31, 2025
CB	Tre'Davious White	Los Angeles Rams; Baltimore Ravens	April 17, 2025
WR	Elijah Moore	Cleveland Browns	April 30, 2025
DT	Casey Rogers	New York Giants	May 9, 2025
WR	Kristian Wilkerson	Las Vegas Raiders	May 20, 2025
DT	Marcus Harris	Houston Texans; New England Patriots	June 6, 2025
LB	Shaq Thompson	Carolina Panthers	June 10, 2025
TE	Matt Sokol	Pittsburgh Steelers	July 22, 2025
LB	Jimmy Ciarlo	New York Jets	August 6, 2025
S	Jordan Poyer	Miami Dolphins	August 27, 2025
S	Sam Franklin Jr.	Carolina Panthers	August 27, 2025
DE	Andre Jones Jr.	Washington Commanders	August 28, 2025
WR	Gabe Davis	Jacksonville Jaguars	September 2, 2025
K	Matt Prater	Arizona Cardinals	September 9, 2025
P	Cameron Johnston	Pittsburgh Steelers	September 9, 2025
DT	Phidarian Mathis	Washington Commanders; New York Jets	September 10, 2025
P	Mitch Wishnowsky	Washington Commanders (2025)	September 30, 2025
WR	Mecole Hardman	Green Bay Packers (2025)	November 11, 2025
DE	Morgan Fox	Los Angeles Chargers	November 12, 2025
DE	Shaq Lawson	Carolina Panthers	November 25, 2025
WR	Brandin Cooks	New Orleans Saints (2025)	November 25, 2025
S	Darnell Savage	Washington Commanders (2025)	December 5, 2025
K	Michael Badgley	Indianapolis Colts (2025)	December 16, 2025
DE	Matthew Judon	Miami Dolphins (2025)	December 20, 2025

=== Departures ===
Position	Player	2025 team	Date signed	Notes
DT	Eli Ankou	—	Free Agent	Contracts expired January 26, 2025
C	Will Clapp	New Orleans Saints	March 13, 2025	Contracts expired January 26, 2025
FS	Micah Hyde	—	Retired	Contracts expired January 26, 2025
SS	Kareem Jackson	—	Free Agent	Contracts expired January 26, 2025
DE	Kingsley Jonathan	Houston Texans	February 7, 2025	Contracts expired January 26, 2025
LB	Tyreek Maddox-Williams	—	Free Agent	Contracts expired January 26, 2025
DE	Casey Toohill	Houston Texans	March 13, 2025	Contracts expired January 26, 2025
OT	Tommy Doyle	—	Retired	
P	Sam Martin	Carolina Panthers	March 11, 2025	Released March 6, 2025
LB	Von Miller	Washington Commanders	July 21, 2025	Released March 9, 2025
WR	Amari Cooper	—	Retired	Contracts expired March 12, 2025
CB	Rasul Douglas	Miami Dolphins	August 26, 2025	Contracts expired March 12, 2025
WR	Mack Hollins	New England Patriots	March 10, 2025	Contracts expired March 12, 2025
DT	Quinton Jefferson	Detroit Lions	September 24, 2025	Contracts expired March 12, 2025
DT	Austin Johnson	Jacksonville Jaguars	August 4, 2025	Contracts expired March 12, 2025
TE	Quintin Morris	Jacksonville Jaguars	May 14, 2025	Contracts expired March 12, 2025
DE	Dawuane Smoot	Jacksonville Jaguars	June 3, 2025	Contracts expired March 12, 2025

=== Trades ===
Position	Arrived	From	Date of trade	Departed
CB	2025 5th-round pick 2026 7th-round pick	Dallas Cowboys	March 12, 2025	Kaiir Elam; 2025 6th-round pick

=== Draft ===
2025 Buffalo Bills draft selections
Round	Selection	Player	Position	College	Notes
1	30	Maxwell Hairston	CB	Kentucky	
2	41	T. J. Sanders	DT	South Carolina	From Bears (Note: The Bills traded second- (56th and 62nd overall) and fourth- (109th overall) round selections to the Chicago Bears in exchange for second- (41st overall), third- (72nd overall) and seventh- (240th overall) round selections.)
2	56	Traded to the Chicago Bears			From Vikings via Texans (Note: The Bills traded fifth- (166th overall) and 2024 sixth-round selections and WR Stefon Diggs to the Houston Texans in exchange for a second-round selection (56th overall).)
2	62	Traded to the Chicago Bears			
3	72	Landon Jackson	DE	Arkansas	From Bears
3	94	Traded to the Cleveland Browns (Note: The Bills traded third- (94th overall) and 2026 seventh-round selections to the Cleveland Browns in exchange for a sixth-round selection (204th overall) and WR Amari Cooper.)			
4	109	Deone Walker	DT	Kentucky	From (Note: The Bills traded a 2024 fifth-round selection to the Chicago Bears in exchange for a fourth-round selection (109th overall).) To From (Note: The Bills traded fourth- (132nd overall) and fifth- (169th overall) round selections to the Chicago Bears in exchange for a fourth-round selection (109th overall).) Bears
4	132	Traded to the Chicago Bears			
5	166	Traded to the Houston Texans			
5	169	Traded to the Chicago Bears			Compensatory selection
5	170	Jordan Hancock	CB	Ohio State	Compensatory selection; from Cowboys (Note: The Bills traded a sixth-round selection (204th overall) and CB Kaiir Elam to the Dallas Cowboys in exchange for fifth- (170th overall) and 2026 seventh-round selections.)
5	173	Jackson Hawes	TE	Georgia Tech	Compensatory selection
6	177	Dorian Strong	CB	Virginia Tech	From Giants (Note: The Bills traded a seventh-round selection (246th overall) and LB Carlos Basham Jr. to the New York Giants in exchange for a sixth-round selection (177th overall).)
6	204	Traded to the Dallas Cowboys			From Browns
6	206	Chase Lundt	OT	UConn	
7	240	Kaden Prather	WR	Maryland	From Bears
7	246	Traded to the New York Giants			

Draft trades

Notes

- The Bills received two fifth-round compensatory selections (169th and 173rd overall) for WR Gabe Davis signing with the Jacksonville Jaguars and DE Leonard Floyd signing with the San Francisco 49ers last offseason.

2025 Buffalo Bills undrafted free agents
Name	Position	College	Ref.
Kelly Akharaiyi	WR	Mississippi State	
Stephen Gosnell	WR	Virginia Tech	
Hal Presley	WR	Baylor	
Keleki Latu	TE	Washington	
Jacob Bayer	C	Arkansas State	
Rush Reimer	G	California	
Wande Owens	S	New Hampshire	
Daryl Porter Jr.	CB	Miami (FL)	
Keonta Jenkins	LB	Virginia Tech	
Paris Shand	DE	LSU	
Hayden Harris	DE	Montana	
Devin Brandt-Epps	DT	New Mexico	

== Staff ==
2025 Buffalo Bills staff
Front office: Owner/CEO/president – Terry Pegula; Owner – Kim Pegula; General manager – Brandon Beane; Assistant general manager – Brian Gaine; Assistant general manager – Terrance Gray; Senior advisor to the GM/football operations – Jim Overdorf; Senior personnel advisor – Malik Boyd; Co-director of pro scouting – Chris Marrow; Co-director of pro scouting – Curtis Rukavina; Assistant director of pro scouting – Asil Mulbah; Vice president of football administration – Kevin Meganck; Director of football operations – Brendan Rowe; Director of college scouting – Matt Bazirgan; Vice president of football research - Dennis Lock; Head coaches: Head coach – Sean McDermott; Offensive coaches: Offensive coordinator – Joe Brady; Quarterbacks – Ronald Curry; Running backs – Kelly Skipper; Wide receivers – Adam Henry; Offensive quality control/assistant wide receivers – DJ Mangas; Tight ends – Rob Boras; Offensive line – Aaron Kromer; Assistant offensive line – Austin Gund; Passing game specialist/game management – Marc Lubick; Offensive quality control – Kyle Shurmur	Defensive coaches: Defensive coordinator – Bobby Babich; Defensive line – Marcus West; Assistant defensive line – Jason Rebrovich; Linebackers – Al Holcomb; Cornerbacks – Jahmile Addae; Nickel – Mike Pellegrino; Safeties – Joe Danna; Senior defensive assistant – Ryan Nielsen; Special teams coaches: Special teams coordinator – Chris Tabor; Assistant special teams – Turner West; Director of team administration – Matt Worswick; Strength and conditioning: Head strength and conditioning – Will Greenberg; Senior strength and conditioning assistant - Barry Rubin; Assistant strength & conditioning – Hal Luther; Assistant strength & conditioning - Nick Lacy; Assistant strength & conditioning - Jason Oszvart

== Final roster ==
2025 Buffalo Bills roster
Quarterbacks (QB): 17 Josh Allen; 11 Mitchell Trubisky; Running backs (RB): 4 James Cook; 22 Ray Davis; 41 Reggie Gilliam; 26 Ty Johnson; Wide receivers (WR): 0 Keon Coleman; 18 Brandin Cooks; 1 Curtis Samuel; 10 Khalil Shakir; Tight ends (TE): 85 Jackson Hawes; 86 Dalton Kincaid; 88 Dawson Knox; 83 Keleki Latu	Offensive linemen (OL): 70 Alec Anderson G/T; 79 Spencer Brown T; 73 Dion Dawkins T; 76 David Edwards G; 68 Tylan Grable T; 66 Connor McGovern C; 64 O'Cyrus Torrence G; 74 Ryan Van Demark T; 62 Sedrick Van Pran-Granger C; Defensive linemen (DL): 97 Joey Bosa DE; 57 A. J. Epenesa DE; 92 DaQuan Jones DT; 72 Phidarian Mathis DT; 99 Larry Ogunjobi DT; 91 Ed Oliver DT; 50 Greg Rousseau DE; 98 T. J. Sanders DT; 56 Javon Solomon DE; 96 Deone Walker DT	Linebackers (LB): 44 Joe Andreessen MLB; 8 Terrel Bernard MLB; 58 Matt Milano OLB; 54 Baylon Spector OLB; 45 Shaq Thompson OLB/MLB; 42 Dorian Williams OLB; Defensive backs (DB): 47 Christian Benford CB; 24 Cole Bishop S; 28 Sam Franklin Jr. S; 31 Maxwell Hairston CB; 37 Jordan Hancock S; 23 Dane Jackson CB; 7 Taron Johnson CB; 39 Cam Lewis CB/S; 21 Jordan Poyer S; 25 Darnell Savage S; 27 Tre'Davious White CB; Special teams (ST): 69 Reid Ferguson LS; 15 Matt Prater K; 19 Mitch Wishnowsky P	Practice squad: 71 Tommy Akingbesote DT; 6 Shane Buechele QB; 67 Travis Clayton T (IPP); 29 Brandon Codrington CB; 33 Te'Cory Couch CB; 36 MJ Devonshire CB; 20 Frank Gore Jr. RB; 89 Stephen Gosnell WR; 16 Mecole Hardman WR; 49 Keonta Jenkins OLB; 75 Andre Jones Jr. DE; 36 Matthew Judon DE; 51 Shaq Lawson DE; 93 Zion Logue DT; 46 Daryl Porter Jr. CB; 82 Kristian Wilkerson WR; 40 Matthew Wright K; Reserve: 2 Tyler Bass K (IR); -- Nick Broeker T (Futures); 90 DeWayne Carter DT (IR); 13 Gabe Davis WR (IR); 3 Damar Hamlin S (IR/DFR); 55 Michael Hoecht DE (IR); 94 Landon Jackson DE (IR); 77 Chase Lundt T (IR); 30 Wande Owens S (IR); 5 Josh Palmer WR (IR); 52 Jordan Phillips DT (IR); 9 Taylor Rapp S (IR); 14 Tyrell Shavers WR (IR); -- Darius Slay CB (DNR); 43 Dorian Strong CB (IR); -- Maddux Trujillo K (Futures); Rookies in italics 53 active, 16 reserve, 16 practice squad (1 exempt)

== Preseason ==
The Bills' training camp and preseason were featured on the HBO documentary series Hard Knocks.

Week	Date	Opponent	Result	Record	Venue	Recap
1	August 9	New York Giants	L 25–34	0–1	Highmark Stadium	Recap
2	August 17	at Chicago Bears	L 0–38	0–2	Soldier Field	Recap
3	August 23	at Tampa Bay Buccaneers	W 23–19	1–2	Raymond James Stadium	Recap

== Regular season ==
=== Schedule ===
Week	Date	Opponent	Result	Record	Venue	Recap
1	September 7	Baltimore Ravens	**W** 41–40	1–0	Highmark Stadium	Recap
2	September 14	at **New York Jets**	**W** 30–10	2–0	MetLife Stadium	Recap
3	September 18	**Miami Dolphins**	**W** 31–21	3–0	Highmark Stadium	Recap
4	September 28	New Orleans Saints	**W** 31–19	4–0	Highmark Stadium	Recap
5	October 5	**New England Patriots**	**L** 20–23	4–1	Highmark Stadium	Recap
6	October 13	at Atlanta Falcons	**L** 14–24	4–2	Mercedes-Benz Stadium	Recap
7	Bye					
8	October 26	at Carolina Panthers	**W** 40–9	5–2	Bank of America Stadium	Recap
9	November 2	Kansas City Chiefs	**W** 28–21	6–2	Highmark Stadium	Recap
10	November 9	at **Miami Dolphins**	**L** 13–30	6–3	Hard Rock Stadium	Recap
11	November 16	Tampa Bay Buccaneers	**W** 44–32	7–3	Highmark Stadium	Recap
12	November 20	at Houston Texans	**L** 19–23	7–4	NRG Stadium	Recap
13	November 30	at Pittsburgh Steelers	**W** 26–7	8–4	Acrisure Stadium	Recap
14	December 7	Cincinnati Bengals	**W** 39–34	9–4	Highmark Stadium	Recap
15	December 14	at **New England Patriots**	**W** 35–31	10–4	Gillette Stadium	Recap
16	December 21	at Cleveland Browns	**W** 23–20	11–4	Huntington Bank Field	Recap
17	December 28	Philadelphia Eagles	**L** 12–13	11–5	Highmark Stadium	Recap
18	January 4	**New York Jets**	**W** 35–8	12–5	Highmark Stadium	Recap

Note: Intra-division opponents are in bold text.

=== Game summaries ===
==== Week 1: vs. Baltimore Ravens ====
Week 1: Baltimore Ravens at Buffalo Bills – Game summary

Quarter	1	2	3	4	Total
Ravens	3	17	14	6	**40**
**Bills**	7	6	6	22	**41**

at Highmark Stadium, Orchard Park, New York

- Date: September 7
- Game time: 8:20 p.m. EDT
- Game weather: Partly cloudy, 58 °F (14 °C)
- Game attendance: 70,745
- Referee: John Hussey
- TV announcers (NBC): Mike Tirico, Cris Collinsworth and Melissa Stark
- Recap, Game Book

Game information

**First quarter**

- BUF – Dalton Kincaid 15-yard pass from Josh Allen (Matt Prater kick), 11:19. Bills 7–0. **Drive: 7 plays, 50 yards, 3:41.**
- BAL – Tyler Loop 52-yard field goal, 3:38. Bills 7–3. **Drive: 12 plays, 35 yards, 7:41.**

**Second quarter**

- BAL – Derrick Henry 30-yard rush (Tyler Loop kick), 13:35. Ravens 10–7. **Drive: 6 plays, 85 yards, 3:04.**
- BAL – Lamar Jackson 10-yard rush (Tyler Loop kick), 9:47. Ravens 17–7. **Drive: 4 plays, 69 yards, 2:16.**
- BUF – Matt Prater 25-yard field goal, 2:50. Ravens 17–10. **Drive: 13 plays, 63 yards, 6:57.**
- BAL – Tyler Loop 49-yard field goal, 0:31. Ravens 20–10. **Drive: 8 plays, 23 yards, 2:19.**
- BUF – Matt Prater 43-yard field goal, 0:00. Ravens 20–13. **Drive: 4 plays, 48 yards, 0:31.**

**Third quarter**

- BAL – Zay Flowers 23-yard pass from Lamar Jackson (Tyler Loop kick), 12:48. Ravens 27–13. **Drive: 4 plays, 65 yards, 2:12.**
- BUF – James Cook 2-yard rush (pass failed), 7:47. Ravens 27–19. **Drive: 9 plays, 60 yards, 5:01.**
- BAL – DeAndre Hopkins 29-yard pass from Lamar Jackson (Tyler Loop kick), 1:09. Ravens 34–19. **Drive: 3 plays, 68 yards, 1:33.**

**Fourth quarter**

- BUF – Josh Allen 2-yard rush (pass failed), 12:51. Ravens 34–25. **Drive: 8 plays, 84 yards, 3:18.**
- BAL – Derrick Henry 46-yard rush (kick wide right), 11:42. Ravens 40–25. **Drive: 4 plays, 65 yards, 1:09.**
- BUF – Keon Coleman 10-yard pass from Josh Allen (Matt Prater kick), 3:56. Ravens 40–32. **Drive: 10 plays, 80 yards, 3:20.**
- BUF – Josh Allen 1-yard rush (pass failed), 1:58. Ravens 40–38. **Drive: 4 plays, 30 yards, 1:08.**
- BUF – Matt Prater 32-yard field goal, 0:00. Bills 41–40. **Drive: 9 plays, 66 yards, 1:26.**

**Top passers**

- BAL – Lamar Jackson – 14/19, 209 yards, 2 TD
- BUF – Josh Allen – 33/46, 394 yards, 2 TD

**Top rushers**

- BAL – Derrick Henry – 18 rushes, 169 yards, 2 TD
- BUF – James Cook – 13 rushes, 44 yards, TD

**Top receivers**

- BAL – Zay Flowers – 7 receptions, 143 yards, TD
- BUF – Keon Coleman – 8 receptions, 112 yards, TD

Beginning their final season in Highmark Stadium, the Bills started the game strong, charging down the field and ending the drive with a passing touchdown from Josh Allen to Dalton Kincaid. The defense also started off strong, only allowing the Ravens a field goal by Tyler Loop to start the game off 7–3. However, things would begin to take a turn when the Ravens answered back as Derrick Henry and Lamar Jackson scored rushing touchdowns in quick succession. The half would end with three consecutive field goals, two for the Bills by Matt Prater filling in for Tyler Bass, and one for the Ravens.

Going into the second half at 13–20, the game turned into an offensive shootout. For the Ravens, Jackson would throw two touchdown passes to Zay Flowers and DeAndre Hopkins respectively, while Henry rushed for another touchdown that put the Bills down 25–40. For the Bills, James Cook and Allen each scored rushing touchdowns, both scores having failed two-point conversion attempts to follow. In addition, Allen threw a touchdown pass to Keon Coleman that was deflected off the hands of another receiver. With just under four minutes of the game left and the Ravens with the ball, Ed Oliver forced Henry to fumble, setting up another Allen rushing touchdown to cut the deficit to 38–40, with the Bills failing to get the two-point conversion once again. The Bills' defense forced another 3-and-out for Baltimore, and after receiving the punt, the offense charged downfield one last time with two decisive passes from Allen to Josh Palmer and Coleman, respectively, setting up a game-winning 32-yard field goal to defeat Baltimore 41–40.

The Bills' win was their first when trailing by 15 points or more in the fourth quarter since 1967, as they scored their final 16 unanswered points in the final four minutes of the game. They would begin the season with a 1–0 record and continue their home-field winning streak at 11 games. Allen also broke the record for most rushing touchdowns in Buffalo Bills franchise history, at a total of 67 and counting. This surpasses Thurman Thomas's record of 65.

==== Week 2: at New York Jets ====
Week 2: Buffalo Bills at New York Jets – Game summary

Quarter	1	2	3	4	Total
**Bills**	10	10	3	7	**30**
Jets	0	3	0	7	**10**

at MetLife Stadium, East Rutherford, New Jersey

- Date: September 14
- Game time: 1:00 p.m. EDT
- Game weather: Sunny, 80 °F (27 °C)
- Game attendance: 80,875
- Referee: Clete Blakeman
- TV announcers (CBS): Jim Nantz, Tony Romo and Tracy Wolfson
- Recap, Game Book

Game information

**First quarter**

- BUF – James Cook 1-yard run (Matt Prater kick), 7:29. Bills 7–0. **Drive: 12 plays, 81 yards, 5:58.**
- BUF – Matt Prater 28-yard field goal, 5:01. Bills 10–0. **Drive: 6 plays, 14 yards, 2:13.**

**Second quarter**

- BUF – Matt Prater 52-yard field goal, 14:02. Bills 13–0. **Drive: 9 plays, 46 yards, 3:31.**
- BUF – James Cook 44-yard run (Matt Prater kick), 8:50. Bills 20–0. **Drive: 5 plays, 73 yards, 2:55.**
- NYJ – Nick Folk 51-yard field goal, 4:21. Bills 20–3. **Drive: 7 plays, 31 yards, 4:29.**

**Third quarter**

- BUF – Matt Prater 33-yard field goal, 9:01. Bills 23–3. **Drive: 11 plays, 64 yards, 5:59.**

**Fourth quarter**

- BUF – Elijah Moore 4-yard run (Matt Prater kick), 14:57. Bills 30–3. **Drive: 12 plays, 79 yards, 6:59.**
- NYJ – Jeremy Ruckert 5-yard pass from Tyrod Taylor (Nick Folk kick), 3:28. Bills 30–10. **Drive: 10 plays, 54 yards, 3:07.**

**Top passers**

- BUF – Josh Allen – 14/25, 148 yards
- NYJ – Tyrod Taylor – 7/11, 56 yards, TD

**Top rushers**

- BUF – James Cook – 21 rushes, 132 yards, 2 TD
- NYJ – Justin Fields – 5 rushes, 49 yards

**Top receivers**

- BUF – Josh Palmer – 2 receptions, 47 yards
- NYJ – Garrett Wilson – 4 receptions, 50 yards

After a down-to-the-wire win in Week 1, the Bills dominated the Jets in their first divisional game of the season, thanks to a strong rushing attack led by James Cook and a blitz-heavy defensive game plan, despite key defensive starters Ed Oliver and Taron Johnson missing the game due to injury. Notably, veteran cornerback Tre'Davious White made his first start with the Bills since 2023, having returned after a season-ending Achilles injury that year and playing the 2024 season on other teams. With a substantial lead in the fourth quarter, the Bills rested several starters as Jets backup quarterback and former Bill Tyrod Taylor threw a touchdown to Jeremy Ruckert in garbage time, filling in for starter Justin Fields, who struggled all game against the Bills' pass rush and left in the fourth quarter to be evaluated for a concussion. With their 30–10 victory, the Bills improved to 2–0.

==== Week 3: vs. Miami Dolphins ====
Week 3: Miami Dolphins at Buffalo Bills – Game summary

Quarter	1	2	3	4	Total
Dolphins	7	7	0	7	**21**
**Bills**	7	7	7	10	**31**

at Highmark Stadium, Orchard Park, New York

- Date: September 18
- Game time: 8:15 p.m. EDT
- Game weather: Partly cloudy, 68 °F (20 °C)
- Game attendance: 70,641
- Referee: Alan Eck
- TV announcers (WKBW/Prime Video): Al Michaels, Kirk Herbstreit and Kaylee Hartung
- Recap, Game Book

Game information

**First quarter**

- MIA – Ollie Gordon II 2-yard rush (Riley Patterson kick), 8:31. Dolphins 7–0. **Drive: 10 plays, 47 yards, 6:29.**
- BUF – Dalton Kincaid 20-yard pass from Josh Allen (Matt Prater kick), 4:04. Tied 7–7. **Drive: 7 plays, 85 yards, 4:27.**

**Second quarter**

- BUF – Jackson Hawes 5-yard pass from Josh Allen (Matt Prater kick), 11:54 Bills 14–7. **Drive: 10 plays, 63 yards, 5:30.**
- MIA – Jaylen Waddle 3-yard pass from Tua Tagovailoa (Riley Patterson kick), 0:08. Tied 14–14. **Drive: 16 plays, 71 yards, 5:55.**

**Third quarter**

- BUF – James Cook 2-yard rush (Matt Prater kick), 10:23. Bills 21–14. **Drive: 8 plays, 61 yards, 4:37.**

**Fourth quarter**

- MIA – Tyreek Hill 5-yard pass from Tua Tagovailoa (Riley Patterson kick), 12:18. Tied 21–21. **Drive: 9 plays, 67 yards, 5:40.**
- BUF – Khalil Shakir 15-yard pass from Josh Allen (Matt Prater kick), 7:17. Bills 28–21. **Drive: 9 plays, 65 yards, 5:01.**
- BUF – Matt Prater 48-yard field goal, 0:22. Bills 31–21. **Drive: 6 plays, 29 yards, 2:38.**

**Top passers**

- MIA – Tua Tagovailoa – 23/25, 161 yards, 2 TD, INT
- BUF – Josh Allen – 22/28, 213 yards, 3 TD

**Top rushers**

- MIA – De'Von Achane – 12 rushes, 62 yards
- BUF – James Cook – 19 rushes, 108 yards, TD

**Top receivers**

- MIA – Tyreek Hill – 5 receptions, 49 yards, TD
- BUF – Dalton Kincaid – 5 receptions, 66 yards, TD

Despite the Bills going into the game as heavy favorites, the Dolphins kept it close for much of the game. In the first quarter, Dolphins running back Ollie Gordon II scored on the opening drive, which would be answered back by the Bills with a touchdown pass from Josh Allen to Dalton Kincaid. The second quarter featured another touchdown pass from Allen to third-string tight end Jackson Hawes. With this pass, Allen earned his 200th regular season passing touchdown and 300th overall touchdown, the latter surpassing a record set by Kansas City Chiefs quarterback Patrick Mahomes for fastest to achieve that milestone. After a missed field goal by Matt Prater, the Dolphins drove down the field and tied the game 14–14 at the half a with a touchdown pass from Tua Tagovailoa to Jaylen Waddle.

During the third quarter, the Bills would start off by marching down the field for a rushing touchdown by James Cook. After several three and outs by both teams, the Dolphins would answer back with a passing touchdown from Tagovailoa to Tyreek Hill. As the Bills were punting the ball back on their following offensive drive, Dolphins defensive tackle Zach Sieler drew a penalty for roughing kicker Cameron Johnston, giving the Bills the ball back and allowing them to score another passing touchdown from Allen to Khalil Shakir. The Dolphins then marched down the field to try and tie the game, but Tagovailoa threw a costly interception to Terrel Bernard, allowing the Bills to seal the game with a field goal by Matt Prater. With their 7th win over the Dolphins, their 12th consecutive win at Highmark Stadium, the Bills improved to 3–0.

==== Week 4: vs. New Orleans Saints ====
Week 4: New Orleans Saints at Buffalo Bills – Game summary

Quarter	1	2	3	4	Total
Saints	7	3	6	3	**19**
**Bills**	14	0	7	10	**31**

at Highmark Stadium, Orchard Park, New York

- Date: September 28
- Game time: 1:00 p.m. EDT
- Game weather: Sunny, 73 °F (23 °C)
- Game attendance: 71,017
- Referee: Land Clark
- TV announcers (CBS): Andrew Catalon, Charles Davis, Jason McCourty and A.J Ross
- Recap, Game Book

Game information

**First quarter**

- BUF – Khalil Shakir 43-yard pass from Josh Allen (Matt Prater kick), 10:49. Bills 7–0. **Drive: 7 plays, 79 yards, 4:11.**
- NO – Kendre Miller 18-yard run (Blake Grupe kick), 6:46. Tied 7–7. **Drive: 7 plays, 69 yards, 4:03.**
- BUF – James Cook 1-yard run (Matt Prater kick), 2:29. Bills 14–7. **Drive: 7 plays, 66 yards, 4:17.**

**Second quarter**

- NO – Blake Grupe 54-yard field goal, 5:31. Bills 14–10. **Drive: 7 plays, 13 yards, 3:12.**

**Third quarter**

- BUF – Josh Allen 5-yard run (Matt Prater kick), 6:42. Bills 21–10. **Drive: 9 plays, 80 yards, 6:09.**
- NO – Chris Olave 3-yard pass from Spencer Rattler (run failed), 0:14. Bills 21–16. **Drive: 11 plays, 65 yards, 6:28.**

**Fourth quarter**

- NO – Blake Grupe 35-yard field goal, 8:53. Bills 21–19. **Drive: 9 plays, 32 yards, 3:59.**
- BUF – Dalton Kincaid 28-yard pass from Josh Allen (Matt Prater kick), 7:07. Bills 28–19. **Drive: 4 plays, 60 yards, 1:46.**
- BUF – Matt Prater 35-yard field goal, 2:09. Bills 31–19. **Drive: 9 plays, 42 yards, 3:27.**

**Top passers**

- NO – Spencer Rattler – 18/27, 126 yards, TD
- BUF – Josh Allen – 16/22, 209 yards, 2 TD, INT

**Top rushers**

- NO – Alvin Kamara – 15 rushes, 70 yards
- BUF – James Cook – 22 rushes, 117 yards, TD

**Top receivers**

- NO – Rashid Shaheed – 4 receptions, 47 yards
- BUF – Khalil Shakir – 5 receptions, 69 yards, TD

Despite New Orleans covering the spread as a 15.5-point underdog and posing a challenge early on, which included forcing Josh Allen to throw his first interception of the year, Buffalo pulled away in the fourth quarter with ten unanswered points after Cameron Johnston drew another roughing the punter penalty, this time on the Saints. With the 31–19 win, the Bills improved to 4–0, becoming the last unbeaten team in the AFC and one of two remaining in the league, alongside the Philadelphia Eagles. The victory also marked the Bills' first home win against the Saints since the 1983 season.

==== Week 5: vs. New England Patriots ====
Week 5: New England Patriots at Buffalo Bills – Game summary

Quarter	1	2	3	4	Total
**Patriots**	3	3	7	10	**23**
Bills	0	3	7	10	**20**

at Highmark Stadium, Orchard Park, New York

- Date: October 5
- Game time: 8:20 p.m. EDT
- Game weather: Clear, 66 °F (19 °C)
- Game attendance: 70,802
- Referee: Shawn Hochuli
- TV announcers (NBC): Mike Tirico, Cris Collinsworth and Melissa Stark
- Recap, Game Book

Game information

**First quarter**

- NE – Andrés Borregales 30-yard field goal, 0:56. Patriots 3–0. **Drive: 4 plays, -1 yard, 0:48.**

**Second quarter**

- BUF – Matt Prater 31-yard field goal, 9:34. Tied 3–3. **Drive: 11 plays, 54 yards, 6:22.**
- NE – Andrés Borregales 19-yard field goal, 0:00. Patriots 6–3. **Drive: 11 plays, 69 yards, 2:22.**

**Third quarter**

- BUF – Curtis Samuel 6-yard pass from Josh Allen (Matt Prater kick), 9:21. Bills 10–6. **Drive: 10 plays, 71 yards, 5:39.**
- NE – Rhamondre Stevenson 4-yard run (Andrés Borregales kick), 6:34. Patriots 13–10. **Drive: 5 plays, 74 yards, 2:47.**

**Fourth quarter**

- NE – Rhamondre Stevenson 7-yard run (Andrés Borregales kick), 12:10. Patriots 20–10. **Drive: 11 plays, 90 yards, 5:43.**
- BUF – Keon Coleman 2-yard pass from Josh Allen (Matt Prater kick), 7:37. Patriots 20–17. **Drive: 8 plays, 74 yards, 4:33.**
- BUF – Matt Prater 45-yard field goal, 2:17. Tied 20–20. **Drive: 10 plays, 53 yards, 3:35.**
- NE – Andrés Borregales 52-yard field goal, 0:15. Patriots 23–20. **Drive: 7 plays, 37 yards, 2:02.**

**Top passers**

- NE – Drake Maye – 22/30, 273 yards
- BUF – Josh Allen – 22/31, 253 yards, 2 TD, INT

**Top rushers**

- NE – TreVeyon Henderson – 6 rushes, 24 yards
- BUF – Josh Allen – 9 rushes, 53 yards

**Top receivers**

- NE – Stefon Diggs – 10 receptions, 146 yards
- BUF – Dalton Kincaid – 6 receptions, 108 yards

The Bills put up a disappointing performance and were upset by the rival New England Patriots and former Bills receiver Stefon Diggs in a turnover-plagued 23–20 loss, their first at home to New England since 2021. They became the final undefeated NFL team to fall after the Philadelphia Eagles fell to the Denver Broncos earlier that afternoon.

With the loss, the Bills saw their 14-game regular-season home winning streak come to an end, along with their 13-game overall home winning streak and they fell to 4–1.

==== Week 6: at Atlanta Falcons ====
Week 6: Buffalo Bills at Atlanta Falcons – Game summary

Quarter	1	2	3	4	Total
Bills	7	0	7	0	**14**
**Falcons**	14	7	0	3	**24**

at Mercedes-Benz Stadium, Atlanta, Georgia

- Date: October 13
- Game time: 7:15 p.m. EDT
- Game weather: Sunny, 75 °F (24 °C) (retractable roof open)
- Game attendance: 72,067
- Referee: Shawn Smith
- TV announcers (ESPN): Chris Fowler, Dan Orlovsky, Louis Riddick, Katie George and Peter Schrager
- Recap, Game Book

Game information

**First quarter**

- ATL – Tyler Allgeier 21-yard run (Parker Romo kick), 12:15. Falcons 7–0. **Drive: 5 plays, 69 yards, 2:45.**
- BUF – Dawson Knox 19-yard pass from Josh Allen (Matt Prater kick), 8:01. Tied 7–7. **Drive: 6 plays, 73 yards, 4:14.**
- ATL – Drake London 9-yard pass from Michael Penix Jr. (Parker Romo kick), 0:26. Falcons 14–7. **Drive: 9 plays, 66 yards, 4:59.**

**Second quarter**

- ATL – Bijan Robinson 81-yard run (Parker Romo kick), 11:09. Falcons 21–7. **Drive: 1 play, 86 yards, 0:42.**

**Third quarter**

- BUF – Ray Davis 16-yard pass from Josh Allen (Matt Prater kick), 9:23. Falcons 21–14. **Drive: 9 plays, 73 yards, 5:37.**

**Fourth quarter**

- ATL – Parker Romo 33-yard field goal, 1:43. Falcons 24–14. **Drive: 14 plays, 68 yards, 5:00.**

**Top passers**

- BUF – Josh Allen – 15/26, 180 yards, 2 TD, 2 INT
- ATL – Michael Penix Jr. – 20/32, 250 yards, TD

**Top rushers**

- BUF – James Cook – 17 rushes, 87 yards
- ATL – Bijan Robinson – 19 rushes, 170 yards, TD

**Top receivers**

- BUF – Josh Palmer – 2 receptions, 60 yards
- ATL – Drake London – 10 receptions, 158 yards, TD

The Bills turned in another disappointing performance, with the defense allowing Falcons running back Bijan Robinson to rush for 170 yards on 19 carries and add six receptions for 68 yards, totaling a career-best 238 yards from scrimmage. Robinson also scored on an 81-yard touchdown run, the longest run of the season so far. Despite the defense holding in the second half, Buffalo's offense struggled, in addition to missing tight end Dalton Kincaid and losing Josh Palmer to a knee injury. The Bills lost to the Falcons 24–14, falling to 4–2 on the year, and to second place in the AFC East.

==== Week 8: at Carolina Panthers ====
Week 8: Buffalo Bills at Carolina Panthers – Game summary

Quarter	1	2	3	4	Total
**Bills**	3	16	21	0	**40**
Panthers	0	3	0	6	**9**

at Bank of America Stadium, Charlotte, North Carolina

- Date: October 26
- Game time: 1:00 p.m. EDT
- Game weather: Mostly cloudy, 63 °F (17 °C)
- Game attendance: 73,505
- Referee: Craig Wrolstad
- TV announcers (Fox): Adam Amin, Greg Olsen and Pam Oliver
- Recap, Game Book

Game information

**First quarter**

- BUF – Matt Prater 45-yard field goal, 7:14. Bills 3–0. **Drive: 11 plays, 49 yards, 5:31.**

**Second quarter**

- BUF – Matt Prater 43-yard field goal, 13:03. Bills 6–0. **Drive: 12 plays, 58 yards, 5:37.**
- CAR – Ryan Fitzgerald 48-yard field goal, 8:58. Bills 6–3. **Drive: 9 plays, 35 yards, 4:05.**
- BUF – James Cook 64-yard run (kick failed), 7:23. Bills 12–3. **Drive: 3 plays, 77 yards, 1:35.**
- BUF – Josh Allen 1-yard run (Matt Prater kick), 1:48. Bills 19–3. **Drive: 1 play, 1 yard, 0:02.**

**Third quarter**

- BUF – Khalil Shakir 54-yard pass from Josh Allen (Matt Prater kick), 12:18. Bills 26–3. **Drive: 4 plays, 65 yards, 2:42.**
- BUF – James Cook 21-yard run (Matt Prater kick), 4:59. Bills 33–3. **Drive: 9 plays, 88 yards, 5:12.**
- BUF – Josh Allen 1-yard run (Matt Prater kick), 1:19. Bills 40–3. **Drive: 6 plays, 19 yards, 3:22.**

**Fourth quarter**

- CAR – Chuba Hubbard 3-yard run (kick failed), 10:33. Bills 40–9. **Drive: 13 plays, 67 yards, 5:46.**

**Top passers**

- BUF – Josh Allen – 12/19, 163 yards, TD
- CAR – Andy Dalton – 16/24, 175 yards, INT

**Top rushers**

- BUF – James Cook – 19 rushes, 216 yards, 2 TD
- CAR – Rico Dowdle – 8 rushes, 54 yards

**Top receivers**

- BUF – Khalil Shakir – 6 receptions, 88 yards, TD
- CAR – Tetairoa McMillan – 7 receptions, 99 yards

After back-to-back losses going into their bye week, the Bills dominated the Panthers with a 216-yard, two-touchdown rushing performance by James Cook and reinforcements on defense. Namely, defensive players Larry Ogunjobi, Michael Hoecht, and Maxwell Hairston made their debuts with the Bills, each helping Buffalo's defense stifle Carolina's rushing attack of Chuba Hubbard and Rico Dowdle, in addition to forcing Panthers backup quarterback Andy Dalton into committing three turnovers. Unfortunately, Ed Oliver suffered another major injury, tearing his bicep tendon which required surgery.

With the 40–9 win, the Bills improved to 5–2, earning their ninth consecutive win after a bye week. In addition to Cook reaching a new career high in rushing yards in a game, Josh Allen broke the NFL record for most games with a passing and rushing touchdown, with 46, surpassing former Panthers quarterback Cam Newton.

==== Week 9: vs. Kansas City Chiefs ====
Week 9: Kansas City Chiefs at Buffalo Bills – Game summary

Quarter	1	2	3	4	Total
Chiefs	0	13	0	8	**21**
**Bills**	7	14	7	0	**28**

at Highmark Stadium, Orchard Park, New York

- Date: November 2
- Game time: 4:25 p.m. EST
- Game weather: Fair, 54 °F (12 °C)
- Game attendance: 71,024
- Referee: Carl Cheffers
- TV announcers (CBS): Jim Nantz, Tony Romo and Tracy Wolfson
- Recap, Game Book

Game information

**First quarter**

- BUF – Dalton Kincaid 23-yard pass from Josh Allen (Matt Prater kick), 8:00. Bills 7–0. **Drive: 11 plays, 84 yards, 7:00.**

**Second quarter**

- KC – Rashee Rice 3-yard run (Harrison Butker kick), 14:56. Tied 7–7. **Drive: 7 plays, 53 yards, 4:21.**
- KC – Harrison Butker 46-yard field goal, 9:27. Chiefs 10–7. **Drive: 7 plays, 36 yards, 3:20.**
- BUF – Ty Johnson 3-yard run (Matt Prater kick), 6:39. Bills 14–10. **Drive: 5 plays, 70 yards, 2:48.**
- BUF – Josh Allen 1-yard run (Matt Prater kick), 1:33. Bills 21–10. **Drive: 7 plays, 60 yards, 2:39.**
- KC – Harrison Butker 19-yard field goal, 0:03. Bills 21–13. **Drive: 7 plays, 66 yards, 1:30.**

**Third quarter**

- BUF – Josh Allen 1-yard run (Matt Prater kick), 1:34. Bills 28–13. **Drive: 8 plays, 74 yards, 3:57.**

**Fourth quarter**

- KC – Kareem Hunt 2-yard run (Patrick Mahomes–Travis Kelce pass), 11:32. Bills 28–21. **Drive: 11 plays, 66 yards, 5:02.**

**Top passers**

- KC – Patrick Mahomes – 15/34, 250 yards, INT
- BUF – Josh Allen – 23/26, 273 yards, TD

**Top rushers**

- KC – Kareem Hunt – 11 rushes, 49 yards, TD
- BUF – James Cook – 27 rushes, 114 yards

**Top receivers**

- KC – Rashee Rice – 4 receptions, 80 yards
- BUF – Dalton Kincaid – 6 receptions, 101 yards, TD

In their sixth consecutive regular-season matchup, the Bills took a 21–13 lead over the Chiefs at halftime, with touchdowns from Dalton Kincaid, Ty Johnson, and Josh Allen. The Chiefs were limited to a Rashee Rice rushing touchdown and two field goals, the latter coming after Buffalo stopped Kansas City at the one-yard line. In the second half, both teams managed just one touchdown apiece as defensive play tightened. Maxwell Hairston intercepted Patrick Mahomes in the fourth quarter while covering Xavier Worthy, setting up the Bills to run out the clock. However, Matt Prater missed a potential game-sealing field goal attempt. With 22 seconds remaining and no timeouts, Mahomes advanced the Chiefs near the Buffalo 40-yard line, but the Bills’ defense held to secure a 28–21 victory, their fifth consecutive regular-season win over Kansas City, improving Buffalo’s record to 6–2.

With his performance, Josh Allen broke multiple records. He set a new franchise mark for completion percentage in a game with at least 15 passing attempts, completing 23 of 26 passes for an 88.5% completion rate. In addition, he surpassed Cam Newton for the most rushing touchdowns by a quarterback in NFL history, including the postseason, with 79. In contrast, Patrick Mahomes was limited by the Bills’ defense to a career-low 44.1% completion rate, completing just 15 of 34 passes.

==== Week 10: at Miami Dolphins ====
Week 10: Buffalo Bills at Miami Dolphins – Game summary

Quarter	1	2	3	4	Total
Bills	0	0	0	13	**13**
**Dolphins**	7	9	0	14	**30**

at Hard Rock Stadium, Miami Gardens, Florida

- Date: November 9
- Game time: 1:00 p.m. EST
- Game weather: Partly cloudy, 84 °F (29 °C)
- Game attendance: 66,030
- Referee: Ron Torbert
- TV announcers (CBS): Andrew Catalon, Charles Davis, Jason McCourty and AJ Ross
- Recap, Game Book

Game information

**First quarter**

- MIA – Malik Washington 9-yard pass from Tua Tagovailoa (Riley Patterson kick), 4:49. Dolphins 7–0. **Drive: 12 plays, 92 yards, 7:27.**

**Second quarter**

- MIA – Jaylen Waddle 38-yard pass from Tua Tagovailoa (kick failed), 14:52. Dolphins 13–0. **Drive: 3 plays, 51 yards, 1:24.**
- MIA – Riley Patterson 46-yard field goal, 3:03. Dolphins 16–0. **Drive: 10 plays, 67 yards, 5:59.**

**Third quarter**

- No scoring plays

**Fourth quarter**

- BUF – Keon Coleman 35-yard pass from Josh Allen (pass failed), 12:36. Dolphins 16–6. **Drive: 8 plays, 98 yards, 4:24.**
- MIA – De'Von Achane 59-yard run (Riley Patterson kick), 6:31. Dolphins 23–6. **Drive: 2 plays, 62 yards, 0:39.**
- BUF – Jackson Hawes 26-yard pass from Josh Allen (Matt Prater kick), 3:36. Dolphins 23–13. **Drive: 11 plays, 65 yards, 2:55.**
- MIA – De'Von Achane 35-yard run (Riley Patterson kick), 3:17. Dolphins 30–13. **Drive: 3 plays, 37 yards, 0:19.**

**Top passers**

- BUF – Josh Allen – 28/40, 306 yards, 2 TD, INT
- MIA – Tua Tagovailoa – 15/21, 173 yards, 2 TD, 2 INT

**Top rushers**

- BUF – James Cook – 13 rushes, 53 yards
- MIA – De'Von Achane – 22 rushes, 174 yards, 2 TD

**Top receivers**

- BUF – Khalil Shakir – 7 receptions, 58 yards
- MIA – Jaylen Waddle – 5 receptions, 84 yards, TD

Although the Bills entered the game as more than touchdown favorites (-8.5) they were dominated by the Dolphins, snapping their seven-game winning streak against Miami. This marked their first loss to the Dolphins since Week 3 of the 2022 NFL season. The Dolphins offense turned the ball over on their first drive - a Tua Tagovailoa throw intercepted by Cole Bishop - but quickly regrouped, out-gaining Buffalo 221 to 90 in the first half. The Bills offense stumbled against the Dolphins, not converting a first down until the third quarter, and not scoring until the fourth. The Dolphins took away the ball three times. Josh Allen performed poorly, giving the ball away twice, culminating in a QBR of just 28.7. He threw his sole interception in the end zone, picked off by Ifeatu Melifonwu. In addition, Dalton Kincaid and rookie defender Landon Jackson were injured during the game, with Jackson joining Michael Hoecht, who suffered a torn Achilles the previous game, on injured reserve due to multiple torn knee ligaments.

==== Week 11: vs. Tampa Bay Buccaneers ====
Week 11: Tampa Bay Buccaneers at Buffalo Bills – Game summary

Quarter	1	2	3	4	Total
Buccaneers	3	17	6	6	**32**
**Bills**	7	14	10	13	**44**

at Highmark Stadium, Orchard Park, New York

- Date: November 16
- Game time: 1:00 p.m. EST
- Game weather: Cloudy, 38 °F (3 °C)
- Game attendance: 71,005
- Referee: Alex Moore
- TV announcers (CBS): Ian Eagle, J. J. Watt and Evan Washburn
- Recap, Game Book

Game information

**First quarter**

- TB – Chase McLaughlin 23-yard field goal, 8:54. Buccaneers 3–0. **Drive: 4 plays, 2 yards, 1:32.**
- BUF – Josh Allen 2-yard run (Matt Prater kick), 4:09. Bills 7–3. **Drive: 10 plays, 36 yards, 4:45.**

**Second quarter**

- TB – Baker Mayfield 4-yard run (Chase McLaughlin kick), 12:00. Buccaneers 10–7. **Drive: 11 plays, 69 yards, 7:09.**
- BUF – Tyrell Shavers 43-yard pass from Josh Allen (Matt Prater kick), 8:52. Bills 14–10. **Drive: 6 plays, 67 yards, 3:08.**
- TB – Sean Tucker 43-yard run (Chase McLaughlin kick), 5:37. Buccaneers 17–14. **Drive: 6 plays, 66 yards, 3:15.**
- BUF – Ty Johnson 52-yard pass from Josh Allen (Matt Prater kick), 0:36. Bills 21–17. **Drive: 4 plays, 92 yards, 0:32.**
- TB – Chase McLaughlin 36-yard field goal, 0:00. Bills 21–20. **Drive: 5 plays, 58 yards, 0:36.**

**Third quarter**

- TB – Sean Tucker 6-yard run (pass failed), 7:26. Buccaneers 26–21. **Drive: 7 plays, 43 yards, 3:46.**
- BUF – Matt Prater 39-yard field goal, 5:01. Buccaneers 26–24. **Drive: 5 plays, 25 yards, 2:25.**
- BUF – James Cook 25-yard pass from Josh Allen (Matt Prater kick), 3:48. Bills 31–26. **Drive: 1 play, 25 yards, 0:05.**

**Fourth quarter**

- TB – Sean Tucker 28-yard pass from Baker Mayfield (pass failed), 13:38. Buccaneers 32–31. **Drive: 9 plays, 62 yards, 5:10.**
- BUF – Josh Allen 5-yard run (pass failed), 9:06. Bills 37–32. **Drive: 8 plays, 81 yards, 4:32.**
- BUF – Josh Allen 9-yard run (Matt Prater kick), 2:35. Bills 44–32. **Drive: 8 plays, 85 yards, 4:40.**

**Top passers**

- TB – Baker Mayfield – 16/28, 173 yards, TD, INT
- BUF – Josh Allen – 19/30, 317 yards, 3 TD, 2 INT

**Top rushers**

- TB – Sean Tucker – 19 rushes, 106 yards, 2 TD
- BUF – James Cook – 16 rushes, 48 yards

**Top receivers**

- TB – Sterling Shepard – 4 receptions, 54 yards
- BUF – Tyrell Shavers – 4 receptions, 90 yards, TD

After a brutal loss to their division rival, the Bills hosted the Buccaneers in what would become a back-and-forth shootout. The Bills pulled ahead in the fourth quarter with back-to-back touchdowns as Josh Allen scored six total touchdowns. As Buccaneers quarterback Baker Mayfield attempted a last-ditch comeback effort in the final moments, he was strip-sacked by Daquan Jones, with linebacker Dorian Williams recovering the fumble to clinch the win for Buffalo. With the 44–32 victory, the Bills improved to 7–3 record, also ensuring an undefeated record against the Buccaneers in Highmark Stadium.

Despite throwing two interceptions, including one on the Buffalo 5-yard line that set up Tampa Bay's first field goal, Josh Allen broke several more records, including matching Cam Newton's regular season rushing touchdown record at 75 and becoming the only player in NFL history to have two games with 3 passing and 3 rushing touchdowns. His first was in Week 14 at the Los Angeles Rams during the 2024 season. Head coach Sean McDermott also achieved his 100th career win across both the regular and postseason.

==== Week 12: at Houston Texans ====
Week 12: Buffalo Bills at Houston Texans – Game summary

Quarter	1	2	3	4	Total
Bills	6	10	0	3	**19**
**Texans**	3	17	3	0	**23**

at NRG Stadium, Houston, Texas

- Date: November 20
- Game time: 8:15 p.m. EST/7:15 p.m. CST
- Game weather: None (retractable roof closed)
- Game attendance: 70,451
- Referee: Adrian Hill
- TV announcers (Prime Video): Al Michaels, Kirk Herbstreit and Kaylee Hartung
- Recap, Game Book

Game information

**First quarter**

- BUF – James Cook 45-yard run (kick failed), 9:11. Bills 6–0. **Drive: 10 plays, 81 yards, 4:44.**
- HOU – Ka'imi Fairbairn 24-yard field goal, 4:32. Bills 6–3. **Drive: 10 plays, 54 yards, 4:39.**

**Second quarter**

- BUF – Matt Prater 44-yard field goal, 9:35. Bills 9–3. **Drive: 13 plays, 69 yards, 7:03.**
- HOU – Christian Kirk 2-yard pass from Davis Mills (Ka'imi Fairbairn kick), 3:47. Texans 10–9. **Drive: 12 plays, 77 yards, 5:48.**
- HOU – Ka'imi Fairbairn 43-yard field goal, 1:56. Texans 13–9. **Drive: 4 plays, 5 yards, 1:30.**
- BUF – Ray Davis 97-yard kickoff return (Matt Prater kick), 1:43. Bills 16–13.
- HOU – Jayden Higgins 8-yard pass from Davis Mills (Ka'imi Fairbairn kick), 0:05. Texans 20–16. **Drive: 6 plays, 75 yards, 1:38.**

**Third quarter**

- HOU – Ka'imi Fairbairn 26-yard field goal, 0:17. Texans 23–16. **Drive: 7 plays, 14 yards, 3:52.**

**Fourth quarter**

- BUF – Matt Prater 38-yard field goal, 5:44. Texans 23–19. **Drive: 7 plays, 42 yards, 3:25.**

**Top passers**

- BUF – Josh Allen – 24/34, 253 yards, 2 INT
- HOU – Davis Mills – 16/30, 153 yards, 2 TD

**Top rushers**

- BUF – James Cook – 17 rushes, 116 yards, TD
- HOU – Woody Marks – 16 rushes, 74 yards

**Top receivers**

- BUF – Khalil Shakir – 8 receptions, 110 yards
- HOU – Nico Collins – 3 receptions, 55 yards

The Texans’ defense, featuring pass rushers Will Anderson Jr. and Danielle Hunter, dominated the Bills’ offensive line, sacking Josh Allen eight times and intercepting him near the endzone to snuff out Buffalo's final drive which included a 44-yard hook and ladder on a fourth-and-27 play involving receivers Josh Palmer and Khalil Shakir. With the loss, the Bills fell to 7–4 and lost their sixth consecutive game in Houston. It also snapped the Bills six-game win streak on Thursday Night Football. The Bills dropped to 2–3 on the road.

==== Week 13: at Pittsburgh Steelers ====
Week 13: Buffalo Bills at Pittsburgh Steelers – Game summary

Quarter	1	2	3	4	Total
**Bills**	0	3	13	10	**26**
Steelers	0	7	0	0	**7**

at Acrisure Stadium, Pittsburgh, Pennsylvania

- Date: November 30
- Game time: 4:25 p.m. EST
- Game weather: Cloudy, 34 °F (1 °C)
- Game attendance: 66,068
- Referee: Alex Kemp
- TV announcers (CBS): Jim Nantz, Tony Romo and Tracy Wolfson
- Recap, Game Book

Game information

**First quarter**

- No scoring plays

**Second quarter**

- PIT – Jaylen Warren 1-yard run (Chris Boswell kick), 8:09. Steelers 7–0. **Drive: 6 plays, 39 yards, 2:23.**
- BUF – Matt Prater 27-yard field goal, 0:51. Steelers 7–3. **Drive: 16 plays, 60 yards, 7:18.**

**Third quarter**

- BUF – Christian Benford 17-yard fumble recovery (Matt Prater kick), 14:44. Bills 10–7.
- BUF – Keon Coleman 1-yard pass from Josh Allen (kick failed), 8:49. Bills 16–7. **Drive: 8 plays, 56 yards, 4:27.**

**Fourth quarter**

- BUF – Josh Allen 8-yard run (Matt Prater kick), 14:08. Bills 23–7. **Drive: 15 plays, 83 yards, 8:14.**
- BUF – Matt Prater 37-yard field goal, 1:07. Bills 26–7. **Drive: 14 plays, 72 yards, 9:04.**

**Top passers**

- BUF – Josh Allen – 15/23, 123 yards, TD, INT
- PIT – Aaron Rodgers – 10/21, 117 yards

**Top rushers**

- BUF – James Cook – 32 rushes, 144 yards
- PIT – Jaylen Warren – 10 rushes, 35 yards, TD

**Top receivers**

- BUF – James Cook – 3 receptions, 33 yards
- PIT – Darnell Washington – 2 receptions, 45 yards

Coming off another tough loss, the Bills started off slow on offense against the Steelers, as Josh Allen threw an early pick and James Cook lost a fumble, setting up Jaylen Warren’s short touchdown run. Buffalo trailed 7–3 at halftime but erupted after the break. Pass rusher Joey Bosa strip-sacked Aaron Rodgers on Pittsburgh's first play from scrimmage in the third quarter as cornerback Christian Benford returned the fumble for a score. Benford then intercepted backup Mason Rudolph, who came into the game temporarily as Rodgers was injured, leading to Allen’s 1-yard strike to Keon Coleman. Allen added an 8-yard rushing touchdown, and Matt Prater nailed two field goals.

Despite starting offensive tackles Spencer Brown and Dion Dawkins both missing the game due to injury, Buffalo’s ground game overwhelmed Pittsburgh, piling up 249 rushing yards — a record for a visiting team at Acrisure Stadium — by often using the same rushing play repeatedly, as the Bills offense held the ball for nearly 42 minutes. The 26–7 win lifted the Bills to 8–4. It was also the most rushing yards allowed by the Steelers since 1975, when the Bills recorded 310 yards on the ground. Josh Allen recorded his 76th rushing touchdown, surpassing Cam Newton’s mark for the most rushing touchdowns by a quarterback in NFL history.

==== Week 14: vs. Cincinnati Bengals ====
Week 14: Cincinnati Bengals at Buffalo Bills – Game summary

Quarter	1	2	3	4	Total
Bengals	7	14	0	13	**34**
**Bills**	3	8	7	21	**39**

at Highmark Stadium, Orchard Park, New York

- Date: December 7
- Game time: 1:00 p.m. EST
- Game weather: Snow, 31 °F (−1 °C)
- Game attendance: 70,613
- Referee: Brad Rogers
- TV announcers (Fox): Joe Davis, Greg Olsen and Pam Oliver
- Recap, Game Book

Game information

**First quarter**

- CIN – Chase Brown 5-yard run (Evan McPherson kick), 6:44. Bengals 7–0. **Drive: 14 plays, 67 yards, 8:16.**
- BUF – Matt Prater 26-yard field goal, 1:54. Bengals 7–3. **Drive: 8 plays, 69 yards, 4:50.**

**Second quarter**

- CIN – Tee Higgins 21-yard pass from Joe Burrow (Evan McPherson kick), 13:33. Bengals 14–3. **Drive: 6 plays, 55 yards, 3:21.**
- BUF – Khalil Shakir 11-yard pass from Josh Allen (Josh Allen–Dawson Knox pass), 7:27. Bengals 14–11. **Drive: 12 plays, 70 yards, 6:06.**
- CIN – Chase Brown 10-yard pass from Joe Burrow (Evan McPherson kick), 3:18. Bengals 21–11. **Drive: 8 plays, 69 yards, 4:09.**

**Third quarter**

- BUF – Dalton Kincaid 5-yard pass from Josh Allen (Matt Prater kick), 9:20. Bengals 21–18. **Drive: 9 plays, 75 yards, 5:40.**

**Fourth quarter**

- CIN – Mike Gesicki 12-yard pass from Joe Burrow (Evan McPherson kick), 8:44. Bengals 28–18. **Drive: 12 plays, 80 yards, 7:02.**
- BUF – Josh Allen 40-yard run (Matt Prater kick), 7:33. Bengals 28–25. **Drive: 4 plays, 68 yards, 1:11.**
- BUF – Christian Benford 63-yard interception return (Matt Prater kick), 5:25. Bills 32–28.
- BUF – Jackson Hawes 3-yard pass from Josh Allen (Matt Prater kick), 3:03. Bills 39–28. **Drive: 5 plays, 29 yards, 2:08.**
- CIN – Tee Higgins 25-yard pass from Joe Burrow (pass failed), 2:13. Bills 39–34. **Drive: 4 plays, 66 yards, 0:50.**

**Top passers**

- CIN – Joe Burrow – 25/36, 284 yards, 4 TD, 2 INT
- BUF – Josh Allen – 22/28, 251 yards, 3 TD

**Top rushers**

- CIN – Samaje Perine – 6 rushes, 31 yards
- BUF – James Cook – 18 rushes, 80 yards

**Top receivers**

- CIN – Tee Higgins – 6 receptions, 92 yards, 2 TD
- BUF – Dawson Knox – 6 receptions, 93 yards

Following a dominant win the previous week, the Bills faced Joe Burrow and the Bengals in a snowy shootout game. Burrow and the Bengals scored touchdowns on each of their first three offensive drives, holding the lead for much of the game by as much as 10 points at times, in addition to forcing James Cook to fumble twice in the red zone. However, Buffalo took the lead after scoring 21 points in just four-and-a-half minutes in the fourth quarter, as Josh Allen scored on a 40-yard scramble and Burrow threw his first two interceptions of the year shortly afterwards, namely to Christian Benford, who scored a 63-yard pick-six touchdown, and edge rusher A. J. Epenesa, who set up Allen's passing score to Jackson Hawes. Cincinnati answered back quickly to cut the Bills' lead to 39–34, but Buffalo clinched the win on the ensuing drive as Allen rushed for 17 yards on a 3rd-and-15 play.

With the win, which was also Allen's first over Burrow, the Bills improved to 9–4, earning their seventh consecutive winning season and their eighth over the past nine seasons. They also improved to 3–0 against the AFC North on the season.

==== Week 15: at New England Patriots ====
Week 15: Buffalo Bills at New England Patriots – Game summary

Quarter	1	2	3	4	Total
**Bills**	0	7	14	14	**35**
Patriots	14	10	0	7	**31**

at Gillette Stadium, Foxborough, Massachusetts

- Date: December 14
- Game time: 1:00 p.m. EST
- Game weather: Snow, 32 °F (0 °C)
- Game attendance: 64,628
- Referee: John Hussey
- TV announcers (CBS): Ian Eagle, J. J. Watt and Evan Washburn
- Recap, Game Book

Game information

**First quarter**

- NE – Drake Maye 8-yard run (Andres Borregales kick), 10:21. Patriots 7–0. **Drive: 8 plays, 73 yards, 4:39.**
- NE – Drake Maye 7-yard run (Andres Borregales kick), 0:25. Patriots 14–0. **Drive: 6 plays, 50 yards, 3:18.**

**Second quarter**

- NE – TreVeyon Henderson 52-yard run (Andres Borregales kick), 5:53. Patriots 21–0. **Drive: 8 plays, 94 yards, 4:37.**
- BUF – James Cook 5-yard pass from Josh Allen (Matt Prater kick), 1:56. Patriots 21–7. **Drive: 7 plays, 42 yards, 3:57.**
- NE – Andres Borregales 36-yard field goal, 0:00. Patriots 24–7. **Drive: 7 plays, 47 yards, 1:56.**

**Third quarter**

- BUF – Dawson Knox 4-yard pass from Josh Alen (Matt Prater kick), 11:29. Patriots 24–14. **Drive: 6 plays, 44 yards, 3:31.**
- BUF – James Cook 3-yard run (Matt Prater kick), 3:49. Patriots 24–21. **Drive: 11 plays, 70 yards, 5:29.**

**Fourth quarter**

- BUF – Dawson Knox 14-yard pass from Josh Allen (Matt Prater kick), 10:03. Bills 28–24. **Drive: 13 plays, 91 yards, 6:27.**
- NE – TreVeyon Henderson 65-yard run (Andres Borregales kick), 9:49. Patriots 31–28. **Drive: 1 play, 65 yards, 0:14.**
- BUF – James Cook 11-yard run (Matt Prater kick), 6:48. Bills 35–31. **Drive: 7 plays, 65 yards, 3:01.**

**Top passers**

- BUF – Josh Allen – 19/28, 193 yards, 3 TD
- NE – Drake Maye – 14/23, 155 yards, INT

**Top rushers**

- BUF – James Cook – 22 rushes, 107 yards, 2 TD
- NE – TreVeyon Henderson – 14 rushes, 148 yards, 2 TD

**Top receivers**

- BUF – Khalil Shakir – 5 receptions, 65 yards
- NE – Mack Hollins – 4 receptions, 41 yards

Looking to remain in contention for their sixth straight AFC East title, the Bills struggled in the first half, allowing the Patriots to build a 21–0 lead behind a strong rushing attack. However, similar to their previous two games, Buffalo surged from that point on, outscoring New England 28–3 to retake the lead early in the fourth quarter as the defense limited Drake Maye and the Patriots’ passing attack. Despite surrendering a long touchdown run to TreVeyon Henderson shortly thereafter, the Bills took the lead for good on a James Cook rushing touchdown. With the 35–31 victory, Buffalo improved to 10–4 and snapped the Patriots’ 10-game winning streak.

The 21-point comeback was the Bills’ largest since overcoming a similar 21–0 first-half deficit against the Patriots during the 2011 season. The 21-point comeback is the largest by a visiting team in the history of Gillette Stadium. With two touchdown receptions, tight end Dawson Knox set a new Bills franchise record for receiving touchdowns by a tight end (26), surpassing Pete Metzelaars.

With the Kansas City Chiefs eliminated from the playoffs, the Buffalo Bills now hold the NFL’s longest active playoff streak, having qualified for the postseason in every season since 2019.

==== Week 16: at Cleveland Browns ====
Week 16: Buffalo Bills at Cleveland Browns – Game summary

Quarter	1	2	3	4	Total
**Bills**	7	13	3	0	**23**
Browns	7	3	7	3	**20**

at Huntington Bank Field, Cleveland, Ohio

- Date: December 21
- Game time: 1:00 p.m. EST
- Game weather: Sunny, 25 °F (−4 °C)
- Game attendance: 67,580
- Referee: Bill Vinovich
- TV announcers (CBS): Ian Eagle, J. J. Watt and Evan Washburn
- Recap, Game Book

Game information

**First quarter**

- CLE – Harold Fannin Jr. 13-yard pass from Shedeur Sanders (Andre Szmyt kick), 10:42. Browns 7–0. **Drive: 8 plays, 69 yards, 4:18.**
- BUF – James Cook 44-yard run (Michael Badgley kick), 7:47. Tied 7–7. **Drive: 5 plays, 80 yards, 2:55.**

**Second quarter**

- BUF – Ty Johnson 2-yard run (kick failed), 12:54. Bills 13–7. **Drive: 9 plays, 61 yards, 5:01.**
- CLE – Andre Szmyt 24-yard field goal, 5:38. Bills 13–10. **Drive: 13 plays, 65 yards, 7:16.**
- BUF – James Cook 3-yard run (Michael Badgley kick), 2:23. Bills 20–10. **Drive: 7 plays, 68 yards, 3:15.**

**Third quarter**

- BUF – Michael Badgley 41-yard field goal, 9:37. Bills 23–10. **Drive: 4 plays, 2 yards, 1:02.**
- CLE – Harold Fannin Jr. 1-yard run (Andre Szmyt kick), 1:36. Bills 23–17. **Drive: 14 plays, 67 yards, 8:01.**

**Fourth quarter**

- CLE – Andre Szymt 41-yard field goal, 8:46. Bills 23–20. **Drive: 8 plays, 43 yards, 4:44.**

**Top passers**

- BUF – Josh Allen – 12/19, 130 yards
- CLE – Shedeur Sanders – 20/29, 157 yards, TD, 2 INT

**Top rushers**

- BUF – James Cook – 16 rushes, 117 yards, 2 TD
- CLE – Shedeur Sanders – 4 rushes, 49 yards

**Top receivers**

- BUF – Khalil Shakir – 4 receptions, 34 yards
- CLE – Trayveon Williams – 4 receptions, 38 yards

With their win and the following day’s loss by the Indianapolis Colts to the San Francisco 49ers, the Bills clinched a playoff berth, marking their seventh consecutive postseason appearance and the longest active playoff streak in the NFL. The Bills would also be the only AFC East team to sweep the AFC North and become the 5th NFL team to have 6 consecutive seasons with 11 or more wins. Buffalo would finish 5-3 on the road.

==== Week 17: vs. Philadelphia Eagles ====
Week 17: Philadelphia Eagles at Buffalo Bills – Game summary

Quarter	1	2	3	4	Total
**Eagles**	7	6	0	0	**13**
Bills	0	0	0	12	**12**

at Highmark Stadium, Orchard Park, New York

- Date: December 28
- Game time: 4:25 p.m. EST
- Game weather: Rain, 38 °F (3 °C)
- Game attendance: 71,105
- Referee: Ron Torbert
- TV announcers (Fox): Kevin Burkhardt, Tom Brady, Erin Andrews and Tom Rinaldi
- Recap, Game Book

Game information

**First quarter**

- PHI – Dallas Goedert 1-yard pass from Jalen Hurts (Jake Elliott kick), 0:35. Eagles 7–0. **Drive: 7 plays, 45 yards, 3:28.**

**Second quarter**

- PHI – Jake Elliott 47-yard field goal, 5:03. Eagles 10–0. **Drive: 13 plays, 48 yards, 5:54.**
- PHI – Jake Elliott 28-yard field goal, 0:08. Eagles 13–0. **Drive: 10 plays, 61 yards, 2:41.**

**Third quarter**

- No scoring plays

**Fourth quarter**

- BUF – Josh Allen 2-yard run (kick blocked), 5:11. Eagles 13–6. **Drive: 11 plays, 54 yards, 5:51.**
- BUF – Josh Allen 1-yard run (pass failed), 0:05. Eagles 13–12. **Drive: 13 plays, 83 yards, 3:16.**

**Top passers**

- PHI – Jalen Hurts – 13/27, 110 yards, TD
- BUF – Josh Allen – 23/35, 262 yards

**Top rushers**

- PHI – Saquon Barkley – 19 rushes, 68 yards
- BUF – James Cook – 20 rushes, 74 yards

**Top receivers**

- PHI – A. J. Brown – 5 receptions, 68 yards
- BUF – Brandin Cooks – 4 receptions, 101 yards

Trailing the defending champion Philadelphia Eagles 13–0 entering the fourth quarter, the Bills managed to mount a late rally to bring themselves back into the game. Josh Allen's two-yard touchdown run got Buffalo on the board with 5:11 remaining, but Michael Badgley's extra point would be blocked, which would prove critical later in the game. After the Bills stopped the Eagles on defense, Allen scored his second touchdown to pull within one point with five seconds remaining. The Bills elected to go for two to try and win, but Allen's pass for Khalil Shakir sailed off-target and out of the end zone, sealing what would ultimately be Buffalo's final loss at Highmark Stadium.

With the upset loss, the Buffalo Bills’ five-year streak of clinching the AFC East was snapped, as the Patriots secured the division title.

==== Week 18: vs. New York Jets ====
Week 18: New York Jets at Buffalo Bills – Game summary

Quarter	1	2	3	4	Total
Jets	0	0	0	8	**8**
**Bills**	7	14	8	6	**35**

at Highmark Stadium, Orchard Park, New York

- Date: January 4
- Game time: 4:25 p.m. EST
- Game weather: Cloudy, 27 °F (−3 °C)
- Game attendance: 70,944
- Referee: Alan Eck
- TV announcers (CBS): Andrew Catalon, Charles Davis, Jason McCourty and AJ Ross
- Recap, Game Book

Game information

**First quarter**

- BUF – Dawson Knox 17-yard pass from Mitch Trubisky (Matt Prater kick), 8:17. Bills 7–0. **Drive: 11 plays, 80 yards, 6:43.**

**Second quarter**

- BUF – Ty Johnson 6-yard run (Matt Prater kick), 11:43. Bills 14–0. **Drive: 13 plays, 84 yards, 6:21.**
- BUF – Ray Davis 2-yard pass from Mitch Trubisky (Matt Prater kick), 4:58. Bills 21–0. **Drive: 5 plays, 51 yards, 2:53.**

**Third quarter**

- BUF – Gabe Davis 2-yard pass from Mitch Trubisky (Mitch Trubisky–Keon Coleman pass), 7:46. Bills 29–0. **Drive: 11 plays, 54 yards, 5:03.**

**Fourth quarter**

- BUF – Ty Johnson 6-yard pass from Mitch Trubisky (pass failed), 12:05. Bills 35–0. **Drive: 5 plays, 55 yards, 2:55.**
- NYJ – Andrew Beck 2-yard pass from Brady Cook (Brady Cook–Quentin Skinner pass), 7:33. Bills 35–8. **Drive: 10 plays, 48 yards, 4:32.**

**Top passers**

- NYJ – Brady Cook – 11/22, 60 yards, TD
- BUF – Mitch Trubisky – 22/29, 259 yards, 4 TD

**Top rushers**

- NYJ – Khalil Herbert – 12 rushes, 42 yards
- BUF – Ray Davis – 21 rushes, 151 yards

**Top receivers**

- NYJ – Isaiah Williams – 5 receptions, 24 yards
- BUF – Keon Coleman – 2 receptions, 49 yards

Entering their final game at Highmark Stadium, the Bills mostly rested their starters, but still dominated the Jets for much of the game, scoring 35 points behind backup quarterback Mitchell Trubisky and running back Ray Davis. The Bills finished the regular season at 12–5, 4–2 against the AFC East, and 7–2 at home.

The victory, combined with the Chargers’ loss at Denver, allowed Buffalo to move up one spot and clinch the No. 6 seed, and they were scheduled to face the Jacksonville Jaguars in the Wild Card Round.

=== Standings ===
==== Division ====
AFC East
	W	L	T	PCT	DIV	CONF	PF	PA	STK
^{(2)} New England Patriots	14	3	0	.824	5–1	9–3	490	320	W3
^{(6)} Buffalo Bills	12	5	0	.706	4–2	9–3	481	365	W1
Miami Dolphins	7	10	0	.412	3–3	3–9	347	424	L1
New York Jets	3	14	0	.176	0–6	2–10	300	503	L5

==== Conference ====
AFC
Seed	Team	Division	W	L	T	PCT	DIV	CONF	SOS	SOV	STK
**Division leaders**
1 (Note: Denver finished ahead of New England based on common games (Denver 6–0 to New England 5–1 against: Cincinnati, Las Vegas, NY Giants, NY Jets and Tennessee).)	Denver Broncos	West	14	3	0	.824	5–1	9–3	.422	.378	W2
2	New England Patriots	East	14	3	0	.824	5–1	9–3	.391	.370	W3
3	Jacksonville Jaguars	South	13	4	0	.765	5–1	10–2	.478	.425	W8
4	Pittsburgh Steelers	North	10	7	0	.588	4–2	8–4	.503	.453	W1
**Wild cards**
5 (Note: Houston finished ahead of Buffalo based on head-to-head victory.)	Houston Texans	South	12	5	0	.706	5–1	10–2	.522	.441	W9
6	Buffalo Bills	East	12	5	0	.706	4–2	9–3	.471	.412	W1
7	Los Angeles Chargers	West	11	6	0	.647	5–1	8–4	.469	.425	L2
**Did not qualify for the postseason**
8 (Note: Indianapolis finished ahead of Baltimore based on conference record (Indianapolis 6–6 to Baltimore 5–7).)	Indianapolis Colts	South	8	9	0	.471	2–4	6–6	.540	.382	L7
9	Baltimore Ravens	North	8	9	0	.471	3–3	5–7	.507	.408	L1
10	Miami Dolphins	East	7	10	0	.412	3–3	3–9	.488	.378	L1
11 (Note: Cincinnati finished ahead of Kansas City based on conference record (Cincinnati 5–7 to Kansas City 3–9).)	Cincinnati Bengals	North	6	11	0	.353	3–3	5–7	.521	.451	L1
12	Kansas City Chiefs	West	6	11	0	.353	1–5	3–9	.514	.363	L6
13	Cleveland Browns	North	5	12	0	.294	2–4	4–8	.486	.418	W2
14 (Note: Las Vegas finished ahead of NY Jets and Tennessee based on conference record (Las Vegas 3–9 to NY Jets 2–10 and Tennessee 2–10).)	Las Vegas Raiders	West	3	14	0	.176	1–5	3–9	.538	.451	W1
15 (Note: NY Jets finished ahead of Tennessee based on strength of victory (NY Jets .373 to Tennessee .275).)	New York Jets	East	3	14	0	.176	0–6	2–10	.552	.373	L5
16	Tennessee Titans	South	3	14	0	.176	0–6	2–10	.574	.275	L2
**Tiebreakers** (Note: When breaking ties for three or more teams under the NFL's rules, they are first broken within divisions, then comparing only the highest ranked remaining team from each division.)

== Postseason ==
=== Schedule ===
Round	Date	Opponent (seed)	Result	Record	Venue	Sources
Wild Card	January 11	at Jacksonville Jaguars (3)	W 27–24	1–0	EverBank Stadium	Recap
Divisional	January 17	at Denver Broncos (1)	L 30–33 (OT)	1–1	Empower Field at Mile High	Recap

=== Game summaries ===
==== AFC Wild Card Playoffs: at (3) Jacksonville Jaguars ====
AFC Wild Card Playoffs: (6) Buffalo Bills at (3) Jacksonville Jaguars – Game Summary

Quarter	1	2	3	4	Total
Bills	3	7	3	14	27
Jaguars	0	7	3	14	24

at EverBank Stadium, Jacksonville, Florida

- Date: January 11, 2026
- Game time: 1:05 p.m. EST
- Game weather: Cloudy, 62 °F (17 °C)
- Game attendance: 70,250
- Referee: Brad Allen
- TV announcers (CBS): Jim Nantz, Tony Romo, and Tracy Wolfson
- Recap, Game Book

Game information

First quarter

- BUF – Matt Prater 50-yard field goal, 2:54. Bills 3–0. Drive: 4 plays, 1 yard, 2:21.

Second quarter

- JAX – Brian Thomas Jr. 3-yard pass from Trevor Lawrence (Cam Little kick), 14:14. Jaguars 7–3. Drive: 7 plays, 65 yards, 3:40.
- BUF – Josh Allen 2-yard run (Matt Prater kick), 5:37. Bills 10–7. Drive: 10 plays, 92 yards, 5:42.

Third quarter

- BUF – Matt Prater 47-yard field goal, 8:12. Bills 13–7. Drive: 11 plays, 45 yards, 6:48.
- JAX – Cam Little 43-yard field goal, 5:47. Bills 13–10. Drive: 6 plays, 40 yards, 2:25.

Fourth quarter

- JAX – Parker Washington 6-yard pass from Trevor Lawrence (Cam Little kick), 12:55. Jaguars 17–13. Drive: 11 plays, 62 yards, 6:03.
- BUF – Dalton Kincaid 15-yard pass from Josh Allen (Matt Prater kick), 8:56. Bills 20–17. Drive: 9 plays, 65 yards, 3:59.
- JAX – Travis Etienne 14-yard pass from Trevor Lawrence (Cam Little kick), 4:03. Jaguars 24–20. Drive: 10 plays, 77 yards, 4:53.
- BUF – Josh Allen 1-yard run (Matt Prater kick), 1:04. Bills 27–24. Drive: 9 plays, 66 yards, 2:59.

Top passers

- BUF – Josh Allen – 28/35, 273 yards, TD
- JAX – Trevor Lawrence – 18/30, 207 yards, 3 TD, 2 INT

Top rushers

- BUF – James Cook – 15 rushes, 46 yards
- JAX – Travis Etienne – 10 rushes, 67 yards

Top receivers

- BUF – Khalil Shakir – 12 receptions, 82 yards
- JAX – Parker Washington – 7 receptions, 107 yards, TD

Going into the playoffs as a wild card team for the first time in six years, the Bills were slight underdogs entering their first game of the postseason. The Bills took a 10–7 halftime lead in a defensive battle, exchanging a turnover apiece with the Jaguars with numerous punts as Josh Allen was checked by the Bills' medical staff twice. The Jaguars failed to capitalize on two scoring opportunities, as quarterback Trevor Lawrence was stopped short on fourth down inside the Bills' 10-yard line after Jacksonville recovered a fumbled kickoff return by Ray Davis, and kicker Cam Little missed a 54-yard field goal at the end of the half.

After exchanging field goals in the third quarter, Buffalo and Jacksonville combined for four touchdowns in the fourth quarter, switching leads with each score. Despite two passing touchdowns from Lawrence to Parker Washington and Travis Etienne, Allen passed for one to Dalton Kincaid and rushed for one to put the Bills in the lead with just over a minute left. With no timeouts remaining for Jacksonville, Lawrence was intercepted by Cole Bishop off a deflected pass on the ensuing drive, sealing the win for Buffalo.

With the 27–24 win, which was also their first road playoff win since 1992, the Bills advanced to the Divisional Round for the sixth consecutive year. In addition, this was also the first time the Bills defeated the Jaguars in the playoffs.

==== AFC Divisional Playoffs: at (1) Denver Broncos ====
AFC Divisional Playoffs: (6) Buffalo Bills at (1) Denver Broncos – Game summary

Quarter	1	2	3	4	OT	Total
Bills	7	3	7	13	0	30
Broncos	3	17	3	7	3	33

at Empower Field at Mile High, Denver, Colorado

- Date: January 17, 2026
- Game time: 4:35 p.m. EST/2:35 p.m. MST
- Game weather: Sunny, 36 °F (2 °C)
- Game attendance: 77,043
- Referee: Carl Cheffers
- TV announcers (CBS): Jim Nantz, Tony Romo and Tracy Wolfson
- Recap, Game Book

Game information

First quarter

- DEN – Wil Lutz 28-yard field goal, 7:29. Broncos 3–0. Drive: 14 plays, 64 yards, 7:31.
- BUF – Mecole Hardman 4-yard pass from Josh Allen (Matt Prater kick), 0:05. Bills 7–3. Drive: 12 plays, 67 yards, 7:24.

Second quarter

- DEN – Frank Crum 7-yard pass from Bo Nix (Wil Lutz kick), 9:33. Broncos 10–7. Drive: 8 plays, 69 yards, 3:47.
- BUF – Matt Prater 33-yard field goal, 2:13. Tied 10–10. Drive: 13 plays, 69 yards, 7:20.
- DEN – Lil'Jordan Humphrey 29-yard pass from Bo Nix (Wil Lutz kick), 0:22. Broncos 17–10. Drive: 11 plays, 70 yards, 1:51.
- DEN – Wil Lutz 50-yard field goal, 0:00. Broncos 20–10. Drive: 1 play, 0 yards, 0:02.

Third quarter

- DEN – Wil Lutz 33-yard field goal, 11:35. Broncos 23–10. Drive: 4 plays, 2 yards, 2:33.
- BUF – Keon Coleman 10-yard pass from Josh Allen (Matt Prater kick), 6:49. Broncos 23–17. Drive: 9 plays, 73 yards, 4:46.

Fourth quarter

- BUF – Dalton Kincaid 14-yard pass from Josh Allen (Matt Prater kick), 13:24. Bills 24–23. Drive: 9 plays, 85 yards, 4:06.
- BUF – Matt Prater 31-yard field goal, 4:11. Bills 27–23. Drive: 13 plays, 68 yards, 7:39.
- DEN – Marvin Mims 26-yard pass from Bo Nix (Wil Lutz kick), 0:55. Broncos 30–27. Drive: 8 plays, 73 yards, 3:16.
- BUF – Matt Prater 50-yard field goal, 0:05. Tied 30–30. Drive: 8 plays, 41 yards, 0:50.

Overtime

- DEN – Wil Lutz 24-yard field goal, 4:44. Broncos 33–30. Drive: 6 plays, 75 yards, 3:02.

Top passers

- BUF – Josh Allen – 25/39, 283 yards, 3 TD, 2 INT
- DEN – Bo Nix – 26/46, 279 yards, 3 TD, INT

Top rushers

- BUF – James Cook – 24 rushes, 117 yards
- DEN – Bo Nix – 12 rushes, 29 yards

Top receivers

- BUF – Dalton Kincaid – 6 receptions, 83 yards, TD
- DEN – Marvin Mims – 8 receptions, 93 yards, TD

The Bills would enter halftime down 20-10 by allowing two scores with under two minutes remaining in the half. Out of the half, Josh Allen committed his second turnover that set up a Denver field goal. The Bills responded with a touchdown drive to cut the lead to six. After both teams exchanged interceptions, the Bills took the lead with a Josh Allen touchdown pass to Dalton Kincaid. The Bills scored again with a field goal that the Broncos would answer with touchdown that would give them a 30-27 lead with less than two minutes. The Bills tied the game with a 51-yard field goal by Matt Prater. To start overtime, the Bills would force the Broncos to punt. However, Allen threw an interception on a deep pass targeting wide receiver Brandin Cooks. The Broncos would go on to kick a game winning field goal on the ensuing drive.

With the overtime loss, the Bills' season ended with their fourth Divisional Round exit in the last five years. This would be Sean McDermott's final game as Buffalo's head coach, as he would end up being fired two days later.

This game reached an average of approximately 39.6 million viewers, with a peak of approximately 51.3 million viewers during overtime. It became the most-watched Saturday sports telecast since the 1994 Winter Olympics, and also became the most-watched Saturday afternoon telecast in American television history.
