= Daryl Porter =

Daryl Porter may refer to:

- Daryl Porter (safety) (born 1974), American football safety
- Daryl Porter Jr. (politician) (born 1990), American attorney and politician
- Daryl Porter Jr. (American football) (born 2002), American football cornerback
- Darrell Porter (1952–2002), American baseball player
