= Maxwell Hairston =

American football player (born 2003)

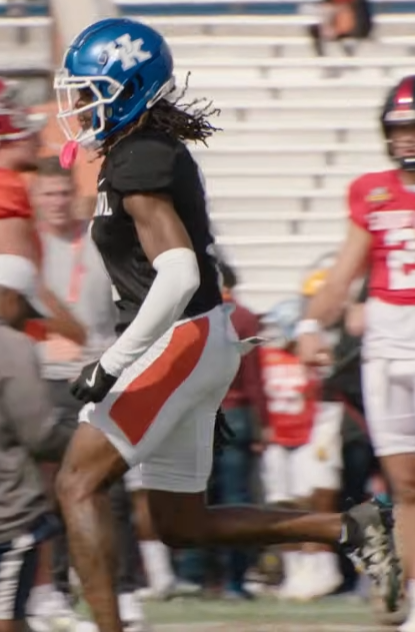
- Hairston at the 2025 Senior Bowl

No. 1 – Buffalo Bills
- Position: Cornerback
- Roster status: Active

Personal information
- Born: August 6, 2003 (age 23); West Bloomfield, Michigan, U.S.
- Listed height: 5 ft 11 in (1.80 m)
- Listed weight: 192 lb (87 kg)

Career information
- High school: West Bloomfield
- College: Kentucky (2021–2024)
- NFL draft: 2025: 1st round, 30th overall pick

Career history
- Buffalo Bills (2025–present)

Awards and highlights
- 2× Second-team All-SEC (2023, 2024)

Career NFL statistics as of Week 11, 2026
- Tackles: 34
- Pass deflections: 8
- Interceptions: 2
- Stats at Pro Football Reference

Maxwell Hairston (born August 6, 2003) is an American professional football cornerback for the Buffalo Bills of the National Football League (NFL). He played college football for the Kentucky Wildcats and was selected by the Bills in the first round of the 2025 NFL draft.

== Early life ==
Hairston was born on August 6, 2003, in West Bloomfield, Michigan. As a senior at West Bloomfield High School, he recorded 16 pass deflections, three interceptions, and three forced fumbles. Hairston committed to play college football at the University of Kentucky over other schools such as Kansas, Minnesota, Purdue, Virginia Tech, and Washington State.

== College career ==
As a freshman in 2022, Hairston totaled two tackles. In the 2023 season opener, he forced a fumble as he helped Kentucky beat Ball State 44–14. The next week, Hairston recorded his first career interception in a win over Eastern Kentucky. In week three of the 2023 season, he led the team with seven tackles with one going for a loss in a win over Akron. In week four, Hairston set the single-game school record with two interceptions returned for touchdowns, as he helped Kentucky beat the Vanderbilt Commodores.

== Professional career ==
Pre-draft measurables
Height	Weight	Arm length	Hand span	Wingspan	40-yard dash	10-yard split	20-yard split	Vertical jump	Broad jump
5 ft 11 1/4 in (1.81 m)	183 lb (83 kg)	31 in (0.79 m)	8 3/4 in (0.22 m)	6 ft 4 5/8 in (1.95 m)	4.28 s	1.50 s	2.51 s	39.5 in (1.00 m)	10 ft 9 in (3.28 m)
All values from NFL Combine

Hairston was selected by the Buffalo Bills in the first round with the 30th overall pick in the 2025 NFL draft. On June 13, Hairston signed his rookie contract, a four-year contract worth $15.2 million, with a fifth-year option. Hairston suffered an LCL sprain in a pre-season practice, causing him to begin the regular season on injured reserve.

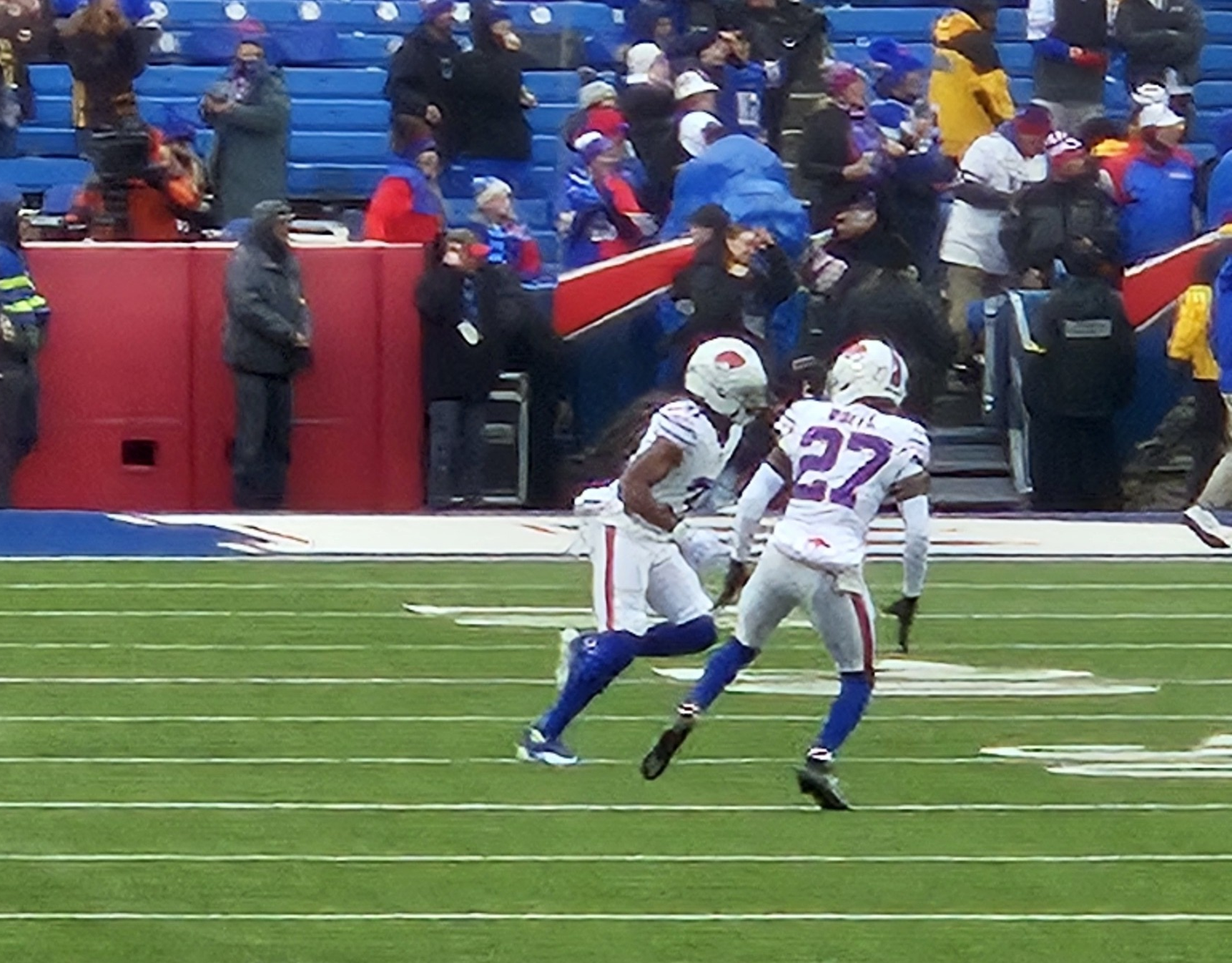
Hairston (#31) warming up with teammate Tre'Davious White (#27) before a game against the Tampa Bay Buccaneers in 2025

On October 25, 2025, Hairston was activated for his NFL debut ahead of Buffalo's Week 8 matchup against the Carolina Panthers. The following week, while matched up with Kansas City Chiefs receiver Xavier Worthy, known for running the fastest 40-yard dash in NFL Combine history, Hairston made his first career interception, sealing a 28-21 Bills win over the rival Chiefs. In his first start the following week versus the Miami Dolphins, Hairston was beat by Jaylen Waddle for a long touchdown, but bounced back in the second half, intercepting another pass intended for Waddle.

Hairston notably missed both of the Bills' playoff games due to an ankle injury suffered in week 18 of the regular season against the New York Jets. Despite this and other injuries he dealt with during the season, he was named by The Athletic to its All Rookie Team for his play during the season, with his two interceptions tied for third place among all rookies. He finished his rookie season with 18 total tackles (14 solo), 5 passes defensed, and two interceptions in 11 games played and three starts.

== Career statistics ==
=== NFL ===
Legend
**Bold**	Career High

==== Regular season ====
Year	Team	Games		Tackles					Interceptions						Fumbles		
Year	Team	GP	GS	Cmb	Solo	Ast	TFL	Sck	Int	Yds	Avg	Lng	TD	PD	FF	FR	TD
2025	BUF	11	3	18	14	4	0.0	0.0	2	1	0.5	1	0	5	0	0	0
2026	BUF	10	4	16	12	4	0.0	0.0	0	0	0.0	0	0	3	0	0	0
Career		21	7	34	26	8	0.0	0.0	2	1	0.5	1	0	8	0	0	0

=== College ===
Year	Team	GP	Tackles					Interceptions					Fumbles		
Year	Team	GP	Cmb	Solo	Ast	TFL	Sck	Int	Yds	Avg	TD	PD	FF	FR	TD
2022	Kentucky	12	2	1	1	0.0	0.0	0	0	0.0	0	0	0	0	0
2023	Kentucky	13	**68**	**55**	**13**	**1.5**	0.0	**5**	**131**	**26.2**	**2**	**6**	1	0	0
2024	Kentucky	7	19	15	4	1.0	**1.0**	1	25	25.0	1	4	**2**	0	0
Career		32	89	71	18	2.5	1.0	6	156	26.0	3	10	3	0	0

== Legal issues ==
Hairston was accused of sexual assault in 2021 while attending the University of Kentucky. The offenses of first degree rape and first-degree burglary were investigated, but he was never criminally charged. During the time of the NFL Draft, Bills General Manager Brandon Beane claimed "all teams were aware of the Title IX thing. That was fully investigated by the school. There’s everything out. He even volunteered to a polygraph and had notes". In July 2025, a federal lawsuit was filed that alleged Hairston entered the victim's dormitory uninvited, ignored the victim's lack of interest in sexual intercourse, forcefully removed the victim's shorts and subsequently sexually assaulted her.
