= Josh Palmer =

Canadian football player (born 1999)

Joshua Palmer
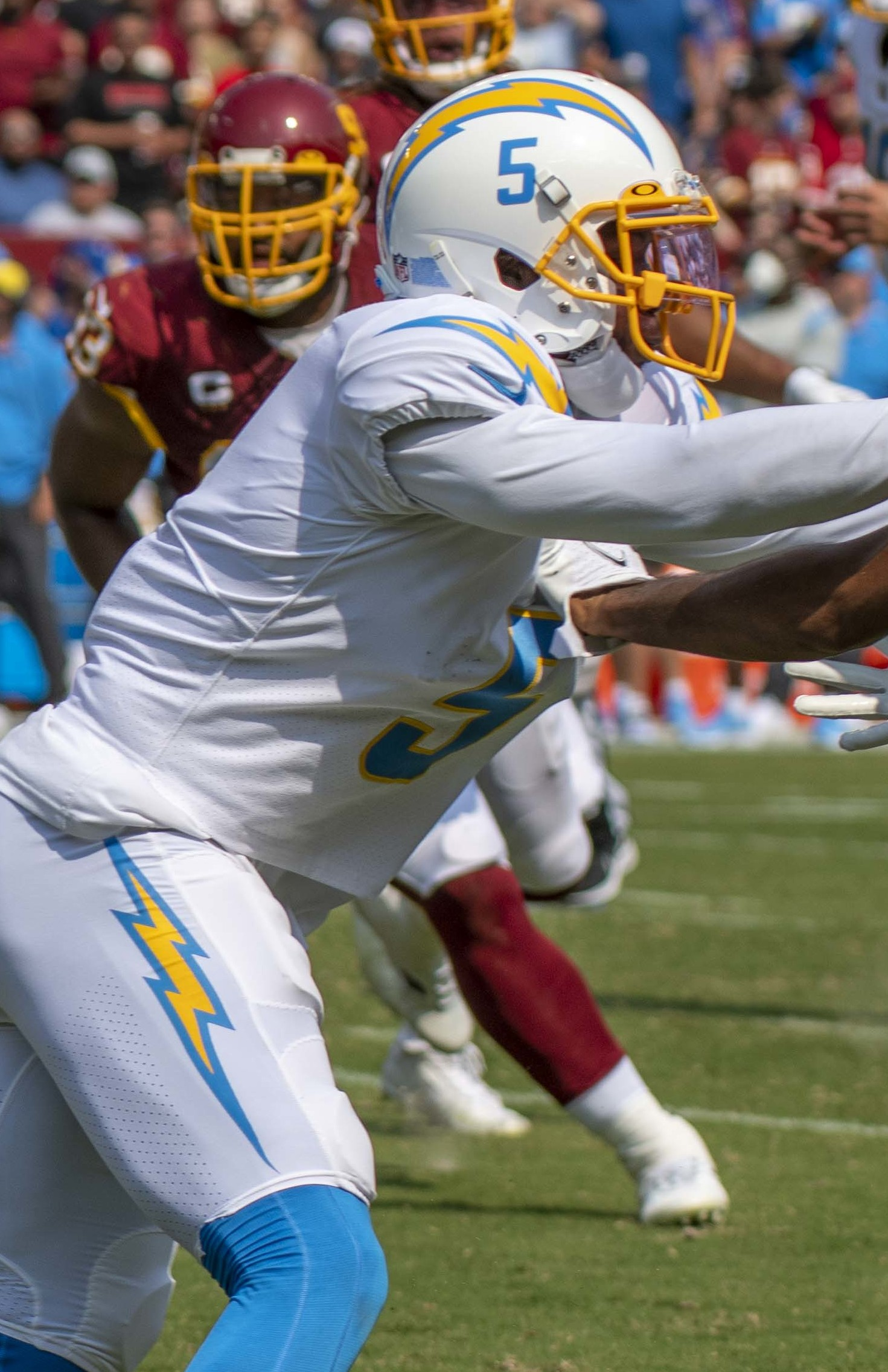
- Palmer with the Los Angeles Chargers in 2021

No. 5 – Buffalo Bills
- Position: Wide receiver
- Roster status: Injured reserve

Personal information
- Born: September 22, 1999 (age 27); Brampton, Ontario, Canada
- Listed height: 6 ft 1 in (1.85 m)
- Listed weight: 210 lb (95 kg)

Career information
- High school: St. Thomas Aquinas (Fort Lauderdale, Florida, U.S.)
- College: Tennessee (2017–2020)
- NFL draft: 2021: 3rd round, 77th overall pick

Career history
- Los Angeles Chargers (2021–2024); Buffalo Bills (2025–present)

Career NFL statistics as of Week 8, 2026
- Receptions: 208
- Receiving yards: 2,707
- Receiving touchdowns: 12
- Stats at Pro Football Reference

Joshua Keith Palmer (born September 22, 1999) is a Canadian professional football wide receiver for the Buffalo Bills of the National Football League (NFL). He played college football for the Tennessee Volunteers and was selected by the Los Angeles Chargers in the third round of the 2021 NFL draft.

== Early life ==
Palmer grew up in Brampton, Ontario, the son of Keith and Alethia Palmer. He is of Jamaican descent through both his parents. He has two sisters, Lanisha and Keiana. He initially attended St. Roch Catholic Secondary School, where he played basketball and ran track in addition to playing football. He was named St Roch's junior athlete of the year in tenth grade. He played wide receiver and defensive back helping St Roch win two JV football titles in ninth and tenth grade. He also played for the Burlington Stampeders of the Ontario Football Conference and the Brampton Bulldogs. After participating in summer football camps in the United States and receiving interest from several Division I football programs, Palmer transferred to St. Thomas Aquinas High School in Fort Lauderdale, Florida, for his final two years of high school. Palmer was rated a three star recruit and initially committed to play college football at Syracuse during the summer before his senior year. He finished his senior season with 32 receptions for 506 yards with eight touchdowns and was named second-team Class 7A All-State. Palmer de-committed from Syracuse and opted to sign to play at Tennessee.

== College career ==
Palmer played in all 12 of the Volunteers' games as a freshman, catching nine passes for 98 yards. He became a starter as a sophomore and finished the season with 23 receptions for 484 yards and two touchdowns and also rushed for one touchdown. Palmer caught 34 passes for 457 yards and one touchdown as a junior. He finished his senior season, which was shortened to nine games due to COVID-19, with 33 receptions for 475 yards and four touchdowns.

=== Statistics ===
Year	Team	Rec	Yds	Avg	TD
2017	Tennessee	9	98	10.9	0
2018	Tennessee	23	484	21.0	2
2019	Tennessee	34	457	13.4	1
2020	Tennessee	33	475	14.4	4
Career		99	1,514	15.3	7

== Professional career ==
Pre-draft measurables
Height	Weight	Arm length	Hand span	Wingspan	40-yard dash	10-yard split	20-yard split	20-yard shuttle	Three-cone drill	Vertical jump	Broad jump
6 ft 1 1/4 in (1.86 m)	210 lb (95 kg)	32 7/8 in (0.84 m)	9 5/8 in (0.24 m)	6 ft 4 7/8 in (1.95 m)	4.52 s	1.59 s	2.64 s	4.24 s	6.98 s	34.0 in (0.86 m)	10 ft 4 in (3.15 m)
All values from Pro Day

=== Los Angeles Chargers ===
==== 2021 ====
Palmer was selected by the Los Angeles Chargers in the third round (77th overall) of the 2021 NFL draft. Though eligible and ranked as the #1 Canadian prospect, he was not selected in the subsequent 2021 CFL draft. Palmer signed his four-year rookie contract with the Chargers on July 23, 2021.

Palmer had one catch for 17 yards in his NFL debut in Week 1 against the Washington Football Team. In Week 8, Palmer recorded his first career touchdown on a 24-yard reception from Justin Herbert in a 27–24 loss to the New England Patriots. Overall, in his rookie season, Palmer appeared in all 17 games, of which he started five. Palmer finished the 2021 season with 33 receptions for 353 receiving yards and four receiving touchdowns.

==== 2022 ====
In Week 9 against the Atlanta Falcons, Palmer had eight receptions for 106 receiving yards in the 20–17 victory. Two weeks later, against the Kansas City Chiefs, he had eight receptions for 106 receiving yards and two receiving touchdowns in the 30–27 loss. On the 2022 season, Palmer appeared in 16 games, of which he started 11. He finished with 72 receptions for 769 receiving yards and three receiving touchdowns.

==== 2023 ====
Palmer began the 2023 season third on the depth chart behind Keenan Allen and Mike Williams. Against the Kansas City Chiefs in Week 5, Palmer had five receptions for 133 yards in the 31–17 loss. During a game against the Chicago Bears in Week 8, he suffered a sprain to his right knee but continued to play throughout the game. After being ruled out for the next game against the New York Jets, he was placed on injured reserve on November 5, 2023. He was activated on December 12. In his first game back, he had four receptions for 113 yards and a touchdown in a 63–21 loss to the Las Vegas Raiders. He finished the 2023 season with 38 receptions for 581 yards and two touchdowns in ten games and six starts.

==== 2024 ====
In the 2024 season, Palmer finished with 39 receptions for 584 yards and one touchdown.

=== Buffalo Bills ===
==== 2025 ====
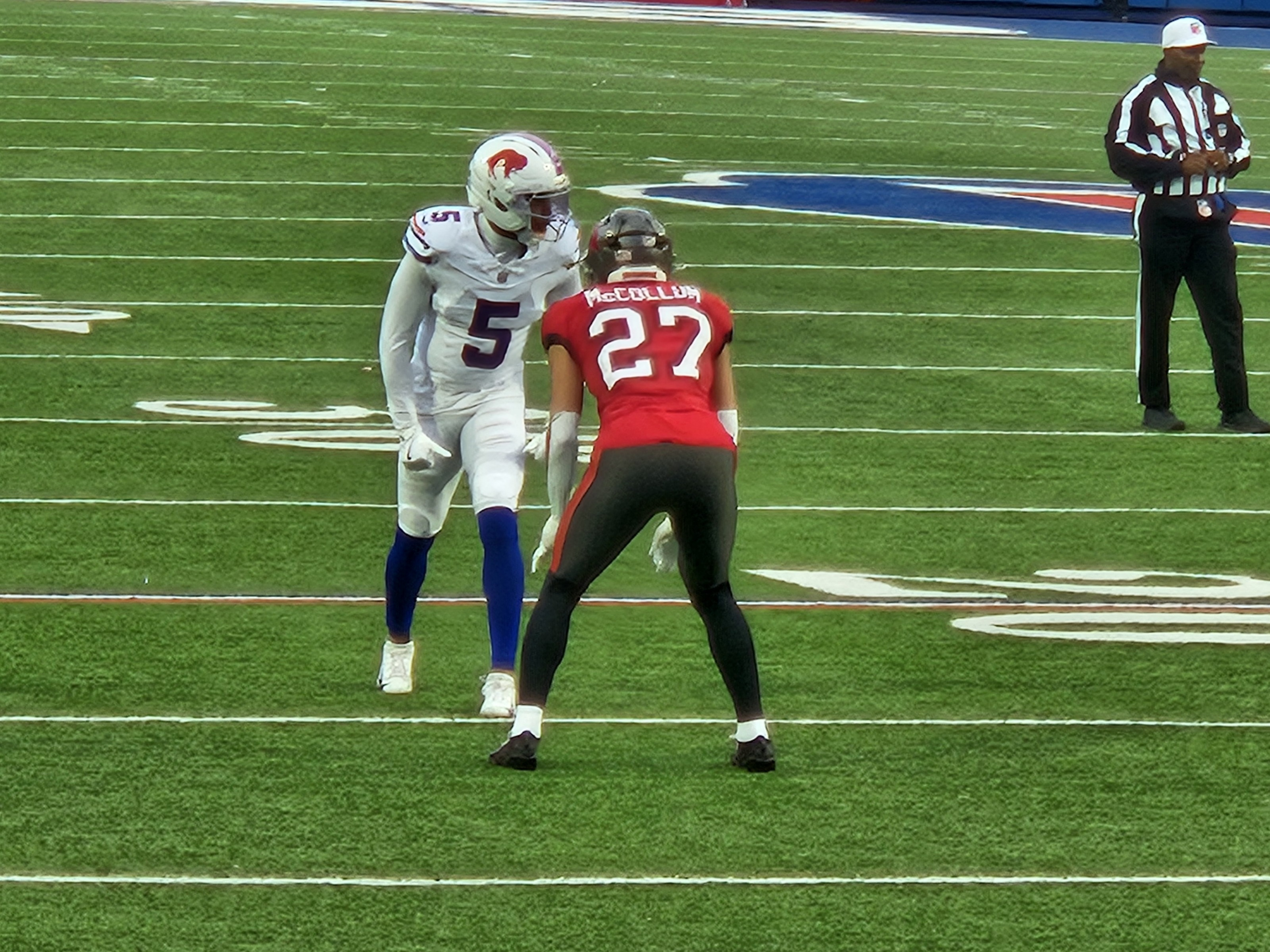
Palmer (#5) lined up against Zyon McCollum of the Tampa Bay Buccaneers in 2025

On March 13, 2025, Palmer signed a three-year deal with the Buffalo Bills. Palmer injured his knee and ankle during a loss to the Atlanta Falcons in Week 6, causing him to miss several games intermittently during the season as he dealt with the injuries. He finished the season with 22 catches for 303 yards and no touchdowns. Palmer was placed on injured reserve on January 10, 2026, ahead of the team's Wild Card matchup against the Jacksonville Jaguars.

==== 2026 ====
On opening week against the Houston Texans, Palmer caught his first touchdown as a Bill, a game-winning pass from Josh Allen, as Buffalo won against Houston in a 36-31 shootout. He caught another touchdown the following week during a 41-31 win over the Detroit Lions.

On November 9, 2026, Palmer was placed on injured reserve with a right hamstring injury.

== Career statistics ==
Legend
**Bold**	Career high

=== Regular season ===
Year	Team	Games		Receiving					
Year	Team	GP	GS	Tgt	Rec	Yds	Avg	Lng	TD
2021	LAC	**17**	5	49	33	353	10.7	36	**4**
2022	LAC	16	**11**	**107**	**72**	**769**	10.7	50	3
2023	LAC	10	6	61	38	581	15.3	**79**	2
2024	LAC	15	7	65	39	584	15.0	45	1
2025	BUF	12	8	37	22	303	13.8	45	0
2026	BUF	6	0	12	4	117	**29.3**	43	2
Career		76	37	331	208	2,707	13.0	79	12

=== Postseason ===
Year	Team	Games		Receiving					
Year	Team	GP	GS	Tgt	Rec	Yds	Avg	Lng	TD
2022	LAC	1	0	6	2	31	15.5	18	0
2025	BUF	Did not play due to injury							
Career		1	0	6	2	31	15.5	18	0
