= Cole Bishop =

American football player (born 2002)

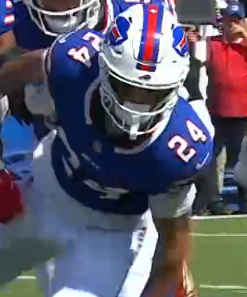
- Bishop with the Buffalo Bills in 2025

No. 24 – Buffalo Bills
- Position: Safety
- Roster status: Active

Personal information
- Born: October 24, 2002 (age 24); Boston, Massachusetts, U.S.
- Listed height: 6 ft 2 in (1.88 m)
- Listed weight: 206 lb (93 kg)

Career information
- High school: Starr's Mill (Fayetteville, Georgia)
- College: Utah (2021–2023)
- NFL draft: 2024: 2nd round, 60th overall pick

Career history
- Buffalo Bills (2024–present)

Awards and highlights
- Second-team All-Pac-12 (2023)

Career NFL statistics as of Week 11, 2026
- Total tackles: 184
- Sacks: 3
- Pass deflections: 12
- Interceptions: 3
- Forced fumbles: 2
- Stats at Pro Football Reference

Cole Bishop (born October 24, 2002) is an American professional football safety for the Buffalo Bills of the National Football League (NFL). He played college football for the Utah Utes.

== Early life ==
Bishop attended Starr's Mill High School in Fayetteville, Georgia. He committed to the University of Utah to play college football.

== College career ==
As a true freshman at Utah in 2021, Bishop played in 10 games and started the final six. He finished the year with 54 tackles and three sacks. As a sophomore in 2022, he started 13 of 14 games and led the team with 83 tackles and had one interception and 1.5 sacks. He returned to Utah for his junior year in 2023.

== Professional career ==
Pre-draft measurables
Height	Weight	Arm length	Hand span	Wingspan	40-yard dash	10-yard split	20-yard split	Vertical jump	Broad jump
6 ft 2 in (1.88 m)	206 lb (93 kg)	29 3/4 in (0.76 m)	9 1/2 in (0.24 m)	6 ft 1 in (1.85 m)	4.45 s	1.52 s	2.59 s	39.0 in (0.99 m)	10 ft 4 in (3.15 m)
All values from NFL Combine

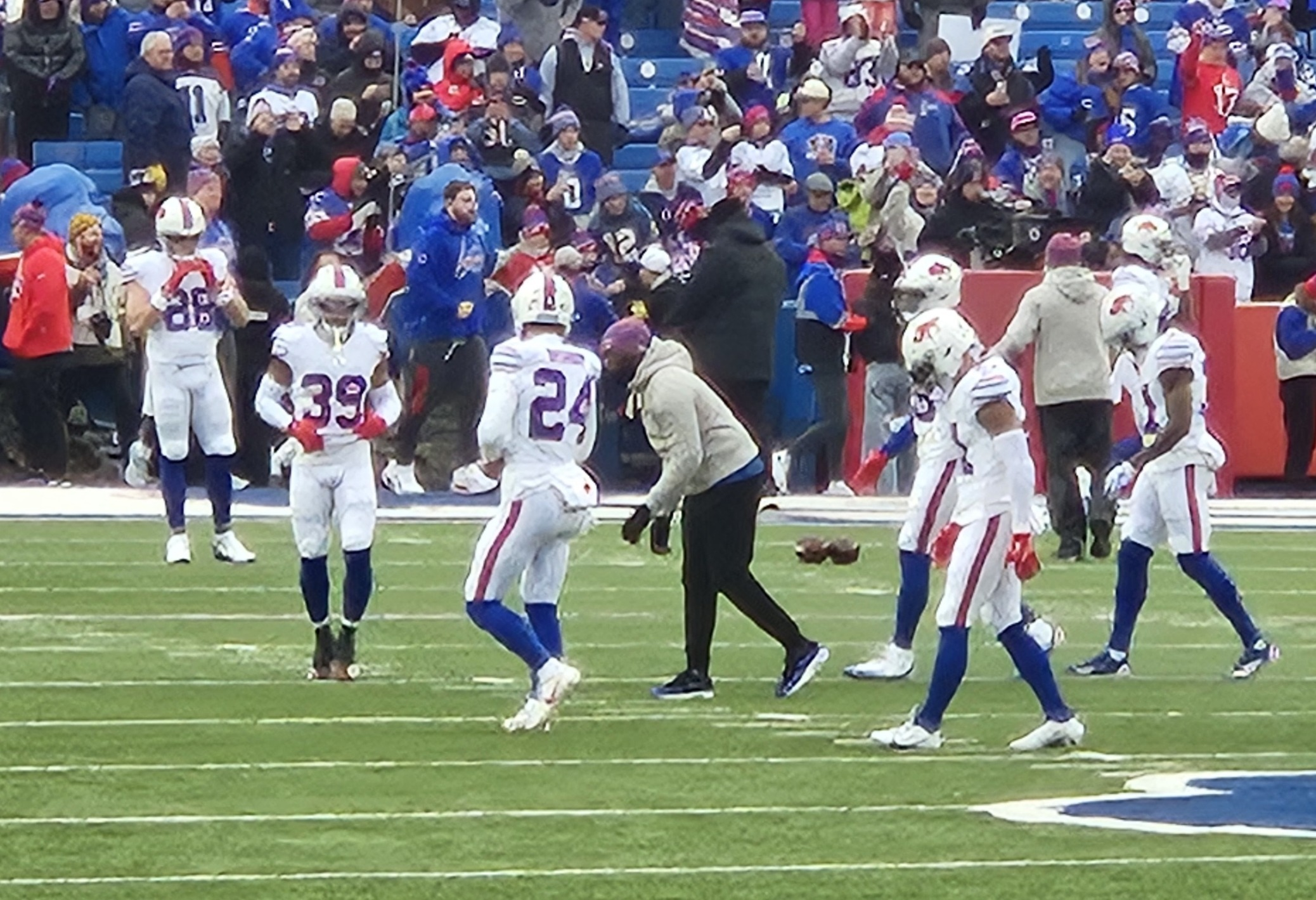
Bishop (#24) warming up with the Bills before a game against the Tampa Bay Buccaneers in 2025

Bishop was selected by the Buffalo Bills with the 60th overall pick in the second round of the 2024 NFL draft. He spent the majority of his rookie season as a backup to Damar Hamlin, but started on occasion. Bishop later won the starting safety spot in his sophomore season, playing alongside Taylor Rapp until the latter's season-ending injury. He caught his first career interception against the New Orleans Saints, foiling the Saints' attempt at executing their own version of the Philly Special. Bishop played a major role in the Bills' win over the Kansas City Chiefs in Week 9, leading the team in tackles and forcing a turnover on downs.

Bishop's play improved noticeably throughout his second season, with Sports Illustrated attributing it to mentorship from veteran teammate Jordan Poyer. Joe Buscaglia of The Athletic, who analyzed Bishop's play, wrote that Bishop became more confident and aware later in the season, taking advantage of his athleticism to make plays after struggling with positioning himself earlier on. Bishop totaled 85 tackles (53 solo), three interceptions, seven passes defensed, and two sacks in his sophomore season. In the playoffs, he made a crucial interception of Trevor Lawrence during the Bills' Wild Card game against the Jacksonville Jaguars, sealing Buffalo's first road playoff win since 1992.

On June 18, 2026, it was announced that Bishop had undergone surgery on his left knee, but would be expected to return in training camp.

== Career statistics ==
Legend
**Bold**	Career high

=== NFL ===
==== Regular season ====
Year	Team	Games		Tackles					Interceptions						Fumbles	
Year	Team	GP	GS	Cmb	Solo	Ast	TFL	Sck	PD	Int	Yds	Avg	Lng	TD	FF	FR
2024	BUF	16	4	40	25	15	1	0.0	2	0	0	—	0	0	**1**	0
2025	BUF	17	17	**85**	**53**	**32**	**4**	**2.0**	**7**	**3**	**16**	**5.3**	**12**	0	0	0
2026	BUF	10	10	59	34	25	3	1.0	3	0	0	—	0	0	**1**	0
Career		43	31	184	112	72	8	3.0	12	3	16	5.3	12	0	2	0

==== Postseason ====
Year	Team	Games		Tackles					Interceptions						Fumbles	
Year	Team	GP	GS	Cmb	Solo	Ast	TFL	Sck	PD	Int	Yds	Avg	Lng	TD	FF	FR
2024	BUF	3	1	13	**10**	3	0	0.0	0	0	0	0.0	0	0	0	0
2025	BUF	2	2	**14**	9	**5**	**2**	0.0	**1**	**1**	**2**	**2.0**	**2**	0	0	0
Career		5	3	27	19	8	2	0.0	1	1	2	2.0	2	0	0	0

=== College ===
Year	Team	GP	Tackles					Interceptions						Fumbles	
Year	Team	GP	Cmb	Solo	Ast	TFL	Sck	PD	Int	Yds	Avg	Lng	TD	FF	FR
2021	Utah	11	55	35	20	**9.0**	**3.0**	**5**	0	0	—	0	0	0	1
2022	Utah	14	**83**	**47**	**36**	6.0	1.5	3	1	0	0.0	0	0	0	1
2023	Utah	11	60	35	25	6.5	**3.0**	4	**2**	**10**	**5.0**	**9**	0	**1**	**2**
Career		36	198	117	81	21.5	7.5	12	3	10	3.3	9	0	1	4
