= Brandon Beane =

American football executive (born 1976)

Buffalo Bills
- Title: General manager, President of Football Operations

Personal information
- Born: July 27, 1976 (age 50); Norwood, North Carolina, U.S.

Career information
- College: UNC Wilmington

Career history
- Carolina Panthers (1998–2016); Personnel (1998–2007); Director of Football operations (2008–2014); Assistant General Manager (2015–2016); Buffalo Bills (2017–present); General Manager (2017–2025); President of Football Operations and General Manager (2026–present)

Awards and highlights
- 2× Sporting News Executive of the Year (2020, 2022)
- Executive profile at Pro Football Reference

Brandon Beane (born July 27, 1976) is an American professional football executive who is the president of football operations and general manager for the Buffalo Bills of the National Football League (NFL), a position he has held since 2017. Prior to joining the Bills, Beane served in the personnel department of the Carolina Panthers organization from 1998 to 2016.

== Career ==
=== Carolina Panthers ===
Before joining the Bills, Beane held various roles of increasing responsibility with the Carolina Panthers. He turned down a journalism job for a low-paying internship with the Panthers and eventually rose to become the team's assistant general manager. In Carolina, Beane worked alongside general managers Marty Hurney and Dave Gettleman, and with head coaches Dom Capers, George Seifert, John Fox, and Ron Rivera.

During his 18-year tenure the Panthers appeared in Super Bowls XXXVIII and 50, but lost to the New England Patriots and Denver Broncos respectively.

=== Buffalo Bills ===
On May 9, 2017, Beane was hired by Buffalo as the general manager. After the Bills fired previous general manager Doug Whaley, they opted to hire someone familiar to head coach Sean McDermott due to conflicts within the previous head coach-GM tandems under Whaley.

Within the first season, Beane traded away many of the players Whaley had signed, drafted, or extended, including receiver Sammy Watkins, cornerback Ronald Darby, linebacker Reggie Ragland, and defensive tackle Marcell Dareus. Though Beane arguably had his sights on a long-term rebuild while purging unfavorable contracts for the Bills, some sports commentators criticized his tactics. In 2017, Beane's first season with the team, the Bills ended their 17-year playoff drought. Beane has since drafted players such as quarterback Josh Allen, linebacker Tremaine Edmunds, and defensive tackle Ed Oliver and brought in numerous offensive free agents with the team's new cap space. On December 10, 2020, Beane signed a contract extension through 2025. On June 23, 2023, Beane signed another contract extension through 2027.

On January 19, 2026, following the firing of Sean McDermott, Beane was promoted to President of Football Operations alongside his General Manager duties.

== Personal life ==
Beane was a high school quarterback before injuries cut short his athletic career. He graduated from UNC Wilmington with a degree in communications.

Beane is married with two sons. His parents are Bob and Cindy Beane.
