= Ed Oliver (American football) =

American football player (born 1997)

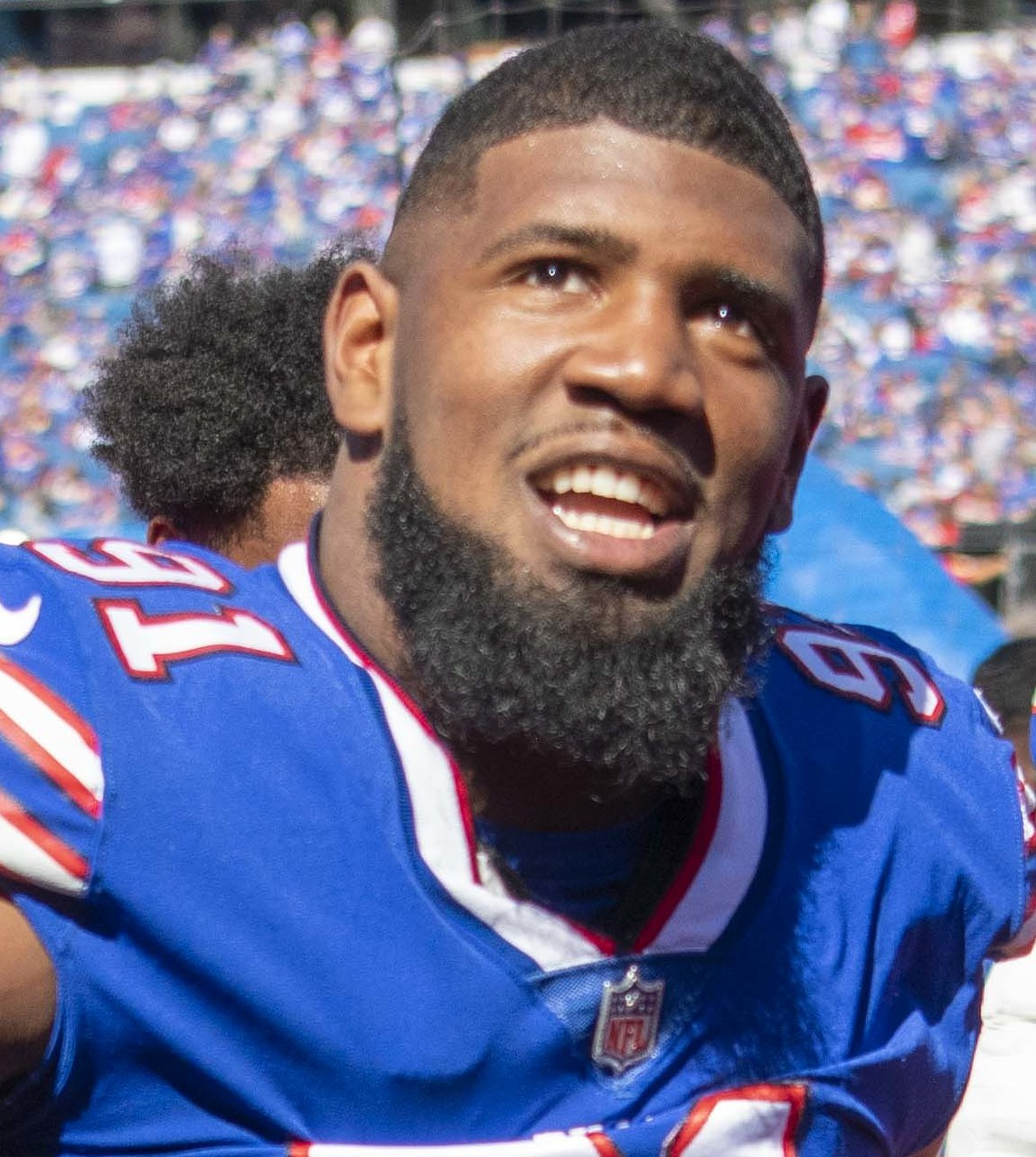
- Oliver with the Buffalo Bills in 2021

No. 91 – Buffalo Bills
- Position: Defensive tackle
- Roster status: Active

Personal information
- Born: December 12, 1997 (age 28); Marksville, Louisiana, U.S.
- Listed height: 6 ft 2 in (1.88 m)
- Listed weight: 290 lb (132 kg)

Career information
- High school: Westfield (Houston, Texas)
- College: Houston (2016–2018)
- NFL draft: 2019: 1st round, 9th overall pick

Career history
- Buffalo Bills (2019–present)

Awards and highlights
- PFWA All-Rookie Team (2019); Outland Trophy (2017); Bill Willis Trophy (2016); 2× Consensus All-American (2017, 2018); First-team All-American (2016); AAC Defensive Player of the Year (2017); AAC Rookie of the Year (2016); 3× First-team All-AAC (2016–2018)

Career NFL statistics as of Week 11, 2026
- Total tackles: 258
- Sacks: 30.5
- Forced fumbles: 9
- Fumble recoveries: 2
- Pass deflections: 14
- Interceptions: 1
- Stats at Pro Football Reference

Edward Oliver (born December 12, 1997) is an American professional football defensive tackle for the Buffalo Bills of the National Football League (NFL). He played college football for the Houston Cougars, winning numerous awards, and was selected by the Bills in the first round of the 2019 NFL draft.

== Early life ==
Oliver attended Westfield High School in Houston. Oliver had 83 tackles, nine sacks and an interception as a senior and 84 tackles and seven sacks as a junior. In Oliver's senior season, Westfield went 11–1 into the 2015 UIL playoffs, where they lost 28–21 in the Area final to later state runner-up Austin Lake Travis.

Oliver was rated as a consensus five-star recruit and was ranked among the top players in his class. Receiving offers from a multitude of powerhouse schools, including Alabama, Florida, LSU, Oklahoma, Texas, and Texas A&M, Oliver chose to play college football at the University of Houston, becoming the first recruit rated by ESPN as a five-star to commit to a school outside the Power Five conferences.

== College career ==
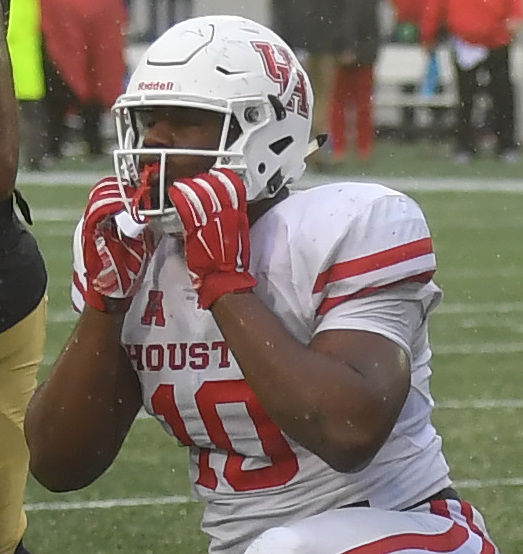
Oliver with Houston in 2016

Oliver became an immediate starter his true freshman year at Houston in 2016. He started all 12 games during the regular season, recording 60 tackles and five sacks. He was named the winner of the Bill Willis Trophy, becoming the first freshman to win the award.

In 2017, Oliver's sophomore season, he was selected to the Walter Camp All-America first team and won the Outland Trophy, presented to the nation's top interior lineman.

Following his junior year in 2018, Oliver decided to forgo his senior year and enter the 2019 NFL draft.

== Professional career ==
Pre-draft measurables
Height	Weight	Arm length	Hand span	Wingspan	40-yard dash	10-yard split	20-yard split	20-yard shuttle	Three-cone drill	Vertical jump	Broad jump	Bench press	Wonderlic
6 ft 1 7/8 in (1.88 m)	287 lb (130 kg)	31 3/4 in (0.81 m)	9 1/4 in (0.23 m)	6 ft 5 3/8 in (1.97 m)	4.73 s	1.63 s	2.78 s	4.22 s	7.15 s	36.0 in (0.91 m)	10 ft 0 in (3.05 m)	32 reps	20
All values from NFL Combine/Pro Day

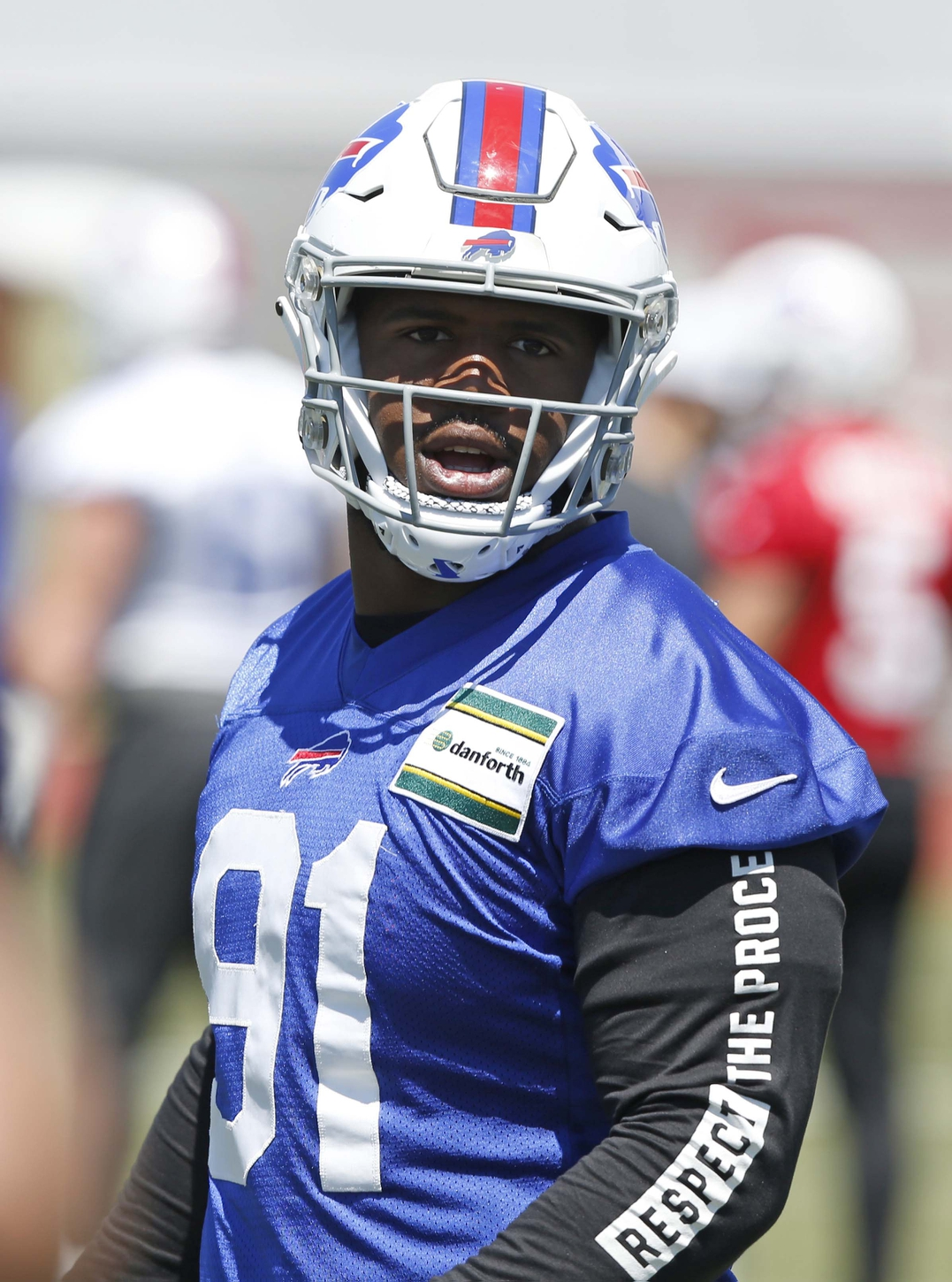
Oliver at training camp in 2019

On March 5, 2018, before the start of his junior year, Oliver announced that he already intended to forgo his final year of eligibility and enter the 2019 NFL draft. In May 2018, ESPN draft analyst Todd McShay projected Oliver to go No. 1 overall in the 2019 draft.

=== 2019 ===
Oliver was selected by the Buffalo Bills in the first round with the ninth overall selection in the 2019 NFL draft. On May 9, 2019, Oliver signed his four-year rookie contract, worth a fully guaranteed $19.7 million.

In week 7 against the Miami Dolphins, Oliver recorded his first career sack on Ryan Fitzpatrick in the 31–21 win. In week 13 against the Dallas Cowboys on Thanksgiving Day, Oliver recorded two sacks on quarterback Dak Prescott, including a strip sack recovered by teammate Trent Murphy that set up a Bills touchdown in the 26–15 win. Oliver was named the Pepsi NFL Rookie of the Week for his performance in Dallas. He finished his rookie season with five sacks and 43 combined tackles. He was named to the PFWA All-Rookie Team.

=== 2020 ===
In Week 2 against the Dolphins, Oliver recorded another season opening sack on Ryan Fitzpatrick during the 31–28 win. He finished the season with 33 tackles, three sacks and a forced fumble through 16 starts.

=== 2021 ===
Oliver entered the 2021 season as a starting defensive tackle. He started all 17 games, recording 41 tackles, four sacks and a forced fumble.

=== 2022 ===
On April 26, 2022, the Bills picked up the fifth-year option on Oliver's contract. In Week 12, Oliver had six tackles, two for a loss, a safety, a forced fumble and recovery in a 28–25 win over the Lions, earning AFC Defensive Player of the Week. He made 13 starts and appearances in the 2022 season. He recorded 2.5 sacks, one safety, 34 total tackles (20 solo), three passes defended, and one forced fumble. In the Bills' Divisional Round win over the Dolphins, Oliver had one sack.

=== 2023 ===
On June 3, 2023, Oliver signed a four-year, $68 million contract extension with the Bills. He made 16 starts and appearances in the 2023 season, contributing a career-high 9.5 sacks, 51 total tackles (34 solo), one interception, three passes defended, and one forced fumble. He notably out-performed New York Jets defensive tackle Quinnen Williams, who was voted to the Pro Bowl but only tallied 5.5 sacks (3.5 at the time the initial roster was announced).

=== 2024 ===
Oliver started all 14 games he played in for Buffalo during the 2024 season. He recorded a team-leading three forced fumbles, three sacks, and 29 combined tackles.

=== 2025 ===
Oliver began the 2025 season as a Bills starter, recording three sacks, 12 combined tackles, and one forced fumble in three starts; an ankle injury caused him to miss four early-season contests. In Week 8 against the Carolina Panthers, Oliver suffered a torn biceps tendon in his left arm, causing him to be placed on injured reserve. On December 31, 2025, it was announced that Oliver had undergone a minimally invasive surgery to repair damage to his meniscus that he suffered during his rehabilitation. On January 16, 2026, Oliver was activated from injured reserve ahead of Buffalo's divisional round matchup against the Denver Broncos.

== Career statistics ==
=== NFL ===
Legend
	Led the league
**Bold**	Career high

==== Regular season ====
Year	Team	Games		Tackles							Interceptions						Fumbles				
Year	Team	GP	GS	Cmb	Solo	Ast	TFL	QBH	Sck	Sfty	PD	Int	Yds	Y/I	Lng	TD	FF	FR	Yds	Y/R	TD
2019	BUF	16	7	43	24	**19**	5	8	5.0	0	2	0	0	—	0	0	1	0	0	—	0
2020	BUF	16	16	33	23	10	6	6	3.0	0	**3**	0	0	—	0	0	1	0	0	—	0
2021	BUF	17	17	41	29	12	10	14	4.0	0	**3**	0	0	—	0	0	1	0	0	—	0
2022	BUF	13	13	34	20	14	9	14	2.5	**1**	**3**	0	0	—	0	0	1	**1**	0	**0.0**	0
2023	BUF	16	16	**51**	**34**	17	**14**	**16**	**9.5**	0	**3**	**1**	0	**0.0**	0	0	1	0	0	—	0
2024	BUF	14	14	29	14	15	5	13	3.0	0	0	0	0	—	0	0	**3**	0	0	—	0
2025	BUF	3	3	12	10	2	7	5	3.0	0	0	0	0	—	0	0	1	0	0	—	0
2026	BUF	7	7	15	6	9	2	11	0.5	0	0	0	0	—	0	0	0	1	0	—	0
Career		102	93	258	160	98	58	87	30.5	1	14	1	0	0.0	0	0	9	2	0	0.0	0

==== Postseason ====
Year	Team	Games		Tackles							Interceptions						Fumbles				
Year	Team	GP	GS	Cmb	Solo	Ast	TFL	QBH	Sck	Sfty	PD	Int	Yds	Y/I	Lng	TD	FF	FR	Yds	Y/R	TD
2019	BUF	1	0	4	0	4	0	0	0.0	0	0	0	0	—	0	0	0	0	0	—	0
2020	BUF	3	3	**8**	**5**	3	1	0	0.0	0	0	0	0	—	0	0	0	0	0	—	0
2021	BUF	2	2	5	4	1	**2**	2	**1.0**	0	0	0	0	—	0	0	0	0	0	—	0
2022	BUF	2	1	4	2	2	1	**3**	**1.0**	0	0	0	0	—	0	0	0	0	0	—	0
2023	BUF	2	2	2	1	1	1	**3**	0.0	0	0	0	0	—	0	0	0	0	0	—	0
2024	BUF	3	3	7	2	**5**	1	2	0.0	0	0	0	0	—	0	0	0	**1**	0	—	0
2025	BUF	1	0	0	0	0	0	0	0.0	0	0	0	0	—	0	0	0	0	0	—	0
Career		14	11	30	14	16	6	10	2.0	0	0	0	0	—	0	0	0	1	0	—	0

=== College ===
Year	Team	Position	GP	Tackles					Interceptions					Fumbles			
Year	Team	Position	GP	Solo	Ast	Total	Loss	Sack	Int	Yards	Avg	TD	PD	FR	Yards	TD	FF
2016	Houston	DT	12	46	19	65	22.0	5.0	0	0	0.0	0	6	0	0	0	2
2017	Houston	DT	12	47	26	73	16.5	5.5	0	0	0.0	0	3	1	0	0	2
2018	Houston	DT	8	29	25	54	14.5	3.0	0	0	0.0	0	2	0	0	0	1

== Personal life ==
A native of Houston, Texas, Oliver is an avid horseback rider.

On May 16, 2020, Oliver was arrested in Houston on charges of driving while intoxicated and unlawfully carrying a weapon and held in Montgomery County Jail before posting bail the next day. The charges were dismissed in July due to lack of evidence. Later reflecting on the arrest, Oliver stated that he felt "violated" and recorded a 0.00% on his breathalyzer test.

In August 2026, it was announced by the Buffalo Bills and local authorities that Oliver's 2-year-old son had drowned in a pool at the family's Texas home and died on June 28. The incident was declared an accident. The announcement came after Tony Farmer, an independent podcaster, leaked the matter despite the Bills organization and Oliver's family keeping it private.
