= Jackson Hawes =

American football player (born 2000)

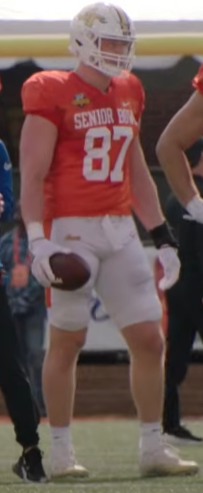
- Hawes at the 2025 Senior Bowl

No. 85 – Buffalo Bills
- Position: Tight end
- Roster status: Active

Personal information
- Born: December 6, 2000 (age 25)
- Listed height: 6 ft 4 in (1.93 m)
- Listed weight: 253 lb (115 kg)

Career information
- High school: Highland (Salt Lake City, UT)
- College: Yale (2019–2023); Georgia Tech (2024)
- NFL draft: 2025: 5th round, 173rd overall pick

Career history
- Buffalo Bills (2025–present)

Awards and highlights
- 2× Second-team All-Ivy League (2022, 2023)

Career NFL statistics as of Week 9, 2026
- Receptions: 18
- Receiving yards: 202
- Receiving touchdowns: 3
- Stats at Pro Football Reference

Jackson Hawes (born December 6, 2000) is an American professional football tight end for the Buffalo Bills of the National Football League (NFL). He played college football for the Yale Bulldogs and Georgia Tech Yellow Jackets. Hawes was selected by the Bills in the fifth round of the 2025 NFL draft.

== Early life ==
Hawes attended Highland High School in Salt Lake City, Utah. Rated as a three-star recruit, he committed to play college football for the Yale Bulldogs.

== College career ==
=== Yale ===
In five seasons at Yale from 2019 through 2023, Hawes appeared in 29 games, where he hauled in 35 receptions for 371 yards and six touchdowns. He was named second team all-Ivy League twice, in 2022 and 2023. After the 2023 season, Hawes entered his name into the NCAA transfer portal.

=== Georgia Tech ===
Hawes transferred to play for the Georgia Tech Yellow Jackets.

== Professional career ==
Hawes accepted an invite to play in the Reese's Senior Bowl during his 2024 college season.

Pre-draft measurables
Height	Weight	Arm length	Hand span	Wingspan	40-yard dash	10-yard split	20-yard split	20-yard shuttle	Vertical jump	Broad jump	Bench press
6 ft 4 1/2 in (1.94 m)	253 lb (115 kg)	32 1/8 in (0.82 m)	9 1/8 in (0.23 m)	6 ft 7 in (2.01 m)	4.82 s	1.56 s	2.79 s	4.40 s	34.5 in (0.88 m)	10 ft 1 in (3.07 m)	16 reps
All values from NFL Combine

Hawes was selected in the fifth round, with the 173rd pick of the 2025 NFL draft by the Buffalo Bills. He played behind veterans Dawson Knox and Dalton Kincaid in his rookie year, but was utilized heavily by the Bills in both blocking and pass-catching situations. Pro Football Focus gave Hawes an 83.1 rating, the second highest among all rookie offensive players in 2025.
