= Daryl Porter Jr. (American football) =

American football player (born 2002)

Daryl Porter
Profile
- Position: Cornerback

Personal information
- Born: February 3, 2002 (age 24); Fort Lauderdale, Florida, U.S.
- Listed height: 5 ft 10 in (1.78 m)
- Listed weight: 185 lb (84 kg)

Career information
- High school: American Heritage (Plantation, Florida)
- College: West Virginia (2020–2021); Miami (FL) (2022–2024)
- NFL draft: 2025: undrafted

Career history
- Buffalo Bills (2025)*; Pittsburgh Steelers (2025); Buffalo Bills (2025)*; Pittsburgh Steelers (2026)*
- * Offseason or practice squad member only

Career NFL statistics as of 2025
- Games played: 1
- Stats at Pro Football Reference

Daryl Porter Jr. (born February 3, 2002) is an American professional football cornerback. He played college football for the West Virginia Mountaineers and Miami Hurricanes. Porter is the son of former NFL safety Daryl Porter.

== Early life ==
Porter II attended American Heritage in Plantation, Florida and committed to play college football for West Virginia.

== College career ==
=== West Virginia ===
In his first two seasons with the Mountaineers in 2020 and 2021, Porter appeared in 19 games and totaled one interception, six pass breakups, 46 tackles and one tackle for loss. After the season, Porter entered his name into the NCAA transfer portal.

=== Miami (FL) ===
Porter transferred to play for the Miami Hurricanes. He finished his collegiate career with one interception, 18 pass breakups, 108 tackles and 3 tackles for loss.

== Professional career ==
Pre-draft measurables
Height	Weight	Arm length	Hand span	Wingspan	40-yard dash	10-yard split	20-yard split	20-yard shuttle	Three-cone drill	Vertical jump	Bench press
5 ft 11 in (1.80 m)	184 lb (83 kg)	31 in (0.79 m)	8 1/2 in (0.22 m)	6 ft 2 1/2 in (1.89 m)	4.58 s	1.67 s	2.70 s	4.53 s	7.15 s	36.0 in (0.91 m)	12 reps
All values from Pro Day

=== Buffalo Bills ===
On May 9, 2025, Porter signed with the Buffalo Bills as an undrafted free agent after going unselected in the 2025 NFL draft. He was waived by the Bills on July 28.

=== Pittsburgh Steelers ===
On August 5, 2025, Porter Jr. signed with the Pittsburgh Steelers. He was waived on August 25, and re-signed to the practice squad. Porter made his NFL debut on December 21 against the Detroit Lions. He was released by the Steelers on December 29.

=== Buffalo Bills (second stint) ===
On January 7, 2026, Porter was signed to the Buffalo Bills' practice squad. On January 19, he signed a reserve/futures contract with Buffalo. Porter was waived by the Bills on June 1.

=== Pittsburgh Steelers (second stint) ===
Om June 11, 2026, Porter signed with the Pittsburgh Steelers on a one-year contract. On August 28, he was waived by the Steelers.

== Personal life ==
Porter's father is former Boston College and Buffalo Bills safety Daryl Porter. Additionally, Porter is a former high school classmate of current Denver Bronco Patrick Surtain II and current Los Angeles Charger Oronde Gadsden II.
