= Daryl Porter (safety) =

American football player (born 1974)

No. 38, 22, 44
- Position: Safety

Personal information
- Born: January 16, 1974 (age 52); Fort Lauderdale, Florida, U.S.
- Listed height: 5 ft 9 in (1.75 m)
- Listed weight: 187 lb (85 kg)

Career information
- High school: St. Thomas Aquinas (Fort Lauderdale)
- College: Boston College
- NFL draft: 1997: 6th round, 186th overall pick

Career history
- Pittsburgh Steelers (1997)*; Detroit Lions (1997); Pittsburgh Steelers (1998)*; Buffalo Bills (1998–2000); Miami Dolphins (2001)*; Tennessee Titans (2001); New England Patriots (2002)*
- * Offseason or practice squad member only

Career NFL statistics
- Tackles: 90
- Interceptions: 1
- Fumble recoveries: 4
- Touchdowns: 1
- Stats at Pro Football Reference

Daryl Maurice Porter (born January 16, 1974) is an American former professional football player who was a safety in the National Football League (NFL). He played college football for the Boston College Eagles and was selected in the sixth round of the 1997 NFL draft with the 186th overall pick. He played five seasons for the Detroit Lions (1997), the Buffalo Bills (1998–2000), and the Tennessee Titans (2001).
