= 2023 Buffalo Bills season =

64th season in franchise history

- Owner: Terry and Kim Pegula
- General manager: Brandon Beane
- Head coach: Sean McDermott
- Offensive coordinator: Ken Dorsey (fired after Week 10); Joe Brady (interim)
- Home stadium: Highmark Stadium

Results
- Record: 11–6
- Division place: 1st AFC East
- Playoffs: Won Wild Card Playoffs (vs. Steelers) 31–17; Lost Divisional Playoffs (vs. Chiefs) 24–27
- All-Pros: CB Taron Johnson (2nd team)
- Pro Bowlers: WR Stefon Diggs; RB James Cook; OT Dion Dawkins

Uniform
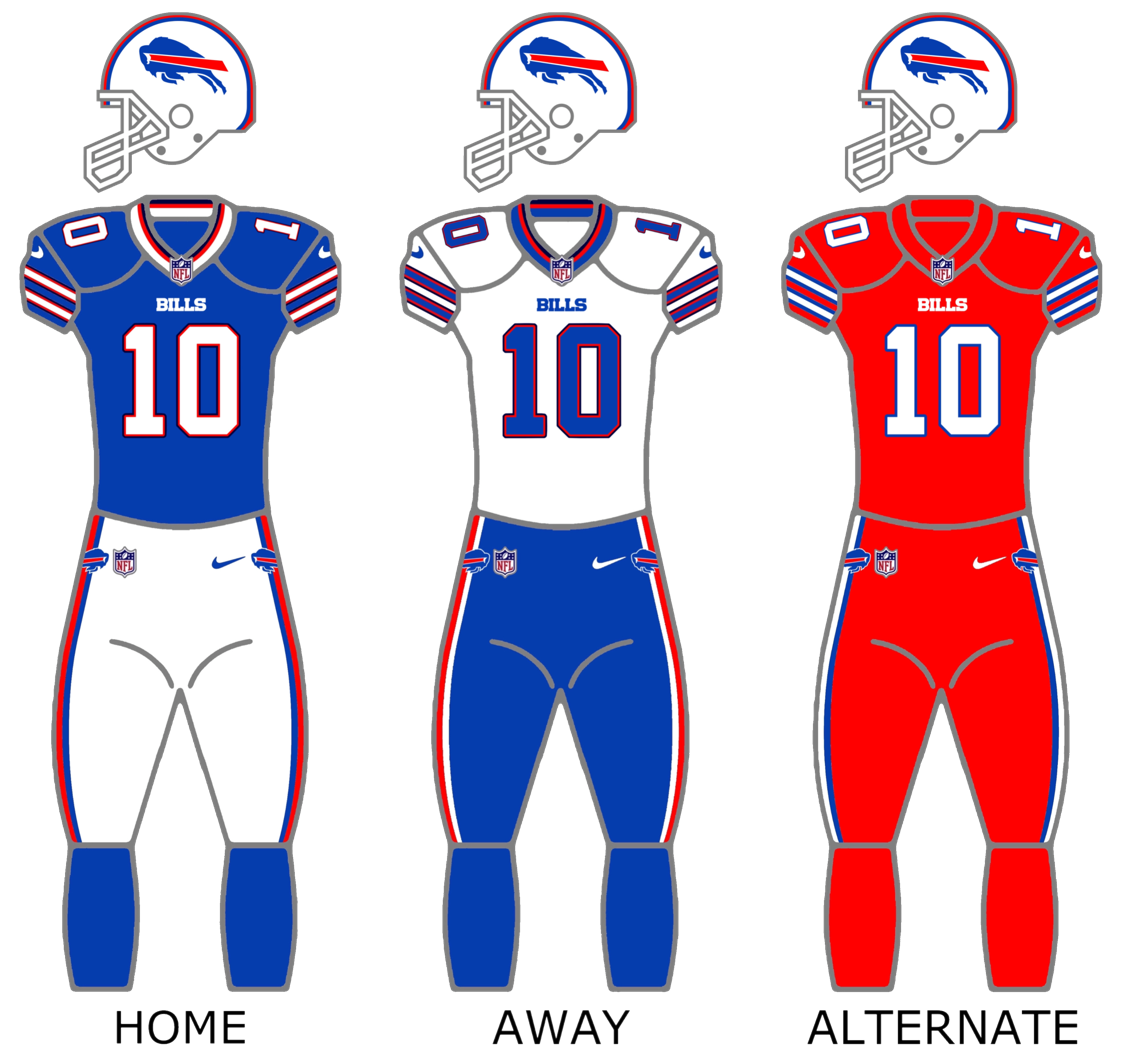

The 2023 season was the Buffalo Bills' 64th season as a franchise, their 54th in the National Football League (NFL), their ninth full season under the ownership of Terry and Kim Pegula, and their seventh under the head coach/general manager tandem of Sean McDermott and Brandon Beane.

Despite a midseason slump that resulted in the team failing to match their franchise-best 13–3 record from the previous season and the firing of offensive coordinator Ken Dorsey after 10 games, the Bills went on a late season surge. They would go from 6–6 at their bye week to winning all five of their final games of the regular season. They clinched their fifth consecutive winning season with a Week 16 victory over the Los Angeles Chargers, and later clinched their fifth consecutive playoff appearance and sixth in seven seasons after the Jacksonville Jaguars lost in Week 18. The Bills defeated the Miami Dolphins later that day to win their fourth consecutive AFC East title, overcoming a three-game Miami lead in the final five weeks. This marked the first time that the Bills had won four consecutive division titles since the 1988–1991 teams.

The Bills would go on defeat the Pittsburgh Steelers 31–17 in the wildcard round, winning a playoff game for the fourth consecutive year. However, the Bills’ late season resurgence came to an end when they were defeated at home by the eventual back-to-back Super Bowl champion, Kansas City Chiefs, 27–24 in the Divisional Round, after an attempted game tying field goal by Tyler Bass went wide right. This marked the Bills' third consecutive loss in the Divisional Round and the third time in four seasons that they were eliminated by the Chiefs.

The Buffalo Bills drew an average home attendance of 69,609 in 9 home games in the 2023 NFL season.

== Transactions ==
=== Arrivals ===
Position	Player	2022 team(s)	Date signed	Notes
S	Zayne Anderson	Kansas City Chiefs	February 17, 2023	2 years / $1.995 million
QB	Kyle Allen	Houston Texans	March 16, 2023	1 year / $1.2325 million
WR	Deonte Harty	New Orleans Saints	March 16, 2023	2 years / $9.5 million
G	Connor McGovern	Dallas Cowboys	March 16, 2023	3 years / $22.35 million
WR	Trent Sherfield	Miami Dolphins	March 20, 2023	1 year / $1.77 million
RB	Damien Harris	New England Patriots	March 21, 2023	1 year / $1.77 million
G	David Edwards	Los Angeles Rams	March 23, 2023	1 year / $1.77 million
S	Taylor Rapp	Los Angeles Rams	March 31, 2023	1 year / $1.77 million
G	Kevin Jarvis	Detroit Lions	April 14, 2023	1 year / $ .75 million
RB	Latavius Murray	New Orleans Saints / Denver Broncos	May 1, 2023	1 year / $1.3175 million
DT	Poona Ford	Seattle Seahawks	May 2, 2023	1 year / $2.25 million
DE	Kameron Cline	Indianapolis Colts	May 5, 2023	1 year / $ .87 million
DE	Shane Ray	Toronto Argonauts	May 13, 2023	1 year / $1.08 million
LB	Travin Howard	Los Angeles Rams	May 13, 2023	1 year / $1.01 million
OT	Brandon Shell	Miami Dolphins	June 1, 2023	1 year / $1.3175 million
WR	Marcell Ateman	Arizona Cardinals	June 1, 2023	1 year / $ .94 million
DE	Leonard Floyd	Los Angeles Rams	June 6, 2023	1 year / $7 million
CB	Cameron Dantzler	Minnesota Vikings	June 7, 2023	1 year / $1.01 million
TE	Nick Guggemos	Green Bay Packers	June 15, 2023	1 year / $ .75 million
RB	Darrynton Evans	Chicago Bears	July 25, 2023	1 year / $ .94 million
TE	Jace Sternberger	Pittsburgh Steelers	July 25, 2023	1 year / $1.01 million
CB	Kyron Brown	Dallas Cowboys / Tennessee Titans	July 28, 2023	1 year / $ .94 million
WR	Andy Isabella	Arizona Cardinals / Baltimore Ravens	July 28, 2023	1 year / $1.08 million
OT	Garrett McGhin	New Jersey Generals / New York Giants	August 21, 2023	1 year / $ .87 million
RB	Ty Johnson	New York Jets	August 21, 2023	1 year / $1.08 million
OT	Germain Ifedi	Atlanta Falcons	August 30, 2023	1 year / $1.165 million
CB	Herb Miller	Cleveland Browns	October 3, 2023	1 year / $ .216 million
CB	Josh Norman	Carolina Panthers	October 10, 2023	1 year / $ .3708 million
DT	Andrew Brown	Arizona Cardinals / Chicago Bears	October 11, 2023	1 year / $ .216 million
RB	Leonard Fournette	Tampa Bay Buccaneers	October 31, 2023	1 year / $ .2898 million
DT	Linval Joseph	Philadelphia Eagles	November 2, 2023	1 year / $1.165 million

=== Departures ===
Position	Player	2023 team	Date signed	Notes
WR	John Brown	—	Free Agent	Contracts expired January 22, 2023
RB	Duke Johnson	—	Free Agent	Contracts expired January 22, 2023
DE	Mike Love	—	Free Agent	Contracts expired January 22, 2023
OT	Justin Murray	Las Vegas Raiders	February 2, 2023	1 year / $1.08 million
RB	Taiwan Jones	New York Giants	August 31, 2023	Contracts expired March 15, 2023
WR	Jake Kumerow	—	Free Agent	Contracts expired March 15, 2023
G	Rodger Saffold	New York Jets	October 31, 2023	Contracts expired March 15, 2023
LB	Tremaine Edmunds	Chicago Bears	March 15, 2023	4 years / $72 million
WR	Isaiah McKenzie	Indianapolis Colts	March 22, 2023	Released March 17, 2023
QB	Case Keenum	Houston Texans	March 17, 2023	2 years / $6.25 million
S	Jaquan Johnson	Las Vegas Raiders	March 21, 2023	1 year / $1.2325 million
RB	Devin Singletary	Houston Texans	March 21, 2023	1 year / $2.75 million
WR	Jamison Crowder	New York Giants	March 23, 2023	1 year / $1.3175 million
TE	Tommy Sweeney	New York Giants	March 23, 2023	1 year / $1.08 million
G	Greg Van Roten	Las Vegas Raiders	May 19, 2023	1 year / $1.6 million
WR	Cole Beasley	New York Giants	July 21, 2023	1 year / $1.165 million
DT	Brandin Bryant	New York Giants	July 24, 2023	Released June 1, 2023
CB	Kyler McMichael	Arizona Cardinals	June 8, 2023	Released June 7, 2023
OT	Bobby Hart	Detroit Lions	August 7, 2023	1 year / $1.165 million
S	Jared Mayden	—	Free Agent	Released August 27, 2023
G	Ike Boettger	Indianapolis Colts	September 12, 2023	Released August 29, 2023
S	Dean Marlowe	Los Angeles Chargers	August 31, 2023	Released August 29, 2023
OT	David Quessenberry	Minnesota Vikings	August 30, 2023	Released August 29, 2023

=== Trades ===
Position	Arrived		From	Date of trade	Departed	
DE	2025 6th-round pick		New York Giants	August 29, 2023	Carlos Basham Jr.	2025 7th-round pick
CB	Rasul Douglas	2024 5th-round pick	Green Bay Packers	October 31, 2023	2024 3rd-round pick (91st overall; Ty'Ron Hopper)	

=== Draft ===
2023 Buffalo Bills draft selections
Round	Selection	Player	Position	College	Notes
1	25	Dalton Kincaid	TE	Utah	From Jaguars (Note: The Bills traded first- and fourth-round selections (27th and 130th overall) to the Jacksonville Jaguars in exchange for a first-round selection (25th overall).)
1	27	Traded to the Jacksonville Jaguars			
2	59	O'Cyrus Torrence	G	Florida	
3	91	Dorian Williams	LB	Tulane	
4	130	Traded to the Jacksonville Jaguars			
5	137	Traded to the Washington Commanders (Note: The Bills traded a fifth-round selection (137th overall) to the Washington Commanders in exchange for fifth- and sixth-round selections (150th and 215th overall).)			From Cardinals (Note: The Bills traded G Cody Ford to the Arizona Cardinals in exchange for a fifth-round selection (137th overall).)
5	150	Justin Shorter	WR	Florida	From Commanders
5	162	Traded to the Indianapolis Colts (Note: The Bills traded a fifth-round selection (162nd overall) and RB Zack Moss to the Indianapolis Colts in exchange for RB Nyheim Hines.)			
6	205	Traded to the Houston Texans (Note: The Bills traded a sixth-round selection (205th overall) to the Houston Texans in exchange for seventh- (230th overall) and 2024 sixth-round selections.)			
6	215	Traded to the Los Angeles Rams (Note: The Bills traded a sixth-round selection (215th overall) to the Los Angeles Rams in exchange for seventh- (252nd overall) and 2024 sixth-round selections.)			From Commanders
7	230	Nick Broeker	G	Ole Miss	From Texans
7	245	Traded to the Atlanta Falcons (Note: The Bills traded a seventh-round selection (245th overall) to the Atlanta Falcons in exchange for S Dean Marlowe.)			
7	252	Alex Austin	CB	Oregon State	From Rams

Draft trades

=== Undrafted free agents ===
2023 Buffalo Bills undrafted free agents
Name	Position	College	Ref.
D. J. Dale	DT	Alabama	
Richard Gouraige	OT	Florida	
Jordan Mims	RB	Fresno State	
Isaiah Bowser	RB	Central Florida	
Joel Wilson	TE	Central Michigan	
Braydon Johnson	WR	Oklahoma State	
Tyrell Shavers	WR	San Diego State	
Bryan Thompson	WR	Arizona State	
Jalen Wayne	WR	South Alabama	
DaShaun White	LB	Oklahoma	

== Staff ==
2023 Buffalo Bills staff
Front office: Owner/CEO/president – Terry Pegula; Owner – Kim Pegula; General manager – Brandon Beane; Assistant general manager – Brian Gaine; Director of player personnel – Terrance Gray; Senior advisor to the GM/football operations – Jim Overdorf; Senior executive – Lake Dawson; Senior personnel advisor – Malik Boyd; Co-director of pro scouting/team advances – Chris Marrow; Co-director of pro scouting/free agency – Curtis Rukavina; Vice president of football administration – Kevin Meganck; Director of football operations – Brendan Rowe; Senior personnel executive – Matt Bazirgan; Director of team administration – Matt Worswick; Head coaches: Head coach – Sean McDermott; Assistant head coach/defensive line – Eric Washington; Offensive coaches: Offensive coordinator – Ken Dorsey; fired after Week 10; Interim offensive coordinator/quarterbacks – Joe Brady; Assistant quarterbacks/game management – Marc Lubick; Running backs – Kelly Skipper; Wide receivers – Adam Henry; Tight ends – Rob Boras; Offensive line – Aaron Kromer; Offensive assistant/offensive line – Austin Gund; Senior offensive assistant – Mike Shula; Offensive quality control – Kyle Shurmur; Offensive aide – DJ Mangas	Defensive coaches: Senior defensive assistant – Al Holcomb; Assistant defensive line – Marcus West; Linebackers – Bobby Babich; Defensive backs/passing game coordinator – John Butler; Safeties – Joe Danna; Defensive quality control – Jaylon Finner; Special teams coaches: Special teams coordinator – Matthew Smiley; Assistant special teams – Cory Harkey; Strength and conditioning: Head strength and conditioning – Eric Ciano; Assistant strength and conditioning – Will Greenberg; Strength and conditioning assistant – Nick Lacy; Assistant strength and conditioning – Hal Luther; Strength and conditioning assistant – Jason Oszvart

== Final roster ==
2023 Buffalo Bills roster
Quarterbacks (QB): 17 Josh Allen; 9 Kyle Allen; Running backs (RB): 4 James Cook; 41 Reggie Gilliam; 26 Ty Johnson; 28 Latavius Murray; Wide receivers (WR): 13 Gabe Davis; 14 Stefon Diggs; 11 Deonte Harty; 10 Khalil Shakir; 16 Trent Sherfield; Tight ends (TE): 86 Dalton Kincaid; 88 Dawson Knox; 85 Quintin Morris	Offensive linemen (OL): 70 Alec Anderson G; 71 Ryan Bates C; 79 Spencer Brown T; 73 Dion Dawkins T; 76 David Edwards G; 66 Connor McGovern G; 60 Mitch Morse C; 64 O'Cyrus Torrence G; 74 Ryan Van Demark T; Defensive linemen (DL): 57 A. J. Epenesa DE; 56 Leonard Floyd DE; 98 Poona Ford DT; 59 Kingsley Jonathan DE; 92 DaQuan Jones DT; 93 Linval Joseph DT; 90 Shaq Lawson DE; 40 Von Miller DE; 91 Ed Oliver DT; 50 Greg Rousseau DE; 99 Tim Settle DT	Linebackers (LB): 43 Terrel Bernard MLB; 25 Tyrel Dodson OLB; 44 Tyler Matakevich MLB; 54 Baylon Spector OLB; 42 Dorian Williams OLB; Defensive backs (DB): 47 Christian Benford CB; 31 Rasul Douglas CB; 24 Kaiir Elam CB; 3 Damar Hamlin FS; 23 Micah Hyde FS; 30 Dane Jackson CB; 7 Taron Johnson CB; 39 Cam Lewis CB; 33 Siran Neal CB; 21 Jordan Poyer SS; 20 Taylor Rapp FS/SS; Special teams (ST): 2 Tyler Bass K; 69 Reid Ferguson LS; 8 Sam Martin P	Practice squad: 51 Eli Ankou DT; 94 Andrew Brown DT; 32 Kyron Brown CB; 6 Shane Buechele QB; 96 Kameron Cline DT; 75 Richard Gouraige T; 68 Germain Ifedi T; 46 Ja'Marcus Ingram CB; 87 Andy Isabella WR; 63 Kevin Jarvis G; 52 A. J. Klein MLB; 62 Greg Mancz C; 83 Tre' McKitty TE; 29 Josh Norman CB; 80 Tyrell Shavers WR; 89 Bryan Thompson WR; Reserve: 84 Zach Davidson TE (IR); 72 Tommy Doyle T (IR); 22 Damien Harris RB (IR); 0 Nyheim Hines RB (NF-Inj.); 58 Matt Milano OLB (IR); 97 Jordan Phillips DT (IR); 18 Justin Shorter WR (IR); 27 Tre'Davious White CB (IR); Rookies in italics 53 active, 8 reserve, 16 practice squad

== Preseason ==
Week	Date	Opponent	Result	Record	Venue	Recap
1	August 12	Indianapolis Colts	W 23–19	1–0	Highmark Stadium	Recap
2	August 19	at Pittsburgh Steelers	L 15–27	1–1	Acrisure Stadium	Recap
3	August 26	at Chicago Bears	W 24–21	2–1	Soldier Field	Recap

== Regular season ==
=== Schedule ===
Week	Date	Opponent	Result	Record	Venue	Recap
1	September 11	at **New York Jets**	**L** 16–22 (OT)	0–1	MetLife Stadium	Recap
2	September 17	Las Vegas Raiders	**W** 38–10	1–1	Highmark Stadium	Recap
3	September 24	at Washington Commanders	**W** 37–3	2–1	FedExField	Recap
4	October 1	**Miami Dolphins**	**W** 48–20	3–1	Highmark Stadium	Recap
5	October 8	Jacksonville Jaguars	**L** 20–25	3–2	(United Kingdom) Tottenham Hotspur Stadium (London)	Recap
6	October 15	New York Giants	**W** 14–9	4–2	Highmark Stadium	Recap
7	October 22	at **New England Patriots**	**L** 25–29	4–3	Gillette Stadium	Recap
8	October 26	Tampa Bay Buccaneers	**W** 24–18	5–3	Highmark Stadium	Recap
9	November 5	at Cincinnati Bengals	**L** 18–24	5–4	Paycor Stadium	Recap
10	November 13	Denver Broncos	**L** 22–24	5–5	Highmark Stadium	Recap
11	November 19	**New York Jets**	**W** 32–6	6–5	Highmark Stadium	Recap
12	November 26	at Philadelphia Eagles	**L** 34–37 (OT)	6–6	Lincoln Financial Field	Recap
13	Bye					
14	December 10	at Kansas City Chiefs	**W** 20–17	7–6	Arrowhead Stadium	Recap
15	December 17	Dallas Cowboys	**W** 31–10	8–6	Highmark Stadium	Recap
16	December 23	at Los Angeles Chargers	**W** 24–22	9–6	SoFi Stadium	Recap
17	December 31	**New England Patriots**	**W** 27–21	10–6	Highmark Stadium	Recap
18	January 7	at **Miami Dolphins**	**W** 21–14	11–6	Hard Rock Stadium	Recap

Note: Intra-division opponents are in bold text.

=== Game summaries ===
==== Week 1: at New York Jets ====
Week 1: Buffalo Bills at New York Jets – Game summary

Quarter	1	2	3	4	OT	Total
Bills	3	10	0	3	0	**16**
**Jets**	0	3	3	10	6	**22**

at MetLife Stadium, East Rutherford, New Jersey

- Date: September 11
- Game time: 8:15 p.m. EDT
- Game weather: Rain, 72 °F (22 °C)
- Game attendance: 83,345
- Referee: Carl Cheffers
- TV announcers (ESPN/ABC): Joe Buck, Troy Aikman and Lisa Salters
- Recap, Game Book

Game information

**First quarter**

- BUF – Tyler Bass 40-yard field goal, 3:05. Bills 3–0. **Drive: 11 plays, 55 yards, 6:19.**

**Second quarter**

- NYJ – Greg Zuerlein 26-yard field goal, 10:35. Tied 3–3. **Drive: 5 plays, 88 yards, 2:27.**
- BUF – Stefon Diggs 5-yard pass from Josh Allen (Tyler Bass kick), 4:43. Bills 10–3. **Drive: 11 plays, 75 yards, 5:52.**
- BUF – Tyler Bass 34-yard field goal, 0:17. Bills 13–3. **Drive: 9 plays, 34 yards, 2:51.**

**Third quarter**

- NYJ – Greg Zuerlein 43-yard field goal, 8:59. Bills 13–6. **Drive: 12 plays, 50 yards, 6:01.**

**Fourth quarter**

- NYJ – Garrett Wilson 3-yard pass from Zach Wilson (Greg Zuerlein kick), 4:55. Tied 13–13. **Drive: 8 plays, 57 yards, 4:48.**
- NYJ – Greg Zuerlein 30-yard field goal, 1:48. Jets 16–13. **Drive: 8 plays, 15 yards, 3:03.**
- BUF – Tyler Bass 50-yard field goal, 0:02. Tied 16–16. **Drive: 9 plays, 42 yards, 1:46.**

**Overtime**

- NYJ – Xavier Gipson 65-yard punt return, 9:02. Jets 22–16.

**Top passers**

- BUF – Josh Allen – 29/41, 236 yards, TD, 3 INT
- NYJ – Zach Wilson – 14/21, 140 yards, TD, INT

**Top rushers**

- BUF – James Cook – 12 rushes, 46 yards
- NYJ – Breece Hall – 10 rushes, 127 yards

**Top receivers**

- BUF – Stefon Diggs – 10 receptions, 102 yards, TD
- NYJ – Allen Lazard – 2 receptions, 46 yards

In the first quarter, new Jets quarterback Aaron Rodgers suffered a season-ending Achilles tendon rupture after being sacked by Bills linebacker Leonard Floyd on the Jets fourth play from scrimmage. The Bills led 13–3 at halftime, but quarterback Josh Allen struggled, throwing three interceptions and losing a fumble to tie his career-high record in turnovers. After receiving the ball to start overtime, Buffalo's offense went three-and-out, and their ensuing punt was returned by the Jets' Xavier Gipson for a game-winning touchdown.

With the loss, the Bills fell to 0–1. This is their second straight loss to the Jets at MetLife Stadium.

==== Week 2: vs. Las Vegas Raiders ====
Week 2: Las Vegas Raiders at Buffalo Bills – Game summary

Quarter	1	2	3	4	Total
Raiders	7	3	0	0	**10**
**Bills**	7	14	7	10	**38**

at Highmark Stadium, Orchard Park, New York

- Date: September 17
- Game time: 1:00 p.m. EDT
- Game weather: Partly cloudy, 70 °F (21 °C)
- Game attendance: 70,772
- Referee: Craig Wrolstad
- TV announcers (CBS): Kevin Harlan, Trent Green and Melanie Collins
- Recap, Game Book

Game information

**First quarter**

- LV – Davante Adams 16-yard pass from Jimmy Garoppolo (Daniel Carlson kick), 12:16. Raiders 7–0. **Drive: 5 plays, 75 yards, 2:44.**
- BUF – Latavius Murray 4-yard run (Tyler Bass kick), 4:19. Tied 7–7. **Drive: 7 plays, 28 yards, 3:58.**

**Second quarter**

- BUF – Dawson Knox 2-yard pass from Josh Allen (Tyler Bass kick), 12:10. Bills 14–7. **Drive: 11 plays, 84 yards, 6:06.**
- LV – Daniel Carlson 47-yard field goal, 6:48. Bills 14–10. **Drive: 10 plays, 46 yards, 5:22.**
- BUF – Khalil Shakir 11-yard pass from Josh Allen (Tyler Bass kick), 0:18. Bills 21–10. **Drive: 8 plays, 57 yards, 1:29.**

**Third quarter**

- BUF – Gabe Davis 2-yard pass from Josh Allen (Tyler Bass kick), 5:59. Bills 28–10. **Drive: 15 plays, 75 yards, 9:01.**

**Fourth quarter**

- BUF – Tyler Bass 29-yard field goal, 14:56. Bills 31–10. **Drive: 9 plays, 37 yards, 3:53.**
- BUF – Damien Harris 1-yard run (Tyler Bass kick), 5:08. Bills 38–10. **Drive: 11 plays, 95 yards, 7:32.**

**Top passers**

- LV – Jimmy Garoppolo – 16/24, 185 yards, TD, 2 INT
- BUF – Josh Allen – 31/37, 274 yards, 3 TD

**Top rushers**

- LV – Tre Tucker – 1 rush, 34 yards
- BUF – James Cook – 17 rushes, 123 yards

**Top receivers**

- LV – Davante Adams – 6 receptions, 84 yards, TD
- BUF – Gabe Davis – 6 receptions, 92 yards, TD

==== Week 3: at Washington Commanders ====
Week 3: Buffalo Bills at Washington Commanders – Game summary

Quarter	1	2	3	4	Total
**Bills**	10	6	0	21	**37**
Commanders	0	0	0	3	**3**

at FedExField, Landover, Maryland

- Date: September 24
- Game time: 1:00 p.m. EDT
- Game weather: Rain, 65 °F (18 °C)
- Game attendance: 64,291
- Referee: Land Clark
- TV announcers (CBS): Andrew Catalon, Tiki Barber, Matt Ryan and AJ Ross
- Recap, Game Book

Game information

**First quarter**

- BUF – Tyler Bass 36-yard field goal, 9:29. Bills 3–0. **Drive: 11 plays, 57 yards, 5:31.**
- BUF – Gabe Davis 35-yard pass from Josh Allen (Tyler Bass kick), 0:41. Bills 10–0. **Drive: 1 play, 35 yards, 0:06.**

**Second quarter**

- BUF – Tyler Bass 54-yard field goal, 1:55. Bills 13–0. **Drive: 15 plays, 62 yards, 9:47.**
- BUF – Tyler Bass 32-yard field goal, 0:19. Bills 16–0. **Drive: 6 plays, 19 yards, 0:56.**

**Third quarter**

- No scoring plays.

**Fourth quarter**

- BUF – Josh Allen 10-yard run (Tyler Bass kick), 10:37. Bills 23–0. **Drive: 6 plays, 31 yards, 3:28.**
- BUF – A. J. Epenesa 32-yard interception return (Tyler Bass kick), 10:01. Bills 30–0.
- BUF – Latavius Murray 2-yard run (Tyler Bass kick), 2:15. Bills 37–0. **Drive: 9 plays, 64 yards, 5:57.**
- WAS – Joey Slye 51-yard field goal, 0:46. Bills 37–3. **Drive: 8 plays, 42 yards, 1:29.**

**Top passers**

- BUF – Josh Allen – 20/32, 218 yards, TD, INT
- WAS – Sam Howell – 19/29, 170 yards, 4 INT

**Top rushers**

- BUF – James Cook – 15 rushes, 98 yards
- WAS – Brian Robinson Jr. – 10 rushes, 70 yards

**Top receivers**

- BUF – Stefon Diggs – 8 receptions, 111 yards
- WAS – Curtis Samuel – 2 receptions, 54 yards

The Bills defense dominated the Commanders, sacking quarterback Sam Howell nine times in the game and forcing five turnovers en route to a 37–3 victory.

==== Week 4: vs. Miami Dolphins ====
Week 4: Miami Dolphins at Buffalo Bills – Game summary

Quarter	1	2	3	4	Total
Dolphins	7	7	6	0	**20**
**Bills**	14	17	10	7	**48**

at Highmark Stadium, Orchard Park, New York

- Date: October 1
- Game time: 1:00 p.m. EDT
- Game weather: Sunny, fair, 70 °F (21 °C)
- Game attendance: 70,881
- Referee: Adrian Hill
- TV announcers (CBS): Jim Nantz, Tony Romo and Tracy Wolfson
- Recap, Game Book

Game information

**First quarter**

- BUF – Gabe Davis 18-yard pass from Josh Allen (Tyler Bass kick), 10:41. Bills 7–0. **Drive: 8 plays, 75 yards, 4:19.**
- MIA – De'Von Achane 3-yard run (Jason Sanders kick), 6:30. Tied 7–7. **Drive: 7 plays, 77 yards, 4:11.**
- BUF – James Cook 1-yard run (Tyler Bass kick), 1:10. Bills 14–7. **Drive: 10 plays, 80 yards, 5:20.**

**Second quarter**

- MIA – De'Von Achane 10-yard run (Jason Sanders kick), 12:47. Tied 14–14. **Drive: 7 plays, 70 yards, 3:23.**
- BUF – Stefon Diggs 11-yard pass from Josh Allen (Tyler Bass kick), 10:02. Bills 21–14. **Drive: 5 plays, 79 yards, 2:45.**
- BUF – Stefon Diggs 55-yard pass from Josh Allen (Tyler Bass kick), 2:58. Bills 28–14. **Drive: 2 plays, 59 yards, 0:53.**
- BUF – Tyler Bass 53-yard field goal, 1:39. Bills 31–14. **Drive: 4 plays, −4 yards, 0:35.**

**Third quarter**

- MIA – Braxton Berrios 11-yard pass from Tua Tagovailoa (pass failed), 9:30. Bills 31–20. **Drive: 11 plays, 75 yards, 5:30.**
- BUF – Tyler Bass 33-yard field goal, 5:21. Bills 34–20. **Drive: 7 plays, 60 yards, 4:09.**
- BUF – Stefon Diggs 13-yard pass from Josh Allen (Tyler Bass kick), 3:00. Bills 41–20. **Drive: 4 plays, 25 yards, 2:03.**

**Fourth quarter**

- BUF – Josh Allen 11-yard run (Tyler Bass kick), 14:55. Bills 48–20. **Drive: 2 plays, 45 yards, 0:44.**

**Top passers**

- MIA – Tua Tagovailoa – 25/35, 282 yards, TD, INT
- BUF – Josh Allen – 21/25, 320 yards, 4 TD

**Top rushers**

- MIA – De'Von Achane – 8 rushes, 101 yards, 2 TD
- BUF – Latavius Murray – 4 rushes, 32 yards

**Top receivers**

- MIA – Tyreek Hill – 3 receptions, 58 yards
- BUF – Stefon Diggs – 6 receptions, 120 yards, 3 TD

Despite a close first quarter, the Bills dominated a Miami Dolphins team that had scored 70 points the previous week against the Denver Broncos, limiting Tua Tagovailoa and the Miami offense to three touchdowns while Josh Allen attained his first career perfect passer rating and scored five overall touchdowns. With the 48–20 win, Buffalo improved to 3–1 and took the division lead.

Safety Damar Hamlin made his first regular season appearance since his cardiac arrest in Week 17 of the previous season. He was met with a warm welcome and resounding cheers by the Buffalo crowd. Unfortunately, star cornerback Tre'Davious White suffered an Achilles tendon injury and was carted off the field in the third quarter.

==== Week 5: vs. Jacksonville Jaguars ====
NFL London games

Week 5: Jacksonville Jaguars at Buffalo Bills – Game summary

Quarter	1	2	3	4	Total
**Jaguars**	11	0	0	14	**25**
Bills	0	7	0	13	**20**

at Tottenham Hotspur Stadium, London, England

- Date: October 8
- Game time: 2:30 p.m. BST/9:30 a.m. EDT
- Game weather: Partly cloudy, 75 °F (24 °C)
- Game attendance: 61,273
- Referee: Shawn Smith
- TV announcers (WUTV/NFLN): Rich Eisen, Kurt Warner and Jamie Erdahl
- Recap, Game Book

Game information

**First quarter**

- JAX – Zay Jones 6-yard pass from Trevor Lawrence (Travis Etienne run), 6:59. Jaguars 8–0. **Drive: 9 plays, 73 yards, 4:10.**
- JAX – Brandon McManus 44-yard field goal, 1:13. Jaguars 11–0. **Drive: 9 plays, 44 yards, 3:50.**

**Second quarter**

- BUF – Stefon Diggs 15-yard pass from Josh Allen (Tyler Bass kick), 1:14. Jaguars 11–7. **Drive: 11 plays, 86 yards, 4:30.**

**Third quarter**

- No scoring plays.

**Fourth quarter**

- JAX – Travis Etienne 6-yard run (Brandon McManus kick), 7:44. Jaguars 18–7. **Drive: 10 plays, 93 yards, 5:22.**
- BUF – Gabe Davis 19-yard pass from Josh Allen (pass failed), 4:03. Jaguars 18–13. **Drive: 9 plays, 75 yards, 3:41.**
- JAX – Travis Etienne 35-yard run (Brandon McManus kick), 2:56. Jaguars 25–13. **Drive: 5 plays, 75 yards, 1:07.**
- BUF – Josh Allen 3-yard run (Tyler Bass kick), 2:11. Jaguars 25–20. **Drive: 4 plays, 75 yards, 0:45.**

**Top passers**

- JAX – Trevor Lawrence – 25/37, 315 yards, TD
- BUF – Josh Allen – 27/40, 359 yards, 2 TD, INT

**Top rushers**

- JAX – Travis Etienne – 26 rushes, 136 yards, 2 TD
- BUF – Josh Allen – 4 rushes, 14 yards, TD

**Top receivers**

- JAX – Calvin Ridley – 7 receptions, 122 yards
- BUF – Stefon Diggs – 8 receptions, 121 yards, TD

With the loss in London, not only did Buffalo fall to 3–2, but defensive starters DaQuan Jones and Matt Milano both suffered injuries that required surgery. They both joined White on injured reserve.

==== Week 6: vs. New York Giants ====
Week 6: New York Giants at Buffalo Bills – Game summary

Quarter	1	2	3	4	Total
Giants	3	3	0	3	**9**
**Bills**	0	0	0	14	**14**

at Highmark Stadium, Orchard Park, New York

- Date: October 15
- Game time: 8:20 p.m. EDT
- Game weather: Cloudy, 46 °F (8 °C)
- Game attendance: 70,515
- Referee: Tra Blake
- TV announcers (NBC): Mike Tirico, Cris Collinsworth and Melissa Stark
- Recap, Game Book

Game information

**First quarter**

- NYG – Graham Gano 29-yard field goal, 3:19. Giants 3–0. **Drive: 12 plays, 45 yards, 6:01.**

**Second quarter**

- NYG – Graham Gano 43-yard field goal, 5:08. Giants 6–0. **Drive: 9 plays, 34 yards, 4:36.**

**Third quarter**

- No scoring plays.

**Fourth quarter**

- BUF – Deonte Harty 3-yard pass from Josh Allen (Tyler Bass kick), 14:54. Bills 7–6. **Drive: 17 plays, 89 yards, 9:58.**
- NYG – Graham Gano 29-yard field goal, 10:35. Giants 9–7. **Drive: 9 plays, 79 yards, 4:19.**
- BUF – Quintin Morris 15-yard pass from Josh Allen (Tyler Bass kick), 3:48. Bills 14–9. **Drive: 12 plays, 75 yards, 6:47.**

**Top passers**

- NYG – Tyrod Taylor – 24/36, 200 yards
- BUF – Josh Allen – 19/30, 169 yards, 2 TD, INT

**Top rushers**

- NYG – Saquon Barkley – 24 rushes, 93 yards
- BUF – James Cook – 14 rushes, 71 yards

**Top receivers**

- NYG – Darius Slayton – 4 receptions, 69 yards
- BUF – Stefon Diggs – 10 receptions, 100 yards

Former Bills quarterback Tyrod Taylor, who notably helped break the Bills' 17-year playoff drought in his final season with the team, started for the Giants in place of Daniel Jones, making this his first start against the Bills. In addition, former offensive coordinator Brian Daboll, now head coach of the Giants, and other former Bills such as Isaiah Hodgins, Boogie Basham, and Matt Breida participated in their first game against Buffalo since their departure. The Bills won the game after trailing 6–0 going into the fourth quarter, marking the first time since 1987 that the Bills had won a game after being shutout for the first three quarters of a game.

==== Week 7: at New England Patriots ====
Week 7: Buffalo Bills at New England Patriots – Game summary

Quarter	1	2	3	4	Total
Bills	0	3	7	15	**25**
**Patriots**	10	3	3	13	**29**

at Gillette Stadium, Foxborough, Massachusetts

- Date: October 22
- Game time: 1:00 p.m. EDT
- Game weather: Partly cloudy, 55 °F (13 °C)
- Game attendance: 64,628
- Referee: Clete Blakeman
- TV announcers (CBS): Ian Eagle, Charles Davis and Evan Washburn
- Recap, Game Book

Game information

**First quarter**

- NE – Chad Ryland 30-yard field goal, 3:19. Patriots 3–0. **Drive: 9 plays, 63 yards, 4:58.**
- NE – Ezekiel Elliott 2-yard run (Chad Ryland kick), 6:58. Patriots 10–0. **Drive: 7 plays, 45 yards, 2:49.**

**Second quarter**

- BUF – Tyler Bass 36-yard field goal, 14:49. Patriots 10–3. **Drive: 13 plays, 57 yards, 7:09.**
- NE – Chad Ryland 24-yard field goal, 7:36. Patriots 13–3. **Drive: 5 plays, 40 yards, 2:44.**

**Third quarter**

- BUF – James Cook 8-yard pass from Josh Allen (Tyler Bass kick), 9:53. Patriots 13–10. **Drive: 10 plays, 81 yards, 5:07.**
- NE – Chad Ryland 49-yard field goal, 4:30. Patriots 16–10. **Drive: 9 plays, 44 yards, 5:23.**

**Fourth quarter**

- NE – Kendrick Bourne 4-yard pass from Mac Jones (run failed), 7:36. Patriots 22–10. **Drive: 9 plays, 66 yards, 6:07.**
- BUF – Stefon Diggs 25-yard pass from Josh Allen (Tyler Bass kick), 5:32. Patriots 22–17. **Drive: 5 plays, 75 yards, 2:04.**
- BUF – Josh Allen 1-yard run (Josh Allen–Dawson Knox pass), 1:58. Bills 25–22. **Drive: 8 plays, 29 yards, 2:58.**
- NE – Mike Gesicki 1-yard pass from Mac Jones (Chad Ryland kick), 0:12. Patriots 29–25. **Drive: 8 plays, 75 yards, 1:46.**

**Top passers**

- BUF – Josh Allen – 27/41, 265 yards, 2 TD, INT
- NE – Mac Jones – 25/30, 272 yards, 2 TD

**Top rushers**

- BUF – James Cook – 13 rushes, 56 yards
- NE – Rhamondre Stevenson – 9 rushes, 34 yards

**Top receivers**

- BUF – Dalton Kincaid – 8 receptions, 75 yards
- NE – Kendrick Bourne – 6 receptions, 63 yards, TD

==== Week 8: vs. Tampa Bay Buccaneers ====
Week 8: Tampa Bay Buccaneers at Buffalo Bills – Game summary

Quarter	1	2	3	4	Total
Buccaneers	0	10	0	8	**18**
**Bills**	3	14	7	0	**24**

at Highmark Stadium, Orchard Park, New York

- Date: October 26
- Game time: 8:15 p.m. EDT
- Game weather: Partly cloudy, 66 °F (19 °C)
- Game attendance: 70,416
- Referee: Scott Novak
- TV announcers (WKBW/Prime Video): Al Michaels, Kirk Herbstreit and Kaylee Hartung
- Recap, Game Book

Game information

**First quarter**

- BUF – Tyler Bass 37-yard field goal, 8:04. Bills 3–0. **Drive: 10 plays, 77 yards, 4:31.**

**Second quarter**

- BUF – Josh Allen 13-yard run (Tyler Bass kick), 11:03. Bills 10–0. **Drive: 5 plays, 23 yards, 2:45.**
- TB – Chase McLaughlin 57-yard field goal, 7:40. Bills 10–3. **Drive: 8 plays, 36 yards, 3:23.**
- TB – Chris Godwin 3-yard pass from Baker Mayfield (Chase McLaughlin kick), 6:46. Tied 10–10. **Drive: 2 plays, 23 yards, 0:47.**
- BUF – Dalton Kincaid 22-yard pass from Josh Allen (Tyler Bass kick), 2:40. Bills 17–10. **Drive: 9 plays, 75 yards, 4:06.**

**Third quarter**

- BUF – Gabe Davis 4-yard pass from Josh Allen (Tyler Bass kick), 10:40. Bills 24–10. **Drive: 9 plays, 75 yards, 4:20.**

**Fourth quarter**

- TB – Mike Evans 24-yard pass from Baker Mayfield (Baker Mayfield–Cade Otton pass), 2:44. Bills 24–18. **Drive: 17 plays, 92 yards, 7:21.**

**Top passers**

- TB – Baker Mayfield – 25/42, 237 yards, 2 TD
- BUF – Josh Allen – 31/40, 324 yards, 2 TD, INT

**Top rushers**

- TB – Rachaad White – 9 rushes, 39 yards
- BUF – James Cook – 14 rushes, 67 yards

**Top receivers**

- TB – Rachaad White – 7 receptions, 70 yards
- BUF – Khalil Shakir – 6 receptions, 92 yards

==== Week 9: at Cincinnati Bengals ====
Week 9: Buffalo Bills at Cincinnati Bengals – Game summary

Quarter	1	2	3	4	Total
Bills	7	0	3	8	**18**
**Bengals**	14	7	0	3	**24**

at Paycor Stadium, Cincinnati, Ohio

- Date: November 5
- Game time: 8:20 p.m. EST
- Game weather: Mostly clear, 51 °F (11 °C)
- Game attendance: 66,965
- Referee: Alex Kemp
- TV announcers (NBC): Mike Tirico, Cris Collinsworth and Melissa Stark
- Recap, Game Book

Game information

**First quarter**

- CIN – Irv Smith Jr. 7-yard pass from Joe Burrow (Evan McPherson kick), 9:18. Bengals 7–0. **Drive: 9 plays, 76 yards, 5:42.**
- BUF – Josh Allen 2-yard run (Tyler Bass kick), 6:03. Tied 7–7. **Drive: 7 plays, 85 yards, 3:15.**
- CIN – Joe Mixon 2-yard run (Evan McPherson kick), 0:35. Bengals 14–7. **Drive: 11 plays, 69 yards, 5:28.**

**Second quarter**

- CIN – Drew Sample 22-yard pass from Joe Burrow (Evan McPherson kick), 1:37. Bengals 21–7. **Drive: 7 plays, 45 yards, 1:52.**

**Third quarter**

- BUF – Tyler Bass 34-yard field goal, 10:21. Bengals 21–10. **Drive: 11 plays, 58 yards, 4:39.**

**Fourth quarter**

- CIN – Evan McPherson 20-yard field goal, 8:08. Bengals 24–10. **Drive: 12 plays, 85 yards, 5:10.**
- BUF – Stefon Diggs 17-yard pass from Josh Allen (Josh Allen-Stefon Diggs pass), 3:32. Bengals 24–18. **Drive: 12 plays, 75 yards, 4:36.**

**Top passers**

- BUF – Josh Allen – 26/38, 258 yards, TD, INT
- CIN – Joe Burrow – 31/44, 348 yards, 2 TD

**Top rushers**

- BUF – Josh Allen – 8 rushes, 44 yards, TD
- CIN – Joe Mixon – 14 rushes, 37 yards, TD

**Top receivers**

- BUF – Stefon Diggs – 6 receptions, 86 yards, TD
- CIN – Tee Higgins – 8 receptions, 110 yards

In a rematch of the 2022 AFC Divisional Round, the struggling Bills lost by six to a Bengals team that was beginning to heat up after a terrible 1–3 start to their season. Cincinnati struck first on their opening drive on a touchdown pass from quarterback Joe Burrow to tight end Irv Smith Jr. Buffalo would respond with a two-yard touchdown run by Allen on their opening drive, but the Bengals would then score 14 unanswered points (which came on a Joe Mixon touchdown run and a Burrow touchdown pass to tight end Drew Sample) before halftime. In the second half, Buffalo's injury-riddled defense kept Cincinnati's potent offense in check, but the Buffalo offense struggled to get going and could not fully erase the deficit. Buffalo would eventually cut Cincy's lead to six points on an 17-yard Allen touchdown pass to star wide receiver Stefon Diggs (and a successful two-point conversion from Allen to Diggs), but the Bengals ran out the clock on their next possession. Before the game, Damar Hamlin walked on the field and reflected on where he was when collapsed and suffered cardiac arrest earlier in the year.

==== Week 10: vs. Denver Broncos ====
Week 10: Denver Broncos at Buffalo Bills – Game summary

Quarter	1	2	3	4	Total
**Broncos**	3	12	0	9	**24**
Bills	0	8	7	7	**22**

at Highmark Stadium, Orchard Park, New York

- Date: November 13
- Game time: 8:15 p.m. EST
- Game weather: Mostly cloudy, 49 °F (9 °C)
- Game attendance: 70,318
- Referee: Bill Vinovich
- TV announcers (ESPN): Joe Buck, Troy Aikman and Lisa Salters
- Recap, Game Book

Game information

**First quarter**

- DEN – Wil Lutz 40-yard field goal, 12:39. Broncos 3–0. **Drive: 4 plays, 6 yards, 2:13.**

**Second quarter**

- DEN – Courtland Sutton 7-yard pass from Russell Wilson (kick failed), 3:36. Broncos 9–0. **Drive: 8 plays, 81 yards, 3:41.**
- BUF – Dalton Kincaid 22-yard pass from Josh Allen (Josh Allen–Gabe Davis pass), 7:17. Broncos 9–8. **Drive: 7 plays, 52 yards, 3:53.**
- DEN – Wil Lutz 49-yard field goal, 0:45. Broncos 12–8. **Drive: 8 plays, 45 yards, 2:51.**
- DEN – Wil Lutz 40-yard field goal, 0:00. Broncos 15–8. **Drive: 4 plays, 9 yards, 0:37.**

**Third quarter**

- BUF – Latavius Murray 3-yard run (Tyler Bass kick), 6:42. Tied 15–15. **Drive: 7 plays, 54 yards, 3:09.**

**Fourth quarter**

- DEN – Javonte Williams 3-yard pass from Russell Wilson (run failed), 5:06. Broncos 21–15. **Drive: 12 plays, 54 yards, 7:16.**
- BUF – Josh Allen 6-yard run (Tyler Bass kick), 1:55. Bills 22–21. **Drive: 6 plays, 75 yards, 3:11.**
- DEN – Wil Lutz 36-yard field goal, 0:00. Broncos 24–22. **Drive: 10 plays, 57 yards, 1:55.**

**Top passers**

- DEN – Russell Wilson – 24/29, 193 yards, 2 TD
- BUF – Josh Allen – 15/26, 177 yards, TD, 2 INT

**Top rushers**

- DEN – Javonte Williams – 21 rushes, 79 yards
- BUF – James Cook – 27 rushes, 85 yards

**Top receivers**

- DEN – Courtland Sutton – 8 receptions, 53 yards, TD
- BUF – Dalton Kincaid – 5 receptions, 51 yards, TD

Buffalo's playoff hopes took another big hit in a loss to the visiting Denver Broncos on Monday Night Football. In the game, Buffalo committed four turnovers, though its defense limited the Broncos to six points off the four turnovers. Despite taking the lead within the two-minute warning, the Bills were ultimately undone by two untimely penalties during Denver's final drive to score the game-winning field goal. Buffalo cornerback Taron Johnson was flagged for pass interference while defending a Russell Wilson pass to Jerry Jeudy, thus setting up a Denver first down at Buffalo's 17-yard line and 29 seconds left in the game. After Denver burned more clock with a series of quarterback kneels and forced Buffalo to burn its final timeouts, Broncos kicker Wil Lutz, who had missed an extra point attempt earlier in the game and had another one aborted due to a fumbled snap, missed a 41-yard field goal attempt, but it was nullified after Buffalo was flagged for having twelve men on the field during the attempt. Lutz drilled his second attempt as time expired to hand a heartbreaking defeat to Buffalo. The following day, the Bills fired offensive coordinator Ken Dorsey and named Joe Brady the interim offensive coordinator.

==== Week 11: vs. New York Jets ====
Week 11: New York Jets at Buffalo Bills – Game summary

Quarter	1	2	3	4	Total
Jets	0	6	0	0	**6**
**Bills**	6	10	13	3	**32**

at Highmark Stadium, Orchard Park, New York

- Date: November 19
- Game time: 4:25 p.m. EST
- Game weather: Clear, 40 °F (4 °C)
- Game attendance: 70,603
- Referee: Alan Eck
- TV announcers (CBS): Jim Nantz, Tony Romo and Tracy Wolfson
- Recap, Game Book

Game information

**First quarter**

- BUF – Tyler Bass 48-yard field goal, 13:31. Bills 3–0. **Drive: 4 plays, 9 yards, 1:22.**
- BUF – Tyler Bass 30-yard field goal, 5:56. Bills 6–0. **Drive: 14 plays, 58 yards, 6:05.**

**Second quarter**

- BUF – Tyler Bass 33-yard field goal, 11:26. Bills 9–0. **Drive: 9 plays, 65 yards, 5:52.**
- BUF – James Cook 5-yard pass from Josh Allen (Tyler Bass kick), 3:03. Bills 16–0. **Drive: 5 plays, 23 yards, 2:16.**
- NYJ – Breece Hall 9-yard pass from Zach Wilson (pass failed), 0:45. Bills 16–6. **Drive: 11 plays, 84 yards, 2:18.**

**Third quarter**

- BUF – Ty Johnson 28-yard pass from Josh Allen (kick failed), 10:34. Bills 22–6. **Drive: 8 plays, 75 yards, 4:26.**
- BUF – Khalil Shakir 81-yard pass from Josh Allen (Tyler Bass kick), 6:29. Bills 29–6. **Drive: 2 plays, 86 yards, 0:55.**

**Fourth quarter**

- BUF – Tyler Bass 50-yard field goal, 5:16. Bills 32–6. **Drive: 7 plays, 22 yards, 4:17.**

**Top passers**

- NYJ – Zach Wilson – 7/15, 81 yards, TD, INT
- BUF – Josh Allen – 20/32, 275 yards, 3 TD, INT

**Top rushers**

- NYJ – Breece Hall – 10 rushes, 23 yards
- BUF – James Cook – 17 rushes, 73 yards

**Top receivers**

- NYJ – Breece Hall – 5 receptions, 50 yards, TD
- BUF – Dalton Kincaid – 6 receptions, 46 yards

In what was seen as a potential must-win for both teams' playoff hopes, the Bills hosted the Zach Wilson-led Jets in a rematch of their Week 1 MNF clash. In the Bills' first game since the midseason firing of offensive coordinator Ken Dorsey, the Bills offense looked largely back to form with 130 yards on the ground as well as three air touchdowns from Allen, his most since the Week 4 home blowout of Miami. Finishing with 275 passing yards and three touchdowns, Allen saw his nineteenth consecutive game throwing a touchdown, breaking hall-of-famer Jim Kelly's 1986–87 record of eighteen consecutive games with a touchdown throw. Allen did throw an interception for the seventh consecutive game this season, but in this game it occurred on an unsuccessful Hail Mary attempt as time expired in the first half. Allen's third-quarter 81-yard bomb to Khalil Shakir was Buffalo's longest play from scrimmage this season.

The Bills stole a possession on the first play of the game when the full-back Reggie Gilliam forced a fumble by rookie Jets kick returner Xavier Gipson that was recovered by Quintin Morris to set up a Bass field goal, giving the Bills an early 3–0 lead. Overall, the Bills forced four turnovers, three of them being credited to recent trade acquisition Rasul Douglas, who recovered a fumble in between his two interceptions. Save for one touchdown drive shortly before halftime, the Jets were listless offensively and were limited to 155 net offensive yards. Wilson (who finished the day with a QBR of 3.8) was benched in favor of backup Tim Boyle, who completed 7 of 14 passes for 33 yards and an interception. The Jets would announce the next morning that Boyle would be the team's starter moving forward.

For the first time since 1987, the Bills defense did not allow a third down conversion, forcing the Jets to go 0-for-11 (0-for-10 at Indianapolis on 12/13/87).

==== Week 12: at Philadelphia Eagles ====
Week 12: Buffalo Bills at Philadelphia Eagles – Game summary

Quarter	1	2	3	4	OT	Total
Bills	0	17	7	7	3	**34**
**Eagles**	7	0	7	17	6	**37**

at Lincoln Financial Field, Philadelphia, Pennsylvania

- Date: November 26
- Game time: 4:25 p.m. EST
- Game weather: Rain, 47 °F (8 °C)
- Game attendance: 69,879
- Referee: Shawn Hochuli
- TV announcers (CBS): Jim Nantz, Tony Romo and Tracy Wolfson
- Recap, Game Book

Game information

**First quarter**

- PHI – Jalen Hurts 1-yard run (Jake Elliott kick), 1:06. Eagles 7–0. **Drive: 10 plays, 73 yards, 5:31.**

**Second quarter**

- BUF – Tyler Bass 48-yard field goal, 11:23. Eagles 7–3. **Drive: 11 plays, 45 yards, 4:43.**
- BUF – Josh Allen 9-yard run (Tyler Bass kick), 8:34. Bills 10–7. **Drive: 4 plays, 29 yards, 2:36.**
- BUF – Stefon Diggs 13-yard pass from Josh Allen (Tyler Bass kick), 0:12. Bills 17–7. **Drive: 5 plays, 36 yards, 0:52.**

**Third quarter**

- PHI – A. J. Brown 3-yard pass from Jalen Hurts (Jake Elliott kick), 7:13. Bills 17–14. **Drive: 6 plays, 62 yards, 3:19.**
- BUF – Josh Allen 16-yard run (Tyler Bass kick), 1:40. Bills 24–14. **Drive: 9 plays, 70 yards, 5:33.**

**Fourth quarter**

- PHI – DeVonta Smith 15-yard pass from Jalen Hurts (Jake Elliott kick), 13:37. Bills 24–21. **Drive: 7 plays, 75 yards, 3:03.**
- PHI – Olamide Zaccheaus 29-yard pass from Jalen Hurts (Jake Elliott kick), 11:07. Eagles 28–24. **Drive: 3 plays, 24 yards, 1:39.**
- BUF – Gabriel Davis 7-yard pass from Josh Allen (Tyler Bass kick), 1:52. Bills 31–28. **Drive: 10 plays, 74 yards, 5:15.**
- PHI – Jake Elliott 59-yard field goal, 0:20. Tied 31–31. **Drive: 9 plays, 34 yards, 1:32.**

**Overtime**

- BUF – Tyler Bass 40-yard field goal, 5:52. Bills 34–31. **Drive: 12 plays, 53 yards, 4:08.**
- PHI – Jalen Hurts 12-yard run, 2:37. Eagles 37–34. **Drive: 9 plays, 75 yards, 3:15.**

**Top passers**

- BUF – Josh Allen – 29/51, 339 yards, 2 TD, INT
- PHI – Jalen Hurts – 18/31, 200 yards, 3 TD, INT

**Top rushers**

- BUF – Josh Allen – 9 rushes, 81 yards, 2 TD
- PHI – D'Andre Swift – 14 rushes, 80 yards

**Top receivers**

- BUF – Gabriel Davis – 6 receptions, 105 yards, TD
- PHI – DeVonta Smith – 7 receptions, 106 yards, TD

After a convincing victory over their division rival, Buffalo suffered a painful overtime defeat at the hands of the defending NFC champion Philadelphia Eagles at Lincoln Financial Field. Even though Buffalo held the lead for more than 30 minutes of game time, won the time of possession battle by nearly 14 minutes of game time, and gained 505 yards compared to the Eagles' 378 yards, the Bills could not put away the Eagles and eventually lost.

After Allen rushed for a 16-yard touchdown to put the Bills up by ten points late in the third quarter, the Eagles scored two quick touchdowns to take a four-point lead early in the fourth quarter, with the second score set up by an Allen interception deep in Bills territory, his eighth consecutive game with an interception. The Bills would retake the lead with 1:52 left in regulation on a 7-yard touchdown pass from Allen to wide receiver Gabe Davis. However, on the ensuing drive, the Eagles drove to fringe field goal range, where kicker Jake Elliott drilled an improbable 59-yard field goal through the rain and wind to tie the game and force overtime. Buffalo won the coin toss and drove to Philadelphia's 22-yard line, but on third-and-six, Davis got separation from cornerback Darius Slay and broke towards the corner of the end zone despite Allen expecting him to run a different route closer to the middle of the field, resulting in an incomplete pass that sailed over Davis' head. Buffalo settled for a 40-yard Tyler Bass field goal as a result, leaving their fate in the hands of their defense. The Eagles subsequently drove quickly into Bills territory, but on a second-and-three, linebacker Tyrel Dodson appeared to force a game-ending fumble on wide receiver A. J. Brown that was recovered by the Buffalo defense. However, the play was controversially ruled an incomplete pass and upheld on review after it was determined that Brown did not get both feet down before Dodson stripped him of the ball. Three plays later, Jalen Hurts capped off the drive with a walk-off 12-yard touchdown run.

==== Week 14: at Kansas City Chiefs ====
Week 14: Buffalo Bills at Kansas City Chiefs – Game summary

Quarter	1	2	3	4	Total
**Bills**	7	7	3	3	**20**
Chiefs	0	7	7	3	**17**

at Arrowhead Stadium, Kansas City, Missouri

- Date: December 10
- Game time: 4:25 p.m. EST/3:25 p.m. CST
- Game weather: 45 °F (7 °C)
- Game attendance: 73,639
- Referee: Carl Cheffers
- TV announcers (CBS): Jim Nantz, Tony Romo and Tracy Wolfson
- Recap, Game Book

Game information

**First quarter**

- BUF – James Cook 25-yard pass from Josh Allen (Tyler Bass kick), 3:43. Bills 7–0. **Drive: 6 plays, 53 yards, 3:24.**

**Second quarter**

- BUF – Josh Allen 6-yard run (Tyler Bass kick), 11:50. Bills 14–0. **Drive: 12 plays, 73 yards, 5:29.**
- KC – Jerick McKinnon 7-yard run (Harrison Butker kick), 1:19. Bills 14–7. **Drive: 9 plays, 52 yards, 2:17.**

**Third quarter**

- BUF – Tyler Bass 31-yard field goal, 8:38. Bills 17–7. **Drive: 10 plays, 62 yards, 6:22.**
- KC – Rashee Rice 4-yard pass from Patrick Mahomes (Harrison Butker kick), 3:30. Bills 17–14. **Drive: 9 plays, 75 yards, 5:08.**

**Fourth quarter**

- KC – Harrison Butker 27-yard field goal, 11:31. Tied 17–17. **Drive: 8 plays, 49 yards, 3:15.**
- BUF – Tyler Bass 39-yard field goal, 1:54. Bills 20–17. **Drive: 12 plays, 48 yards, 5:03.**

**Top passers**

- BUF – Josh Allen – 23/42, 233 yards, TD, INT
- KC – Patrick Mahomes – 25/43, 271 yards, TD, INT

**Top rushers**

- BUF – James Cook – 10 rushes, 58 yards
- KC – Clyde Edwards-Helaire – 11 rushes, 39 yards

**Top receivers**

- BUF – James Cook – 5 receptions, 86 yards, TD
- KC – Travis Kelce – 6 receptions, 83 yards

Prior to this game and during the bye week, the Bills faced some controversy, as edge rusher Von Miller was accused of domestic violence by his pregnant girlfriend and turned himself in to the police in Texas as an arrest warrant was issued. He was released on bond, but was still eligible to play. In addition, a report surfaced that head coach Sean McDermott had cited "the terrorists on Sept. 11, 2001" as an example of "good teamwork" during a team meeting in 2019.

In Buffalo's sixth meeting with Kansas City in the past four seasons (including postseason), the Bills attained an early 14–0 lead, though Kansas City tied the game at 17 in the fourth quarter. After the Bills regained the lead after the two minute warning, the Chiefs drove back into Bills territory, even appearing to score a go-ahead hook and lateral touchdown as Chiefs tight end Travis Kelce lateralled the ball to Kadarius Toney after catching a pass from Patrick Mahomes. However, it was ruled that Toney was offside on the play, negating the score and resulting in a 5-yard penalty. The Bills defense then forced a turnover on downs, securing the team's third straight regular season win over the Chiefs and allowing the it to enter a six-way tie at 7–6 for the two final wild card spots in the AFC playoff picture.

==== Week 15: vs. Dallas Cowboys ====
Week 15: Dallas Cowboys at Buffalo Bills – Game summary

Quarter	1	2	3	4	Total
Cowboys	0	3	0	7	**10**
**Bills**	7	14	3	7	**31**

at Highmark Stadium, Orchard Park, New York

- Date: December 17
- Game time: 4:25 p.m. EST
- Game weather: Rain, 48 °F (9 °C)
- Game attendance: 70,933
- Referee: Craig Wrolstad
- TV announcers (Fox): Kevin Burkhardt, Greg Olsen, Erin Andrews and Tom Rinaldi
- Recap, Game Book

Game information

**First quarter**

- BUF – Latavius Murray 2-yard run (Tyler Bass kick), 8:06. Bills 7–0. **Drive: 12 plays, 75 yards, 6:54.**

**Second quarter**

- BUF – James Cook 18-yard pass from Josh Allen (Tyler Bass kick), 12:52. Bills 14–0. **Drive: 11 plays, 86 yards, 4:44.**
- DAL – Brandon Aubrey 32-yard field goal, 7:13. Bills 14–3. **Drive: 11 plays, 61 yards, 5:39.**
- BUF – Josh Allen 1-yard run (Tyler Bass kick), 1:36. Bills 21–3. **Drive: 11 plays, 76 yards, 5:37.**

**Third quarter**

- BUF – Tyler Bass 23-yard field goal, 2:36. Bills 24–3. **Drive: 15 plays, 65 yards, 8:22.**

**Fourth quarter**

- BUF – James Cook 24-yard run (Tyler Bass kick), 12:30. Bills 31–3. **Drive: 6 plays, 67 yards, 3:05.**
- DAL – CeeDee Lamb 3-yard run (Brandon Aubrey kick), 2:48. Bills 31–10. **Drive: 15 plays, 80 yards, 5:30.**

**Top passers**

- DAL – Dak Prescott – 21/34, 134 yards, INT
- BUF – Josh Allen – 7/15, 94 yards, TD

**Top rushers**

- DAL – Tony Pollard – 11 rushes, 52 yards
- BUF – James Cook – 25 rushes, 179 yards, TD

**Top receivers**

- DAL – CeeDee Lamb – 7 receptions, 53 yards
- BUF – Stefon Diggs – 4 receptions, 48 yards

The Bills utilized a run-heavy offensive attack in light of heavy rainfall during the game, leading to a career day by running back James Cook and largely keeping the ball away from the high-powered Dallas offense. With the win, Buffalo improved to 8–6 and won consecutive games for the first time since weeks 2–4.

==== Week 16: at Los Angeles Chargers ====
Week 16: Buffalo Bills at Los Angeles Chargers – Game summary

Quarter	1	2	3	4	Total
**Bills**	0	14	7	3	**24**
Chargers	3	7	3	9	**22**

at SoFi Stadium, Inglewood, California

- Date: December 23
- Game time: 8:00 p.m. EST/5:00 p.m. PST
- Game weather: Cloudy, 62 °F (17 °C) (retractable roof open)
- Game attendance: 67,678
- Referee: Adrian Hill
- TV announcers (Peacock): Mike Tirico, Cris Collinsworth, and Melissa Stark
- Recap, Game Book

Game information

**First quarter**

- LAC – Cameron Dicker 20-yard field goal, 6:32. Chargers 3–0. **Drive: 14 plays, 90 yards, 6:32.**

**Second quarter**

- LAC – Easton Stick 1-yard run (Cameron Dicker kick), 13:49. Chargers 10–0. **Drive: 4 plays, 27 yards, 1:15.**
- BUF – Gabe Davis 57-yard pass from Josh Allen (Tyler Bass kick), 9:02. Chargers 10–7. **Drive: 1 play, 57 yards, 0:10.**
- BUF – Josh Allen 2-yard run (Tyler Bass kick), 0:38. Bills 14–10. **Drive: 8 plays, 63 yards, 3:51.**

**Third quarter**

- LAC – Cameron Dicker 40-yard field goal, 7:22. Bills 14–13. **Drive: 8 plays, 36 yards, 4:46.**
- BUF – Josh Allen 1-yard run (Tyler Bass kick), 1:28. Bills 21–13. **Drive: 10 plays, 75 yards, 5:54.**

**Fourth quarter**

- LAC – Cameron Dicker 47-yard field goal, 12:36. Bills 21–16. **Drive: 11 plays, 46 yards, 3:52.**
- LAC – Cameron Dicker 45-yard field goal, 7:19. Bills 21–19. **Drive: 6 plays, 21 yards, 1:57.**
- LAC – Cameron Dicker 53-yard field goal, 5:26. Chargers 22–21. **Drive: 4 plays, −3 yards, 1:44.**
- BUF – Tyler Bass 29-yard field goal, 0:28. Bills 24–22. **Drive: 13 plays, 64 yards, 4:58.**

**Top passers**

- BUF – Josh Allen – 15/21, 237 yards, TD, INT
- LAC – Easton Stick – 23/33, 215 yards

**Top rushers**

- BUF – James Cook – 20 rushes, 70 yards
- LAC – Austin Ekeler – 15 rushes, 65 yards

**Top receivers**

- BUF – Gabe Davis – 4 receptions, 130 yards, TD
- LAC – Josh Palmer – 5 receptions, 47 yards

Despite being 12.5-point favorites over a Chargers team that had just fired head coach Brandon Staley and lost quarterback Justin Herbert to a finger injury, the Bills found themselves in a tight game. The Bills were sloppy with the football, committing three turnovers; however, Josh Allen led the Bills on a 13-play, 64-yard drive culminating with Tyler Bass' go-ahead field goal with 28 seconds left. With the win, the Bills improved to 9–6 and clinched their fifth consecutive winning season. This was the first time the Bills defeated the Chargers on the road since 1981, when the Chargers were still in San Diego, and the first time they beat the Chargers in Los Angeles since 1960.

==== Week 17: vs. New England Patriots ====
Week 17: New England Patriots at Buffalo Bills – Game summary

Quarter	1	2	3	4	Total
Patriots	7	7	0	7	**21**
**Bills**	13	7	7	0	**27**

at Highmark Stadium, Orchard Park, New York

- Date: December 31
- Game time: 1:00 p.m. EST
- Game weather: Cloudy, 35 °F (2 °C)
- Game attendance: 70,772
- Referee: Alan Eck
- TV announcers (CBS): Kevin Harlan, Trent Green and Melanie Collins
- Recap, Game Book

Game information

**First quarter**

- NE – Jalen Reagor 98-yard kickoff return (Chad Ryland kick), 14:48. Patriots 7–0. **Drive: 0 plays, 0 yards, 0:12.**
- BUF – Tyler Bass 35-yard field goal, 12:07. Patriots 7–3. **Drive: 4 plays, 4 yards, 0:53.**
- BUF – Josh Allen 1-yard run (Tyler Bass kick), 6:37. Bills 10–7. **Drive: 4 plays, 14 yards, 1:57.**
- BUF – Tyler Bass 24-yard field goal, 2:16. Bills 13–7. **Drive: 7 plays, 24 yards, 3:35.**

**Second quarter**

- BUF – Rasul Douglas 40-yard interception return (Tyler Bass kick), 12:36. Bills 20–7.
- NE – Bailey Zappe 17-yard run (Chad Ryland kick), 9:44. Bills 20–14. **Drive: 6 plays, 75 yards, 2:52.**

**Third quarter**

- BUF – Josh Allen 1-yard run (Tyler Bass kick), 10:42. Bills 27–14. **Drive: 8 plays, 75 yards, 4:18.**

**Fourth quarter**

- NE – Ezekiel Elliott 6-yard run (Chad Ryland kick), 11:01. Bills 27–21. **Drive: 7 plays, 84 yards, 3:09.**

**Top passers**

- NE – Bailey Zappe – 16/26, 209 yards, 3 INT
- BUF – Josh Allen – 15/30, 169 yards, INT

**Top rushers**

- NE – Ezekiel Elliot – 14 rushes, 39 yards, TD
- BUF – James Cook – 16 rushes, 48 yards

**Top receivers**

- NE – Mike Gesicki – 4 receptions, 35 yards
- BUF – Dalton Kincaid – 4 receptions, 87 yards

Despite four takeaways by the Bills' defense (including a pick-six by Rasul Douglas), the Bills once again found themselves in a one-score game in the fourth quarter. Buffalo's defense forced a punt with 5:02 remaining and the Bills were able to run out the clock, improving to 10–6 and setting up a battle for the AFC East in Week 18 with the Miami Dolphins losing to the Baltimore Ravens.

==== Week 18: at Miami Dolphins ====
Week 18: Buffalo Bills at Miami Dolphins – Game summary

Quarter	1	2	3	4	Total
**Bills**	0	7	0	14	**21**
Dolphins	0	14	0	0	**14**

at Hard Rock Stadium, Miami Gardens, Florida

- Date: January 7
- Game time: 8:20 p.m. EST
- Game weather: Partly cloudy, 63 °F (17 °C)
- Game attendance: 66,292
- Referee: Alex Kemp
- TV announcers (NBC): Mike Tirico, Cris Collinsworth and Melissa Stark
- Recap, Game Book

Game information

**First quarter**

- No scoring plays.

**Second quarter**

- MIA – De'Von Achane 25-yard run (Jason Sanders kick), 8:51. Dolphins 7–0. **Drive: 11 plays, 80 yards, 6:19.**
- BUF – Trent Sherfield 6-yard pass from Josh Allen (Tyler Bass kick), 4:31. Tied 7–7. **Drive: 7 plays, 75 yards, 4:20.**
- MIA – Tyreek Hill 3-yard pass from Tua Tagovailoa (Jason Sanders kick), 1:43. Dolphins 14–7. **Drive: 9 plays, 75 yards, 2:48.**

**Third quarter**

- No scoring plays.

**Fourth quarter**

- BUF – Deonte Harty 96-yard punt return (Tyler Bass kick), 13:42. Tied 14–14.
- BUF – Dawson Knox 5-yard pass from Josh Allen (Tyler Bass kick), 7:16. Bills 21–14. **Drive: 8 plays, 74 yards, 4:52.**

**Top passers**

- BUF – Josh Allen – 30/38, 359 yards, 2 TD, 2 INT
- MIA – Tua Tagovailoa – 17/27, 173 yards, TD, 2 INT

**Top rushers**

- BUF – Josh Allen – 15 rushes, 67 yards
- MIA – De'Von Achane – 10 rushes, 56 yards, TD

**Top receivers**

- BUF – Khalil Shakir – 6 receptions, 105 yards
- MIA – Tyreek Hill – 7 receptions, 82 yards, TD

Buffalo was able to move the ball up and down the field all game long, but struggled to score in the first 3 quarters, as Josh Allen threw 2 interceptions and lost a fumble in Dolphins territory and running back Ty Johnson was tackled at the Dolphins' 1-yard line at the end of the first half with Buffalo out of timeouts. However, Deonte Harty's punt return touchdown, the longest in franchise history, and Allen's touchdown pass to Dawson Knox in the 4th quarter gave the Bills the lead, and Buffalo's defense sealed the victory by intercepting Dolphins quarterback Tua Tagovailoa in the final eighty seconds of the game. With the win, Buffalo finished their season with an 11–6 record and won the AFC East for the fourth consecutive season.

=== Standings ===
==== Division ====
AFC East
	W	L	T	PCT	DIV	CONF	PF	PA	STK
^{(2)} Buffalo Bills	11	6	0	.647	4–2	7–5	451	311	W5
^{(6)} Miami Dolphins	11	6	0	.647	4–2	7–5	496	391	L2
New York Jets	7	10	0	.412	2–4	4–8	268	355	W1
New England Patriots	4	13	0	.235	2–4	4–8	236	366	L2

==== Conference ====
AFC
#	Team	Division	W	L	T	PCT	DIV	CONF	SOS	SOV	STK
**Division leaders**
1	Baltimore Ravens	North	13	4	0	.765	3–3	8–4	.543	.529	L1
2 (Note: Buffalo claimed the No. 2 seed over Kansas City based on head-to-head victory.) (Note: Buffalo finished ahead of Miami in the AFC East based on head-to-head sweep.)	Buffalo Bills	East	11	6	0	.647	4–2	7–5	.471	.471	W5
3	Kansas City Chiefs	West	11	6	0	.647	4–2	9–3	.481	.428	W2
4	Houston Texans	South	10	7	0	.588	4–2	7–5	.474	.465	W2
**Wild cards**
5 (Note: Cleveland claimed the No. 5 seed over Miami based on conference record.)	Cleveland Browns	North	11	6	0	.647	3–3	8–4	.536	.513	L1
6	Miami Dolphins	East	11	6	0	.647	4–2	7–5	.450	.358	L2
7	Pittsburgh Steelers	North	10	7	0	.588	5–1	7–5	.540	.571	W3
**Did not qualify for the postseason**
8 (Note: Cincinnati finished ahead of Jacksonville based on head-to-head victory. Division tie break was initially used to eliminate Indianapolis (see below).)	Cincinnati Bengals	North	9	8	0	.529	1–5	4–8	.574	.536	W1
9 (Note: Jacksonville finished ahead of Indianapolis based on head-to-head sweep.)	Jacksonville Jaguars	South	9	8	0	.529	4–2	6–6	.533	.477	L1
10	Indianapolis Colts	South	9	8	0	.529	3–3	7–5	.491	.444	L1
11 (Note: Las Vegas finished ahead of Denver based on head-to-head sweep.)	Las Vegas Raiders	West	8	9	0	.471	4–2	6–6	.488	.426	W1
12	Denver Broncos	West	8	9	0	.471	3–3	5–7	.488	.485	L1
13	New York Jets	East	7	10	0	.412	2–4	4–8	.502	.454	W1
14	Tennessee Titans	South	6	11	0	.353	1–5	4–8	.522	.422	W1
15	Los Angeles Chargers	West	5	12	0	.294	1–5	3–9	.529	.388	L5
16	New England Patriots	East	4	13	0	.235	2–4	4–8	.522	.529	L2
**Tiebreakers** (Note: When breaking ties for three or more teams under the NFL's rules, they are first broken within divisions, then comparing only the highest ranked remaining team from each division.)

== Postseason ==
=== Schedule ===
Round	Date	Opponent (seed)	Result	Record	Venue	Sources
Wild Card	January 15	Pittsburgh Steelers (7)	W 31–17	1–0	Highmark Stadium	Recap
Divisional	January 21	Kansas City Chiefs (3)	L 24–27	1–1	Highmark Stadium	Recap

=== Game summaries ===
==== AFC Wild Card Playoffs: vs. (7) Pittsburgh Steelers ====
AFC Wild Card Playoffs: (7) Pittsburgh Steelers at (2) Buffalo Bills – Game summary

Quarter	1	2	3	4	Total
Steelers	0	7	3	7	17
Bills	14	7	3	7	31

at Highmark Stadium, Orchard Park, New York

- Date: January 15, 2024
- Game time: 4:30 p.m. EST
- Game weather: Partly cloudy, 17 °F (−8 °C)
- Game attendance: 70,040
- Referee: Carl Cheffers
- TV announcers (CBS): Jim Nantz, Tony Romo, Tracy Wolfson and Jay Feely
- Recap, Game Book

Game information

First quarter

- BUF – Dawson Knox 9-yard pass from Josh Allen (Tyler Bass kick), 7:02. Bills 7–0. Drive: 10 plays, 80 yards, 5:33.
- BUF – Dalton Kincaid 29-yard pass from Josh Allen (Tyler Bass kick), 4:10. Bills 14–0. Drive: 1 play, 29 yards, 0:05.

Second quarter

- BUF – Josh Allen 52-yard run (Tyler Bass kick), 7:01. Bills 21–0. Drive: 8 plays, 80 yards, 3:51.
- PIT – Diontae Johnson 10-yard pass from Mason Rudolph (Chris Boswell kick), 1:39. Bills 21–7. Drive: 5 plays, 33 yards, 0:35.

Third quarter

- PIT – Chris Boswell 40-yard field goal, 8:50. Bills 21–10. Drive: 9 plays, 38 yards, 4:34.
- BUF – Tyler Bass 45-yard field goal, 1:32. Bills 24–10. Drive: 14 plays, 48 yards, 7:18.

Fourth quarter

- PIT – Calvin Austin 7-yard pass from Mason Rudolph (Chris Boswell kick), 10:32. Bills 24–17. Drive: 12 plays, 75 yards, 6:00.
- BUF – Khalil Shakir 17-yard pass from Josh Allen (Tyler Bass kick), 6:27. Bills 31–17. Drive: 7 plays, 70 yards, 4:05.

Top passers

- PIT – Mason Rudolph – 22/39, 229 yards, 2 TD, INT
- BUF – Josh Allen – 21/30, 203 yards, 3 TD

Top rushers

- PIT – Jaylen Warren – 8 rushes, 38 yards
- BUF – James Cook – 18 rushes, 79 yards

Top receivers

- PIT – Pat Freiermuth – 5 receptions, 76 yards
- BUF – Dalton Kincaid – 3 receptions, 59 yards, TD

==== AFC Divisional Playoffs: vs. (3) Kansas City Chiefs ====
AFC Divisional Playoffs: (3) Kansas City Chiefs at (2) Buffalo Bills – Game summary

Quarter	1	2	3	4	Total
Chiefs	3	10	7	7	27
Bills	3	14	7	0	24

at Highmark Stadium, Orchard Park, New York

- Date: January 21, 2024
- Game time: 6:30 p.m. EST
- Game weather: Cloudy, 25 °F (−4 °C)
- Game attendance: 70,808
- Referee: Shawn Hochuli
- TV announcers (CBS): Jim Nantz, Tony Romo, Tracy Wolfson and Jay Feely
- Recap, Game Book

Game information

First quarter

- BUF – Tyler Bass 27-yard field goal, 8:08. Bills 3–0. Drive: 14 plays, 60 yards, 6:52.
- KC – Harrison Butker 47-yard field goal, 4:35. Tied 3–3. Drive: 7 plays, 46 yards, 3:33.

Second quarter

- BUF – Josh Allen 5-yard run (Tyler Bass kick), 13:32. Bills 10–3. Drive: 11 plays, 75 yards, 6:03.
- KC – Harrison Butker 29-yard field goal, 9:12. Bills 10–6. Drive: 10 plays, 64 yards, 4:20.
- KC – Travis Kelce 22-yard pass from Patrick Mahomes (Harrison Butker kick), 3:33. Chiefs 13–10. Drive: 5 plays, 65 yards, 2:34.
- BUF – Josh Allen 2-yard run (Tyler Bass kick), 0:26. Bills 17–13. Drive: 12 plays, 75 yards, 3:07.

Third quarter

- KC – Travis Kelce 2-yard pass from Patrick Mahomes (Harrison Butker kick), 11:48. Chiefs 20–17. Drive: 6 plays, 75 yards, 3:12.
- BUF – Khalil Shakir 13-yard pass from Josh Allen (Tyler Bass kick), 3:22. Bills 24–20. Drive: 15 plays, 75 yards, 8:25.

Fourth quarter

- KC – Isiah Pacheco 4-yard run (Harrison Butker kick), 14:20. Chiefs 27–24. Drive: 8 plays, 75 yards, 4:03.

Top passers

- KC – Patrick Mahomes – 17/23, 215 yards, 2 TD
- BUF – Josh Allen – 26/39, 186 yards, TD

Top rushers

- KC – Isiah Pacheco – 15 rushes, 97 yards, TD
- BUF – Josh Allen – 12 rushes, 72 yards, 2 TD

Top receivers

- KC – Travis Kelce – 5 receptions, 75 yards, 2 TD
- BUF – Dalton Kincaid – 5 receptions, 45 yards

== See also ==
- List of organizational conflicts in the NFL
