= Kaiir Elam =

American football player (born 2001)

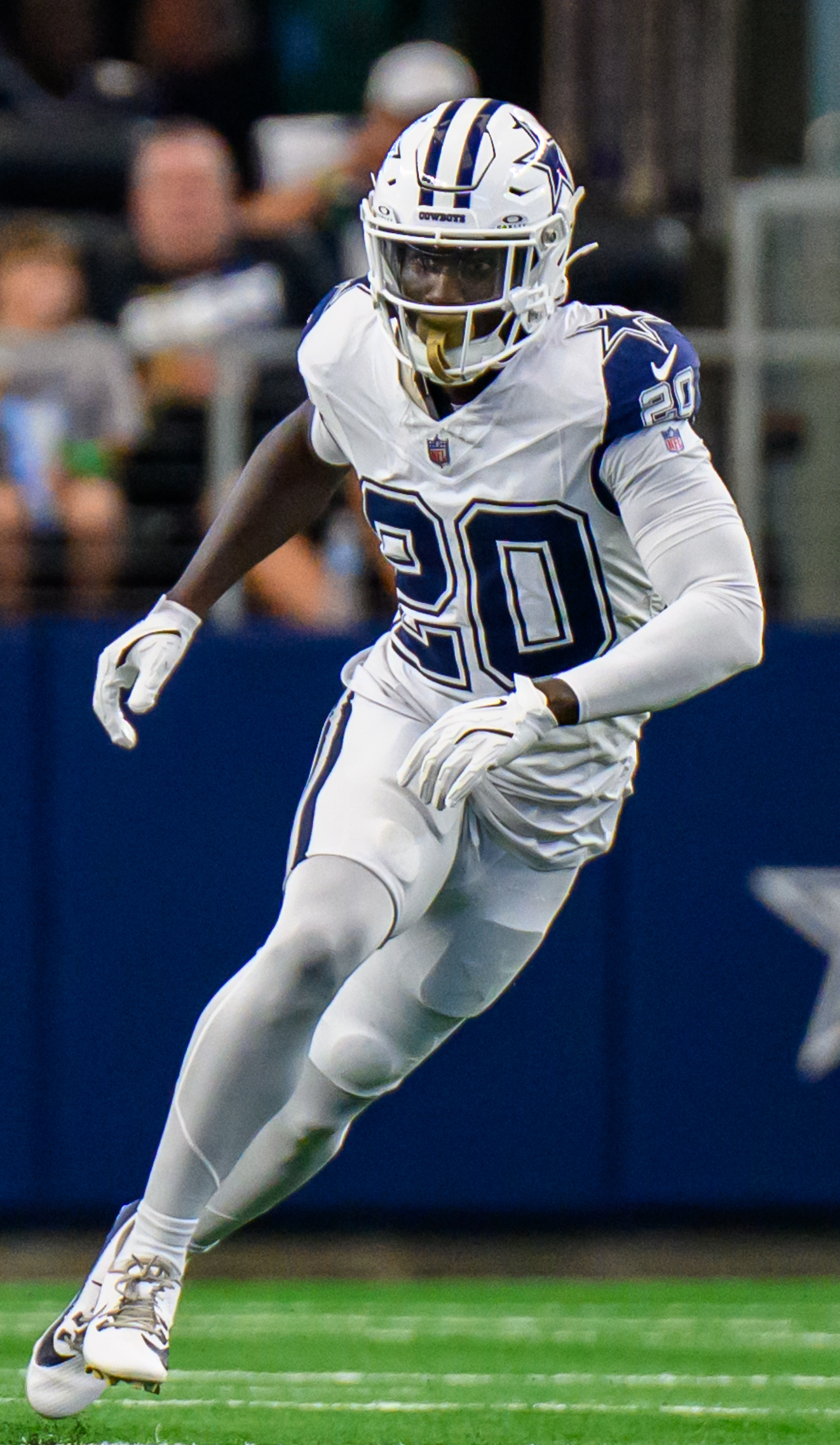
- Elam with the Dallas Cowboys in 2025

No. 29 – Los Angeles Chargers
- Position: Cornerback
- Roster status: Practice squad

Personal information
- Born: May 5, 2001 (age 25); Riviera Beach, Florida, U.S.
- Listed height: 6 ft 1 in (1.85 m)
- Listed weight: 191 lb (87 kg)

Career information
- High school: The Benjamin School (Palm Beach Gardens, Florida)
- College: Florida (2019–2021)
- NFL draft: 2022: 1st round, 23rd overall pick

Career history
- Buffalo Bills (2022–2024); Dallas Cowboys (2025); Tennessee Titans (2025); Kansas City Chiefs (2026)*; Los Angeles Chargers (2026–present)
- * Offseason or practice squad member only

Awards and highlights
- Second-team All-SEC (2020); All-Freshman SEC (2019)

Career NFL statistics as of 2025
- Total tackles: 114
- Fumble recoveries: 3
- Interceptions: 2
- Pass deflections: 8
- Stats at Pro Football Reference

Kaiir Elam (/kaɪˈiːr ˈiːləm/ kai-EER EE-ləm; born May 5, 2001) is an American professional football cornerback for the Los Angeles Chargers of the National Football League (NFL). He played college football for the Florida Gators and was selected by the Buffalo Bills in the first round of the 2022 NFL draft.

== Early life ==
Elam grew up in Riviera Beach, Florida, and attended The Benjamin School, where he played basketball, football, and ran track. As a senior, he recorded 71 tackles, three sacks and nine interceptions and was named the Palm Beach 5A-1A football defensive player of the year. Elam was rated the fourth best high school football prospect of his class by ESPN and committed to play college football at Florida.

== College career ==
As a true freshman, Elam played in all 13 of the Gators' games and made five starts, recording 11 tackles, three interceptions and four additional passes broken up; he was named to the Southeastern Conference (SEC) All-Freshman Team. Elam entered his sophomore season on the Jim Thorpe Award watchlist and was named preseason second-team All-SEC. On January 10, 2022, Elam declared for the 2022 NFL draft.

== Professional career ==
Pre-draft measurables
| Height | Weight | Arm length | Hand span | Wingspan | 40-yard dash | 10-yard split | 20-yard split | 20-yard shuttle | Three-cone drill | Vertical jump | Bench press |
|---|---|---|---|---|---|---|---|---|---|---|---|
| 6 ft 1 1/2 in (1.87 m) | 191 lb (87 kg) | 30 7/8 in (0.78 m) | 8 7/8 in (0.23 m) | 6 ft 4 1/2 in (1.94 m) | 4.39 s | 1.55 s | 2.57 s | 4.21 s | 6.98 s | 37.5 in (0.95 m) | 10 reps |
All values from NFL Combine/Pro Day

=== Buffalo Bills ===
The Buffalo Bills selected Elam in the first round (23rd overall) of the 2022 NFL draft. In order to secure the acquisition of Elam, the Buffalo Bills orchestrated a trade, agreeing to send their first (25th overall) and fourth round (140th overall) picks in the 2022 NFL draft to the Baltimore Ravens in return for the 23rd overall pick. Elam marks the fourth straight defensive player the Bills have selected with a first round pick, following Gregory Rousseau in 2021.

On May 13, 2022, the Buffalo Bills signed Elam to a four-year, $13.69 million contract that is fully guaranteed and includes a signing bonus of $7.13 million. He made his NFL debut in Week 1 against the Los Angeles Rams. Elam recorded his first professional interception off Kenny Pickett in Week 5 on October 9, during the Bills' 38–3 win against the Pittsburgh Steelers. The next week, on October 16, Elam recorded his second NFL interception off Patrick Mahomes during the Bills' 24–20 win against the Kansas City Chiefs. He finished his rookie season with 41 total tackles, two interceptions, and four passes defensed in 13 games. On January 15, 2023, in the Bills' playoff game against the Dolphins in the wild card round, Elam recorded his first career playoff interception off Skylar Thompson in the 34–31 win.

On November 2, 2023, Elam was placed on injured reserve. He was activated on December 27.

On January 15, 2024, during the Bills' playoff game against the Pittsburgh Steelers in the wild card round, Elam committed pass interference on Diontae Johnson, giving the Steelers the ball and a fresh set of downs at the Bills' three yard-line. Two plays later, he recorded his second career playoff interception off Mason Rudolph on a pass intended for Johnson in the end zone, ending the Steelers drive and preventing them from scoring their first points of the game. This interception occurred exactly one year after Elam recorded his first career playoff interception against the Miami Dolphins.

After playing sparingly during the 2024 regular season, Elam was pressed into action during the 2024 AFC Championship Game following an injury from Christian Benford. Elam struggled to defend the Chiefs receivers both in man and zone coverage, committed multiple penalties, and was cited as one of the reasons the Bills lost the game.

=== Dallas Cowboys ===
On March 12, 2025, Elam was traded to the Dallas Cowboys alongside a 2025 sixth-round pick (#204-Ajani Cornelius) in exchange for a 2025 fifth-round pick (#170-Jordan Hancock) and 2026 seventh-round pick (#228-VJ Payne). On May 1, the Cowboys declined the fifth-year option in Elam's contract, making him a free agent after the season. The Cowboys acquired Elam to improve their depth at cornerback after losing Jourdan Lewis in free agency and having All-Pro Trevon Diggs limited with a left knee injury. After starting in the first four games, his playing time began to fluctuate, until the Week 11 contest against the Las Vegas Raiders where he logged zero defensive snaps. The Cowboys waived him on November 22. He appeared in 10 games (seven starts), while allowing 24 receptions for 314 yards and three touchdowns.

=== Tennessee Titans ===
On November 26, 2025, Elam signed with the Tennessee Titans. He made four appearances for the Titans, recording one pass deflection, two fumble recoveries, and four combined tackles.

=== Kansas City Chiefs ===
On April 2, 2026, Elam signed with the Kansas City Chiefs on a one-year contract. The Chiefs released him on August 30, as a part of final roster cuts.

=== Los Angeles Chargers ===
On September 2, 2026, Elam was signed to the Los Angeles Chargers' practice squad. He was released by Los Angeles on September 16, but was re–signed to the practice squad the following day.

== NFL career statistics ==
Legend
| **Bold** | Career High |

=== Regular season ===
| Year | Team | Games | | Tackles | | | | | | Interceptions | | | | | | Fumbles | | | | |
| Year | Team | GP | GS | Cmb | Solo | Ast | TFL | Sck | Sfty | PD | Int | Yds | Avg | Lng | TD | FF | FR | Yds | Avg | TD |
|---|---|---|---|---|---|---|---|---|---|---|---|---|---|---|---|---|---|---|---|---|
| 2022 | BUF | 13 | 6 | **41** | **29** | **12** | 1 | 0.0 | 0 | **4** | **2** | 0 | 0.0 | 0 | 0 | 0 | 0 | – | – | – |
| 2023 | BUF | 3 | 2 | 14 | 10 | 4 | 0 | 0.0 | 0 | 0 | 0 | – | – | – | – | 0 | 0 | – | – | – |
| 2024 | BUF | 13 | 4 | 26 | 17 | 9 | **2** | 0.0 | 0 | 2 | 0 | – | – | – | – | 0 | 1 | 0 | 0.0 | 0 |
| 2025 | DAL | 10 | 7 | 29 | 19 | 10 | 0 | 0.0 | 0 | 1 | 0 | – | – | – | – | 0 | 0 | – | – | – |
| 2025 | TEN | 4 | 0 | 4 | 3 | 1 | 1 | 0.0 | 0 | 1 | 0 | – | – | – | – | 0 | **2** | **9** | **4.5** | 0 |
| Career | | 43 | 19 | 114 | 78 | 36 | 4 | 0.0 | 0 | 8 | 2 | 0 | 0.0 | 0 | 0 | 0 | 3 | 9 | 3.0 | 0 |

=== Postseason ===
| Year | Team | Games | | Tackles | | | | | | Interceptions | | | | | | Fumbles | | | | |
| Year | Team | GP | GS | Cmb | Solo | Ast | TFL | Sck | Sfty | PD | Int | Yds | Avg | Lng | TD | FF | FR | Yds | Avg | TD |
|---|---|---|---|---|---|---|---|---|---|---|---|---|---|---|---|---|---|---|---|---|
| 2022 | BUF | 2 | 1 | **6** | **5** | 1 | 0 | 0.0 | 0 | **2** | **1** | 0 | 0.0 | 0 | 0 | 0 | 0 | – | – | – |
| 2023 | BUF | 2 | 0 | 5 | 1 | **4** | 0 | 0.0 | 0 | 1 | **1** | 0 | 0.0 | 0 | 0 | 0 | 0 | – | – | – |
| 2024 | BUF | 1 | 0 | 3 | 2 | 1 | 0 | 0.0 | 0 | 0 | 0 | – | – | – | – | 0 | 0 | – | – | – |
| Career | | 5 | 1 | 14 | 8 | 6 | 0 | 0.0 | 0 | 3 | 2 | 0 | 0.0 | 0 | 0 | 0 | 0 | 0 | 0 | 0 |

== Personal life ==
Elam's father, Abram Elam, played college football at Kent State and in the NFL for seven seasons. His uncle, Matt Elam, also played football at Florida and was a first round selection in the 2013 NFL draft. Matt Elam currently plays for the Massachusetts Pirates of the Indoor Football League (IFL).
