= List of Buffalo Bills first-round draft picks =

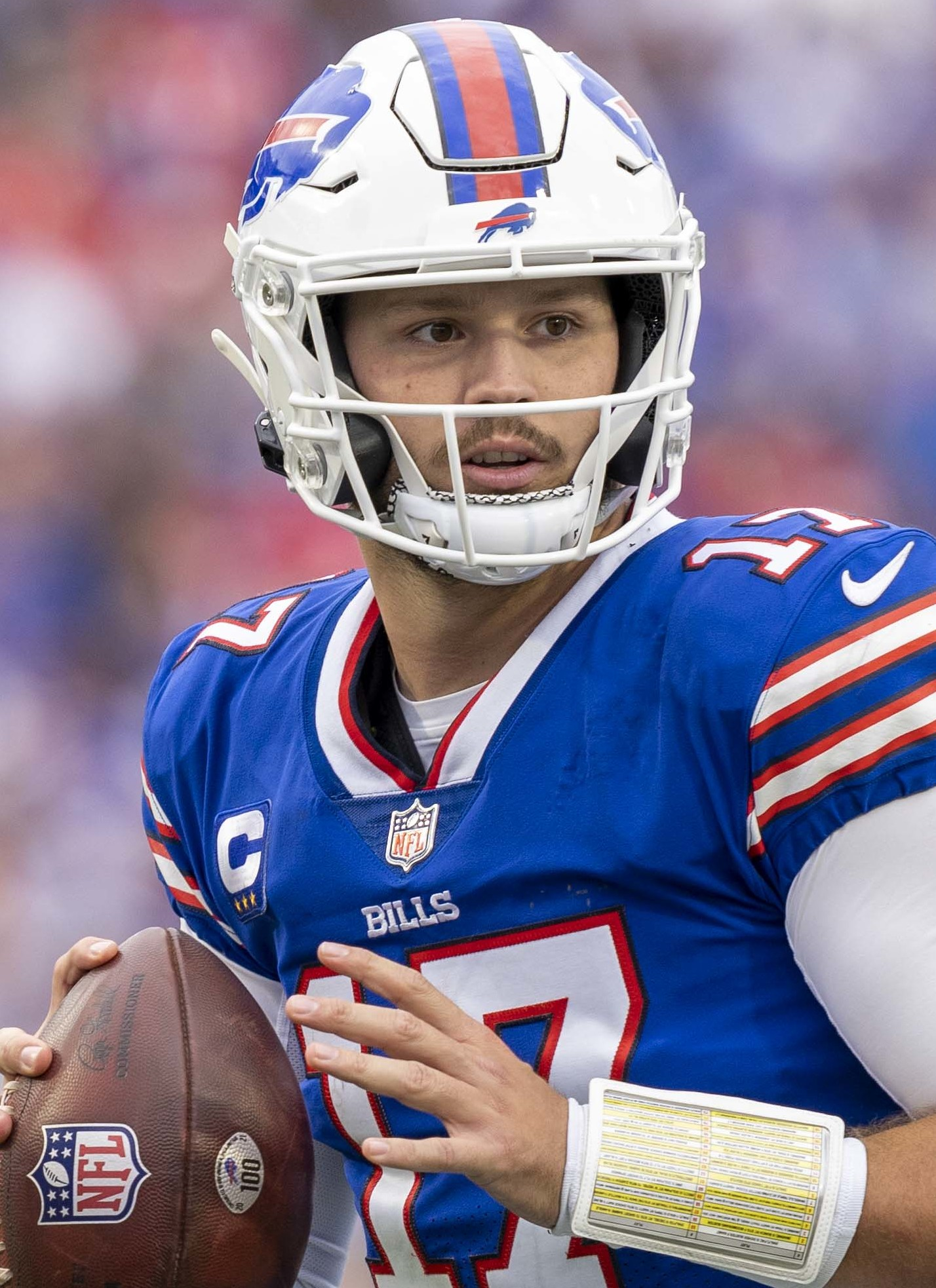
The Bills traded up in the first round of the 2018 NFL draft to select quarterback Josh Allen with the 7th overall pick.

The Buffalo Bills are a professional American football team based in the Buffalo–Niagara Falls metropolitan area. The Bills compete in the National Football League (NFL) as a member of the East Division of the American Football Conference. Founded in 1959 by Ralph Wilson, they were a charter member of the American Football League (AFL) and joined the NFL in 1970 following the AFL–NFL merger. The Bills' name is derived from an All-America Football Conference franchise from Buffalo that was in turn named after western frontiersman Buffalo Bill. Since 1973 they have played their home games at Highmark Stadium in Orchard Park, New York.

The NFL draft, officially known as the "NFL Annual Player Selection Meeting", is an annual event which serves as the league's most common source of player recruitment. The draft order is determined based on the previous season's standings; the teams with the worst win–loss records receive the earliest picks. Teams that qualified for the NFL playoffs select after non-qualifiers, and their order depends on how far they advanced, using their regular season record as a tie-breaker. The final two selections in the first round are reserved for the Super Bowl runner-up and champion. Draft picks are tradable and players or other picks can be acquired with them.

Before the merger agreements in 1966, the AFL directly competed with the NFL and held a separate draft. This led to a bidding war over top prospects between the two leagues, along with the subsequent drafting of the same player in each draft. As part of the merger agreement on June 8, 1966, the two leagues began holding a multiple round "common draft". Once the AFL officially merged with the NFL in 1970, the "common draft" simply became the NFL draft. The first AFL draft was held prior to the start of the 1960 season. The first round of the 1960 AFL draft was territorial selections. Each team received a "territorial pick" which allowed them to select a single player within a pre-agreed upon designated region (the team's "territory"). Teams then agreed on the top eight players at each position, who were subsequently assigned to teams by random draw, with each of the eight teams receiving one of those players. This process was repeated until all 53 roster spots were filled. Beginning in the 1961 draft, the AFL, using the same system as the NFL, began to assign picks based on the previous season's standings.

Since the team's first draft, the Bills have selected 68 players in the first round. The team's first-round pick in the inaugural AFL draft was Richie Lucas, a quarterback out of Penn State; he was the team's territorial selection. The Bills have held the first overall pick five times, four times in the NFL draft and once in the AFL draft. They selected Ken Rice in 1961, O. J. Simpson in 1969, Walt Patulski in 1972, Tom Cousineau in 1979, and Bruce Smith in 1985. In the most recent draft, held in 2025, the Bills selected Kentucky cornerback Maxwell Hairston.

The Bills did not draft a player in the first round on seven occasions. Five of the team's first-round picks—Joe DeLamielleure, Carl Eller, Jim Kelly, O. J. Simpson, and Bruce Smith—have been elected to the Pro Football Hall of Fame; one of these, Carl Eller, chose not to play for the Bills and joined the NFL instead. The Bills used an additional two first-round picks in the 1960s to select players—Ernie Davis and Mike Dennis—who also chose to sign with the NFL instead.

== Player selections ==
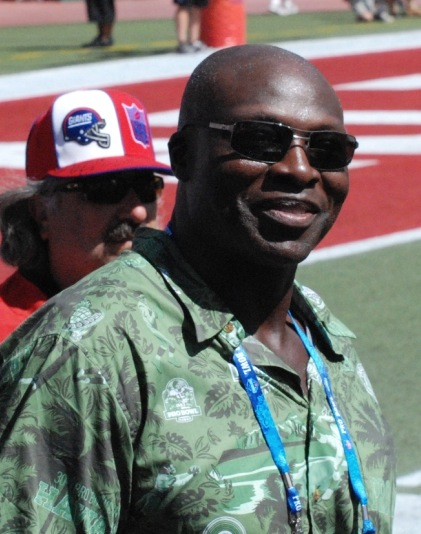
Defensive end Bruce Smith, drafted by the Bills first overall in the 1985 NFL draft, spent 15 seasons with the Bills and is the NFL's all-time leader in career sacks. During his time with the Bills he was a two-time Defensive Player of the Year, 9-time first-team All-Pro, and 11-time Pro Bowler. He was selected for the NFL 100th Anniversary All-Time Team and was inducted into the Pro Football Hall of Fame in 2009.

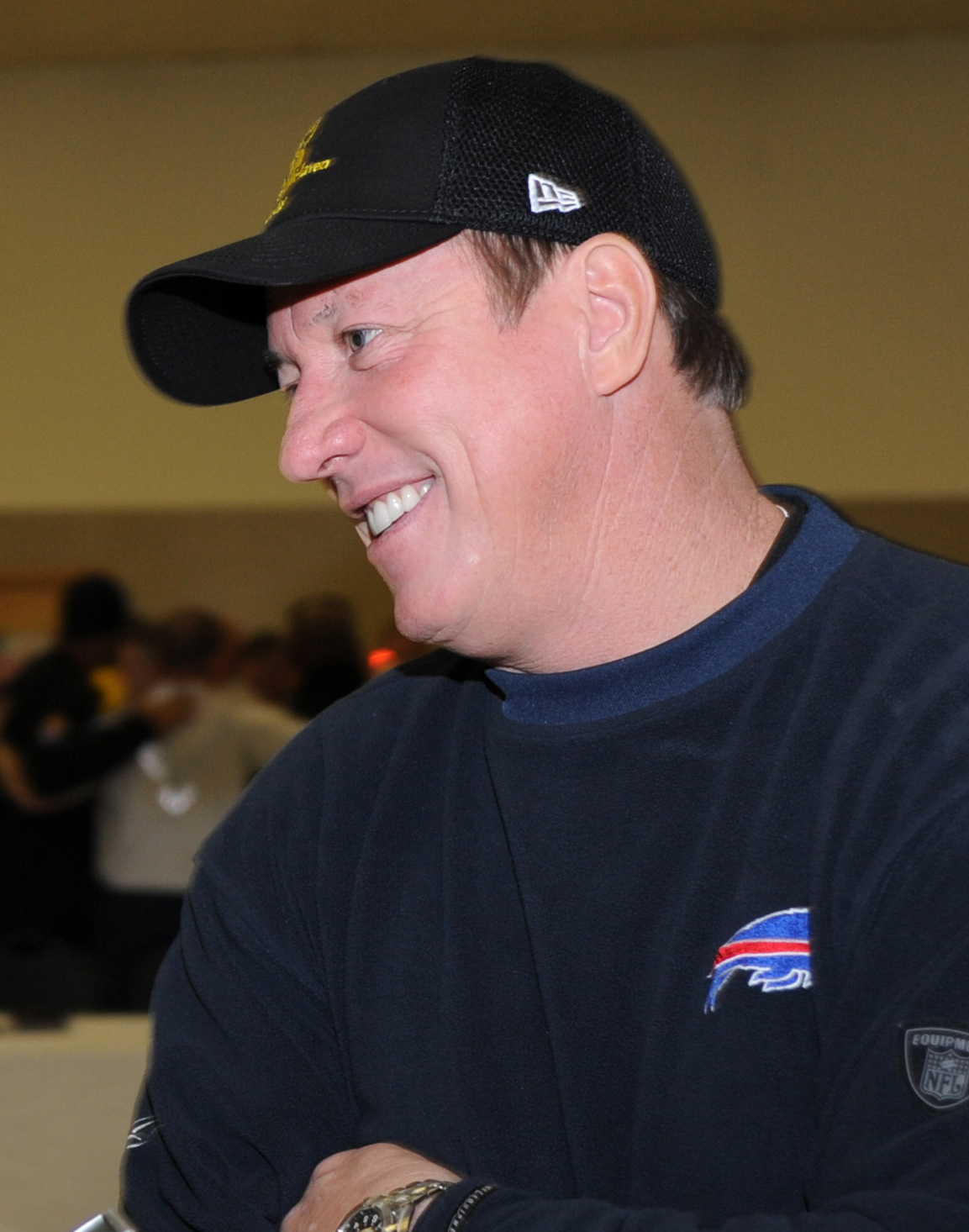
Quarterback Jim Kelly was drafted with the 14th pick in the 1983 NFL draft and spent 11 seasons with the team. A five-time Pro Bowler, Kelly was the franchise leader in most major passing stats at the time of his retirement. The Bills retired the number 12 jersey in his honor.

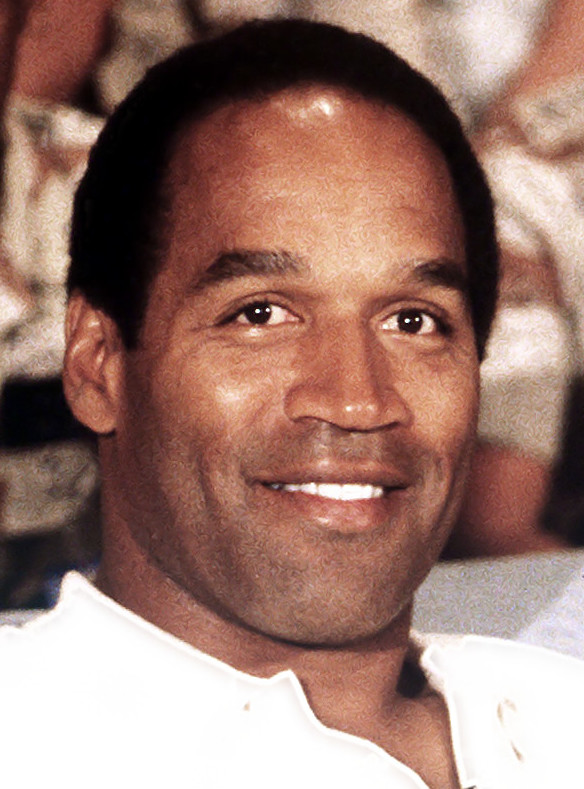
Running back O. J. Simpson was selected first overall in the 1969 draft. Simpson spent nine seasons with the team, during which he was a five-time first-team All-Pro, six-time Pro Bowler, 1973 MVP, led the league in rushing touchdowns twice, and led the league in rushing yards four times. He was inducted into the Hall of Fame in 1985 and was selected to the NFL 100th Anniversary All-Time Team.

Key
| Symbol | Meaning |
|---|---|
| † | Inducted into the Pro Football Hall of Fame |
| * | Selected number one overall |
| ‡ | Selected number one overall and inducted into the Pro Football Hall of Fame |

Buffalo Bills first-round draft picks by season
| Season | Pick | Player | Position | College | Notes |
|---|---|---|---|---|---|
| 1960 | Territorial | Richie Lucas | QB | Penn State | First round was territorial selections (Note: The first round of the 1960 AFL draft was territorial selections. Teams were allowed to select a single player from a designated region (their "territory").) |
| 1961 | 1 | Ken Rice* | T | Auburn | |
| 1962 | 4 | Ernie Davis | HB | Syracuse | Signed for the NFL's Cleveland Browns instead |
| 1963 | 4 | Dave Behrman | C | Michigan State | |
| 1964 | 5 | Carl Eller† | DE | Minnesota | Signed for the NFL's Minnesota Vikings instead |
| 1965 | 8 | Jim Davidson | T | Ohio State | |
| 1966 | 8 | Mike Dennis | RB | Ole Miss | Signed for the NFL's Los Angeles Rams instead |
| 1967 | 22 | John Pitts | S | Arizona State | |
| 1968 | 9 | Haven Moses | WR | San Diego State | |
| 1969 | 1 | O. J. Simpson‡ | RB | USC | |
| 1970 | 5 | Al Cowlings | DT | USC | |
| 1971 | 4 | J. D. Hill | WR | Arizona State | |
| 1972 | 1 | Walt Patulski* | DE | Notre Dame | |
| 1973 | 7 | Paul Seymour | TE | Michigan | |
| 1973 | 26 | Joe DeLamielleure† | G | Michigan State | Pick received from Miami Dolphins (Note: Buffalo traded wide receiver Marlin Briscoe to the Miami Dolphins in exchange for their 1973 first-round selection (No. 26 overall).) |
| 1974 | 18 | Reuben Gant | TE | Oklahoma State | |
| 1975 | 19 | Tom Ruud | LB | Nebraska | |
| 1976 | 18 | Mario Clark | DB | Oregon | |
| 1977 | 12 | Phil Dokes | DT | Oklahoma State | Pick received from Detroit Lions. (Note: Buffalo traded wide receiver J. D. Hill to the Detroit Lions in exchange for their 1977 first-round selection (No. 12 overall).) Original pick traded to Cincinnati Bengals. (Note: Buffalo traded their 1977 first-round selection (No. 3 overall) to the Cincinnati Bengals in exchange for defensive end Sherman White.) |
| 1978 | 5 | Terry Miller | RB | Oklahoma State | |
| 1979 | 1 | Tom Cousineau* | LB | Ohio State | Pick received from San Francisco 49ers (Note: Buffalo traded running back O. J. Simpson to the San Francisco 49ers in exchange for their 1978 second- and third-round selections (Nos. 38 and 65 overall), 1979 first- and fourth-round selections (Nos. 1 and 83 overall), and 1980 second-round selection (No. 29 overall).) |
| 1979 | 5 | Jerry Butler | WR | Clemson | |
| 1980 | 16 | Jim Ritcher | C | N.C. State | Moved down draft order in trade with Seattle Seahawks (Note: Buffalo traded their 1980 first-round selection (No. 10 overall) to the Seattle Seahawks in exchange for their 1980 first- and third-round selections (Nos. 16 and 71 overall).) |
| 1981 | 28 | Booker Moore | RB | Penn State | Moved down draft order in trade with Los Angeles Raiders (Note: Buffalo traded their 1981 first-round selection (No. 23 overall) to the Los Angeles Raiders in exchange for their 1981 first- and third-round selections (Nos. 28 and 83 overall).) |
| 1982 | 19 | Perry Tuttle | WR | Clemson | Moved up draft order in trade with Denver Broncos (Note: Buffalo traded their 1982 first- and fourth-round selections (Nos. 21 and 106 overall) to the Denver Broncos in exchange for their 1982 first-round selection (No. 19 overall).) |
| 1983 | 12 | Tony Hunter | TE | Notre Dame | |
| 1983 | 14 | Jim Kelly† | QB | Miami (FL) | Picked received from Cleveland Browns. (Note: Buffalo traded linebacker Tom Cousineau to the Cleveland Browns in exchange for their 1983 first-round selection (No. 14 overall), 1984 third-round selection (No. 77 overall), and 1985 fifth-round selection (No. 119 overall).) Signed for the USFL's Houston Gamblers instead. (Note: Jim Kelly signed for the Houston Gamblers of the United States Football League (USFL). Kelly played for the Gamblers for two seasons until the USFL folded prior to the 1986 USFL season. The Bills had retained the rights to Kelly and, after the USFL folded, signed him to a record contract.) |
| 1984 | 26 | Greg Bell | RB | Notre Dame | Moved down draft order in trade with Miami Dolphins (Note: Buffalo traded their 1984 first-round selection (No. 14 overall) to the Miami Dolphins in exchange for their 1984 first- and two third-round selections (Nos. 26, 79, and 82 overall).) |
| 1985 | 1 | Bruce Smith‡ | DE | Virginia Tech | |
| 1985 | 14 | Derrick Burroughs | DB | Memphis State | Pick received from Green Bay Packers (Note: Buffalo traded a 1985 first-round selection (No. 7 overall, received from Cleveland Browns) (Note: Linebacker Chip Banks was included as part of a trade for the first overall pick in the 1985 supplemental draft. (Note: Buffalo traded their 1985 supplemental draft first-round pick (No. 1 overall) to the Cleveland Browns in exchange for linebacker Chip Banks, a 1985 third-round selection (No. 63 overall), and their 1986 first- and sixth-round selections (Nos. 16 and 154 overall).) Based on a provision of the trade agreement, the Cleveland Browns were forced to give Buffalo their 1985 first-round selection (No. 7 overall) because Banks did not show up for his physical with Buffalo.) to the Green Bay Packers in exchange for their 1985 first- and second-round selections (Nos. 14 and 42 overall).) |
| 1986 | 16 | Ronnie Harmon | RB | Iowa | Pick received from Cleveland Browns |
| 1986 | 20 | Will Wolford | T | Vanderbilt | Moved up draft order in trade with San Francisco 49ers (Note: Buffalo traded their 1986 second- and third-round selections (Nos. 29 and 56 overall) to the San Francisco 49ers in exchange for their 1986 first-round selection (No. 20 overall) and 1987 tenth-round selection (No. 273 overall).) |
| 1987 | 8 | Shane Conlan | LB | Penn State | Moved down draft order in trade with Houston Oilers (Note: Buffalo traded their 1987 first-round selection (No. 3 overall) to the Houston Oilers in exchange for their 1987 first- and second-round selections (Nos. 8 and 36 overall).) |
| 1988 | No pick | | | | Pick traded to Los Angeles Rams (Note: Buffalo, in a 3-way trade involving the Indianapolis Colts and Los Angeles Rams, traded their 1988 first-round selection (No. 14 overall) and their 1989 first- and second-round selections (Nos. 26 and 53 overall) in exchange for the rights to linebacker Cornelius Bennett.) |
| 1989 | No pick | | | | Pick traded to Los Angeles Rams |
| 1990 | 16 | James Williams | DB | Fresno State | |
| 1991 | 26 | Henry Jones | DB | Illinois | |
| 1992 | 27 | John Fina | T | Arizona | |
| 1993 | 28 | Thomas Smith | DB | North Carolina | |
| 1994 | 27 | Jeff Burris | DB | Notre Dame | |
| 1995 | 14 | Ruben Brown | G | Pittsburgh | |
| 1996 | 24 | Eric Moulds | WR | Mississippi State | |
| 1997 | 23 | Antowain Smith | RB | Houston | |
| 1998 | No pick | | | | Pick traded to Jacksonville Jaguars (Note: Buffalo traded their 1998 first- and fourth-round selections (Nos. 9 and 101 overall) to the Jacksonville Jaguars in exchange for quarterback Rob Johnson.) |
| 1999 | 23 | Antoine Winfield | DB | Ohio State | |
| 2000 | 26 | Erik Flowers | DE | Arizona State | |
| 2001 | 21 | Nate Clements | DB | Ohio State | Moved down draft order in trade with Tampa Bay Buccaneers (Note: Buffalo traded their 2001 first-round selection (No. 14 overall) to the Tampa Bay Buccaneers in exchange for their 2001 first and second-round selections (Nos. 21 and 51 overall).) |
| 2002 | 4 | Mike Williams | T | Texas | |
| 2003 | 23 | Willis McGahee | RB | Miami (FL) | Pick received from Atlanta Falcons. (Note: Buffalo traded wide receiver Peerless Price to the Atlanta Falcons in exchange for their 2003 first-round selection (No. 23 overall).) Original pick traded to New England Patriots. (Note: Buffalo traded their 2003 first-round selection (No. 14 overall) to the New England Patriots in exchange for quarterback Drew Bledsoe.) |
| 2004 | 13 | Lee Evans | WR | Wisconsin | |
| 2004 | 22 | J. P. Losman | QB | Tulane | Moved up draft order in trade with Dallas Cowboys (Note: Buffalo traded their 2004 second- and fifth-round selections (Nos. 43 and 144 overall) and their 2005 first-round selection (No. 20 overall) to the Dallas Cowboys in exchange for their 2004 first-round selection (No. 22 overall).) |
| 2005 | No pick | | | | Pick traded to Dallas Cowboys |
| 2006 | 8 | Donte Whitner | S | Ohio State | |
| 2006 | 26 | John McCargo | DT | N.C. State | Moved up draft order in trade with Chicago Bears (Note: Buffalo traded their 2006 second- and third-round selections (Nos. 42 and 73 overall) to the Chicago Bears in exchange for their 2006 first-round selection (No. 26 overall).) |
| 2007 | 12 | Marshawn Lynch | RB | California | |
| 2008 | 11 | Leodis McKelvin | DB | Troy | |
| 2009 | 11 | Aaron Maybin | DE | Penn State | |
| 2009 | 28 | Eric Wood | C | Louisville | |
| 2010 | 9 | C. J. Spiller | RB | Clemson | |
| 2011 | 3 | Marcell Dareus | DT | Alabama | |
| 2012 | 10 | Stephon Gilmore | CB | South Carolina | |
| 2013 | 16 | EJ Manuel | QB | Florida State | Moved down draft order in trade with St. Louis Rams (Note: Buffalo traded their 2013 first- and third-round selections (Nos. 8 and 71 overall) to the St. Louis Rams in exchange for their 2013 first-, second-, third- and seventh-round selections (Nos. 16, 46, 67, and 222 overall).) |
| 2014 | 4 | Sammy Watkins | WR | Clemson | Moved up draft order in trade with Cleveland Browns (Note: Buffalo traded their 2014 first-round selection (No. 9 overall) and their 2015 first- and fifth-round selections (Nos. 19 and 115 overall) to the Cleveland Browns in exchange for their 2014 first-round selection (No. 4 overall).) |
| 2015 | No pick | | | | Pick traded to Cleveland Browns |
| 2016 | 19 | Shaq Lawson | DE | Clemson | |
| 2017 | 27 | Tre'Davious White | CB | LSU | Moved down draft order in trade with Kansas City Chiefs (Note: Buffalo traded their 2017 first-round selection (No. 10 overall) to the Kansas City Chiefs in exchange for their 2017 first- and third-round selections (Nos. 27 and 91 overall) and their 2018 first-round selection (No. 22 overall).) |
| 2018 | 7 | Josh Allen | QB | Wyoming | Moved up draft order in trade with Tampa Bay Buccaneers (Note: Buffalo traded a 2018 first- (received from the Cincinnati Bengals) (Note: Buffalo traded tackle Cordy Glenn, as well as a 2018 first- and fifth-round selection (Nos. 21 and 158 overall) to the Cincinnati Bengals in exchange for their 2018 first-round selection (No. 12 overall).) and two second-round selections (Nos. 12, 53, and 56 overall) to the Tampa Bay Buccaneers in exchange for their 2018 first- and seventh-round selections (Nos. 7 and 255 overall).) |
| 2018 | 16 | Tremaine Edmunds | LB | Virginia Tech | Moved up draft order in trade with Baltimore Ravens (Note: Buffalo traded a 2018 first- (received from the Kansas City Chiefs) and third-round selection (Nos. 22 and 65 overall) to the Baltimore Ravens in exchange for their 2018 first- and fifth-round selections (Nos. 16 and 154 overall).) |
| 2019 | 9 | Ed Oliver | DT | Houston | |
| 2020 | No pick | | | | Pick traded to Minnesota Vikings (Note: Buffalo traded their 2020 first-, fifth-, and sixth-round selections (Nos. 22, 155, and 201 overall), as well as a 2021 fourth-round selection (No. 134 overall) to the Minnesota Vikings in exchange for wide receiver Stefon Diggs and a 2020 seventh-round selection (No. 239 overall).) |
| 2021 | 30 | Greg Rousseau | DE | Miami (FL) | |
| 2022 | 23 | Kaiir Elam | CB | Florida | Moved up draft order in trade with Baltimore Ravens (Note: Buffalo traded their 2022 first- and fourth-round selections (Nos. 25 and 130 overall) to the Baltimore Ravens in exchange for their 2022 first-round selection (No. 23 overall).) |
| 2023 | 25 | Dalton Kincaid | TE | Utah | Moved up draft order in trade with Jacksonville Jaguars (Note: Buffalo traded their 2023 first- and fourth-round selections (Nos. 27 and 130 overall) to the Jacksonville Jaguars in exchange for their 2023 first-round selection (No. 25 overall).) |
| 2024 | No pick | | | | Moved down draft order in trades with Kansas City Chiefs (Note: Buffalo traded their 2024 first-, fourth-, and seventh-round selection (Nos. 28, 133, and 248 overall) to the Kansas City Chiefs in exchange for their 2024 first-, third-, and seventh-round selections (Nos. 32, 95, and 221 overall).) and Carolina Panthers (Note: Buffalo traded a 2024 first- (received from the Kansas City Chiefs) and sixth-round selection (Nos. 32 and 200 overall) to the Carolina Panthers in exchange for their 2024 second- and fifth-round selections (Nos. 33 and 141 overall).) |
| 2025 | 30 | Maxwell Hairston | CB | Kentucky | |
| 2026 | No pick | | | | Moved down draft order in trades with Houston Texans, (Note: Buffalo traded first- and third-round selections (26th and 91st overall) to Houston in exchange for first-, third- and fifth-round selections (28th, 69th and 167th overall).) New England Patriots, (Note: Buffalo traded a first-round selection (28th overall) to New England in exchange for first- and fourth-round selections (31st and 125th overall).) and Tennessee Titans. (Note: Buffalo traded first-, third- and fifth-round selections (31st, 69th and 165th overall) to Tennessee in exchange for second-, third- and fourth-round selections (35th, 66th and 101st overall).) |

== See also ==
- History of the Buffalo Bills
- List of Buffalo Bills seasons
