= Deonte Harty =

American football player (born 1997)

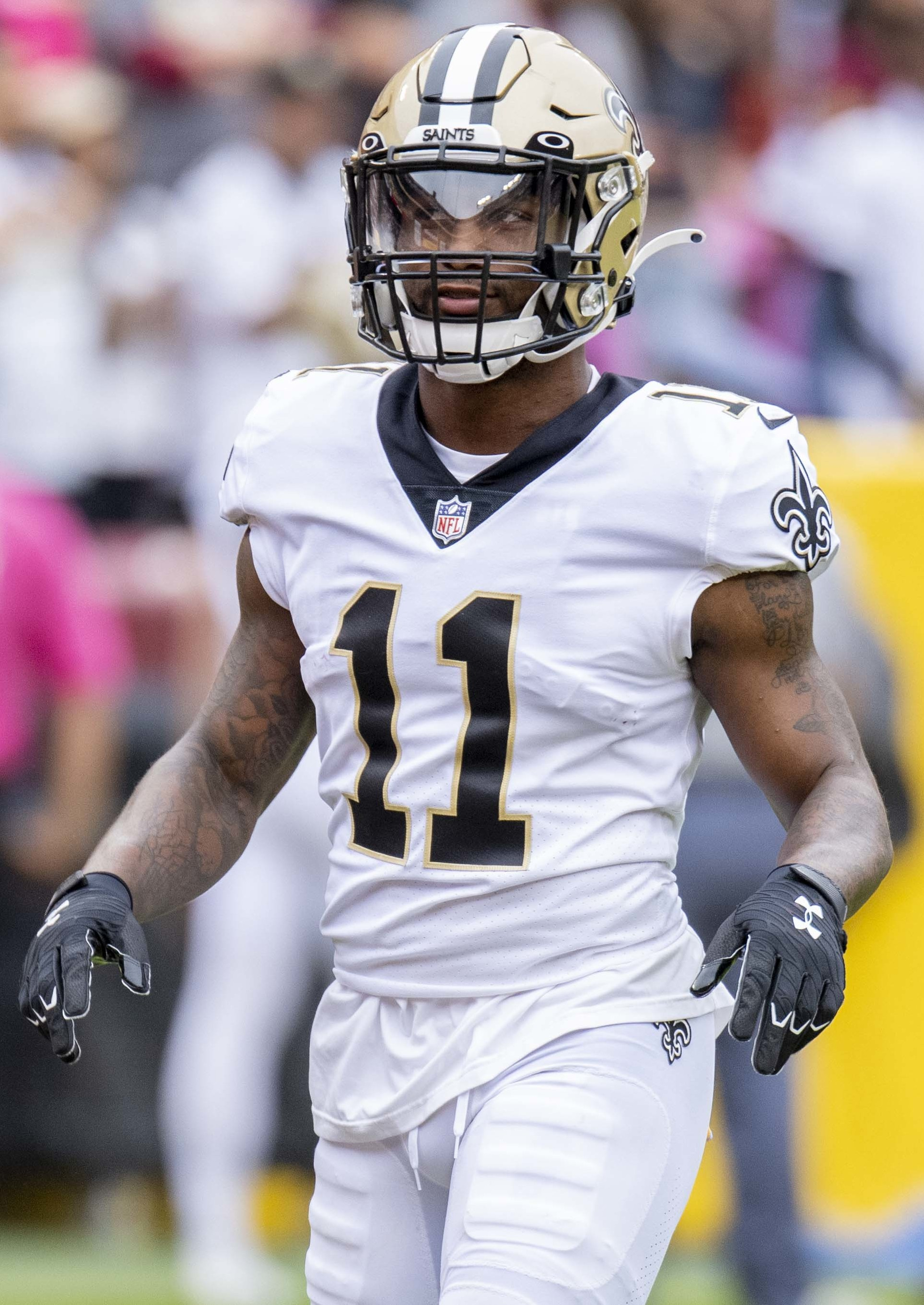
- Harty with the New Orleans Saints in 2021

Profile
- Positions: Wide receiver, return specialist

Personal information
- Born: December 4, 1997 (age 28); Baltimore, Maryland, U.S.
- Listed height: 5 ft 6 in (1.68 m)
- Listed weight: 170 lb (77 kg)

Career information
- High school: Archbishop Curley (Baltimore)
- College: Assumption (2015–2018)
- NFL draft: 2019: undrafted

Career history
- New Orleans Saints (2019–2022); Buffalo Bills (2023); Baltimore Ravens (2024)

Awards and highlights
- First-team All-Pro (2019) (Note: Selected as a punt returner); Pro Bowl (2019); NFL punt return yards leader (2019); PFWA All-Rookie Team (2019)

Career NFL statistics
- Receptions: 79
- Receiving yards: 943
- Rushing yards: 123
- Return yards: 3,172
- Total touchdowns: 7
- Stats at Pro Football Reference

Deonte Harty (né Harris; December 4, 1997) is an American professional football wide receiver and return specialist. He played college football for the Assumption Greyhounds and signed with the New Orleans Saints as an undrafted free agent in 2019. Harty grew up in the Baltimore suburb of Middle River, Maryland and played high school football at Archbishop Curley High School where he also lettered in basketball and track & field.

== Early life ==
As a senior at Baltimore's Archbishop Curley High School, Harty was named the 2014 Varsity Sports Network Offensive Player of the Year for football. He earned All-Conference and All-State honors, and was selected to The Baltimore Sun's First-team All-Metro for the 2014 football season. That same year, Harty led the Friars to the Maryland Interscholastic Athletic Association (MIAA) B Conference Championship and their first undefeated football season in school history, which included a 28–0 shutout victory over traditional MIAA "A" Conference powerhouse Loyola Blakefield, a game in which Harty amassed 206 total yards (140 rushing, 66 receiving) with 2 touchdowns. He recorded 2,030 yards of total offense for that season with 25 touchdowns in 10 games. He ran for 1,450 yards for the season on 130 carries with 20 rushing touchdowns. In the 2014 MIAA Championship game, Harty had 211 total yards, scoring 5 touchdowns in a 56–14 victory over St. Paul's School to win the league championship.

As a junior (2013) Harty and rushed for 933 yards on 86 carries for the Friars and scored a total of 18 touchdowns (14 rushing and four receiving). As a sophomore (2012), he went for 676 yards on 63 carries with six touchdowns.

== College career ==
Harty played football at Assumption University.

Assumption University career highlights:

- Holds the NCAA record (regardless of division) as college football's all-time leader for combined touchdown returns – 14
- Holds the NCAA D-II Record for single-season combined touchdown returns – 8
- Tied NCAA Division-II Record for single-game kickoff return touchdowns – 2
- Tied NCAA Division-II Record for single-season punt return touchdowns – 5
- 2017 Northeast-10 Conference MVP
- 2015 Northeast-10 Conference Rookie of the Year
- 2018 Second-team All-American by the American Football Coaches Association
- 2018 Northeast-10 Conference First-team All-Conference as WR & KR
- 2017 First-team All-American by the American Football Coaches Association
- 2017 First-team All-American by Conference Commissioner's Association
- 2017 Second-team All-American by D2football.com
- 2017 Northeast-10 Conference First-team All-Conference as WR & KR
- 2015 Don Hansen Football Gazette Second-team All-American

School records:

- Career Touchdowns (45)
- All-purpose yards in school history- 6,173
- Combined touchdown returns in school history – 14
- Combined touchdown returns in a single season in school history – 8 (2017)
- Punt return touchdowns in a single season – 5 (2017)
- Punts returned for touchdowns in a single game – 2 (twice)
- Kickoffs returned for touchdowns in a single game – 2
- Punts returned for touchdowns in school history – 8
- Kickoffs returned for touchdowns in school history – 6

== Professional career ==
Pre-draft measurables
Height	Weight	Arm length	Hand span	40-yard dash	10-yard split	20-yard split	20-yard shuttle	Three-cone drill	Vertical jump	Broad jump	Bench press
5 ft 6 3/8 in (1.69 m)	171 lb (78 kg)	28 1/4 in (0.72 m)	8 3/4 in (0.22 m)	4.48 s	1.51 s	2.50 s	4.16 s	6.82 s	33.0 in (0.84 m)	9 ft 6 in (2.90 m)	10 reps
All values from Pro Day

=== New Orleans Saints ===
==== 2019 season ====
Harty signed with the New Orleans Saints as a rookie undrafted free agent in 2019. After an impressive training camp featuring a 78-yard touchdown return against the New York Jets in the pre-season, he made the final cut and was named to the Saints 53-man roster.

Harty made his NFL debut on Monday Night Football as the Saints primary kick returner in the season-opener against the Houston Texans. During a Week 3 33–27 road victory over the Seattle Seahawks, he scored his first NFL touchdown on a 53-yard punt return, the NFL's first punt return touchdown of the season.

Harty finished his rookie year as the leader in punt returns, combined returns, and punt return yards and was selected to the Pro Bowl. He was the first undrafted player in franchise history to make the Pro Bowl roster as a rookie. Harty was also just one of four players in the league to have a punt return touchdown in 2019. He was also named to the PFWA All-Rookie Team.

==== 2020 season ====
Harty was placed on the reserve/COVID-19 list by the Saints on August 14, 2020, and was activated two days later. He scored his first professional receiving touchdown in Week 7 against the Carolina Panthers. On December 19, Harty was placed on injured reserve. He was activated on January 9, 2021.

==== 2021 season ====
On November 26, 2021, Harty was suspended three games after a DUI arrest in July.

==== 2022 season ====
On March 14, 2022, the Saints placed a second-round restricted free agent tender on Harty. He was placed on injured reserve on October 15.

=== Buffalo Bills ===
On March 16, 2023, Harty signed a two-year contract with the Buffalo Bills. He became one of the team's main kick returners, but also saw some action on offense, catching his first touchdown with the Bills against the New York Giants. In the regular season finale against the Miami Dolphins, Harty returned a punt 96 yards for a touchdown, sparking a fourth-quarter comeback for the Bills as they would go on to win 21–14 and finish atop the AFC East. He was named AFC Special Teams Player of the Week for his performance.

Harty was released on March 6, 2024.

=== Baltimore Ravens ===
On April 14, 2024, Harty signed with the Baltimore Ravens.

== NFL career statistics ==
Legend
	Led the league
**Bold**	Career-high

=== Regular season ===
Year	Team	Games		Receiving					Rushing					Returning					Fumbles	
Year	Team	GP	GS	Rec	Yds	Avg	Lng	TD	Att	Yds	Avg	Lng	TD	Ret	Yds	Avg	Lng	TD	Fum	Lost
2019	NO	14	1	6	24	4.0	13	0	4	31	7.8	10	0	**60**	**982**	16.4	53T	**1**	**3**	1
2020	NO	9	**2**	20	186	9.3	40	1	**6**	**51**	**8.5**	**23**	0	33	643	**19.5**	75	0	**3**	1
2021	NO	13	1	**36**	**570**	**15.8**	**72**	**3**	5	41	8.2	22	0	50	889	17.8	39	0	2	1
2022	NO	4	0	2	13	6.5	9	0	-	-	-	-	-	9	145	16.1	33	0	0	0
2023	BUF	**16**	1	15	150	10.0	43	1	4	0	0.0	4	0	27	330	12.2	**96T**	**1**	2	**2**
2024	BAL	5	0	0	0	0.0	0	0	-	-	-	-	-	12	183	15.3	31	0	0	0
Career		61	5	79	943	11.9	72	5	19	123	6.5	23	0	191	3,172	16.6	96T	2	10	5

=== Postseason ===
Year	Team	Games		Receiving					Rushing					Returning					Fumbles	
Year	Team	GP	GS	Rec	Yds	Avg	Lng	TD	Att	Yds	Avg	Lng	TD	Ret	Yds	Avg	Lng	TD	Fum	Lost
2019	NO	1	**1**	1	50	**50.0**	**50**	0	-	-	-	-	-	**8**	**177**	22.1	**54**	0	0	0
2020	NO	**2**	**1**	**8**	**82**	10.3	24	0	1	-2	-2.0	-2	0	5	83	16.6	**54**	0	0	0
2023	BUF	2	0	2	37	18.5	34	0	-	-	-	-	-	1	27	**27.0**	27	0	0	0
Career		5	2	11	169	15.4	50	0	1	-2	-2.0	-2	0	14	287	20.5	54	0	0	0

== Legal issues ==
On July 16, 2021, Harty was arrested in Towson, Maryland on suspicion of driving under the influence of alcohol. He was cited for negligent driving, reckless driving, failure to obey traffic control device instructions, and exceeding the speed limit after driving erratically and going 77 mph in a 55-mph zone.

== Personal life ==
In December 2021, Harris legally changed his name to Deonte Harty to honor his stepfather.
