= Greg Rousseau =

American football player (born 2000)

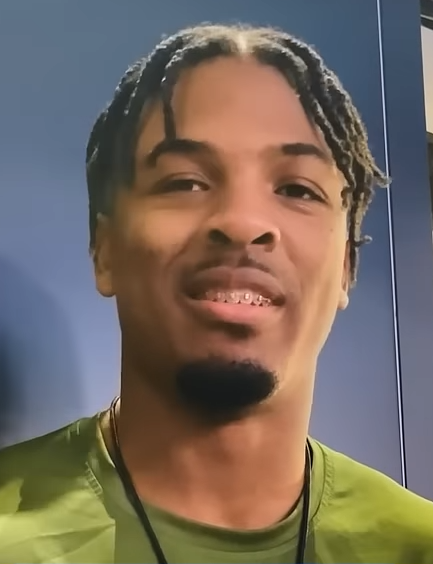
- Rousseau in 2022

No. 15 – Buffalo Bills
- Position: Outside linebacker
- Roster status: Active

Personal information
- Born: April 5, 2000 (age 26); Coconut Creek, Florida, U.S.
- Listed height: 6 ft 7 in (2.01 m)
- Listed weight: 266 lb (121 kg)

Career information
- High school: Champagnat Catholic (Hialeah, Florida)
- College: Miami (FL) (2018–2020)
- NFL draft: 2021: 1st round, 30th overall pick

Career history
- Buffalo Bills (2021–present)

Awards and highlights
- ACC Defensive Rookie of the Year (2019); First-team All-ACC (2019); Second-team All-American (2019); Freshman All-American (2019)

Career NFL statistics as of Week 11, 2026
- Total tackles: 256
- Sacks: 42.0
- Forced fumbles: 10
- Fumble recoveries: 3
- Interceptions: 1
- Pass deflections: 25
- Stats at Pro Football Reference

Gregory Rousseau (born April 5, 2000) is an American professional football outside linebacker for the Buffalo Bills of the National Football League (NFL). He played college football for the Miami Hurricanes and was selected by the Bills in the first round of the 2021 NFL draft.

== Early life and college ==
Born to Haitian parents from New York, Rousseau attended Champagnat Catholic School in Hialeah, Florida. He played defensive end, safety and wide receiver in high school. He committed to the University of Miami to play college football.

Rousseau played in the first two games of his true freshman year in 2018 before suffering a season-ending ankle injury and redshirted. He entered his redshirt freshman year in 2019, as a backup but eventually took over as starter later in the season. He was named ACC Defensive Rookie of the Year after recording 15.5 sacks that season, second in the nation behind only Chase Young's 16.5. He opted out of the 2020 season due to concerns regarding the COVID-19 pandemic.

== Professional career ==
Pre-draft measurables
Height	Weight	Arm length	Hand span	Wingspan	40-yard dash	10-yard split	20-yard split	20-yard shuttle	Three-cone drill	Vertical jump	Broad jump	Bench press
6 ft 6 5/8 in (2.00 m)	266 lb (121 kg)	34 3/8 in (0.87 m)	11 1/8 in (0.28 m)	6 ft 11 1/4 in (2.11 m)	4.67 s	1.57 s	2.71 s	4.53 s	7.50 s	30.0 in (0.76 m)	9 ft 7 in (2.92 m)	21 reps
All values from Pro Day

Rousseau was selected by the Buffalo Bills in the first round (30th overall) in the 2021 NFL draft. He signed his four-year rookie contract, worth $11.37 million, on June 4, 2021.

During Week 2 of the 2021 season, Rousseau was nominated for NFL Rookie of the Week honors with five tackles, two sacks, and two tackles made behind the line of scrimmage. Rousseau recorded his first career interception on October 10, 2021, in a 38-20 Week 5 Sunday night win against Patrick Mahomes and the Kansas City Chiefs, earning AFC Defensive Player of the Week. In his rookie season, Rousseau finished with four sacks, 50 total tackles, one interception, four passes defended, and one forced fumble.

In the 2022 season, he finished with eight sacks, 37 total tackles, four passes defended, and forced fumble in 13 games. His best performance of the year came in week 14 against the New York Jets, in which he recorded 2 sacks, including a forced fumble, and a pass defensed, contributing to a 20–12 Buffalo win one week after the team's leading pass rusher Von Miller suffered a season-ending knee injury against the Detroit Lions on Thanksgiving.

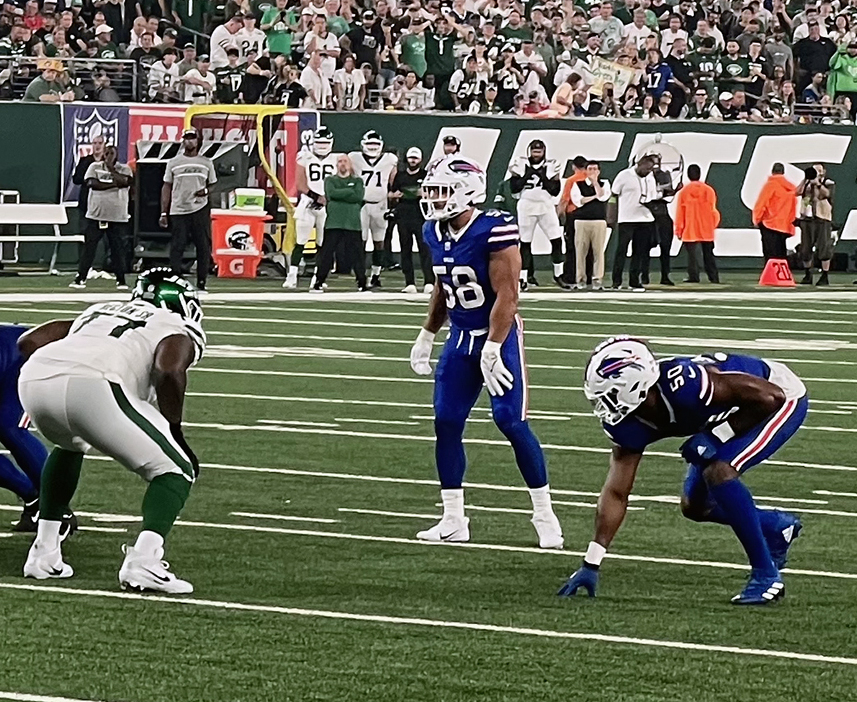
Rousseau (#50) and teammate Matt Milano (#58) lining up against the New York Jets in 2023

On April 29, 2024, the Bills picked up the fifth-year option on Rousseau's contract. In Week 1, he recorded six tackles, three sacks, and a forced fumble in a 34-28 win over the Cardinals, earning AFC Defensive Player of the Week.

On March 8, 2025, Rousseau signed a four-year $80 million contract extension with the Bills, with $54 million guaranteed.

Following head coach Sean McDermott's departure after the 2025 season, new head coach Joe Brady brought in defensive coordinator Jim Leonhard, who moved Rousseau from defensive end to outside linebacker as part of a transition to a 3–4 defense. In Week 1 of the 2026 season, Rousseau recorded two strip-sacks on Houston Texans quarterback C. J. Stroud, including one that foiled a last-minute comeback attempt by the Texans and sealed the Bills' 36–31 victory, their first in Houston since 2006. In October, Rousseau was named the AFC Defensive Player of the Month for September after leading the league in sacks during the first three games of the season. In Week 5 against the Los Angeles Rams, Rousseau blocked a potential game-winning field goal for Los Angeles in overtime, setting up the Bills' 37–34 victory. As a result of the blocked kick, Rousseau was named the AFC Special Teams Player of the Week.

== NFL career statistics ==
Legend
**Bold**	Career high

=== Regular season ===
Year	Team	Games		Tackles							Interceptions						Fumbles				
Year	Team	GP	GS	Cmb	Solo	Ast	TFL	QBH	Sck	Sfty	PD	Int	Yds	Y/I	Lng	TD	FF	FR	Yds	Y/R	TD
2021	BUF	17	17	50	**42**	8	8	10	4.0	0	4	**1**	**3**	**3.0**	**3**	0	1	0	0	0.0	0
2022	BUF	13	13	37	27	10	10	14	**8.0**	0	4	0	0	0.0	0	0	1	0	0	0.0	0
2023	BUF	16	16	42	30	12	12	18	5.0	0	4	0	0	0.0	0	0	1	**1**	0	0.0	0
2024	BUF	16	16	**53**	36	17	**16**	24	**8.0**	0	3	0	0	0.0	0	0	**3**	**1**	0	0.0	0
2025	BUF	16	16	46	24	**22**	6	23	7.0	0	2	0	0	0.0	0	0	1	0	0	0.0	0
2026	BUF	10	10	28	20	8	12	**29**	**10.0**	0	**8**	0	0	0.0	0	0	**3**	1	0	0.0	0
Career		88	88	256	179	77	64	118	42.0	0	25	1	3	3.0	3	0	10	3	0	0.0	0

=== Postseason ===
Year	Team	Games		Tackles							Interceptions						Fumbles				
Year	Team	GP	GS	Cmb	Solo	Ast	TFL	QBH	Sck	Sfty	PD	Int	Yds	Y/I	Lng	TD	FF	FR	Yds	Y/R	TD
2021	BUF	2	2	3	2	1	0	0	0.0	0	0	0	0	—	0	0	0	0	0	—	0
2022	BUF	2	2	4	3	1	0	1	0.0	0	0	0	0	—	0	0	0	0	0	—	0
2023	BUF	2	2	5	2	3	1	2	1.0	0	0	0	0	—	0	0	0	0	0	—	0
2024	BUF	3	3	**10**	**7**	3	**3**	2	**2.0**	0	0	0	0	—	0	0	0	0	0	—	0
2025	BUF	2	2	8	4	**4**	2	**5**	1.0	0	**2**	0	0	—	0	0	0	0	0	—	0
Career		11	11	30	18	12	6	10	4.0	0	2	0	0	—	0	0	0	0	0	—	0
