= 2019 Buffalo Bills season =

National Football League team season

- Owner: Terry and Kim Pegula
- General manager: Brandon Beane
- Head coach: Sean McDermott
- Offensive coordinator: Brian Daboll
- Defensive coordinator: Leslie Frazier
- Home stadium: New Era Field

Results
- Record: 10–6
- Division place: 2nd AFC East
- Playoffs: Lost Wild Card Playoffs (at Texans) 19–22 (OT)
- All-Pros: CB Tre'Davious White (1st team)
- Pro Bowlers: 3: CB Tre'Davious White; LB Tremaine Edmunds; RS Andre Roberts

Uniform
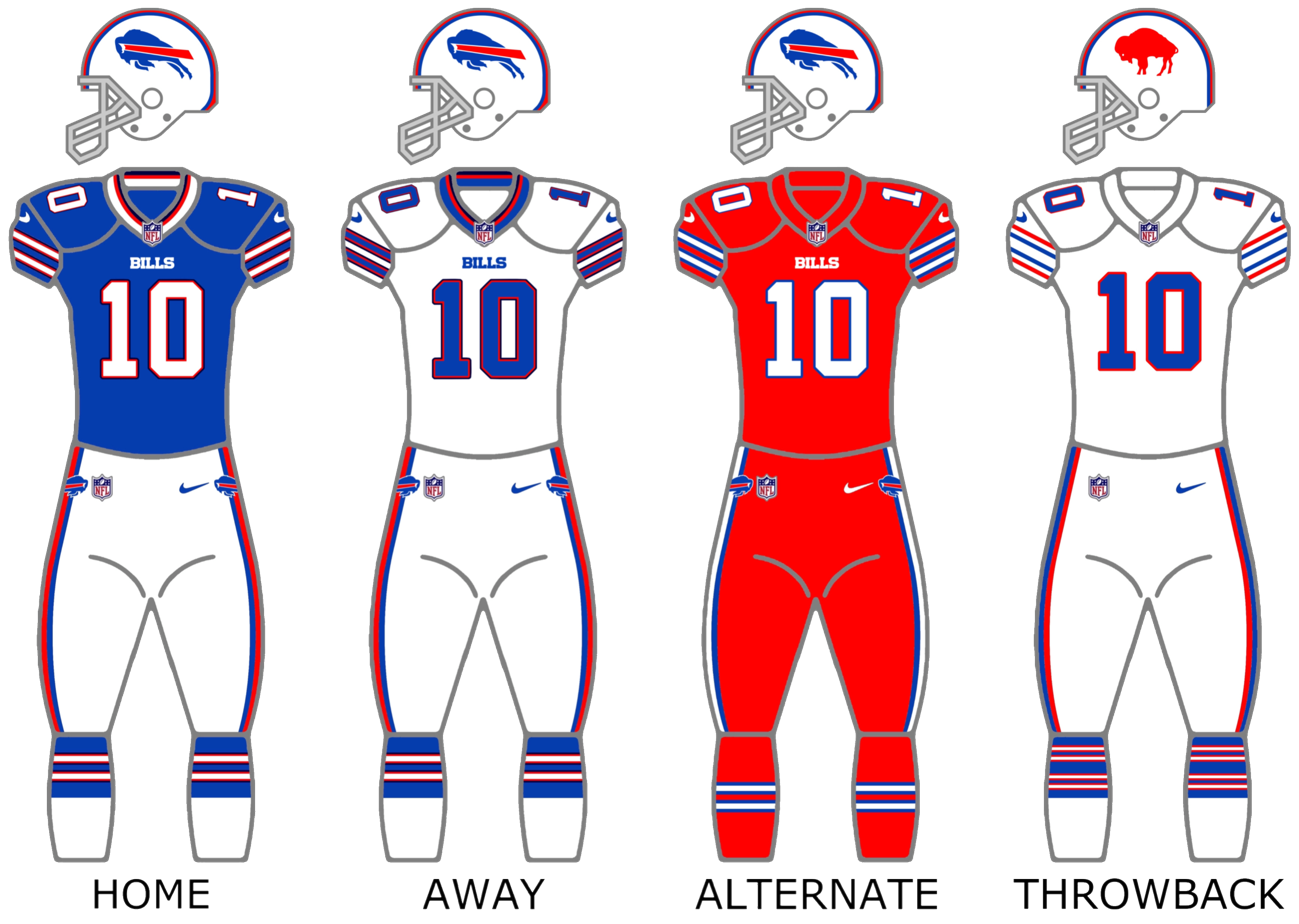

The 2019 season was the Buffalo Bills' 60th overall, 50th in the National Football League (NFL), fifth full under the ownership of Terry and Kim Pegula and third under the head coach/general manager tandem of Sean McDermott and Brandon Beane.

During the offseason, Buffalo acquired several players who would make major contributions on offense. The Bills improved on their 6–10 record from the previous season with a 37–20 win over Miami Dolphins in Week 11, then clinched their second winning season in three years with a 26–15 win over the Dallas Cowboys on Thanksgiving Day. Despite losing 24–17 to the Baltimore Ravens in Week 14, the Bills' 9–4 record marked the first time since 1996 (during the Marv Levy/Jim Kelly era) that the team won at least nine of their first 13 games and matching their highest full-season win total (2004, 2014 and 2017) in the 21st century with four games remaining. With a 17–10 win over the Pittsburgh Steelers in Week 15, not only did the Bills clinch their second playoff berth in three years, but they reached 10 wins for the first time since winning 11 in 1999, which was also the last time the team made the playoffs until 2017.

The Bills defense finished an impressive season with just 259 points allowed, second in the league behind only the New England Patriots. The defense allowed more than 20 points just five times all season, and more than 30 points only once (in Week 8 against the Philadelphia Eagles). Overall, the Bills had the lowest-scoring games in the league with just 573 total points scored and allowed.

The #5 seed Bills attempted to win their first playoff game since 1995 in the wild-card round, but were defeated by the #4 seed Houston Texans 22–19 in overtime after giving up a 16–0 lead. The loss extended their playoff win drought to 25 years.

This was the last season that the Bills did not win the AFC East until 2025, but remains the last season the Bills failed to advance to at least the Divisional Round of the playoffs.

== Transactions ==
=== Free agency ===
The Bills freed up cap space after paying off the dead money for players from the Doug Whaley era they had either cut or traded over the past two offseasons, including WR Sammy Watkins, CB Ronald Darby and DT Marcell Dareus. To address the team's offensive woes from the previous season, numerous offensive players such as WRs John Brown, Cole Beasley and Andre Roberts, C Mitch Morse, RBs Frank Gore and T. J. Yeldon and others were added in free agency, with Beane angrily dismissing the notion that "free agents don't want to play for Buffalo."

==== Arrivals ====
Position	Player	2018 team	Date signed	Notes
WR	Duke Williams	Edmonton Eskimos (CFL)	January 7, 2019	Reserve/Future
C/G	Spencer Long	New York Jets	February 12, 2019	3 years / $12.6 million
WR	Cole Beasley	Dallas Cowboys	March 13, 2019	4 years / $29 million
WR	John Brown	Baltimore Ravens	March 13, 2019	3 years / $27 million
RB	Frank Gore	Miami Dolphins	March 13, 2019	1 year / $2 million
C	Mitch Morse	Kansas City Chiefs	March 13, 2019	4 years / $44 million
G	Jon Feliciano	Oakland Raiders	March 13, 2019	2 years / $8 million
T	Ty Nsekhe	Washington Redskins	March 13, 2019	2 years / $15 million
TE	Tyler Kroft	Cincinnati Bengals	March 13, 2019	3 years / $18.75 million
CB	Kevin Johnson	Houston Texans	March 13, 2019	1 year / $3 million
WR/KR	Andre Roberts	New York Jets	March 13, 2019	2 years / $5.1 million
T	LaAdrian Waddle	New England Patriots	March 16, 2019	1 year / $2 million
LB	Maurice Alexander	Seattle Seahawks	March 22, 2019	1 year / $1 million
TE	Jake Fisher	Cincinnati Bengals	March 22, 2019	1 year / $850,000
CB	E. J. Gaines	Cleveland Browns	March 25, 2019	1 year / $2.1 million
RB	Senorise Perry	Miami Dolphins	March 28, 2019	1 year / $810,000
G	Quinton Spain	Tennessee Titans	April 3, 2019	1 year / $2.05 million
RB	Christian Wade	Wasps (rugby union)	April 9, 2019	International Player Pathway
DE	Eli Harold	Detroit Lions	April 10, 2019	1 year / $895,000
RB	T. J. Yeldon	Jacksonville Jaguars	April 22, 2019	2 years / $3.2 million
TE	Lee Smith	Oakland Raiders	May 13, 2019	3 years / $9 million
OG	Nico Siragusa	Green Bay Packers	August 1, 2019	

==== Departures ====
Position	Player	2019 team	Date signed	Notes
TE	Charles Clay	Arizona Cardinals	February 19, 2019	1 year / $2 million
G	John Miller	Cincinnati Bengals	March 16, 2019	3 years / $16.5 million
TE	Logan Thomas	Detroit Lions	March 21, 2019	1 year / $895,000
OT	Jordan Mills	Miami Dolphins	May 9, 2019	1 year / $3 million

=== NFL draft ===
2019 Buffalo Bills Draft
Round	Selection	Player	Position	College
1	9	Ed Oliver	DT	Houston
2	38	Cody Ford	G	Oklahoma
3	74	Devin Singletary	RB	FAU
3	96	Dawson Knox	TE	Ole Miss
5	147	Vosean Joseph	LB	Florida
6	181	Jaquan Johnson	S	Miami (FL)
7	225	Darryl Johnson	DE	North Carolina A&T
7	228	Tommy Sweeney	TE	Boston College

Notes

- The Bills traded their second fifth round pick (number 158 overall) to Oakland for G Cody Ford.
- The Bills traded both their fourth round picks (number 113 and 132 overall) to Washington for TE Dawson Knox.

== Staff ==
2019 Buffalo Bills staff
Front office: Owner/CEO – Terry Pegula; Owner/president – Kim Pegula; General manager – Brandon Beane; Assistant general manager – Joe Schoen; Director of player personnel – Dan Morgan; Director of college scouting – Terrance Gray; Senior VP of football administration – Jim Overdorf; Assistant director of college scouting – Lake Dawson; Director of pro personnel – Malik Boyd; Director of football administration – Kevin Meganck; Director of football operations – Brendan Rowe; Head coaches: Head coach – Sean McDermott; Assistant to the head coach – Matt Worswick; Offensive coaches: Offensive coordinator – Brian Daboll; Quarterbacks – Ken Dorsey; Running backs – Kelly Skipper; Wide receivers – Chad Hall; Tight ends – Rob Boras; Offensive line – Bobby Johnson; Assistant offensive line – Terry Heffernan; Offensive assistant – Shea Tierney; Offensive assistant – Ryan Wendell; Offensive quality control/defense special projects – Marc Lubick	Defensive coaches: Defensive coordinator – Leslie Frazier; Defensive line – Bill Teerlinck; Assistant defensive line – Aaron Whitecotton; Linebackers – Bob Babich; Defensive backs – John Butler; Safeties – Bobby Babich; Defensive assistant – Jim Salgado; Defensive quality control/assistant linebackers – John Egorugwu; Special teams coaches: Special teams coordinator – Heath Farwell; Assistant special teams – Matthew Smiley; Strength and conditioning: Head strength and conditioning – Eric Ciano; Assistant strength and conditioning – Hal Luther; Assistant strength and conditioning – Will Greenberg; Strength and conditioning assistant – Jason Oszvart; Strength and conditioning assistant – Mark Loecher

== Final roster ==
2019 Buffalo Bills roster
Quarterbacks (QB): 17 Josh Allen; 5 Matt Barkley; Running backs (RB): 42 Patrick DiMarco FB; 20 Frank Gore; 32 Senorise Perry; 26 Devin Singletary; 22 T. J. Yeldon; Wide receivers (WR): 10 Cole Beasley; 15 John Brown; 16 Robert Foster; 19 Isaiah McKenzie; 18 Andre Roberts RS; 82 Duke Williams; Tight ends (TE): 88 Dawson Knox; 81 Tyler Kroft; 85 Lee Smith; 89 Tommy Sweeney	Offensive linemen (OL): 71 Ryan Bates G; 65 Ike Boettger G; 73 Dion Dawkins T; 76 Jon Feliciano G; 70 Cody Ford T; 61 Spencer Long C; 60 Mitch Morse C; 77 Ty Nsekhe T; 67 Quinton Spain G; Defensive linemen (DL): 55 Jerry Hughes DE; 92 Darryl Johnson DE; 90 Shaq Lawson DE; 94 Corey Liuget DT; 98 Star Lotulelei DT; 93 Trent Murphy DE; 91 Ed Oliver DT; 97 Jordan Phillips DT; 96 Vincent Taylor DT	Linebackers (LB): 57 Lorenzo Alexander OLB; 49 Tremaine Edmunds MLB; 58 Matt Milano OLB; 51 Julian Stanford MLB; 52 Corey Thompson OLB; Defensive backs (DB): 28 Kurt Coleman SS; 23 Micah Hyde FS; 46 Jaquan Johnson FS; 29 Kevin Johnson CB; 24 Taron Johnson CB; 31 Dean Marlowe SS; 33 Siran Neal CB; 21 Jordan Poyer SS; 39 Levi Wallace CB; 27 Tre'Davious White CB; Special teams (ST): 9 Corey Bojorquez P; 69 Reid Ferguson LS; 4 Stephen Hauschka K	Practice squad: 84 Nate Becker TE; 53 Tyrel Dodson MLB; 86 Nick Easley WR; 68 Brandon Hitner T; 47 Cam Lewis CB; 14 Ray-Ray McCloud WR; 43 Del'Shawn Phillips OLB; 62 Victor Salako T; 45 Christian Wade RB (Int.); 7 Davis Webb QB; 59 Jonathan Woodard DE; Reserve: 41 Maurice Alexander OLB (IR); 80 Jason Croom TE (IR); 50 Vosean Joseph OLB (IR); 56 Mike Love DE (IR); 99 Harrison Phillips DT (IR); 74 LaAdrian Waddle T (IR); Rookies in italics 53 active, 6 reserve, 11 practice squad

== Preseason ==
The Bills went undefeated in their preseason games for the first time in franchise history. The team had only once before won their first three preseason games in 1966 before losing the preseason finale.

Week	Date	Opponent	Result	Record	Venue	Recap
1	August 8	Indianapolis Colts	W 24–16	1–0	New Era Field	Recap
2	August 16	at Carolina Panthers	W 27–14	2–0	Bank of America Stadium	Recap
3	August 23	at Detroit Lions	W 24–20	3–0	Ford Field	Recap
4	August 29	Minnesota Vikings	W 27–23	4–0	New Era Field	Recap

== Regular season ==
=== Schedule ===
Week	Date	Opponent	Result	Record	Venue	Recap
1	September 8	at **New York Jets**	**W** 17–16	1–0	MetLife Stadium	Recap
2	September 15	at New York Giants	**W** 28–14	2–0	MetLife Stadium	Recap
3	September 22	Cincinnati Bengals	**W** 21–17	3–0	New Era Field	Recap
4	September 29	**New England Patriots**	**L** 10–16	3–1	New Era Field	Recap
5	October 6	at Tennessee Titans	**W** 14–7	4–1	Nissan Stadium	Recap
6	Bye					
7	October 20	**Miami Dolphins**	**W** 31–21	5–1	New Era Field	Recap
8	October 27	Philadelphia Eagles	**L** 13–31	5–2	New Era Field	Recap
9	November 3	Washington Redskins	**W** 24–9	6–2	New Era Field	Recap
10	November 10	at Cleveland Browns	**L** 16–19	6–3	FirstEnergy Stadium	Recap
11	November 17	at **Miami Dolphins**	**W** 37–20	7–3	Hard Rock Stadium	Recap
12	November 24	Denver Broncos	**W** 20–3	8–3	New Era Field	Recap
13	November 28	at Dallas Cowboys	**W** 26–15	9–3	AT&T Stadium	Recap
14	December 8	Baltimore Ravens	**L** 17–24	9–4	New Era Field	Recap
15	December 15	at Pittsburgh Steelers	**W** 17–10	10–4	Heinz Field	Recap
16	December 21	at **New England Patriots**	**L** 17–24	10–5	Gillette Stadium	Recap
17	December 29	**New York Jets**	**L** 6–13	10–6	New Era Field	Recap

Note: Intra-division opponents are in bold text.

=== Game summaries ===
==== Week 1: at New York Jets ====
Week One: Buffalo Bills at New York Jets – Game summary

Quarter	1	2	3	4	Total
**Bills**	0	0	3	14	**17**
Jets	6	0	10	0	**16**

at MetLife Stadium, East Rutherford, New Jersey

- Date: September 8
- Game time: 1:00 p.m. EDT
- Game weather: Mostly sunny, 77 °F (25 °C)
- Game attendance: 78,523
- Referee: Clay Martin
- TV announcers (CBS): Kevin Harlan, Rich Gannon and Amanda Balionis
- Recap, Game Book

Game information

**First quarter**

- NYJ – C. J. Mosley 17-yard interception return (kick failed, hit left upright), 10:34. Jets 6–0.

**Second quarter**

- No scoring plays.

**Third quarter**

- NYJ – Frank Gore tackled in the end zone by Brian Poole and Jordan Jenkins for a safety, 11:52. Jets 8–0.
- NYJ – Le'Veon Bell 9-yard pass from Sam Darnold (Sam Darnold–Le'Veon Bell pass), 7:01. Jets 16–0. **Drive: 9 plays, 60 yards, 4:51.**
- BUF – Stephen Hauschka 43-yard field goal, 3:48. Jets 16–3. **Drive: 9 plays, 50 yards, 3:13.**

**Fourth quarter**

- BUF – Josh Allen 3-yard run (Stephen Hauschka kick), 10:21. Jets 16–10. **Drive: 8 plays, 85 yards, 4:33.**
- BUF – John Brown 38-yard pass from Josh Allen (Stephen Hauschka kick), 3:00. Bills 17–16. **Drive: 8 plays, 80 yards, 2:55.**

**Top passers**

- BUF – Josh Allen – 24/37, 254 yards, TD, 2 INT
- NYJ – Sam Darnold – 28/41, 175 yards, TD

**Top rushers**

- BUF – Devin Singletary – 4 rushes, 70 yards
- NYJ – Le'Veon Bell – 17 rushes, 60 yards

**Top receivers**

- BUF – John Brown – 7 receptions, 123 yards, TD
- NYJ – Jamison Crowder – 14 receptions, 99 yards

Despite four first-half turnovers, two of which were interceptions by QB Josh Allen and being down 16–0 in the third quarter, the Bills scored on three consecutive drives afterwards, with the defense stifling Jets QB Sam Darnold and RB Le'Veon Bell for the most part, but it was an injury to Jets LB C. J. Mosley, along with misses on an extra point and a field goal by Jets K Kaare Vedvik (ultimately leading to his subsequent release), that paved the way for Buffalo's largest comeback win since Week 3 of the 2011 season, when the Bills came back from a 21–0 first-half deficit to upset the New England Patriots 34–31.

==== Week 2: at New York Giants ====
Week Two: Buffalo Bills at New York Giants – Game summary

Quarter	1	2	3	4	Total
**Bills**	7	14	0	7	**28**
Giants	7	0	0	7	**14**

at MetLife Stadium, East Rutherford, New Jersey

- Date: September 15
- Game time: 1:00 p.m. EDT
- Game weather: Fair, 79 °F (26 °C)
- Game attendance: 74,569
- Referee: Shawn Smith
- TV announcers (CBS): Greg Gumbel, Trent Green and Melanie Collins
- Recap, Game Book

Game information

**First quarter**

- NYG – Saquon Barkley 27-yard run (Aldrick Rosas kick), 12:36. Giants 7–0. **Drive: 5 plays, 75 yards, 2:24.**
- BUF – Josh Allen 6-yard run (Steven Hauschka kick), 3:43. Tied 7–7. **Drive: 10 plays, 75 yards, 5:46.**

**Second quarter**

- BUF – Devin Singletary 14-yard run (Steven Hauschka kick), 13:24. Bills 14–7. **Drive: 11 plays, 70 yards, 4:15.**
- BUF – Isaiah McKenzie 14-yard pass from Josh Allen (Steven Hauschka kick), 7:30. Bills 21–7. **Drive: 7 plays, 98 yards, 4:26.**

**Third quarter**

- No scoring plays.

**Fourth quarter**

- NYG – T. J. Jones 4-yard pass from Eli Manning (Aldrick Rosas kick), 11:56. Bills 21–14. **Drive: 12 plays, 76 yards, 6:17.**
- BUF – Frank Gore 1-yard run (Steven Hauschka kick), 5:53. Bills 28–14. **Drive: 13 plays, 75 yards, 6:03.**

**Top passers**

- BUF – Josh Allen – 19/30, 253 yards, TD
- NYG – Eli Manning – 26/45, 250 yards, TD, 2 INT

**Top rushers**

- BUF – Frank Gore – 19 rushes, 68 yards, TD
- NYG – Saquon Barkley – 18 rushes, 107 yards, TD

**Top receivers**

- BUF – Cole Beasley – 4 receptions, 83 yards
- NYG – Bennie Fowler III – 5 receptions, 51 yards

With the win, not only did Buffalo earn its first 2–0 start since 2014, but also became the first team to win back-to-back road games in the same stadium since the 2006 Chicago Bears, who ultimately went on to lose Super Bowl XLI to the Indianapolis Colts.

==== Week 3: vs. Cincinnati Bengals ====
Week Three: Cincinnati Bengals at Buffalo Bills – Game summary

Quarter	1	2	3	4	Total
Bengals	0	0	7	10	**17**
**Bills**	8	6	0	7	**21**

at New Era Field, Orchard Park, New York

- Date: September 22
- Game time: 1:00 p.m. EDT
- Game weather: Mostly sunny, 83 °F (28 °C)
- Game attendance: 69,448
- Referee: Clete Blakeman
- TV announcers (CBS): Tom McCarthy and Jay Feely
- Recap, Game Book

Game information

**First quarter**

- BUF – Dawson Knox 1-yard pass from Josh Allen (Josh Allen–Cole Beasley pass), 3:03. Bills 8–0. **Drive: 7 plays, 73 yards, 3:05.**

**Second quarter**

- BUF – Steven Hauschka 34-yard field goal, 10:29. Bills 11–0. **Drive: 10 plays, 46 yards, 5:37.**
- BUF – Steven Hauschka 45-yard field goal, 2:11. Bills 14–0. **Drive: 6 plays, 17 yards, 2:54.**

**Third quarter**

- CIN – Andy Dalton 1-yard run (Randy Bullock kick), 5:50. Bills 14–7. **Drive: 3 plays, 22 yards, 1:22.**

**Fourth quarter**

- CIN – Joe Mixon 1-yard pass from Andy Dalton (Randy Bullock kick), 12:27. Tied 14–14. **Drive: 11 plays, 82 yards, 5:33.**
- CIN – Randy Bullock 43-yard field goal, 4:54. Bengals 17–14. **Drive: 9 plays, 60 yards, 4:12.**
- BUF – Frank Gore 1-yard run (Steven Hauschka kick), 1:50. Bills 21–17. **Drive: 7 plays, 78 yards, 3:04.**

**Top passers**

- CIN – Andy Dalton – 20/36, 249 yards, TD, 2 INT
- BUF – Josh Allen – 23/36, 243 yards, TD, INT

**Top rushers**

- CIN – Joe Mixon – 15 rushes, 61 yards
- BUF – Frank Gore – 14 rushes, 76 yards, TD

**Top receivers**

- CIN – Auden Tate – 6 receptions, 88 yards
- BUF – Dawson Knox – 3 receptions, 67 yards, TD

Buffalo dominated the first half, holding the Bengals offense to just 76 yards and occupying 22:57 of ball possession, compared to just 7:03 for Cincinnati, but were only able to hold a 14–0 lead due to some miscues on offense, including a T. J. Yeldon fumble in the red zone. After Allen threw an interception to the Bengals defense in the third quarter, Cincinnati surged to 17 unanswered points, but Buffalo scored on its final drive, which featured a 49-yard pass from Allen to rookie TE Dawson Knox in which Knox broke two tackles and was capped by a touchdown run by RB Frank Gore. Bengals QB Andy Dalton was intercepted by CB Tre'Davious White for the second time on Cincinnati's ensuing drive, sealing a 21–17 victory for Buffalo. With the win, the Bills earned their first 3–0 start since 2011.

==== Week 4: vs. New England Patriots ====
Week Four: New England Patriots at Buffalo Bills – Game summary

Quarter	1	2	3	4	Total
**Patriots**	13	0	3	0	**16**
Bills	0	3	7	0	**10**

at New Era Field, Orchard Park, New York

- Date: September 29
- Game time: 1:00 p.m. EDT
- Game weather: Mostly cloudy, 58 °F (14 °C)
- Game attendance: 70,317
- Referee: Craig Wrolstad
- TV announcers (CBS): Ian Eagle, Dan Fouts and Evan Washburn
- Recap, Game Book

Game information

**First quarter**

- NE – Brandon Bolden 4-yard run (kick failed, wide right), 7:35. Patriots 6–0. **Drive: 7 plays, 50 yards, 2:57.**
- NE – Matthew Slater 11-yard return of blocked punt (Stephen Gostkowski kick), 6:22. Patriots 13–0.

**Second quarter**

- BUF – Stephen Hauschka 46-yard field goal, 1:55. Patriots 13–3. **Drive: 6 plays, 52 yards, 2:13.**

**Third quarter**

- BUF – Josh Allen 1-yard run (Stephen Hauschka kick), 10:37. Patriots 13–10. **Drive: 9 plays, 75 yards, 4:23.**
- NE – Stephen Gostkowski 23-yard field goal, 0:58. Patriots 16–10. **Drive: 7 plays, 38 yards, 2:59.**

**Fourth quarter**

- No scoring plays.

**Top passers**

- NE – Tom Brady – 18/39, 150 yards, INT
- BUF – Josh Allen – 13/28, 153 yards, 3 INT

**Top rushers**

- NE – Sony Michel – 17 rushes, 63 yards
- BUF – Frank Gore – 17 rushes, 109 yards

**Top receivers**

- NE – James White – 8 receptions, 57 yards
- BUF – Cole Beasley – 7 receptions, 75 yards

The game was a defensive battle, as both Allen and Patriots QB Tom Brady struggled throughout the game. However, the Patriots took an early 13–0 lead following a Brandon Bolden rushing touchdown and a blocked punt returned for a touchdown. After leading the Bills to 10 points, Allen was knocked out of the game in the fourth quarter after sustaining a helmet-to-helmet hit with Patriots CB Jonathan Jones during a scramble. The Patriots defense stifled backup quarterback Matt Barkley, keeping the Bills offense out of the end zone for the rest of the game. With their first loss of the season, the Bills fell to 3–1, failing to earn their first 4–0 start since 2008. On a positive note, Gore became the fourth running back in NFL history to attain 15,000 career rushing yards.

==== Week 5: at Tennessee Titans ====
Week Five: Buffalo Bills at Tennessee Titans – Game summary

Quarter	1	2	3	4	Total
**Bills**	0	7	0	7	**14**
Titans	0	0	7	0	**7**

at Nissan Stadium, Nashville, Tennessee

- Date: October 6
- Game time: 1:00 p.m. EDT/12:00 p.m. CDT
- Game weather: Cloudy, 77 °F (25 °C)
- Game attendance: 66,910
- Referee: Brad Rogers
- TV announcers (CBS): Spero Dedes and Adam Archuleta
- Recap, Game Book

Game information

**First quarter**

- No scoring plays.

**Second quarter**

- BUF – Lee Smith 8-yard pass from Josh Allen (Steven Hauschka kick), 2:36. Bills 7–0. **Drive: 6 plays, 60 yards, 2:46.**

**Third quarter**

- TEN – Derrick Henry 1-yard run (Cairo Santos kick), 7:02. Tied 7–7. **Drive: 7 plays, 38 yards, 3:28.**

**Fourth quarter**

- BUF – Duke Williams 7-yard pass from Josh Allen (Steven Hauschka kick), 9:46. Bills 14–7. **Drive: 6 plays, 77 yards, 2:37.**

**Top passers**

- BUF – Josh Allen – 23/32, 219 yards, 2 TD, INT
- TEN – Marcus Mariota – 13/22, 183 yards

**Top rushers**

- BUF – Frank Gore – 14 rushes, 60 yards
- TEN – Derrick Henry – 20 rushes, 78 yards, TD

**Top receivers**

- BUF – John Brown – 5 receptions, 75 yards
- TEN – Jonnu Smith – 1 reception, 57 yards

In another defensive game, Buffalo scored first with an Allen pass to TE Lee Smith in the second quarter, while Titans QB Marcus Mariota was sacked four times in the first half. The Titans responded in the third quarter with a Derrick Henry rushing touchdown and were on the way to taking the lead in the fourth quarter. However, in a reversal of luck compared to the Music City Miracle from 20 years earlier, the Titans were denied a Mariota passing touchdown when it was determined that Mariota crossed the line of scrimmage prior to making a forward pass. The resulting penalty forced the Titans to settle for a field goal by K Cairo Santos, which was blocked by the Bills defense. Santos wound up missing his other three field goal attempts, finishing 0-for-4 on the day (ultimately leading to his subsequent release). Following the miss, the Bills drove 80 yards down the field, capitalizing with a go-ahead touchdown from Allen to receiver Duke Williams as Tennessee was unable to respond. With the win, Buffalo improved to 4–1 heading into the bye week. WR Zay Jones was traded to the Oakland Raiders the day after this game.

==== Week 7: vs. Miami Dolphins ====
Week Seven: Miami Dolphins at Buffalo Bills – Game summary

Quarter	1	2	3	4	Total
Dolphins	0	14	0	7	**21**
**Bills**	6	3	0	22	**31**

at New Era Field, Orchard Park, New York

- Date: October 20
- Game time: 1:00 p.m. EDT
- Game weather: Mostly sunny, 65 °F (18 °C)
- Game attendance: 68,340
- Referee: Carl Cheffers
- TV announcers (CBS): Andrew Catalon and James Lofton
- Recap, Game Book

Game information

**First quarter**

- BUF – Steven Hauschka 39-yard field goal, 10:54. Bills 3–0. **Drive: 10 plays, 54 yards, 4:06.**
- BUF – Steven Hauschka 43-yard field goal, 3:48. Bills 6–0. **Drive: 7 plays, 45 yards, 3:16.**

**Second quarter**

- MIA – Kalen Ballage 3-yard run (Jason Sanders kick), 14:49. Dolphins 7–6. **Drive: 8 plays, 75 yards, 3:59.**
- BUF – Steven Hauschka 45-yard field goal, 10:06. Bills 9–7. **Drive: 9 plays, 49 yards, 4:43.**
- MIA – DeVante Parker 12-yard pass from Ryan Fitzpatrick (Jason Sanders kick), 5:51. Dolphins 14–9. **Drive: 7 plays, 75 yards, 4:15.**

**Third quarter**

- No scoring plays.

**Fourth quarter**

- BUF – John Brown 20-yard pass from Josh Allen (Josh Allen run), 13:50. Bills 17–14. **Drive: 12 plays, 98 yards, 6:11.**
- BUF – Cole Beasley 3-yard pass from Josh Allen (Steven Hauschka kick), 6:31. Bills 24–14. **Drive: 3 plays, 16 yards, 1:26.**
- MIA – Ryan Fitzpatrick 11-yard run (Jason Sanders kick), 1:45. Bills 24–21. **Drive: 11 plays, 60 yards, 2:14.**
- BUF – Micah Hyde 45-yard kickoff return (Steven Hauschka kick), 1:38. Bills 31–21.

**Top passers**

- MIA – Ryan Fitzpatrick – 23/35, 282 yards, TD, INT
- BUF – Josh Allen – 16/26, 202 yards, 2 TD

**Top rushers**

- MIA – Mark Walton – 14 rushes, 66 yards
- BUF – Frank Gore – 11 rushes, 55 yards

**Top receivers**

- MIA – Preston Williams – 6 receptions, 82 yards
- BUF – John Brown – 5 receptions, 83 yards, TD

Against the winless Dolphins, the Bills trailed at halftime 14–9 following a strong second quarter from Miami QB Ryan Fitzpatrick, who was Buffalo's starter from 2009-2012. The Dolphins looked to extend their lead in the third quarter, but White intercepted Fitzpatrick at the Buffalo 2-yard line. The Bills then regained the lead with two Allen touchdown passes to WRs John Brown and Cole Beasley, respectively, with the latter occurring after White forced the Dolphins to fumble near their 30-yard line. Though the Dolphins scored again later in the fourth quarter, the Bills iced the game after safety Micah Hyde returned Miami's ensuing onside kick for a 45-yard touchdown. With the win, the Bills improved to 5–1 for the first time since 2008.

==== Week 8: vs. Philadelphia Eagles ====
Week Eight: Philadelphia Eagles at Buffalo Bills – Game summary

Quarter	1	2	3	4	Total
**Eagles**	3	8	13	7	**31**
Bills	0	7	6	0	**13**

at New Era Field, Orchard Park, New York

- Date: October 27
- Game time: 1:00 p.m. EDT
- Game weather: Cloudy with showers and wind, 54 °F (12 °C)
- Game attendance: 69,435
- Referee: John Hussey
- TV announcers (Fox): Chris Myers, Daryl Johnston and Laura Okmin
- Recap, Game Book

Game information

**First quarter**

- PHI – Jake Elliott 37-yard field goal, 3:38. Eagles 3–0. **Drive: 9 plays, 54 yards, 4:35.**

**Second quarter**

- BUF – Cole Beasley 14-yard pass from Josh Allen (Stephen Hauschka kick), 14:48. Bills 7–3. **Drive: 10 plays, 75 yards, 3:50.**
- PHI – Dallas Goedert 5-yard pass from Carson Wentz (Miles Sanders run), 0:25. Eagles 11–7. **Drive: 5 plays, 24 yards, 1:28.**

**Third quarter**

- PHI – Miles Sanders 65-yard run (kick failed), 14:02. Eagles 17–7. **Drive: 2 plays, 67 yards, 0:58.**
- BUF – Devin Singletary 28-yard pass from Josh Allen (kick failed), 9:36. Eagles 17–13. **Drive: 10 plays, 75 yards, 4:26.**
- PHI – Boston Scott 4-yard run (Jake Elliott kick), 5:38. Eagles 24–13. **Drive: 6 plays, 68 yards, 3:58.**

**Fourth quarter**

- PHI – Jordan Howard 3-yard run (Jake Elliott kick), 6:12. Eagles 31–13. **Drive: 14 plays, 83 yards, 8:17.**

**Top passers**

- PHI – Carson Wentz – 17/24, 172 yards, TD
- BUF – Josh Allen – 16/34, 169 yards, 2 TD

**Top rushers**

- PHI – Jordan Howard – 23 rushes, 96 yards, TD
- BUF – Josh Allen – 8 rushes, 45 yards

**Top receivers**

- PHI – Alshon Jeffery – 4 receptions, 64 yards
- BUF – John Brown – 5 receptions, 54 yards

During a rain-swept, windy game, the Bills took an early 7–3 lead, but after an Allen fumble shortly before halftime, the Eagles stormed back, outscoring the Bills 28–6 afterwards and finishing with 218 rushing yards under RBs Jordan Howard and Miles Sanders. With the loss, the Bills fall to 5–2. It was the only game all season, including the playoffs, in which the Bills defense allowed more than three touchdowns, or more than 25 points.

==== Week 9: vs. Washington Redskins ====
Week Nine: Washington Redskins at Buffalo Bills – Game summary

Quarter	1	2	3	4	Total
Redskins	0	6	3	0	**9**
**Bills**	10	7	0	7	**24**

at New Era Field, Orchard Park, New York

- Date: November 3
- Game time: 1:00 p.m. EST
- Game weather: Mostly cloudy, 42 °F (6 °C)
- Game attendance: 67,685
- Referee: Tony Corrente
- TV announcers (Fox): Chris Myers, Daryl Johnston and Laura Okmin
- Recap, Game Book

Game information

**First quarter**

- BUF – Cole Beasley 6-yard pass from Josh Allen (Steven Hauschka kick), 8:19. Bills 7–0. **Drive: 8 plays, 54 yards, 3:56.**
- BUF – Steven Hauschka 42-yard field goal, 0:23. Bills 10–0. **Drive: 12 plays, 66 yards, 5:43.**

**Second quarter**

- WAS – Dustin Hopkins 29-yard field goal, 10:42. Bills 10–3. **Drive: 8 plays, 71 yards, 4:41.**
- BUF – Josh Allen 1-yard run (Steven Hauschka kick), 4:45. Bills 17–3. **Drive: 11 plays, 39 yards, 5:57.**
- WAS – Dustin Hopkins 33-yard field goal, 0:32. Bills 17–6. **Drive: 8 plays, 55 yards, 4:13.**

**Third quarter**

- WAS – Dustin Hopkins 39-yard field goal, 1:21. Bills 17–9. **Drive: 6 plays, 14 yards, 3:03.**

**Fourth quarter**

- BUF – Devin Singletary 2-yard run (Steven Hauschka kick), 2:21. Bills 24–9. **Drive: 8 plays, 46 yards, 3:34.**

**Top passers**

- WAS – Dwayne Haskins – 15/22, 144 yards
- BUF – Josh Allen – 14/20, 160 yards, TD

**Top rushers**

- WAS – Adrian Peterson – 18 rushes, 108 yards
- BUF – Devin Singletary – 20 rushes, 95 yards, TD

**Top receivers**

- WAS – Paul Richardson – 4 receptions, 42 yards
- BUF – John Brown – 4 receptions, 76 yards

The Bills won against the Redskins with 140 total yards from rookie RB Devin Singletary, improving to 6–2, making this their best start since 1993, also the same year the Bills last made a Super Bowl.

==== Week 10: at Cleveland Browns ====
Week Ten: Buffalo Bills at Cleveland Browns – Game summary

Quarter	1	2	3	4	Total
Bills	0	7	2	7	**16**
**Browns**	6	3	3	7	**19**

at FirstEnergy Stadium, Cleveland, Ohio

- Date: November 10
- Game time: 1:00 p.m. EST
- Game weather: Sunny, 50 °F (10 °C)
- Game attendance: 67,431
- Referee: Ronald Torbert
- TV announcers (CBS): Andrew Catalon, James Lofton and Amanda Balionis
- Recap, Game Book

Game information

**First quarter**

- CLE – Jarvis Landry 17-yard pass from Baker Mayfield (kick failed, wide right), 12:09. Browns 6–0. **Drive: 6 plays, 75 yards, 2:51.**

**Second quarter**

- BUF – Josh Allen 10-yard run (Stephen Hauschka kick), 10:09. Bills 7–6. **Drive: 9 plays, 76 yards, 4:40.**
- CLE – Austin Seibert 27-yard field goal, 3:35. Browns 9–7. **Drive: 13 plays, 69 yards, 6:34.**

**Third quarter**

- BUF – Baker Mayfield sacked in end zone by Tremaine Edmunds for a safety, 10:53. Tied 9–9.
- CLE – Austin Seibert 47-yard field goal, 3:49. Browns 12–9. **Drive: 10 plays, 56 yards, 5:01.**

**Fourth quarter**

- BUF – Josh Allen 1-yard run (Stephen Hauschka kick), 5:26. Bills 16–12. **Drive: 7 plays, 48 yards, 3:44.**
- CLE – Rashard Higgins 7-yard pass from Baker Mayfield (Austin Seibert kick), 1:44. Browns 19–16. **Drive: 10 plays, 82 yards, 3:42.**

**Top passers**

- BUF – Josh Allen – 22/41, 266 yards
- NYJ – Baker Mayfield – 26/38, 238 yards, 2 TD

**Top rushers**

- BUF – Devin Singletary – 8 rushes, 42 yards
- NYJ – Nick Chubb – 20 rushes, 116 yards

**Top receivers**

- BUF – John Brown – 5 receptions, 77 yards
- NYJ – Jarvis Landry – 9 receptions, 97 yards, TD

In a game featuring a showdown between Allen and fellow 2018 draftee Baker Mayfield, Cleveland scored first with a Mayfield touchdown pass to Jarvis Landry and dominated the time of possession in the first half, but the Bills defense provided two goal-line stands in the second quarter, causing a turnover on downs and limiting the Browns to a field goal, respectively. Allen passed for a career-high 266 yards and had two rushing scores, the second of which gave Buffalo a 16–12 lead late in the fourth quarter, but Mayfield then drove Cleveland down the field to retake the lead with a touchdown pass to Rashard Higgins. The Bills drove to the Cleveland 35-yard line on the ensuing drive, but K Stephen Hauschka missed the potential game-tying field goal attempt, sealing the loss for Buffalo and dropping them to 6–3 on the season.

==== Week 11: at Miami Dolphins ====
Week Eleven: Buffalo Bills at Miami Dolphins – Game summary

Quarter	1	2	3	4	Total
**Bills**	6	17	7	7	**37**
Dolphins	0	14	0	6	**20**

at Hard Rock Stadium, Miami Gardens, Florida

- Date: November 17
- Game time: 1:00 p.m. EST
- Game weather: Cloudy, 62 °F (17 °C)
- Game attendance: 64,187
- Referee: Scott Novak
- TV announcers (CBS): Spero Dedes and Adam Archuleta
- Recap, Game Book

Game information

**First quarter**

- BUF – Stephen Hauschka 51-yard field goal, 12:04. Bills 3–0. **Drive: 7 plays, 42 yards, 2:56.**
- BUF – Stephen Hauschka 34-yard field goal, 4:29. Bills 6–0. **Drive: 11 plays, 27 yards, 5:17.**

**Second quarter**

- BUF – John Brown 40-yard pass from Josh Allen (Stephen Hauschka kick), 13:09. Bills 13–0. **Drive: 5 plays, 81 yards, 2:12.**
- BUF – Stephen Hauschka 21-yard field goal, 7:41. Bills 16–0. **Drive: 7 plays, 62 yards, 3:21.**
- MIA – Kalen Ballage 3-yard run (Jason Sanders kick), 3:39. Bills 16–7. **Drive: 5 plays, 68 yards, 1:57.**
- BUF – Dawson Knox 23-yard pass from Josh Allen (Stephen Hauschka kick), 1:23. Bills 23–7. **Drive: 6 plays, 75 yards, 2:10.**
- MIA – Jakeem Grant 101-yard kickoff return (Jason Sanders kick), 1:09. Bills 23–14.

**Third quarter**

- BUF – Josh Allen 8-yard run (Stephen Hauschka kick), 6:55. Bills 30–14. **Drive: 9 plays, 53 yards, 4:53.**

**Fourth quarter**

- MIA – Jakeem Grant 7-yard run (pass failed), 14:35. Bills 30–20. **Drive: 7 plays, 65 yards, 3:46.**
- BUF – John Brown 9-yard pass from Josh Allen (Stephen Hauschka kick), 10:38. Bills 37–20. 'Drive: 8 plays, 62 yards, 3:57.**3:57.**

**Top passers**

- BUF – Josh Allen – 21/33, 256 yards, 3 TD
- MIA – Ryan Fitzpatrick – 32/45, 323 yards

**Top rushers**

- BUF – Devin Singletary – 15 rushes, 75 yards
- MIA – Kalen Ballage – 9 rushes, 9 yards, TD

**Top receivers**

- BUF – John Brown – 9 receptions, 137 yards, 2 TD
- MIA – DeVante Parker – 7 receptions, 135 yards

In the rematch against Miami, the Bills defense sacked Fitzpatrick seven times and limited the Dolphins to 23 rushing yards, but the special teams unit allowed a 101-yard kickoff return touchdown from Dolphins KR Jakeem Grant and an onside kick. Offensively, Allen and Brown posted strong performances as the Bills cruised to over 400 total yards and Hauschka rebounded from his poor performance in Cleveland, making all three of his field goals with a long of 51 yards. With the dominating win, Buffalo improved to 7–3, improving on their 6–10 record from 2018.

==== Week 12: vs. Denver Broncos ====
Week Twelve: Denver Broncos at Buffalo Bills – Game summary

Quarter	1	2	3	4	Total
Broncos	0	0	3	0	**3**
**Bills**	3	3	7	7	**20**

at New Era Field, Orchard Park, New York

- Date: November 24
- Game time: 1:00 p.m. EST
- Game weather: Cloudy, 40 °F (4 °C)
- Game attendance: 67,338
- Referee: Jerome Boger
- TV announcers (CBS): Kevin Harlan, Rich Gannon and Jay Feely
- Recap, Game Book

Game information

**First quarter**

- BUF – Steven Hauschka 39-yard field goal, 1:10. Bills 3–0. **Drive: 17 plays, 69 yards, 8:49.**

**Second quarter**

- BUF – Steven Hauschka 23-yard field goal, 8:09. Bills 6–0. **Drive: 12 plays, 87 yards, 5:50.**

**Third quarter**

- BUF – Cole Beasley 18-yard pass from Josh Allen (Steven Hauschka kick), 12:57. Bills 13–0. **Drive: 8 plays, 59 yards, 2:03.**
- DEN – Brandon McManus 45-yard field goal, 7:40. Bills 13–3. **Drive: 10 plays, 48 yards, 5:17.**

**Fourth quarter**

- BUF – John Brown 34-yard pass from Josh Allen (Steven Hauschka kick), 11:08. Bills 20–3. **Drive: 2 plays, 31 yards, 0:46.**

**Top passers**

- DEN – Brandon Allen – 10/25, 82 yards, INT
- BUF – Josh Allen – 15/25, 185 yards, 2 TD, INT

**Top rushers**

- DEN – Phillip Lindsay – 13 rushes, 57 yards
- BUF – Devin Singletary – 21 rushes, 106 yards

**Top receivers**

- DEN – Courtland Sutton – 1 reception, 27 yards
- BUF – Cole Beasley – 6 receptions, 76 yards, TD

Against a strong Broncos defense, Allen's streak of games without throwing an interception came to an end at five, as he threw one to Broncos S Justin Simmons in the second quarter. Nonetheless, Allen still passed for two touchdowns and Buffalo's rushing offense recorded 244 yards. RBs Singletary and Gore each hit notable milestones, as Singletary recorded his first career 100-yard rushing game and Gore surpassed Barry Sanders on the NFL's all-time rushing list, taking over third place for career rushing yards. Defensively, the Bills had another strong performance and shut down the Denver offense, limiting the Broncos to just 134 net yards and a 45-yard field goal midway through the third quarter in addition to sacking QB Brandon Allen four times. The Bills improved to 8–3 with the win.

==== Week 13: at Dallas Cowboys ====
Thanksgiving Day Game

Week Thirteen: Buffalo Bills at Dallas Cowboys – Game summary

Quarter	1	2	3	4	Total
**Bills**	0	13	10	3	**26**
Cowboys	7	0	0	8	**15**

at AT&T Stadium, Arlington, Texas

- Date: November 28
- Game time: 4:30 p.m. EST/3:30 p.m. CST
- Game weather: None (retractable roof closed)
- Game attendance: 90,445
- Referee: Bill Vinovich
- TV announcers (CBS): Jim Nantz, Tony Romo and Tracy Wolfson
- Recap, Game Book

Game information

**First quarter**

- DAL – Jason Witten 8-yard pass from Dak Prescott (Brett Maher kick), 10:34. Cowboys 7–0. **Drive: 9 plays, 75 yards, 4:26**

**Second quarter**

- BUF – Cole Beasley 25-yard pass from Josh Allen (Stephen Hauschka kick), 8:01. Tied 7–7. **Drive: 8 plays, 85 yards, 4:26.**
- BUF – Devin Singletary 28-yard pass from John Brown (kick failed, wide right), 1:52. Bills 13–7. **Drive: 5 plays, 39 yards, 1:28.**

**Third quarter**

- BUF – Stephen Hauschka 41-yard field goal, 10:47. Bills 16–7. **Drive: 8 plays, 48 yards, 4:13.**
- BUF – Josh Allen 15-yard run (Stephen Hauschka kick), 3:37. Bills 23–7. **Drive: 7 plays, 63 yards, 4:00.**

**Fourth quarter**

- BUF – Stephen Hauschka 26-yard field goal, 8:20. Bills 26–7. **Drive: 13 plays, 86 yards, 7:02.**
- DAL – Ventell Bryant 15-yard pass from Dak Prescott (Dak Prescott pass to Jason Witten), 4:01. Bills 26–15. **Drive: 5 plays, 70 yards, 1:27.**

**Top passers**

- BUF – Josh Allen – 19/24, 231 yards, TD
- DAL – Dak Prescott – 32/49, 355 yards, 2 TD, INT

**Top rushers**

- BUF – Devin Singletary – 14 rushes, 63 yards
- DAL – Ezekiel Elliott – 12 rushes, 71 yards

**Top receivers**

- BUF – Cole Beasley – 6 receptions, 110 yards, TD
- DAL – Amari Cooper – 8 receptions, 85 yards

Buffalo traveled to Dallas for its first Thanksgiving game since 1994, when they lost 35–21 to the Detroit Lions. Despite an opening-drive touchdown pass from Cowboys QB Dak Prescott to TE Jason Witten, the Bills defense kept the Cowboys' top-ranked offense out of the end zone for the rest of the first half and most of the second half and forced two turnovers from Prescott. The Bills would respond in the second quarter when Beasley, making his first return to Dallas since signing with Buffalo in free agency, caught a 25-yard touchdown pass from Allen. They took the lead for good when they scored on a trick play 28-yard pass from Brown to Singletary just before halftime. Buffalo wound up scoring 26 unanswered points before allowing a 15-yard touchdown pass from Prescott to Ventell Bryant in garbage time. With the 26–15 win, the Bills improved to 9–3, clinching just their fourth winning season since 1999. Additionally, this was the first time since 1975 that the Bills won the Thanksgiving game.

==== Week 14: vs. Baltimore Ravens ====
Week Fourteen: Baltimore Ravens at Buffalo Bills – Game summary

Quarter	1	2	3	4	Total
**Ravens**	3	7	7	7	**24**
Bills	0	6	3	8	**17**

at New Era Field, Orchard Park, New York

- Date: December 8
- Game time: 1:00 p.m. EST
- Game weather: Windy, 43 °F (6 °C)
- Game attendance: 69,134
- Referee: Shawn Smith
- TV announcers (CBS): Ian Eagle, Dan Fouts and Evan Washburn
- Recap, Game Book

Game information

**First quarter**

- BAL – Justin Tucker 36-yard field goal, 4:56. Ravens 3–0. **Drive: 8 plays, 27 yards, 4:20.**

**Second quarter**

- BAL – Nick Boyle 3-yard pass from Lamar Jackson (Justin Tucker kick), 13:31. Ravens 10–0. **Drive: 5 plays, 24 yards, 2:25.**
- BUF – Stephen Hauschka 36-yard field goal, 8:20. Ravens 10–3. **Drive: 11 plays, 55 yards, 5:11.**
- BUF – Stephen Hauschka 47-yard field goal, 0:25. Ravens 10–6. **Drive: 7 plays, 20 yards, 1:33.**

**Third quarter**

- BAL – Hayden Hurst 61-yard pass from Lamar Jackson (Justin Tucker kick), 13:34. Ravens 17–6. **Drive: 3 plays, 75 yards, 1:26.**
- BUF – Stephen Hauschka 48-yard field goal, 11:26. Ravens 17–9. **Drive: 7 plays, 51 yards, 2:08.**

**Fourth quarter**

- BAL – Willie Snead 4-yard pass from Lamar Jackson (Justin Tucker kick), 9:49. Ravens 24–9. **Drive: 9 plays, 51 yards, 5:02.**
- BUF – Cole Beasley 4-yard pass from Josh Allen (Josh Allen–Cole Beasley pass), 7:00. Ravens 24–17. **Drive: 7 plays, 78 yards, 2:49.**

**Top passers**

- BAL – Lamar Jackson – 16/25, 145 yards, 3 TD, INT
- BUF – Josh Allen – 17/39, 146 yards, TD

**Top rushers**

- BAL – Mark Ingram II – 15 rushes, 50 yards
- BUF – Devin Singletary – 18 rushes, 89 yards

**Top receivers**

- BAL – Hayden Hurst – 3 receptions, 73 yards, TD
- BUF – Dawson Knox – 1 reception, 37 yards

Against the top-ranked Ravens and MVP candidate Lamar Jackson, the Bills defense limited the Ravens to less than 100 total yards in the first half with an interception of Jackson, but the Ravens defense likewise limited the Bills offense, scoring a touchdown after forcing Allen to fumble deep in Bills territory. Baltimore took a commanding 17–6 lead three plays into the third quarter after Jackson found TE Hayden Hurst for a 61-yard touchdown through blown coverage and extended their lead with a long touchdown drive following a Bills field goal and a missed pass interference call after Ravens CB Jimmy Smith pushed Bills WR Robert Foster in the back. Buffalo would respond with an Allen touchdown pass to Beasley and successful two-point conversion and had one final chance to tie the game after penalties by Baltimore, but the drive stalled at the Baltimore 18-yard line when CB Marcus Peters batted down the ball with just over a minute to go, sealing a 24–17 loss that dropped the Bills to 9–4.

==== Week 15: at Pittsburgh Steelers ====
Week Fifteen: Buffalo Bills at Pittsburgh Steelers – Game summary

Quarter	1	2	3	4	Total
**Bills**	0	7	0	10	**17**
Steelers	0	3	7	0	**10**

at Heinz Field, Pittsburgh, Pennsylvania

- Date: December 15
- Game time: 8:20 p.m. EST
- Game weather: Cloudy, 31 °F (−1 °C)
- Game attendance: 64,694
- Referee: Tony Corrente
- TV announcers (NBC): Al Michaels, Cris Collinsworth and Michele Tafoya
- Recap, Game Book

Game information

**First quarter**

- No scoring plays.

**Second quarter**

- BUF – Josh Allen 1-yard run (Stephen Hauschka kick), 14:22. Bills 7–0. **Drive: 9 plays, 40 yards, 4:23.**
- PIT – Chris Boswell 49-yard field goal, 11:26. Bills 7–3. **Drive: 6 plays, 41 yards, 2:56.**

**Third quarter**

- PIT – James Conner 11-yard pass from Devlin Hodges (Chris Boswell kick), 11:18. Steelers 10–7. **Drive: 7 plays, 69 yards, 3:42.**

**Fourth quarter**

- BUF – Stephen Hauschka 36-yard field goal, 12:23. Tied 10–10. **Drive: 7 plays, 0 yards, 4:01.**
- BUF – Tyler Kroft 14-yard pass from Josh Allen (Stephen Hauschka kick), 7:55. Bills 17–10. **Drive: 6 plays, 70 yards, 2:08.**

**Top passers**

- BUF – Josh Allen – 13/25, 139 yards, TD, INT
- PIT – Devlin Hodges – 23/38, 202 yards, TD, 4 INT

**Top rushers**

- BUF – Devin Singletary – 21 rushes, 87 yards
- PIT – James Conner – 8 rushes, 42 yards

**Top receivers**

- BUF – John Brown – 7 receptions, 99 yards
- PIT – James Washington – 5 receptions, 83 yards

This game was originally scheduled to air at 1:00pm ET on CBS, but during the New England Patriots–Houston Texans primetime game in Week 13, it was announced that the game would be flexed to 8:20pm ET on NBC. This marked the first Sunday primetime game for the Bills since 2007, when they hosted the Patriots (who were attempting to complete a perfect 16–0 regular season) and lost 56–10. The Bills won the defense-heavy game 17–10 as Brown led the Bills offense with 99 receiving yards. Defensively, the Bills forced five turnovers, including four interceptions of Steelers quarterback Devlin Hodges. This win snapped a six-game losing streak against the Steelers dating back to 1999, and was the Bills’ first win at Pittsburgh since 1993.

With the win, Buffalo improved to 10–4, clinching both a playoff berth and its first season with 10 or more wins since 1999.

==== Week 16: at New England Patriots ====
Week Sixteen: Buffalo Bills at New England Patriots – Game summary

Quarter	1	2	3	4	Total
Bills	3	7	7	0	**17**
**Patriots**	7	3	3	11	**24**

at Gillette Stadium, Foxborough, Massachusetts

- Date: December 21
- Game time: 4:30 p.m. EST
- Game weather: Cloudy and cool, 33 °F (1 °C)
- Game attendance: 65,878
- Referee: John Hussey
- TV announcers (NFLN): Mike Tirico, Kurt Warner and Peter Schrager
- Recap, Game Book

Game information

**First quarter**

- BUF – Stephen Hauschka 35-yard field goal, 9:16. Bills 3–0. **Drive: 7 plays, 14 yards, 3:15.**
- NE – Matt LaCosse 8-yard pass from Tom Brady (Nick Folk kick), 1:50. Patriots 7–3. **Drive: 11 plays, 75 yards, 7:20.**

**Second quarter**

- NE – Nick Folk 36-yard field goal, 5:04. Patriots 10–3. **Drive: 17 plays, 81 yards, 8:58.**
- BUF – Dion Dawkins 1-yard pass from Josh Allen (Stephen Hauschka kick), 0:01. Tied 10–10. **Drive: 6 plays, 59 yards, 0:32.**

**Third quarter**

- NE – Nick Folk 51-yard field goal, 9:54. Patriots 13–10. **Drive: 7 plays, 44 yards, 3:16.**
- BUF – John Brown 53-yard pass from Josh Allen (Stephen Hauschka kick), 7:25. Bills 17–13. **Drive: 5 plays, 64 yards, 2:23.**

**Fourth quarter**

- NE – Nick Folk 20-yard field goal, 10:45. Bills 17–16. **Drive: 11 plays, 77 yards, 6:40.**
- NE – Rex Burkhead 1-yard run (Tom Brady–Julian Edelman pass), 5:06. Patriots 24–17. **Drive: 7 plays, 59 yards, 3:55.**

**Top passers**

- BUF – Josh Allen – 13/26, 208 yards, 2 TD
- NE – Tom Brady – 26/33, 271 yards, TD

**Top rushers**

- BUF – Devin Singletary – 15 rushes, 46 yards
- NE – Sony Michel – 21 rushes, 96 yards

**Top receivers**

- BUF – Cole Beasley – 7 receptions, 108 yards
- NE – Julian Edelman – 5 receptions, 72 yards

Despite New England holding the ball for much of the first half, Buffalo tied it up at halftime after stopping a fourth-down conversion, then subsequently marching down the field in 38 seconds and capitalizing with a Josh Allen touchdown pass to offensive tackle Dion Dawkins. The second half saw the Bills and Patriots alternate leads, with the Patriots scoring a go-ahead touchdown late in the fourth quarter with a Rex Burkhead touchdown run and subsequent two-point conversion. Similar to the game against the Ravens, Buffalo then drove down the field into the redzone on its final possession, but was unable to score the game-tying touchdown as the drive stalled at the New England 14-yard line. With the loss, the Bills fell to 10–5 and allowed New England to clinch the divisional title.

Later in the weekend, the other AFC teams contending for Wild Card spots in the playoffs, namely the Pittsburgh Steelers and the Tennessee Titans, both lost to fall to 8–7. With only one game remaining, neither team could reach 10 wins and match the Bills' win total. Therefore, the Bills clinched the #5 seed and a road game against the #4 seed in the AFC playoffs. As of 2025, that is the last time Buffalo failed to defeat New England.

==== Week 17: vs. New York Jets ====
Week Seventeen: New York Jets at Buffalo Bills – Game summary

Quarter	1	2	3	4	Total
**Jets**	0	3	0	10	**13**
Bills	0	0	3	3	**6**

at New Era Field, Orchard Park, New York

- Date: December 29
- Game time: 1:00 p.m. EST
- Game weather: Rain, 43 °F (6 °C)
- Game attendance: 69,016
- Referee: Brad Rogers
- TV announcers (CBS): Tom McCarthy and Jay Feely
- Recap, Game Book

Game information

**First quarter**

- No scoring plays

**Second quarter**

- NYJ - Sam Ficken 30-yard field goal, 10:54. Jets 3–0. **Drive: 11 plays, 71 yards, 5:29)**

**Third quarter**

- BUF - Stephen Hauschka 28-yard field goal, 1:29. Tied 3–3. **Drive: 16 plays, 77 yards, 8:11.**

**Fourth quarter**

- NYJ - Jamison Crowder 1-yard pass from Sam Darnold (Sam Ficken kick), 13:31. Jets 10–3. **Drive: 9 plays, 75 yards, 2:58.**
- NYJ - Sam Ficken 47-yard field goal, 2:05. Jets 13–3. **Drive: 7 plays, 13 yards, 3:12.**
- BUF - Stephen Hauschka 29-yard field goal, 0:47. Jets 13–6. **Drive: 8 plays, 67 yards, 1:18.**

**Top passers**

- BUF – Matt Barkley – 18/35, 232 yards, 2 INT
- NYJ – Sam Darnold – 23/36, 199 yards, TD, INT

**Top rushers**

- BUF – Isaiah McKenzie – 2 rushes, 30 yards
- NYJ – Le'Veon Bell – 16 rushes, 41 yards

**Top receivers**

- BUF – Duke Williams – 6 receptions, 108 yards
- NYJ – Jamison Crowder – 8 receptions, 66 yards, TD

The Bills' final regular season game against the Jets had no implications for their playoff seeding, as they had already locked up the #5 seed in the AFC. After initially announcing that many starters would play, head coach Sean McDermott limited playing time for many players in order to rest up for the playoffs. The Bills played many of their reserves for much of the game, leading to a low-scoring contest which the Jets were able to win, 13–6.

=== Standings ===
==== Division ====
AFC East
	W	L	T	PCT	DIV	CONF	PF	PA	STK
^{(3)} New England Patriots	12	4	0	.750	5–1	8–4	420	225	L1
^{(5)} Buffalo Bills	10	6	0	.625	3–3	7–5	314	259	L2
New York Jets	7	9	0	.438	2–4	4–8	276	359	W2
Miami Dolphins	5	11	0	.313	2–4	4–8	306	494	W2

==== Conference ====
AFC
#	Team	Division	W	L	T	PCT	DIV	CONF	SOS	SOV	STK
**Division leaders**
1	Baltimore Ravens	North	14	2	0	.875	5–1	10–2	.494	.484	W12
2 (Note: Kansas City claimed the No. 2 seed over New England based on head-to-head victory.)	Kansas City Chiefs	West	12	4	0	.750	6–0	9–3	.510	.477	W6
3	New England Patriots	East	12	4	0	.750	5–1	8–4	.469	.411	L1
4	Houston Texans	South	10	6	0	.625	4–2	8–4	.520	.488	L1
**Wild Cards**
5	Buffalo Bills	East	10	6	0	.625	3–3	7–5	.461	.363	L2
6	Tennessee Titans	South	9	7	0	.563	3–3	7–5	.488	.465	W1
**Did not qualify for the postseason**
7	Pittsburgh Steelers	North	8	8	0	.500	3–3	6–6	.502	.324	L3
8 (Note: Denver finished ahead of Indianapolis and NY Jets based on conference record. Division tiebreak was initially used to eliminate Oakland (see below).) (Note: Denver finished ahead of Oakland based on conference record.)	Denver Broncos	West	7	9	0	.438	3–3	6–6	.510	.406	W2
9 (Note: Oakland and Indianapolis finished ahead of NY Jets based on conference record.) (Note: Oakland finished ahead of Indianapolis based on head-to-head victory.)	Oakland Raiders	West	7	9	0	.438	3–3	5–7	.482	.335	L1
10	Indianapolis Colts	South	7	9	0	.438	3–3	5–7	.492	.500	L1
11	New York Jets	East	7	9	0	.438	2–4	4–8	.473	.402	W2
12 (Note: Jacksonville finished ahead of Cleveland based on record against common opponents. Jacksonville's cumulative record against Cincinnati, Denver, NY Jets, and Tennessee was 4–1, compared to Cleveland's 2–3 cumulative record against the same four teams.)	Jacksonville Jaguars	South	6	10	0	.375	2–4	6–6	.484	.406	W1
13	Cleveland Browns	North	6	10	0	.375	3–3	6–6	.533	.479	L3
14 (Note: LA Chargers finished ahead of Miami based on head-to-head victory.)	Los Angeles Chargers	West	5	11	0	.313	0–6	3–9	.514	.488	L3
15	Miami Dolphins	East	5	11	0	.313	2–4	4–8	.484	.463	W2
16	Cincinnati Bengals	North	2	14	0	.125	1–5	2–10	.553	.406	W1
**Tiebreakers** (Note: When breaking ties for three or more teams under the NFL's rules, they are first broken within divisions, then comparing only the highest ranked remaining team from each division.)

== Postseason ==
=== Schedule ===
Round	Date	Opponent (seed)	Result	Record	Venue	Recap
Wild Card	January 4, 2020	at Houston Texans (4)	L 19–22 (OT)	0–1	NRG Stadium	Recap

=== Game summaries ===
==== AFC Wild Card Playoffs: at (4) Houston Texans ====
AFC Wild Card Playoffs: (5) Buffalo Bills at (4) Houston Texans – Game summary

Quarter	1	2	3	4	OT	Total
Bills	7	6	3	3	0	19
Texans	0	0	8	11	3	22

at NRG Stadium, Houston, Texas

- Date: January 4, 2020
- Game time: 4:35 p.m. EST/3:35 p.m. CST
- Game weather: None (retractable roof closed)
- Game attendance: 71,699
- Referee: Tony Corrente
- TV announcers (ESPN/ABC): Joe Tessitore, Booger McFarland and Lisa Salters
- Recap, Game Book

Game information

First quarter

- BUF – Josh Allen 16-yard pass from John Brown (Stephen Hauschka kick), 11:41. Bills 7–0. Drive: 6 plays, 75 yards, 3:19.

Second quarter

- BUF – Stephen Hauschka 40-yard field goal, 10:47. Bills 10–0. Drive: 11 plays, 69 yards, 4:45.
- BUF – Stephen Hauschka 40-yard field goal, 0:04. Bills 13–0. Drive: 15 plays, 74 yards, 5:41.

Third quarter

- BUF – Stephen Hauschka 38-yard field goal, 6:02. Bills 16–0. Drive: 8 plays, 18 yards, 3:57.
- HOU – Deshaun Watson 20-yard run (Watson run), 1:33. Bills 16–8. Drive: 9 plays, 75 yards, 4:29.

Fourth quarter

- HOU – Kaʻimi Fairbairn 41-yard field goal, 10:55. Bills 16–11. Drive: 6 plays, 27 yards, 3:16.
- HOU – Carlos Hyde 5-yard pass from Deshaun Watson (Watson pass to Hopkins), 4:37. Texans 19–16. Drive: 8 plays, 74 yards, 4:52.
- BUF – Stephen Hauschka 47-yard field goal, 0:05. Tied 19–19. Drive: 11 plays, 41 yards, 1:11.

Overtime

- HOU – Kaʻimi Fairbairn 28-yard field goal, 3:20. Texans 22–19. Drive: 9 plays, 73 yards, 5:42.

Top passers

- BUF – Josh Allen – 24/46, 264 yards
- HOU – Deshaun Watson – 20/25, 247 yards, TD

Top rushers

- BUF – Josh Allen – 9 rushes, 92 yards
- HOU – Deshaun Watson – 14 rushes, 55 yards, TD

Top receivers

- BUF – Devin Singletary – 6 receptions, 76 yards
- HOU – DeAndre Hopkins – 6 receptions, 90 yards

In their third consecutive playoff game against the AFC South, the Bills jumped out to an early lead including a trick play touchdown from receiver John Brown to Josh Allen on their first drive, and were able to contain Texans quarterback Deshaun Watson in the first half. The Bills expanded their lead to 16–0 in the third quarter before the Texans came back with three straight scores to take a 19–16 lead. After exchanging turnovers on downs, the Bills were able to get the ball back with just over a minute remaining and set up a field goal to force the game into overtime. Both teams punted on their first possession of overtime, although the Bills had made it into field goal range, they were pushed back by a blindside block penalty on offensive lineman Cody Ford, forcing the punt. On the ensuing drive, the Texans advanced to the Bills' 44 yard line where, facing 2nd & 6, Watson escaped multiple Bills defenders to avoid a sack, and completed a pass to former Bill Taiwan Jones to the Bills' 10 yard line, setting up the game-winning field goal kicked by Kaʻimi Fairbairn with 3:20 remaining in overtime. The Bills were eliminated with the loss, and the Texans advanced to play the Kansas City Chiefs in the divisional round.
