= John Brown (wide receiver) =

American football player (born 1990)

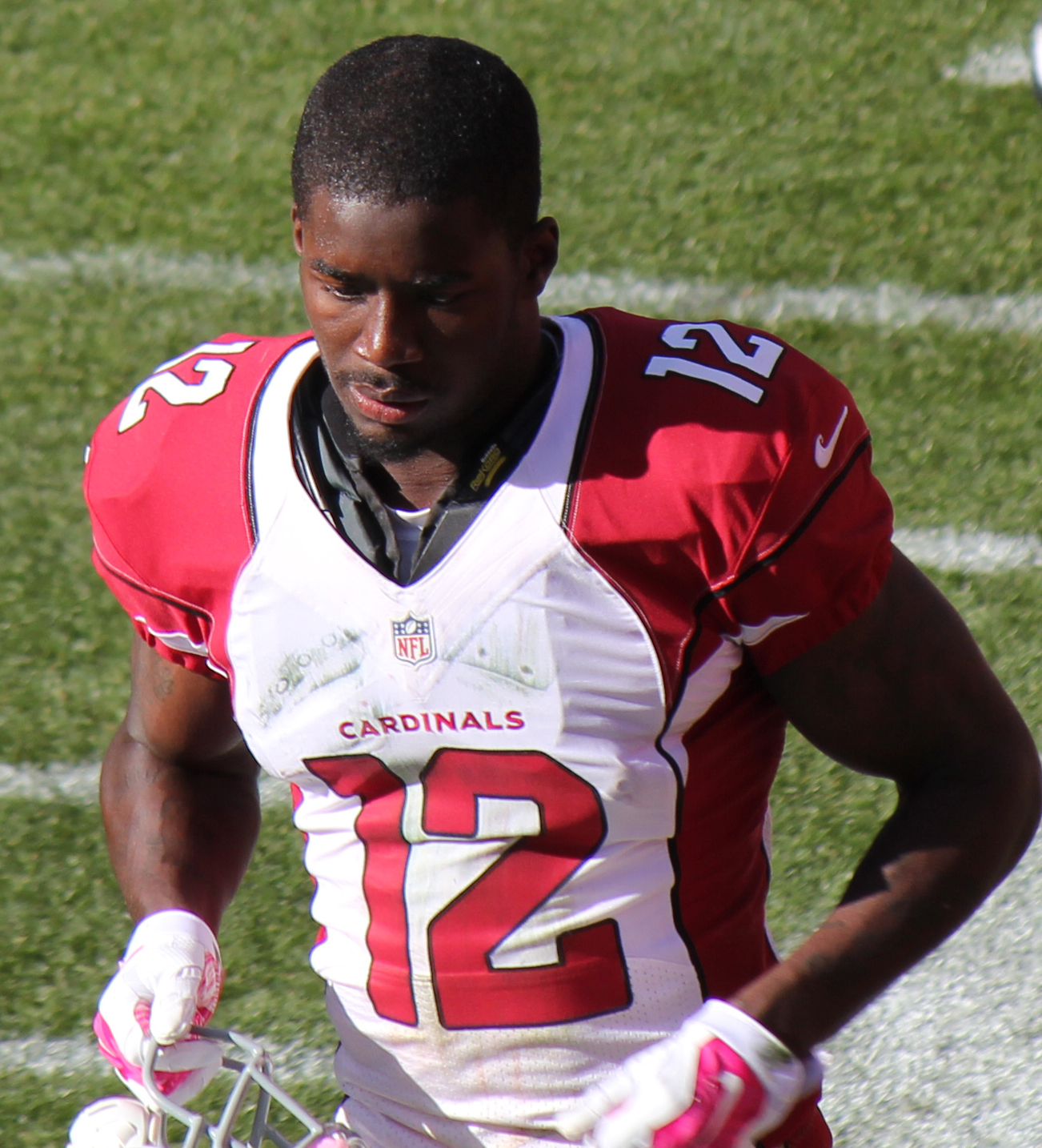
- Brown with the Arizona Cardinals in 2014

No. 12, 13, 15, 16, 17, 89
- Position: Wide receiver

Personal information
- Born: April 3, 1990 (age 36); Homestead, Florida, U.S.
- Listed height: 5 ft 10 in (1.78 m)
- Listed weight: 178 lb (81 kg)

Career information
- High school: Homestead
- College: Mars Hill (2008); Coffeyville (2010); Pittsburg State (2011–2013)
- NFL draft: 2014: 3rd round, 91st overall pick

Career history
- Arizona Cardinals (2014–2017); Baltimore Ravens (2018); Buffalo Bills (2019–2020); Las Vegas Raiders (2021)*; Denver Broncos (2021); Jacksonville Jaguars (2021); Tampa Bay Buccaneers (2021); Buffalo Bills (2022)
- * Offseason or practice squad member only

Awards and highlights
- Ickey Woods Award (2014); 3× Little All-American (2011–2013); 3× First-team All-MIAA (2011–2013); SAC Freshman of the Year (2009)

Career NFL statistics
- Receptions: 321
- Receiving yards: 4,790
- Receiving touchdowns: 32
- Stats at Pro Football Reference

John Brown (born April 3, 1990), nicknamed "Smokey" or "Smoke," is an American former professional football player who was a wide receiver in the National Football League (NFL). He played college football for the Pittsburg State Gorillas and was selected by the Arizona Cardinals in the third round of the 2014 NFL draft. He also played for the Baltimore Ravens, Buffalo Bills, Denver Broncos, Jacksonville Jaguars, and Tampa Bay Buccaneers.

== Early life ==
A native of Homestead, Florida, Brown attended Homestead High School, where he played high school football. He was named an All-Dade County selection as a senior in 2007.

== College career ==
=== Mars Hill ===
In 2008, Brown enrolled at Mars Hill College in Mars Hill, North Carolina. Brown was named the South Atlantic Conference (SAC) Freshman of the Year, after catching 27 passes for 619 yards and seven touchdowns while leading the team with 1,472 all-purpose yards. Due to academic troubles, he sat out the 2009 season before transferring to Coffeyville Community College in 2010, but he was redshirted.

Unable to play at Coffeyville, Brown considered a transfer to MidAmerica Nazarene University, where his half-brother James Walker had played. Before Brown and Walker could play together, however, Walker was shot multiple times in July 2010 and died in April 2011 from his injuries. Walker's ailing condition and eventual demise motivated Brown to keep playing football despite his past hardships, and he eventually earned a scholarship to play for Pittsburg State University.

=== Pittsburg State ===
In 2011, he was a second-team Associated Press (AP) Little All-American as all-purpose player while leading Pittsburg State to the NCAA Division II National Championship. He was named first-team All-Mid-America Intercollegiate Athletics Association (MIAA) as kick returner and second-team All-MIAA as a wide receiver after he led his team with 61 receptions for 1,216 yards and 12 touchdowns. In 2012, he was named a first-team AP Little All-American as an all-purpose player, and first-team All-MIAA as kick returner and wide receiver. He was named the MIAA and the NCAA Division II National Special Teams Player of the Year. Brown started 10 games and led team with 63 receptions for 973 yards and eight touchdowns. In 2013, he was named 2013 MIAA Special Teams Player of the Year as well as the NCAA Division II National Special Teams Player of the Year. He was also named a second-team AP Little All-American as all-purpose player and first-team All-MIAA player as kick returner and wide receiver. He caught 61 passes for 1,198 yards and 14 touchdowns.

He finished as Pitt State’s all-time leader in receptions (185), receiving yards (3,380) and receiving touchdowns (34). His 3,380 receiving yards ranks fifth in MIAA history. Between receiving, rushing and return yards, Brown finished his career with 7,716 all-purpose yards, 6,244 at Pitt State.

== Professional career ==
Pre-draft measurables
Height	Weight	Arm length	Hand span	40-yard dash	10-yard split	20-yard split	20-yard shuttle	Three-cone drill	Vertical jump	Broad jump	Bench press
5 ft 10 in (1.78 m)	179 lb (81 kg)	30 1/2 in (0.77 m)	8 1/2 in (0.22 m)	4.34 s	1.56 s	2.55 s	4.12 s	6.91 s	36.5 in (0.93 m)	9 ft 11 in (3.02 m)	8 reps
All values from NFL Combine/Pro Day

=== Arizona Cardinals ===
==== 2014 season ====
Brown was selected by the Arizona Cardinals in the third round (91st overall) of the 2014 NFL draft. Brown was the first Pittsburg State Gorilla drafted since Ronald Moore in 1993.

In his debut for the Arizona Cardinals, Brown caught his first professional touchdown on a 13-yard pass from Carson Palmer against the San Diego Chargers in Week 1 of the 2014 season. He followed that performance with his first multi-touchdown game two weeks later against the San Francisco 49ers. On October 26, 2014, he caught a 75-yard game-winning touchdown pass to beat the Philadelphia Eagles. In Week 10 of the 2014 NFL season, Brown became the first rookie in NFL history to have four-game-winning touchdowns in a season. Brown finished the season with 48 receptions on 103 targets for 696 yards and five touchdowns. An injury to the Cardinal's quarterback, Palmer, caused a sharp decline in the team's offense. On January 3, 2015, in the NFC Wild Card Round against the Carolina Panthers, on the game's final offensive play, Brown was the final recipient of a multiple lateral play which lost 20 yards. The loss caused the Cardinals to finish the game with just 78 total offensive yards, the lowest total in NFL playoff history which broke a 56-year-old league record.

==== 2015 season ====
Brown and the Cardinals enjoyed a terrific season, finishing the regular season at 13–3. Brown concluded the regular season with 65 receptions on 101 targets for 1,003 yards and seven touchdowns. The Cardinals ultimately lost in the NFC Championship to the Panthers.

==== 2016 season ====
Plagued with hamstring issues throughout the season, Brown posted 39 receptions on 72 targets for 517 yards and two touchdowns in 2016.

==== 2017 season ====
Brown's 2017 season was also plagued with injuries, dealing with quadriceps, back, and toe injuries. He played in 10 games with five starts, recording 21 catches for 299 yards and three touchdowns.

=== Baltimore Ravens ===
On March 13, 2018, Brown signed a one-year, $5 million contract with the Baltimore Ravens.

After scoring his first Ravens touchdown in the season-opener against the Buffalo Bills, he would go on to record 92 yards and his second touchdown (a 21-yard reception) against the Cincinnati Bengals the next game. In Week 4, against the Pittsburgh Steelers, he recorded three receptions for 116 yards and a touchdown in the victory. He finished the season with 42 receptions for a team-leading 715 yards and five touchdowns.

=== Buffalo Bills (first stint) ===
==== 2019 season ====
On March 13, 2019, Brown signed a three-year, $27 million contract with the Bills.

During the season opener against the New York Jets on September 8, 2019, Brown finished with seven receptions for 123 yards, including the go-ahead 38-yard touchdown reception in a 17–16 win after trailing 16–0. In a Week 7 matchup against the Miami Dolphins, Brown caught a go-ahead touchdown from Josh Allen in the fourth quarter, giving Buffalo a 17–14 lead. The Bills would go on to win 31–21 as Brown caught five passes for 83 yards and the touchdown. During the rematch with the Dolphins in Week 11, Brown finished with 137 receiving yards and two touchdowns as the Bills won 37–20. During the Thanksgiving Series against the Dallas Cowboys in Week 13, Brown completed one pass for a 28 yard touchdown to rookie running back Devin Singletary. Brown also finished with 26 receiving yards himself as the Bills won 26–15. During a 17–10 Week 15 win over the Steelers, Brown helped the Bills to victory with seven catches for 99 yards, as the Bills clinched a playoff berth for the second time in three seasons. In Week 16 against the New England Patriots, Brown caught one pass for a 53-yard touchdown during the 24–17 loss. Brown's touchdown reception was the first one allowed by All-Pro cornerback Stephon Gilmore all season. Overall, he finished the 2019 season with 72 receptions for 1,060 receiving yards and six receiving touchdowns.

In the AFC Wild Card Round against the Houston Texans, Brown caught four passes for 50 yards and threw a 16-yard touchdown pass to Josh Allen during the 22–19 overtime loss.

==== 2020 season ====
In a season opening 27–17 victory over the Jets, Brown was targeted ten times, catching six passes for 70 yards and a touchdown. In his third game of the year, Brown suffered an injury to his calf. In Week 10, Brown suffered a high ankle sprain and was placed on injured reserve on November 28, 2020. He was activated from injured reserve and subsequently placed on the reserve/COVID-19 list by the team on December 28, 2020. He was activated from the COVID list four days later. He played in Buffalo's season finale against the Dolphins, catching four passes for 72 yards a one touchdown in Buffalo's 56–26 win. Overall, Brown finished the 2020 season with 33 receptions for 458 receiving yards and three receiving touchdowns.

In the Divisional Round of the playoffs, Brown received eight receptions for a total of 62 yards in the 17–3 victory over the Ravens.

On March 10, 2021, Brown was released by the Bills.

=== Las Vegas Raiders ===
On March 19, 2021, Brown signed a one-year contract with the Las Vegas Raiders. He was released on August 31, 2021.

=== Denver Broncos ===
On October 12, 2021, the Denver Broncos signed Brown to their practice squad. He was released on October 26, 2021.

=== Jacksonville Jaguars ===
On November 8, 2021, the Jacksonville Jaguars signed Brown to their practice squad. He was released on November 29, 2021.

=== Tampa Bay Buccaneers ===
On January 13, 2022, the Tampa Bay Buccaneers signed Brown to their practice squad. On January 22, 2022, he was elevated to the active roster. His contract expired when the team’s season ended on January 23, 2022.

=== Buffalo Bills (second stint) ===
On November 26, 2022, Brown returned to the Bills, signing to the practice squad. In Week 18 against the New England Patriots, Brown caught a 42–yard touchdown pass as his first, and only, catch of the season. His practice squad contract with the team expired after the season on January 22, 2023.

== NFL career statistics ==
=== Regular season ===
Year	Team	Games		Receiving					Rushing					Passing					Fumbles	
Year	Team	GP	GS	Rec	Yds	Avg	Lng	TD	Att	Yds	Avg	Lng	TD	Cmp	Att	Yds	Avg	TD	Fum	Lost
2014	ARI	16	5	48	696	14.5	75T	5	3	−6	−2	2	0	0	0	0	0.0	0	0	0
2015	ARI	15	11	65	1,003	15.4	68	7	3	22	7.3	13	0	0	0	0	0.0	0	1	1
2016	ARI	15	6	39	517	13.3	30	2	1	10	10	10	0	0	0	0	0.0	0	1	0
2017	ARI	10	5	21	299	14.2	52	3	1	10	10.0	10	0	0	0	0	0.0	0	0	0
2018	BAL	16	15	42	715	17.0	71	5	3	4	1.3	3	0	0	0	0	0.0	0	0	0
2019	BUF	15	15	72	1,060	14.7	53	6	2	7	3.5	4	0	1	1	28	28.0	1	0	0
2020	BUF	9	8	33	458	13.9	46	3	0	0	0	0	0	0	0	0	0.0	0	0	0
2021	DEN	2	0	0	0	0.0	0	0	0	0	0	0	0	0	0	0	0.0	0	0	0
2021	JAX	2	0	0	0	0.0	0	0	0	0	0	0	0	0	0	0	0.0	0	0	0
2021	TB	0	0	0	0	0.0	0	0	0	0	0	0	0	0	0	0	0.0	0	0	0
2022	BUF	3	0	1	42	42.0	42	1	0	0	0	0	0	0	0	0	0.0	0	0	0
Total		103	65	321	4,790	14.9	75	32	13	47	3.6	13	0	1	1	28	28.0	1	2	1

=== Playoffs ===
Year	Team	Games		Receiving					Rushing					Passing					Fumbles	
Year	Team	GP	GS	Rec	Yds	Avg	Lng	TD	Att	Yds	Avg	Lng	TD	Cmp	Att	Yds	Avg	TD	Fum	Lost
2014	ARI	1	0	4	34	8.5	21	0	0	0	0	0	0	0	0	0	0.0	0	0	0
2015	ARI	2	2	7	105	15.0	21	0	1	2	2.0	2	0	0	0	0	0.0	0	0	0
2018	BAL	1	1	2	14	7.0	9	0	0	0	0	0	0	0	0	0	0.0	0	0	0
2019	BUF	1	1	4	50	12.5	28	0	0	0	0	0	0	1	1	16	16.0	1	0	0
2020	BUF	3	3	10	86	8.6	21	0	0	0	0	0	0	0	0	0	0.0	0	0	0
2021	TB	1	0	0	0	0.0	0	0	0	0	0	0	0	0	0	0	0.0	0	0	0
2022	BUF	2	0	0	0	0.0	0	0	0	0	0	0	0	0	0	0	0.0	0	0	0
Total		11	7	27	289	10.7	28	0	1	2	2.0	2	0	1	1	16	16.0	1	0	0

== Personal life ==
All of Brown's family and friends refer to him by his nickname, Smokey. The name was bestowed on him at birth by the boyfriend of his grandmother. “She nicknamed me Smokey because when I first came out, I was blacker than what I am now,” Brown said, referring to his skin color. “Most people are like, ‘Why they call you Smokey? Because you are fast?’ But no.”

Brown was diagnosed with sickle cell trait in 2016 after suffering from soreness in his hamstrings. He insisted a cyst on his spine he had treated during the 2016 season was the root cause of his leg issues and that the sickle cell trait will not affect his football career.
