= Cody Ford =

American football player (born 1996)

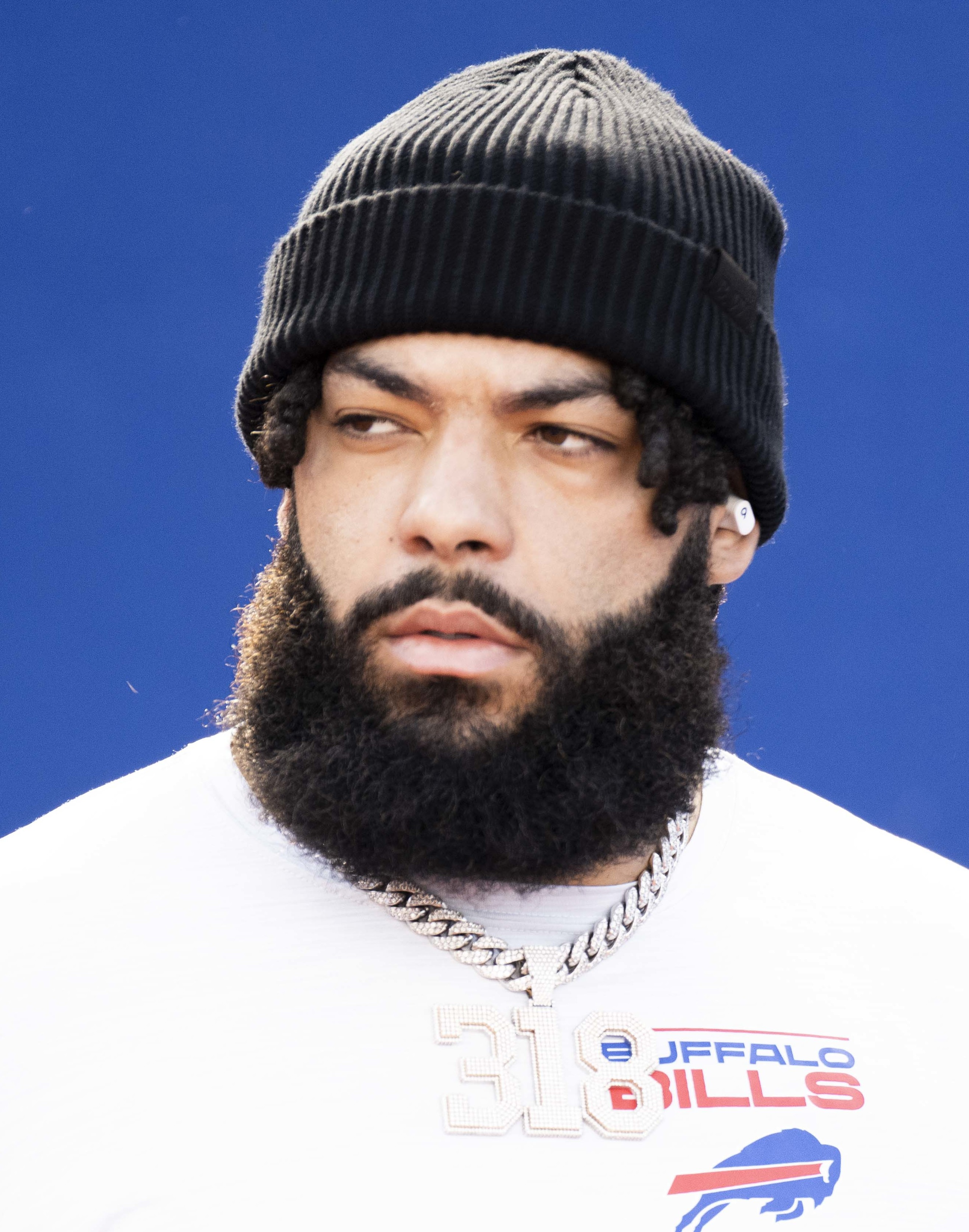
- Ford with the Buffalo Bills in 2021

Profile
- Position: Offensive tackle

Personal information
- Born: December 28, 1996 (age 29); Pineville, Louisiana, U.S.
- Listed height: 6 ft 3 in (1.91 m)
- Listed weight: 345 lb (156 kg)

Career information
- High school: Pineville
- College: Oklahoma (2015–2018)
- NFL draft: 2019: 2nd round, 38th overall pick

Career history
- Buffalo Bills (2019–2021); Arizona Cardinals (2022); Cincinnati Bengals (2023–2025)

Awards and highlights
- Third-team All-American (2018); First-team All-Big 12 (2018)

Career NFL statistics as of Week 14, 2025
- Games played: 95
- Games started: 42
- Stats at Pro Football Reference

Cody Ford (born December 28, 1996) is an American professional football offensive tackle. He played college football for the Oklahoma Sooners. He has played in the NFL for the Buffalo Bills, Arizona Cardinals and Cincinnati Bengals.

== College career ==
During his recruitment process, Ford originally committed to TCU before flipping to the Oklahoma Sooners. After redshirting for the 2015 season, Ford started the first 3 games of 2016 for Oklahoma before suffering a broken fibula against Ohio State and missing the rest of the season. During the 2018 season, Ford was named a third-team All-American as part of an offensive line that won the Joe Moore Award. Following this season, Ford announced that he would be declaring for the 2019 NFL draft. When he declared, Ford was ranked as the number 3 guard available by NFL draft analyst Mel Kiper Jr.

== Professional career ==
Pre-draft measurables
Height	Weight	Arm length	Hand span	Wingspan	40-yard dash	10-yard split	20-yard split	20-yard shuttle	Three-cone drill	Vertical jump	Broad jump	Bench press
6 ft 3 3/4 in (1.92 m)	329 lb (149 kg)	34 in (0.86 m)	9 3/4 in (0.25 m)	6 ft 10 1/2 in (2.10 m)	5.21 s	1.81 s	3.02 s	4.80 s	8.27 s	28.5 in (0.72 m)	8 ft 8 in (2.64 m)	20 reps
All values from NFL Combine/Pro Day

=== Buffalo Bills ===
==== 2019 ====
Ford was selected by the Buffalo Bills in the second round with the 38th overall pick in the 2019 NFL draft.

Ford alternated between playing at guard and tackle during his rookie year, but saw more time at tackle after starter Ty Nsekhe suffered an ankle injury. During Buffalo's Wild Card Round playoff loss against the Houston Texans, Ford was called for an illegal blindside block as the Bills were driving into field goal range in overtime. The penalty played a part in Buffalo losing the game and has been seen as controversial. After Ford was later fined $28,075 by the league for the block, numerous Bills fans donated on GoFundMe in an attempt to help Ford cover the costs.

==== 2020 ====
Ford entered the 2020 season as the Bills starting right guard. He moved over to left guard in Week 3 in place of Quinton Spain. He started the next four games there, before missing three of the next four games. Prior to Week 12, Ford suffered a torn meniscus in practice and was placed on injured reserve on November 28.

=== Arizona Cardinals ===
On August 22, 2022, the Bills traded Ford to the Arizona Cardinals for a 2023 fifth-round pick. On September 10, 2022, he was placed on injured reserve after injuring his ankle at practice. He was activated on October 20.

=== Cincinnati Bengals ===
On March 16, 2023, Ford signed a one-year contract with the Cincinnati Bengals. He made the initial 53-man roster as the backup left guard to Cordell Volson. He made his first start with the Bengals in Week 12 against the Pittsburgh Steelers.

On March 9, 2024, Ford signed a one-year contract extension with the Bengals. He was named a backup for the season, starting nine games as an injury fill-in at both tackle and guard.

On March 10, 2025, Ford signed a two-year contract extension with the Bengals. In a December 28 victory over the Arizona Cardinals, Ford's birthday, he recorded his first career catch on a 21-yard reception from Joe Burrow.

On August 24, 2026, Ford was released by the Bengals.

== Personal life ==
In January 2023, Ford debuted his relationship with TikTok star Tianna Robillard. In April 2024, Ford and his girlfriend got engaged. Robillard posted a clip of her being led to a candle-filled room, where Ford was waiting. In June 2024, Ford and Robillard called off their engagement. Robillard shared a video on June 12, 2024, in which she tearfully told viewers that the pair had split, adding that some things are unrecoverable. Since the breakup, the former couple have deleted photos of each other from their social media accounts.
