= Devin Singletary =

American football player (born 1997)

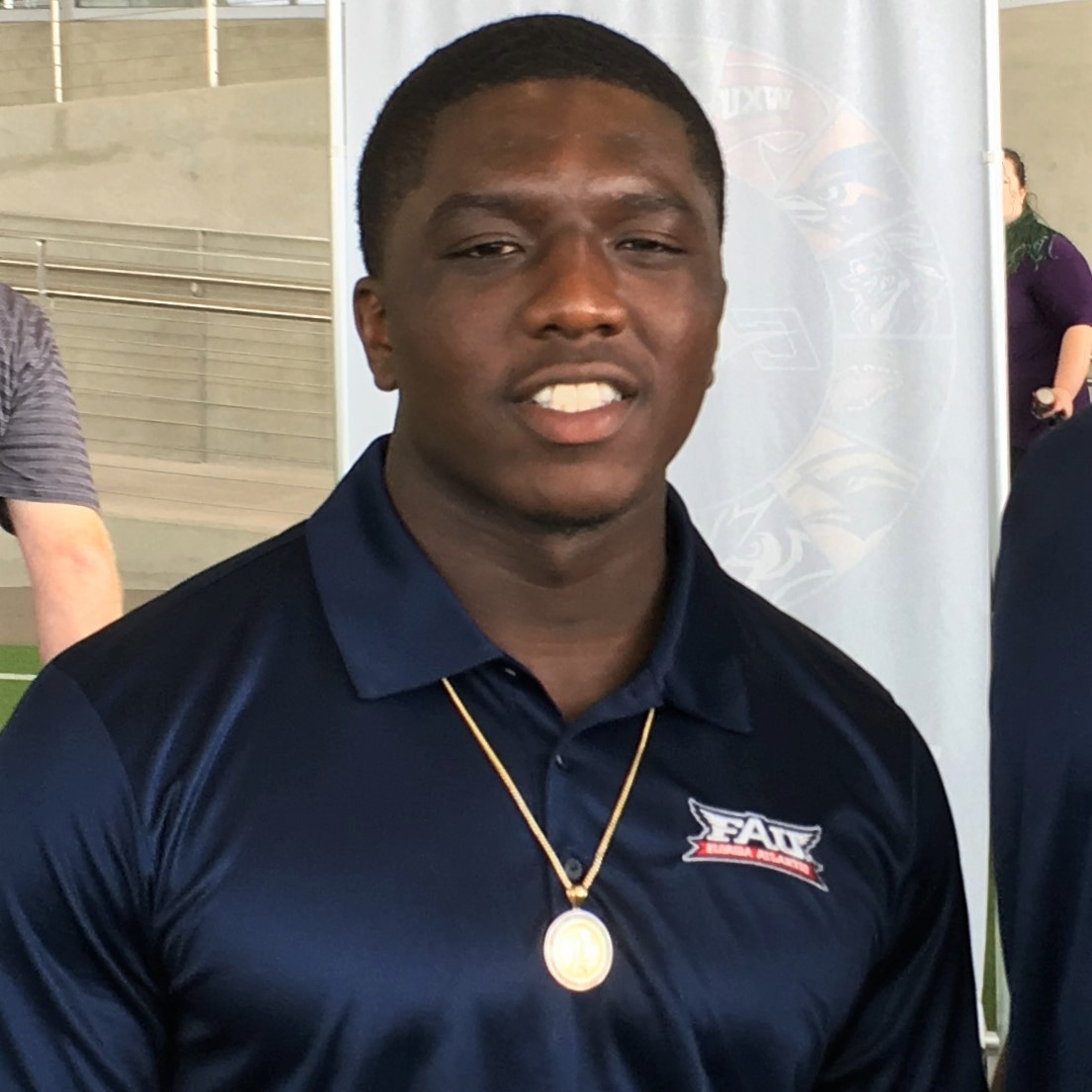
- Singletary in 2018

No. 26 – New York Giants
- Positions: Running back, kickoff returner
- Roster status: Active

Personal information
- Born: September 3, 1997 (age 29); Deerfield Beach, Florida, U.S.
- Listed height: 5 ft 7 in (1.70 m)
- Listed weight: 203 lb (92 kg)

Career information
- High school: American Heritage (FL)
- College: Florida Atlantic (2016–2018)
- NFL draft: 2019: 3rd round, 74th overall pick

Career history
- Buffalo Bills (2019–2022); Houston Texans (2023); New York Giants (2024–present)

Awards and highlights
- Second-team All-American (2018); Third-team All-American (2017); NCAA rushing touchdowns leader (2017); NCAA scoring leader (2017); C-USA Most Valuable Player (2017); 2× First-team All-C-USA (2017, 2018)

Career NFL statistics as of Week 10, 2026
- Rushing yards: 5,037
- Rushing average: 4.3
- Rushing touchdowns: 30
- Receptions: 224
- Receiving yards: 1,497
- Receiving touchdowns: 5
- Return yards: 425
- Stats at Pro Football Reference

Devin Singletary (born September 3, 1997), nicknamed "Motor", is an American professional football running back and kickoff returner for the New York Giants of the National Football League (NFL). He played college football for the Florida Atlantic Owls. As a sophomore in 2017, he led all Division I FBS players with 32 rushing touchdowns, 33 combined rushing and receiving touchdowns, and 198 points scored, and finished with 1,920 rushing yards. He was selected by the Buffalo Bills in the third round of the 2019 NFL draft. He has also played for the Houston Texans.

== Early life ==
Singletary attended and played high school football at American Heritage School in Delray Beach, Florida. He became a three-star recruit and amassed 4,975 rushing yards during his high school career, earning two First-Team All-State selections, before choosing to go to Florida Atlantic University. Singletary's childhood nickname "Motor", which he shared with his father, Jebedial-Danielson Singletary along with uncle Lil’Jordan Humphrey, stuck with him during his high school football years.

== College career ==
During the 2016 season, he rushed for 1,021 yards on 152 carries for an average of 6.7 yards per carry, gaining 12 touchdowns.

As a sophomore in 2017, he rushed for 244 yards against Western Kentucky and 203 yards against Marshall. During the 2017 regular season, he led all Football Bowl Subdivision (FBS) players with 162 points scored (27 touchdowns) and ranked fourth with 1,632 rushing yards. He also set the Florida Atlantic single-season record for rushing yardage.

On December 2, 2017, in the Conference USA championship game against North Texas, Singletary rushed for an 164 yards and three touchdowns. He added three more touchdowns in the Owls' 50–3 blowout of Akron in the 2017 Boca Raton Bowl, raising his total touchdown count for the year to 33 (32 rushing, 1 receiving). He was selected as a semifinalist for the Doak Walker Award and was named third-team All-American by the Associated Press.

The following season, Singletary rushed for 1,348 yards on 261 attempts with 22 touchdowns. He was named a second-team All-American by Sporting News for his performance. On December 12, 2018, Singletary announced his intention to enter the 2019 NFL draft, finishing his college career as FAU's all-time rusher and with the sixth-most rushing touchdowns in FBS history.

== Professional career ==
Pre-draft measurables
Height	Weight	Arm length	Hand span	Wingspan	40-yard dash	10-yard split	20-yard split	20-yard shuttle	Three-cone drill	Vertical jump	Broad jump	Bench press
5 ft 7 1/2 in (1.71 m)	203 lb (92 kg)	28 7/8 in (0.73 m)	8 1/2 in (0.22 m)	5 ft 10 in (1.78 m)	4.66 s	1.53 s	2.73 s	4.40 s	7.32 s	35 in (0.89 m)	9 ft 9 in (2.97 m)	15 reps
All values from NFL Combine

=== Buffalo Bills ===
==== 2019 ====
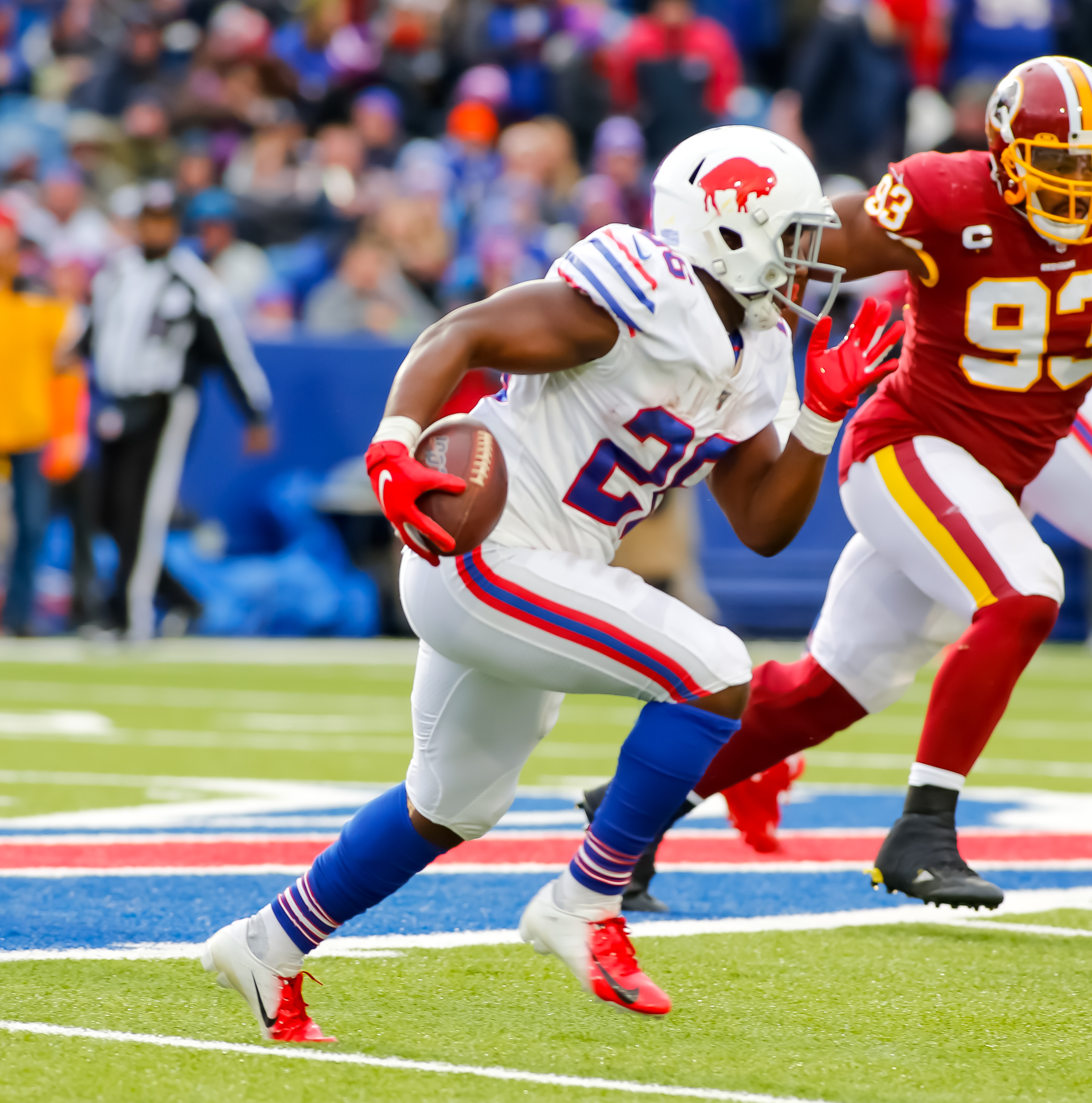
Singletary in a game against the Washington Redskins

Singletary was selected by the Buffalo Bills with the 74th overall pick in the third round of the 2019 NFL draft. He joined a backfield with veterans LeSean McCoy, Frank Gore, and T. J. Yeldon, but earned a prominent role with the Bills after McCoy was released as part of final preseason cuts.

On September 8, 2019, Singletary made his professional debut for the Bills. He finished the game against the New York Jets with 70 rushing yards on four carries, in addition to five receptions for 28 yards as the Bills won 17–16. Singletary scored his first NFL rushing touchdown one week later, during a 28–14 win over the New York Giants. He finished with 57 rushing yards on six carries prior to leaving with a hamstring injury. In Week 9 against the Washington Redskins, Singletary had his breakout game rushing for 95 yards on 20 carries with one touchdown and 45 yards receiving on three receptions in the 24–9 win. In Week 13 against the Dallas Cowboys on Thanksgiving Day, Singletary rushed 14 times for 63 yards and caught three passes for 38 yards, including a 28-yard touchdown reception from wide receiver John Brown, in the 26–15 win. Overall, he finished the 2019 season with 151 carries for 775 rushing yards and two rushing touchdowns to go along with 29 receptions for 194 receiving yards and two receiving touchdowns.

==== 2020 ====
With the departure of veteran power back Frank Gore in free agency, Buffalo drafted Zack Moss in the 2020 NFL draft to complement Singletary's elusive running style. Singletary split carries with Moss throughout the season, but finished as Buffalo's top rusher in 2020. He attained 687 yards and two touchdowns on 156 carries, with his longest run being a 51-yard touchdown against the Denver Broncos in Week 15, and also caught 38 passes for 269 yards. He also fumbled the ball just once, compared to four times during his rookie season.

==== 2021 ====
Singletary scored his first touchdown of the season in week 2 against the Miami Dolphins, a 46-yard run, in which he reached a top speed of 20.29 miles per hour according to NFL NextGen Stats. His touchdown was the first for Buffalo in the game, as the Bills wound up winning 35–0. Throughout the first three months of the season, Singletary shared the backfield with Moss and free agent acquisition Matt Breida to middling results behind a poor run-blocking offensive line, before he was made the primary halfback. Between weeks 14 and 18, he accrued at least 78 yards from scrimmage against the Tampa Bay Buccaneers, Carolina Panthers, New England Patriots, Atlanta Falcons, and Jets. Singletary's 23 carries against Atlanta resulted in 110 yards and 2 touchdowns, both career-highs for a single game. He scored two touchdowns again versus the Jets, with one on the ground and one receiving. In the 2021 season, Singletary finished with 188 carries for 870 rushing yards and seven rushing touchdowns to go along with 40 receptions for 228 receiving yards and one receiving touchdown in 17 appearances and 16 starts.

In the playoffs, Singletary rushed for two touchdowns in a 47–17 win over the Patriots during the Wild Card Round, also scoring the first touchdown of the Divisional round game against the Kansas City Chiefs, which Buffalo lost 42–36 in overtime.

==== 2022 ====
The Bills drafted running back James Cook prior to the season, but despite a now-crowded backfield, Singletary remained the top back on the roster. Singletary's first touchdown from scrimmage in the 2022 season came on a two-yard pass from Josh Allen during a week 3 game against the Dolphins. His first two rushing touchdowns of the season came during a 33–30 overtime loss to the Minnesota Vikings, but he also lost a fumble during the game. In Week 16, against the Chicago Bears, he had 12 carries for 106 yards and a touchdown in the 35–13 victory. In the 2022 season, Singletary had 177 carries for 819 rushing yards and five rushing touchdowns to go along with 38 receptions for 280 receiving yards and one receiving touchdown.

=== Houston Texans ===
On March 21, 2023, Singletary signed a one-year contract with the Houston Texans.

Singletary began the 2023 season as the No. 2 running back to Dameon Pierce. In Week 4 against the Pittsburgh Steelers, he threw a touchdown pass to Dalton Schultz as part of a trick play. After an injury to Pierce, Singletary got the start in Week 10, and rushed for a career-high 150 rushing yards and a touchdown in a 30–27 win over the Cincinnati Bengals, earning AFC Offensive Player of the Week. In Week 15 against the Titans, he had 170 scrimmage yards in the 19–16 win. He finished the 2023 season with 216 carries for 898 rushing yards and four rushing touchdowns to go with 30 receptions for 193 receiving yards.

=== New York Giants ===
On March 14, 2024, Singletary signed a three-year, $16.5 million contract with the New York Giants. During Week 5, Singletary did not play due to injury, which allowed rookie Tyrone Tracy Jr. to eventually take over as starter due to him impressing the coaching staff, including head coach Brian Daboll. He finished the 2024 season with 113 carries for 437 rushing yards and four rushing touchdowns to go with 21 receptions for 119 receiving yards.

Singletary finished the 2025 season with 119 carries for 437 yards and five touchdowns to go with 18 receptions for 151 yards.

== Career statistics ==
=== NFL ===
Legend
**Bold**	Career best

==== Regular season ====
Year	Team	Games		Rushing					Receiving					Fumbles	
Year	Team	GP	GS	Att	Yds	Y/A	Lng	TD	Rec	Yds	Y/R	Lng	TD	Fum	Lost
2019	BUF	12	8	151	775	**5.1**	38	2	29	194	6.7	**49**	**2**	4	1
2020	BUF	16	**16**	156	687	4.4	**51T**	2	38	269	7.1	34	0	1	1
2021	BUF	**17**	**16**	188	870	4.6	46T	**7**	**40**	228	5.7	19	1	5	**0**
2022	BUF	16	**16**	177	819	4.6	33T	5	38	**280**	7.4	22	1	3	3
2023	HOU	**17**	10	**216**	**898**	4.2	24	4	30	193	6.4	41	0	1	**0**
2024	NYG	15	5	113	437	3.9	43	4	21	119	5.7	23	0	2	2
2025	NYG	**17**	1	119	437	3.7	29	5	18	151	**8.4**	41	0	**0**	**0**
2026	NYG	6	1	40	114	2.9	30	1	10	63	6.3	19	0	**0**	**0**
Career		116	73	1,160	5,037	4.3	51T	30	224	1,497	6.7	49	4	16	7

==== Postseason ====
Year	Team	Games		Rushing					Receiving					Fumbles	
Year	Team	GP	GS	Att	Yds	Y/A	Lng	TD	Rec	Yds	Y/R	Lng	TD	Fum	Lost
2019	BUF	1	1	13	58	4.5	18	0	6	**76**	**12.7**	**38**	0	0	0
2020	BUF	**3**	**2**	16	63	3.9	13	0	**8**	44	5.5	14	0	0	0
2021	BUF	2	**2**	**26**	**107**	4.1	16	**3**	7	38	5.4	15	0	0	0
2022	BUF	2	**2**	16	73	**4.6**	13	0	5	37	7.4	16	0	0	0
2023	HOU	2	**2**	22	88	4.0	**29**	1	**8**	52	6.5	26	0	0	0
Career		10	9	93	389	4.2	29	4	34	247	7.3	38	0	0	0

=== College ===
Legend
	Led the NCAA
**Bold**	Career high

Season	Team	GP	Rushing						Receiving					
Season	Team	GP	Att	Yds	Avg	Lng	TD	Y/G	Rec	Yds	Avg	Lng	TD	Y/G
2016	FAU	12	152	1,021	**6.7**	66T	12	84.7	**26**	163	6.3	48	0	13.6
2017	FAU	14	**301**	**1,918**	6.4	**70T**	**32**	**147.7**	19	**198**	**10.4**	**60T**	**1**	**15.2**
2018	FAU	12	261	1,348	5.2	44T	22	112.3	6	36	6.0	13	0	3.0
Total		38	714	4,287	6.0	70	66	115.8	51	397	7.8	60	1	10.7
