= Quinton Spain =

American football player (born 1991)

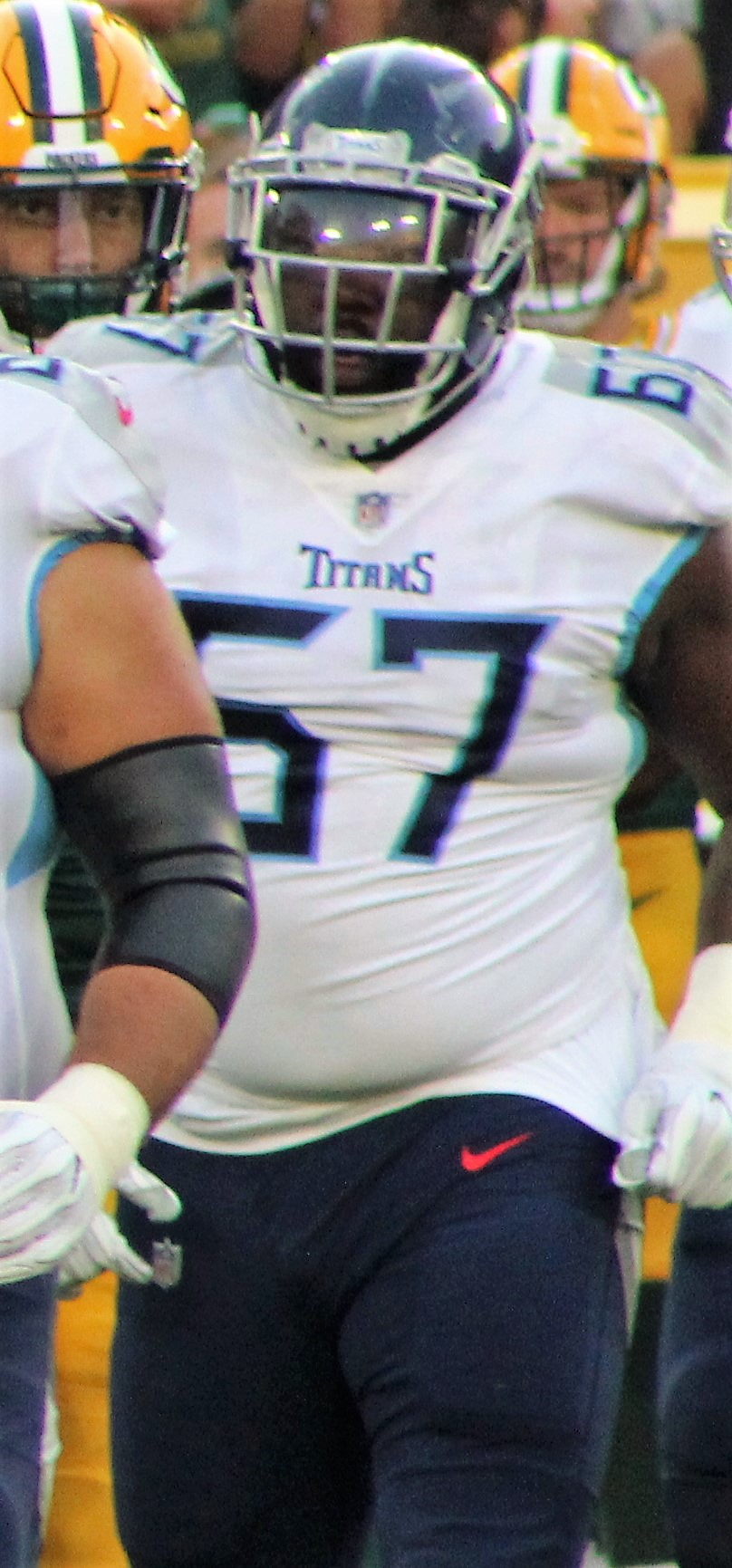
- Spain with the Tennessee Titans in 2018

No. 60, 67
- Position: Guard

Personal information
- Born: August 7, 1991 (age 35); Petersburg, Virginia, U.S.
- Listed height: 6 ft 4 in (1.93 m)
- Listed weight: 330 lb (150 kg)

Career information
- High school: Petersburg
- College: West Virginia
- NFL draft: 2015: undrafted

Career history
- Tennessee Titans (2015–2018); Buffalo Bills (2019–2020); Cincinnati Bengals (2020–2021)

Awards and highlights
- Second-team All-Big 12 (2013)

Career NFL statistics
- Games played: 95
- Games started: 90
- Stats at Pro Football Reference

Quinton Lamar Spain (born August 7, 1991) is an American former professional football player who was a guard in the National Football League (NFL). He played college football for the West Virginia Mountaineers and was signed by the Tennessee Titans as an undrafted free agent in 2015.

== Professional career ==
Pre-draft measurables
Height	Weight	Arm length	Hand span	40-yard dash	10-yard split	20-yard split	20-yard shuttle	Three-cone drill	Vertical jump	Broad jump	Bench press
6 ft 4 1/8 in (1.93 m)	330 lb (150 kg)	35 in (0.89 m)	9 3/4 in (0.25 m)	5.08 s	1.78 s	2.93 s	4.75 s	7.88 s	29.0 in (0.74 m)	8 ft 7 in (2.62 m)	28 reps
All values from Pro Day

=== Tennessee Titans ===
==== 2015 ====
Spain signed with the Tennessee Titans as an undrafted free agent following the 2015 NFL draft. He made the Titans final roster as a rookie, playing in seven games with six starts at guard. The Titans finished with a league-worst 3–13 record.

==== 2016 ====
Spain won the starting left guard spot and started 13 games, missing three due to injury. The 2016 Titans offensive line was heralded as one of the best in the league, which blocked for DeMarco Murray as he led the American Football Conference (AFC) in rushing yards. The Titans finished with a 9–7 record.

==== 2017 ====
Spain started the 2017 season as the Titans' starting left guard. He started 14 games for the Titans and missed two, who finished with another 9–7 record and qualified for the playoffs. Spain started his first two postseason contests, playing in the Titans' upset comeback 22–21 road victory over the Kansas City Chiefs, blocking for Derrick Henry as he accounted for a then-franchise record 191 total yards, and then the Titans' 35–14 road loss to the New England Patriots in the Divisional Round.

==== 2018 ====
In the 2018 offseason, the Titans placed a tender on Spain, who was a restricted free agent. Spain signed his one-year tender on April 3, 2018. He started 15 games at left guard in 2018, missing the Titans Week 7 London Game against the Los Angeles Chargers as the Titans finished with another 9–7 record. Spain notably blocked for Derrick Henry as he was named AFC Offensive Player of the Month for December.

=== Buffalo Bills ===
==== 2019 ====
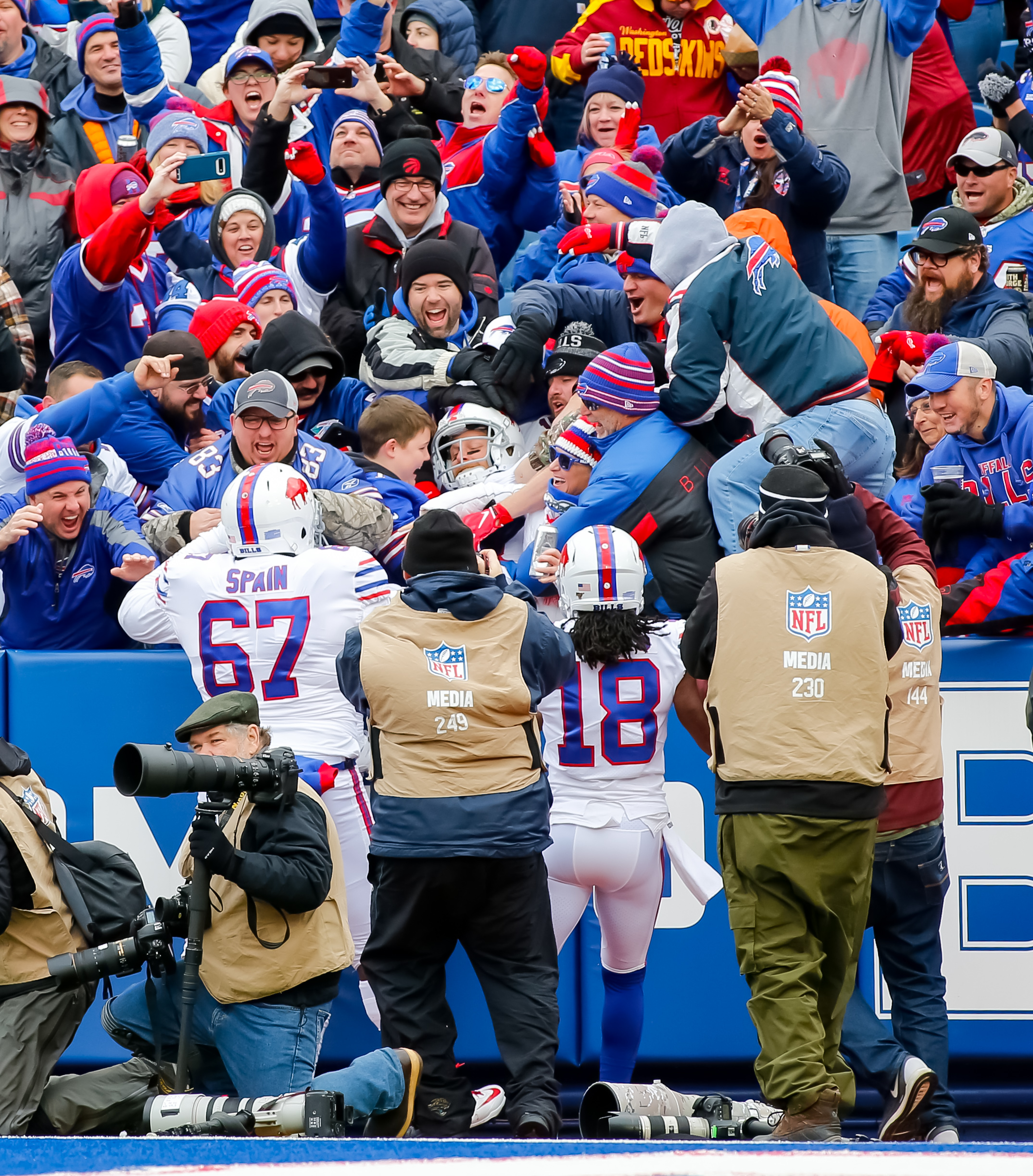
Spain (#67) in 2019

On April 3, 2019, Spain signed a one-year contract with the Buffalo Bills.

During the 2019 season, Spain would start in all 16 games for the Bills, playing every offensive snap, committing only four penalties and not allowing a single sack. The Bills finished with a 10–6 record, qualifying for the playoffs. In the Wild Card Round against the Houston Texans, Spain started at left guard as the Bills lost in overtime by a score of 22–19 despite a 16–0 halftime lead.

==== 2020 ====
On March 17, 2020, Spain signed a three-year, $15 million contract extension with the Bills. He started the first two games at left guard before being benched in favor of Cody Ford and Brian Winters. Spain was released by Buffalo on October 21.

=== Cincinnati Bengals ===
==== 2020 ====
On October 30, 2020, Spain was signed to the practice squad of the Cincinnati Bengals. He was elevated to the active roster on October 31, November 14, and November 21 for the team's Weeks 8, 10, and 11 games against the Tennessee Titans, Pittsburgh Steelers, and Washington Football Team, and reverted to the practice squad after each game. Spain was signed to the active roster on November 23, after starting the previous two games.

==== 2021 ====
Spain re-signed on a one-year contract with the Bengals on March 30, 2021.

Spain was the starting left guard for Cincinnati in Super Bowl LVI, where, on what would prove to be the Bengals' final offensive play of the game, Spain missed the block on Los Angeles Rams defensive tackle Aaron Donald, allowing him to nearly sack quarterback Joe Burrow, forcing a last ditch pass to Samaje Perine which would fall short, resulting in a Bengals 23–20 loss. After the game, Spain received a substantial amount of backlash across social media platforms.

== Personal life ==
Spain has hosted a Football Skills Camp the last three years in his hometown of Petersburg, Virginia. During his camp on July 1, 2017, Petersburg Mayor Sam Parham gave Spain a proclamation and officially declared it Quinton Spain Day.
