= Ty Nsekhe =

American gridiron football player (born 1985)

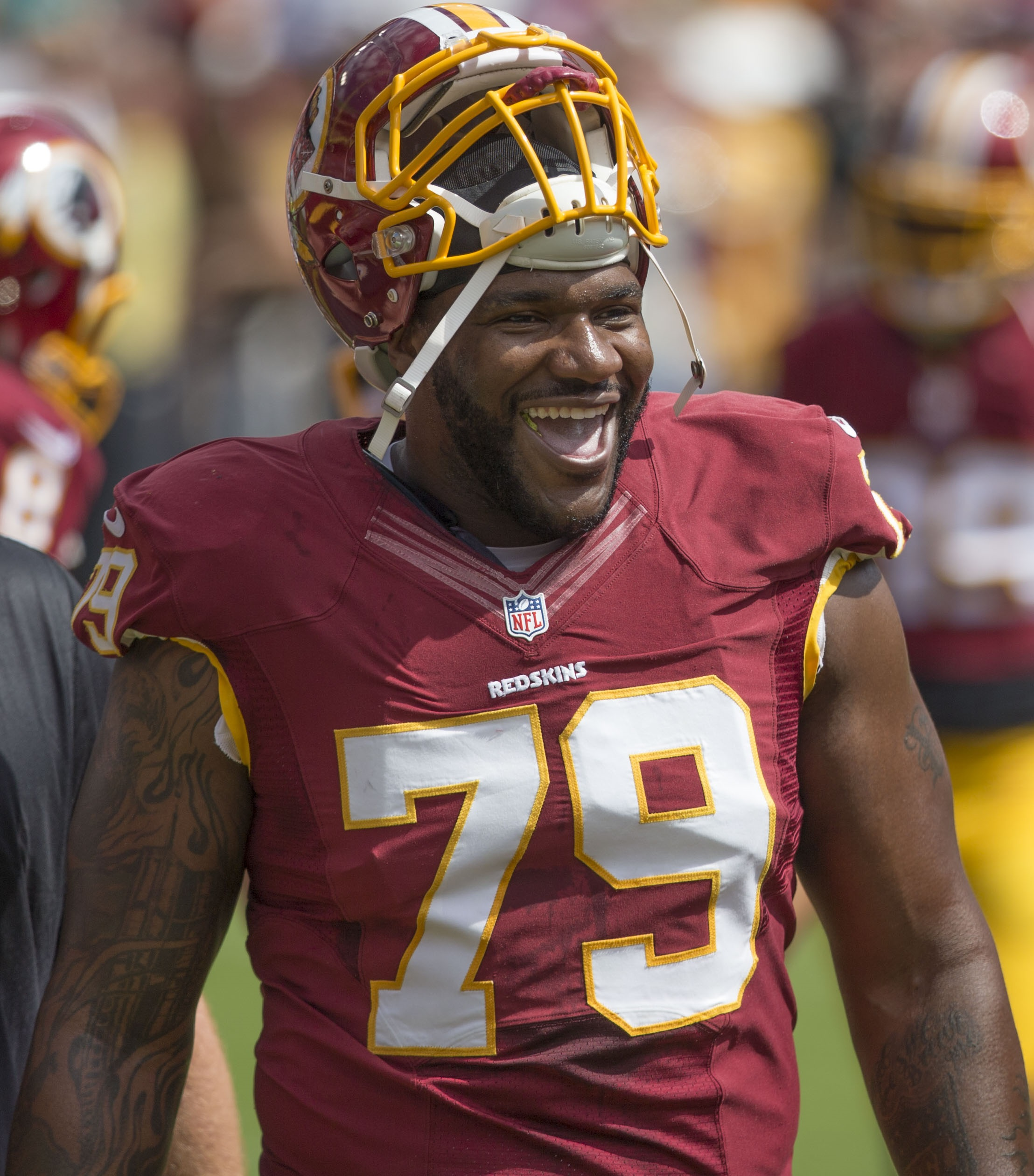
- Nsekhe with the Washington Redskins in 2015

Profile
- Position: Offensive tackle

Personal information
- Born: October 27, 1985 (age 41); Brooklyn, New York, U.S.
- Listed height: 6 ft 8 in (2.03 m)
- Listed weight: 325 lb (147 kg)

Career information
- High school: Bowie (Arlington, Texas)
- College: Texas State
- NFL draft: 2009: undrafted

Career history
- Corpus Christi Sharks (2009); Dallas Vigilantes (2010); Philadelphia Soul (2011); San Antonio Talons (2012); Indianapolis Colts (2012)*; St. Louis Rams (2012); New Orleans Saints (2014); Montreal Alouettes (2014)*; Washington Redskins (2015)*; Los Angeles Kiss (2015)*; Washington Redskins (2015–2018); Buffalo Bills (2019–2020); Dallas Cowboys (2021); Indianapolis Colts (2022)*; Los Angeles Rams (2022); Cleveland Browns (2023); Los Angeles Rams (2024)*
- * Offseason or practice squad member only

Career NFL statistics
- Games played: 105
- Games started: 25
- Stats at Pro Football Reference

Career AFL statistics
- Receptions: 13
- Receiving yards: 123
- Receiving touchdowns: 3
- Tackles: 6
- Stats at ArenaFan.com

Attauyo Nkere "Ty" Nsekhe (born October 27, 1985) is an American professional football offensive tackle. He played college football for the Texas State Bobcats.

== Early life ==
Attauyo Nkere Nsekhe attended Bowie High School, where he played football and basketball. He received first-team All-area honors as a junior and senior.

He accepted a football scholarship from Texas State University. In 2003, he played one season as a true freshman.

In 2004, he was involved in a legal incident when he and other teammates robbed a fraternity house during the spring semester. He was charged with burglary (a second-degree felony) and accepted a plea deal that involved 10 years of probation, 150 hours of community service and the payment of $339.95 in restitution. Additionally, the school dropped him from a full to partial scholarship.

In 2005, Nsekhe chose to enroll at Division II Tarleton State University. He appeared in five games with one start.

In 2006, he transferred to Northwestern Oklahoma State, a National Association of Intercollegiate Athletics college, after Dallas Cowboys wide receiver Patrick Crayton recommended him to make the move. He stayed for one semester and never played in a game, after being expelled from the school.

== Professional career ==
=== Corpus Christi Sharks ===
In 2008, he signed with the Corpus Christi Sharks of the af2, after being out of football for two years. He couldn't complete the season after being arrested and sent to the state prison C. A. Holliday Transfer Facility.

In 2009, he returned to the team, playing as an offensive lineman, defensive lineman and tight end. The league was disbanded in September 2009.

=== Dallas Vigilantes ===
In 2010, he signed with the Dallas Vigilantes of the Arena Football League (AFL). He appeared in one game and made one tackle.

=== Philadelphia Soul ===
On March 1, 2011, he was signed by the Philadelphia Soul of the AFL. He appeared in eight games as a tight end and defensive tackle. He posted 8 receptions for 91 yards, 3 touchdowns and 4 tackles.

=== San Antonio Talons ===
On April 26, 2012, he signed with the San Antonio Talons of the AFL. He appeared in 11 games, making 5 receptions for 32 yards and one tackle.

=== Indianapolis Colts (first stint) ===
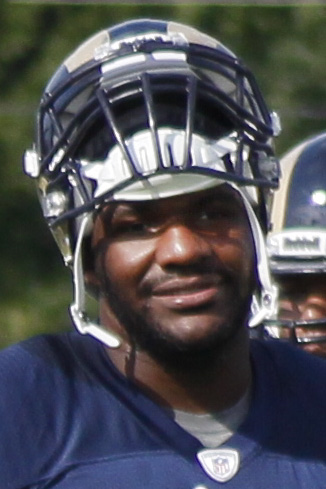
Nsekhe with the Rams in 2013

On August 1, 2012, he with the Indianapolis Colts of the National Football League, after the team released offensive tackle Ben Ijalana. On September 1, 2012, he was released.

=== St. Louis Rams ===
On September 2, 2012, he was claimed off waivers by the St. Louis Rams. He entered the league as a 26-year-old rookie and played in two games. On September 27, 2012, he was released after team claimed Joe Barksdale off waivers. On September 29, 2012, he was signed to the team's practice squad. On August 31, 2013, he was waived injured.

=== New Orleans Saints ===
On January 6, 2014, the New Orleans Saints signed Nsekhe to a reserve/futures contract. The Saints released Nsekhe on August 25, 2014, then placed on the injured reserve list after clearing waivers. On September 9, 2014, the Saints waived Nsekhe from injured reserve list on a no-recall basis.

=== Montreal Alouettes ===
Nsekhe was signed to the Montreal Alouettes' practice roster on October 4, 2014.

=== Washington Redskins (first stint) ===
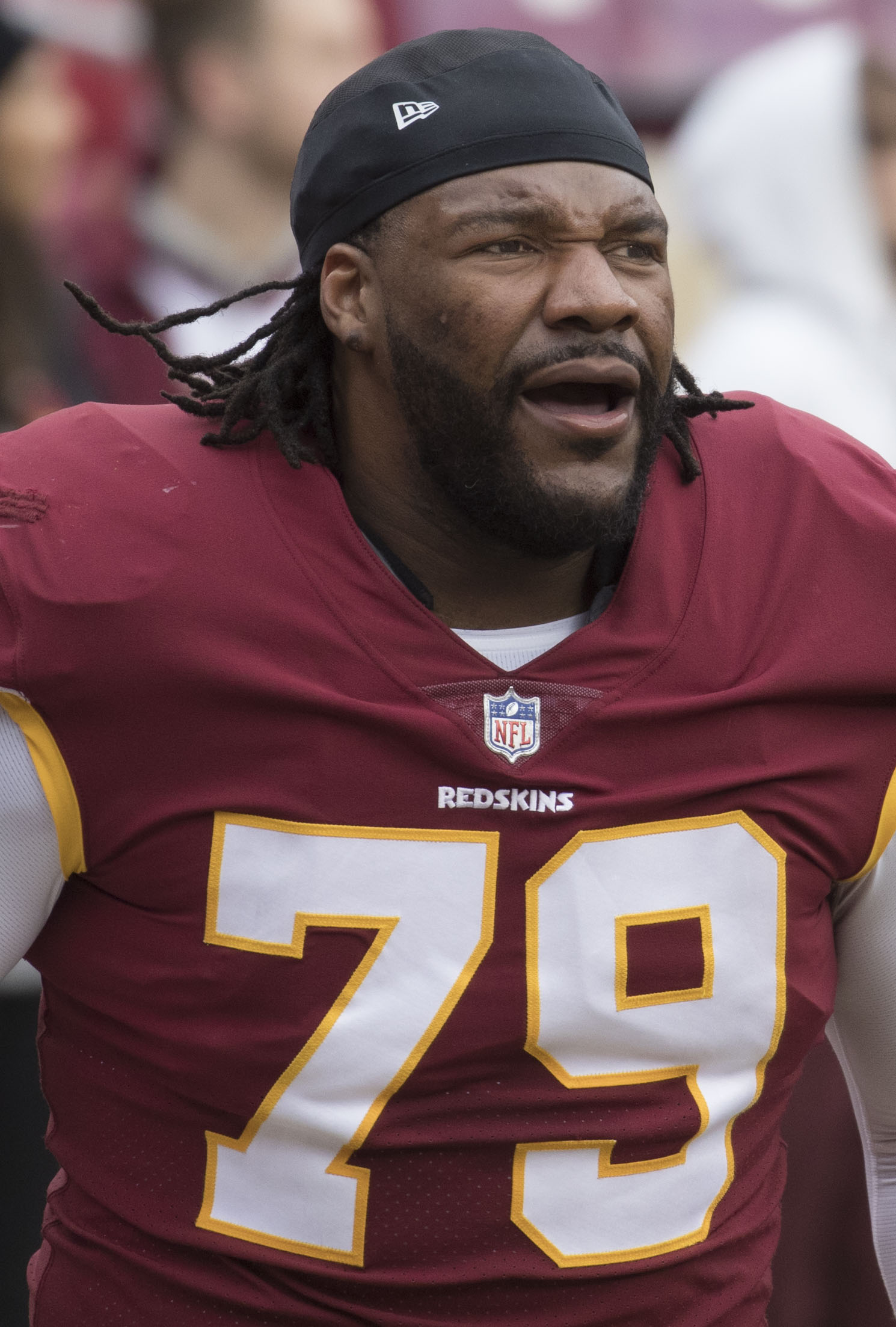
Nsekhe with the Washington Redskins in 2017

On February 10, 2015, Nsekhe signed with the Washington Redskins. He was waived by the Redskins on May 4.

=== Los Angeles Kiss ===
On May 6, 2015, Nsekhe was assigned to the Los Angeles Kiss of the AFL.

=== Washington Redskins (second stint) ===
On May 11, 2015, he was re-signed by the Redskins. He was the backup swing tackle, making two starts at left tackle in place of an injured Trent Williams and also getting some playing time at right tackle.

In 2016, he served as the team's swing tackle. He was forced to start four straight games (three at left tackle and one at right tackle), following the suspension of Pro Bowler Trent Williams for using performance-enhancing drugs.

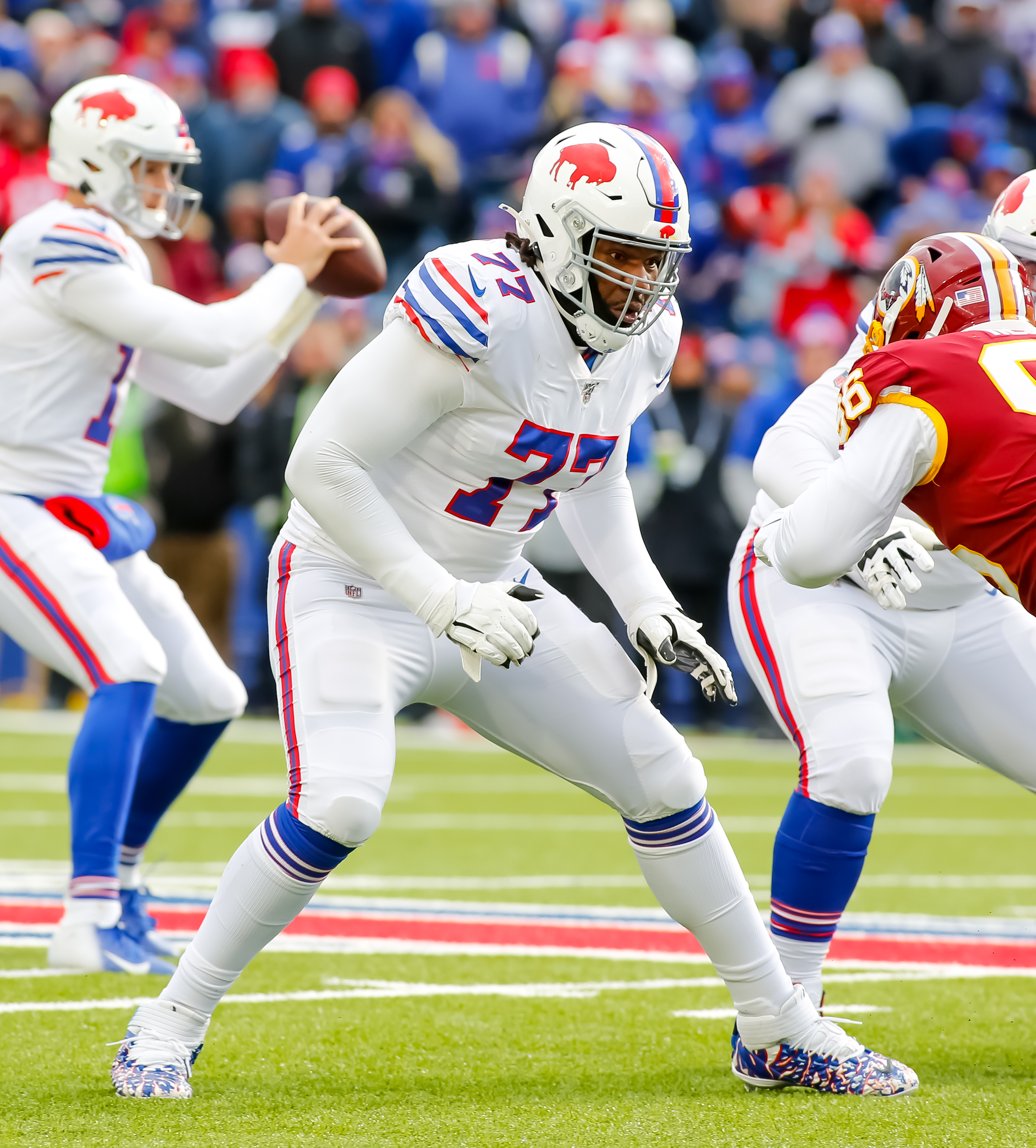
Nsekhe with the Bills in 2019

On February 28, 2017, Nsekhe re-signed with the Redskins. He appeared in 11 games with five starts both at left tackle and right tackle.

On March 12, 2018, the Redskins placed a second-round restricted free agent tender on Nsekhe. He appeared in 14 games with five starts. He had three consecutive starts at left tackle and two at left guard.

=== Buffalo Bills ===
On March 13, 2019, Nsekhe signed a two-year, $14.5 million deal including $7.7 million in guarantees with the Buffalo Bills.

=== Dallas Cowboys ===
On March 22, 2021, Nsekhe signed a one-year contract with the Dallas Cowboys. He was signed to replace veteran Cam Erving as the team's backup swing tackle. He was also used in jumbo packages to play alongside the starting tackles. He appeared in 12 games. He missed the Week 2, Week 3 and Week 4 games, while recovering from heat exhaustion. He wasn't re-signed after the season.

=== Indianapolis Colts (second stint) ===
On October 11, 2022, Nsekhe was signed to the Colts practice squad.

=== Los Angeles Rams (first stint) ===
On October 18, 2022, Nsheke was signed by the Los Angeles Rams off the practice squad of the Colts. He was signed to provide depth after a string of injuries on the offensive line. He started in 10 games last season. He wasn't re-signed after the season.

=== Cleveland Browns ===
On September 12, 2023, Nsekhe was signed to the Cleveland Browns practice squad. He was not signed to a reserve/future contract by the team after the season and thus became a free agent upon the expiration of his practice squad contract.

=== Los Angeles Rams (second stint) ===
On September 10, 2024, Nsekhe was signed to the Los Angeles Rams practice squad and was released one week later.

== Personal life ==
On September 23, 2013, Nsekhe was the subject of a controversy after he responded to a tweet that read, "Hard to believe that a player in a helmet defendin' a football makes more money than a soldier in a helmet defendin' his country." He responded, "It doesn't take much skill to kill someone". Although Nsekhe's tweet was deleted, the story went viral, eventually moving from blogs to the mainstream media. On September 24, the Rams issued a statement rejecting Nsekhe's expressed opinion and emphasizing that he had no connection with the team after having been released on August 31. Nsekhe also issued his own apology via Twitter.
