= 2021 Miami Dolphins season =

56th season in franchise history

- Owner: Stephen M. Ross
- General manager: Chris Grier
- Head coach: Brian Flores
- Home stadium: Hard Rock Stadium

Results
- Record: 9–8
- Division place: 3rd AFC East
- Playoffs: Did not qualify
- Pro Bowlers: CB Xavien Howard

Uniform
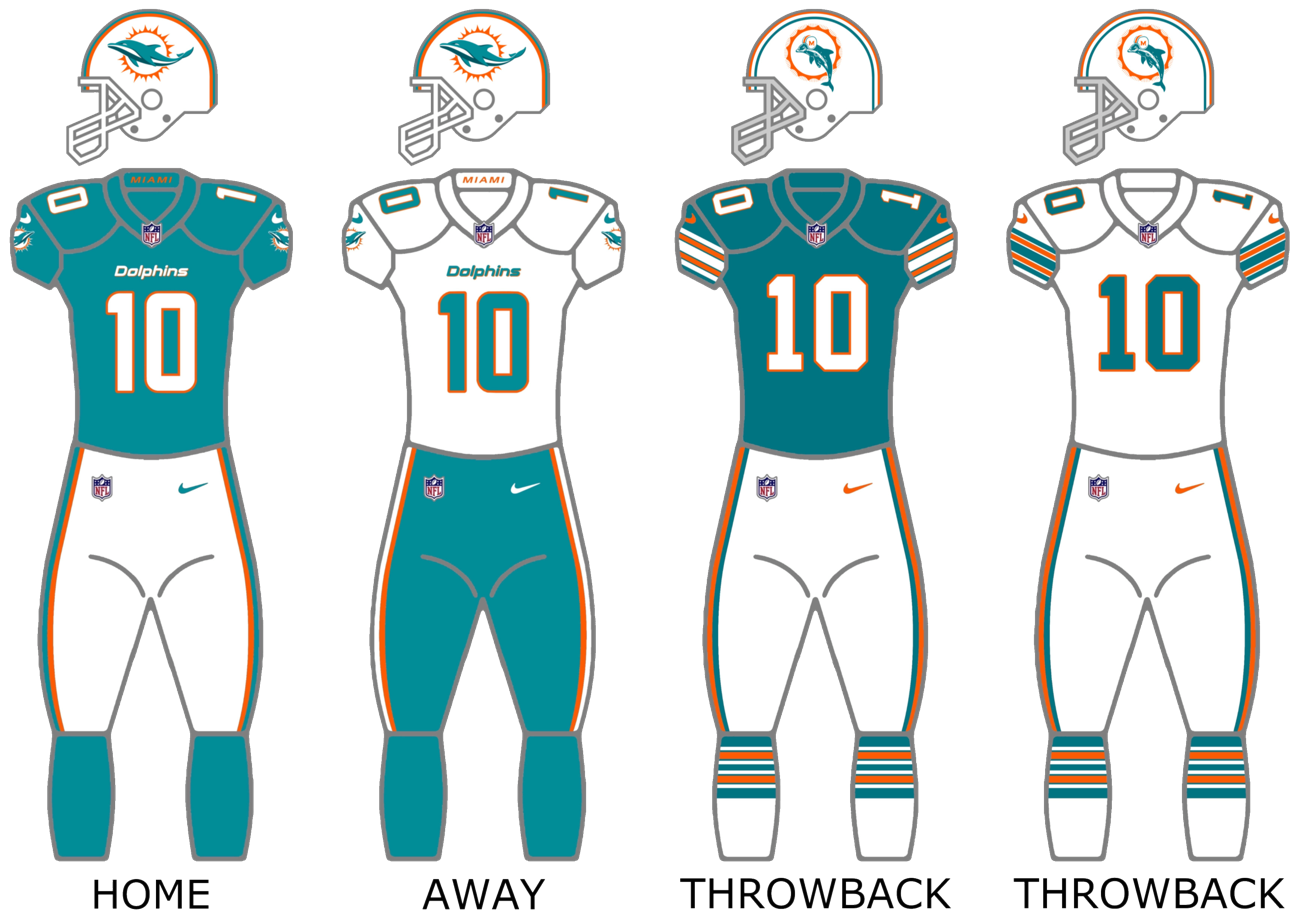

The 2021 season was the Miami Dolphins' 52nd season in the National Football League (NFL), their 56th overall, and their third and final year under head coach Brian Flores, and sixth under general manager Chris Grier. Despite a 1–7 start to the season, Miami then won the next seven games, becoming the first team in NFL history to lose seven straight games and then win seven straight games in the same season. The 7-game win streak was their first since the 1985 season. They also became the sixth team in NFL history to win four or more consecutive games after losing seven in a row, after the 2009 Cleveland Browns, 1994 New York Giants, 1993 New England Patriots, 1984 Green Bay Packers, and the 1978 St. Louis Cardinals. However the Dolphins were eliminated from the playoffs for the fifth consecutive year after their win streak ended in Week 17 to the Tennessee Titans, combined with a win by the Los Angeles Chargers.

Some highlights from the season included head coach Brian Flores becoming the first Dolphins coach since Don Shula to beat the Patriots multiple times in New England, Miami's first wins over the Carolina Panthers and New Orleans Saints since 2009 and 2005 respectively, their first win over the New York Giants since 2003 (which was also Miami's first ever home win over the Giants), and finally their first win in Caesars Superdome since 1986. The Dolphins also swept the New York Jets in back-to-back years for the first time since the 1996 and 1997 seasons, swept the New England Patriots for the first time since 2000, and had consecutive winning seasons for the first time since 2002–2003. However in a surprise move and due to alleged conflicts with both the roster and front office, owner Stephen M. Ross dismissed head coach Brian Flores on January 10, 2022.

== Offseason and training camp ==
On January 5, 2021, Dolphins' offensive coordinator Chan Gailey announced his resignation. On February 2, the Dolphins announced coaches Eric Studesville and George Godsey would share the offensive coordinator position for the upcoming 2021 season.

On May 25, 2021, the NFL announced training camp for all teams will commence on July 27. This will mark the first time the Dolphins have training camp at the new training facility adjacent to Hard Rock Stadium in Miami Gardens, Florida.

On May 26, Tua Tagovailoa, when reflecting on the 2020 season, said he wasn't comfortable calling plays and he didn't know the playbook really well. He added he feels much more comfortable now. On June 15, during the first day of minicamp and during a heavy downpour of rain, Tagovailoa threw five interceptions. He explained later that during minicamp the team had decided to be more aggressive with riskier throws to see what would happen and that they can now learn from the results.

Atlanta Falcons' head coach Arthur Smith announced his team would hold joint practices with the Miami Dolphins sometime around August 21 at Hard Rock Stadium.

On July 27, 2021, All-Pro cornerback Xavien Howard officially requested a trade from the Dolphins over a months-long contract dispute. Despite this, just twelve days later on August 8, 2021, the Dolphins agreed to restructure the cornerback's contract. The deal adds more guaranteed money and incentives, possibly making his payout over $16.285 million.

== Draft ==
2021 Miami Dolphins Draft
Round	Selection	Player	Position	College	Notes
1	6	Jaylen Waddle	WR	Alabama	from Philadelphia
1	18	Jaelan Phillips	OLB	Miami	
2	36	Jevon Holland	FS	Oregon	
2	42	Liam Eichenberg	OT	Notre Dame	from New York
3	81	Hunter Long	TE	Boston College	from San Francisco
7	231	Larnel Coleman	OT	UMass	
7	244	Gerrid Doaks	RB	Cincinnati	from Washington

=== Notable Undrafted Free Agent ===
2021 Miami Dolphins Draft
Round	Selection	Player	Position	College	Notes
—	—	Robert Jones	G	Middle Tennessee	

== Staff ==
2021 Miami Dolphins staff
Front office: Chairman/managing general partner – Stephen Ross; Vice chairman/partner – Bruce Beal; Vice chairman – Jorge Pérez; Vice chairman – Matt Higgins; Vice chairman, president, and CEO – Tom Garfinkel; General manager – Chris Grier; Assistant general manager – Marvin Allen; Vice president, football administration – Brandon Shore; Senior vice president, chief financial officer – Chris Clements; Senior personnel executive – Reggie McKenzie; Co-director, player personnel – Adam Engroff; Co-director, player personnel – Anthony Hunt; Assistant director of college scouting – Matt Winston; Special advisor to the vice chairman, president, and CEO – Dan Marino; Head coaches: Head coach – Brian Flores; Assistant head coach/special teams coordinator – Danny Crossman; Offensive coaches: Quarterbacks – Charlie Frye; Co-offensive coordinator/running backs – Eric Studesville; Wide receivers – Josh Grizzard; Co-offensive coordinator/tight ends – George Godsey; Assistant tight ends – Mike Judge; Offensive line – Lemuel Jeanpierre; Assistant offensive line – Shawn Flaherty	Defensive coaches: Defensive coordinator – Josh Boyer; Defensive line – Austin Clark; Linebackers – Anthony Campanile; Outside linebackers – Rob Leonard; Defensive backs – Gerald Alexander; Cornerbacks – Charles Burks; Assistant defensive backs – Curt Kuntz; Special teams coaches: Assistant special teams – Brendan Farrell; Support staff: Assistant to the head coach – Lance Bennett; Coaching assistant – Steve Ferentz; Coaching assistant – Steven Gregory; Coaching assistant – Kenyon Jackson; Coaching assistant – Tyler Murphy; Coaching assistant – Erick Wren; Quality control – Jordan Salkin; Quality control – Kolby Smith; Strength and conditioning: Head strength and conditioning – Dave Puloka; Assistant strength and conditioning – Jim Arthur; Strength and conditioning assistant – Jimmy Mangiero

== Final roster ==
2021 Miami Dolphins roster
Quarterbacks (QB): 14 Jacoby Brissett; 1 Tua Tagovailoa; Running backs (RB): 26 Salvon Ahmed; 37 Myles Gaskin; 28 Duke Johnson; 31 Phillip Lindsay; Wide receivers (WR): 87 Isaiah Ford; 86 Mack Hollins; 11 DeVante Parker; 17 Jaylen Waddle; 18 Preston Williams; 2 Albert Wilson; Tight ends (TE): 82 Cethan Carter; 88 Mike Gesicki; 84 Hunter Long; 80 Adam Shaheen; 81 Durham Smythe	Offensive linemen (OL): 77 Jesse Davis T; 63 Michael Deiter C; 74 Liam Eichenberg T; 68 Robert Hunt G; 73 Austin Jackson G; 65 Robert Jones T; 66 Solomon Kindley G; 62 Greg Mancz C; Defensive linemen (DL): 70 Adam Butler DE; 98 Raekwon Davis NT; 90 John Jenkins NT; 91 Emmanuel Ogbah DE; 92 Zach Sieler DE; 94 Christian Wilkins DE	Linebackers (LB): 55 Jerome Baker ILB; 47 Vince Biegel OLB; 49 Samuel Eguavoen ILB; 41 Darius Hodge OLB; 50 Calvin Munson ILB; 15 Jaelan Phillips OLB; 45 Duke Riley ILB; 52 Elandon Roberts ILB; 57 Brennan Scarlett OLB; 43 Andrew Van Ginkel OLB; Defensive backs (DB): 27 Justin Coleman CB; 42 Clayton Fejedelem SS; 8 Jevon Holland FS; 25 Xavien Howard CB; 9 Noah Igbinoghene CB; 29 Brandon Jones SS; 24 Byron Jones CB; 40 Nik Needham CB; 20 Sheldrick Redwine FS; 21 Eric Rowe SS; 6 Trill Williams CB; Special teams (ST): 44 Blake Ferguson LS; 5 Michael Palardy P; 7 Jason Sanders K	Practice squad: 10 Damon Arnette CB; 93 Andrew Billings NT; 19 Cody Core WR; 38 Javaris Davis CB; 23 Gerrid Doaks RB; 72 Roderick Johnson T; 95 Benito Jones NT; 85 Tommylee Lewis WR (PS/I); 16 Jake Luton QB; 48 Wynton McManis ILB; 83 Kirk Merritt WR; 35 Chris Milton CB; 78 Adam Pankey T; 60 Spencer Pulley C; 69 Durval Queiroz Neto G (IPP); 22 Jordan Scarlett RB (PS/I); 76 Kion Smith T; 64 Cameron Tom C; 89 David Yurkovich TE; Reserve: -- Lynn Bowden WR (IR); 34 Malcolm Brown RB (IR); 22 Elijah Campbell CB (IR); 79 Larnel Coleman T (IR); 3 Will Fuller WR (IR); -- Allen Hurns WR (IR); 32 Patrick Laird RB (IR); 75 Greg Little T (IR); 30 Jason McCourty FS (IR); 33 Jamal Perry CB (IR); Rookies in italics 52 active, 12 reserve, 15 practice squad (4 exempt)

== Preseason ==
Week	Date	Opponent	Result	Record	Venue	Recap
1	August 14	at Chicago Bears	L 13–20	0–1	Soldier Field	Recap
2	August 21	Atlanta Falcons	W 37–17	1–1	Hard Rock Stadium	Recap
3	August 29	at Cincinnati Bengals	W 29–26	2–1	Paul Brown Stadium	Recap

== Regular season ==
=== Schedule ===
The Dolphins' 2021 schedule was announced on May 12.

Week	Date	Opponent	Result	Record	Venue	Recap
1	September 12	at **New England Patriots**	**W** 17–16	1–0	Gillette Stadium	Recap
2	September 19	**Buffalo Bills**	**L** 0–35	1–1	Hard Rock Stadium	Recap
3	September 26	at Las Vegas Raiders	**L** 28–31 (OT)	1–2	Allegiant Stadium	Recap
4	October 3	Indianapolis Colts	**L** 17–27	1–3	Hard Rock Stadium	Recap
5	October 10	at Tampa Bay Buccaneers	**L** 17–45	1–4	Raymond James Stadium	Recap
6	October 17	at Jacksonville Jaguars	**L** 20–23	1–5	(United Kingdom) Tottenham Hotspur Stadium (London)	Recap
7	October 24	Atlanta Falcons	**L** 28–30	1–6	Hard Rock Stadium	Recap
8	October 31	at **Buffalo Bills**	**L** 11–26	1–7	Highmark Stadium	Recap
9	November 7	Houston Texans	**W** 17–9	2–7	Hard Rock Stadium	Recap
10	November 11	Baltimore Ravens	**W** 22–10	3–7	Hard Rock Stadium	Recap
11	November 21	at **New York Jets**	**W** 24–17	4–7	MetLife Stadium	Recap
12	November 28	Carolina Panthers	**W** 33–10	5–7	Hard Rock Stadium	Recap
13	December 5	New York Giants	**W** 20–9	6–7	Hard Rock Stadium	Recap
14	Bye					
15	December 19	**New York Jets**	**W** 31–24	7–7	Hard Rock Stadium	Recap
16	December 27	at New Orleans Saints	**W** 20–3	8–7	Caesars Superdome	Recap
17	January 2	at Tennessee Titans	**L** 3–34	8–8	Nissan Stadium	Recap
18	January 9	**New England Patriots**	**W** 33–24	9–8	Hard Rock Stadium	Recap

Note: Intra-division opponents are in bold text.

=== Game summaries ===
==== Week 1: at New England Patriots ====
Week 1: Miami Dolphins at New England Patriots – Game summary

Quarter	1	2	3	4	Total
**Dolphins**	7	3	7	0	**17**
Patriots	0	10	3	3	**16**

at Gillette Stadium, Foxborough, Massachusetts

- Date: September 12
- Game time: 4:25 p.m. EDT
- Game weather: Partly cloudy, 82 °F (28 °C)
- Game attendance: 65,878
- Referee: Clete Blakeman
- TV announcers (CBS): Kevin Harlan, Trent Green and Melanie Collins
- Recap, Game Book

Game information

**First quarter**

- MIA – Tua Tagovailoa 3-yard run (Jason Sanders kick), 5:29. Dolphins 7–0. **Drive: 10 plays, 80 yards, 5:05.**

**Second quarter**

- NE – Nick Folk 27-yard field goal, 10:17. Dolphins 7–3. **Drive: 14 plays, 65 yards, 6:56.**
- NE – Nelson Agholor 7-yard pass from Mac Jones (Nick Folk kick), 2:35. Patriots 10–7. **Drive: 7 plays, 63 yards, 3:36.**
- MIA – Jason Sanders 48-yard field goal, 0:00. Tied 10–10. **Drive: 8 plays, 45 yards, 2:30.**

**Third quarter**

- MIA – Jaylen Waddle 3-yard pass from Tua Tagovailoa (Jason Sanders kick), 10:51. Dolphins 17–10. **Drive: 9 plays, 75 yards, 4:09.**
- NE – Nick Folk 42-yard field goal, 2:50. Dolphins 17–13. **Drive: 14 plays, 67 yards, 8:01.**

**Fourth quarter**

- NE – Nick Folk 33-yard field goal, 10:36. Dolphins 17–16. **Drive: 14 plays, 57 yards, 5:37.**

**Top passers**

- MIA – Tua Tagovailoa – 16/27, 202 yards, TD, INT
- NE – Mac Jones – 29/39, 281 yards, TD

**Top rushers**

- MIA – Myles Gaskin – 9 rushes, 49 yards
- NE – Damien Harris – 23 rushes, 100 yards

**Top receivers**

- MIA – DeVante Parker – 4 receptions, 81 yards
- NE – Nelson Agholor – 5 receptions, 72 yards, TD

The Dolphins take sole possession of first place in the AFC East with this win as they improved to 1–0, their first such start since 2018. It was also the first time since 2017 that the Patriots had lost a season opener. Head coach Brian Flores also became the first Dolphins head coach since Don Shula to beat New England multiple times in Foxboro. The win was secured when Damien Harris fumbled the ball with 3:35 left in the fourth quarter and Miami ran out the clock.

==== Week 2: vs. Buffalo Bills ====
Week 2: Buffalo Bills at Miami Dolphins – Game summary

Quarter	1	2	3	4	Total
**Bills**	14	0	7	14	**35**
Dolphins	0	0	0	0	**0**

at Hard Rock Stadium, Miami Gardens, Florida

- Date: September 19
- Game time: 1:00 p.m. EDT
- Game weather: Mostly cloudy, 88 °F (31 °C)
- Game attendance: 65,040
- Referee: Craig Wrolstad
- TV announcers (Fox): Brandon Gaudin, Matt Millen and Sarah Kustok
- Recap, Game Book

Game information

**First quarter**

- BUF – Devin Singletary 46-yard run (Tyler Bass kick), 12:33. Bills 7–0. **Drive: 2 plays, 46 yards, 0:12.**
- BUF – Stefon Diggs 5-yard pass from Josh Allen (Tyler Bass kick), 7:02. Bills 14–0. **Drive: 7 plays, 52 yards, 3:39.**

**Second quarter**

- No scoring plays

**Third quarter**

- BUF – Dawson Knox 8-yard pass from Josh Allen (Tyler Bass kick), 11:48. Bills 21–0. **Drive: 8 plays, 75 yards, 3:12.**

**Fourth quarter**

- BUF – Zack Moss 7-yard run (Tyler Bass kick), 13:38. Bills 28–0. **Drive: 11 plays, 41 yards, 5:21.**
- BUF – Zack Moss 1-yard run (Tyler Bass kick), 7:45. Bills 35–0. **Drive: 8 plays, 62 yards, 4:13.**

**Top passers**

- BUF – Josh Allen – 17/33, 179 yards, 2 TD, INT
- MIA – Jacoby Brissett – 24/40, 169 yards, INT

**Top rushers**

- BUF – Devin Singletary – 13 rushes, 82 yards, TD
- MIA – Myles Gaskin – 5 rushes, 25 yards

**Top receivers**

- BUF – Stefon Diggs – 4 receptions, 60 yards, TD
- MIA – Jaylen Waddle – 6 receptions, 48 yards

Despite forcing two turnovers to extend their streak of games with takeaways to 24, the Dolphins suffered their worst loss to the Bills with a 35–0 shutout by Buffalo. Quarterback Tua Tagovailoa suffered a rib injury in the first quarter, forcing backup Jacoby Brissett to finish the game in his stead.

==== Week 3: at Las Vegas Raiders ====
Week 3: Miami Dolphins at Las Vegas Raiders – Game summary

Quarter	1	2	3	4	OT	Total
Dolphins	14	0	0	11	3	**28**
**Raiders**	2	10	7	6	6	**31**

at Allegiant Stadium, Paradise, Nevada

- Date: September 26
- Game time: 4:05 p.m. EDT/1:05 p.m. PDT
- Game weather: None (indoor stadium)
- Game attendance: 59,311
- Referee: Carl Cheffers
- TV announcers (CBS): Ian Eagle, Charles Davis and Evan Washburn
- Recap, Game Book

Game information

**First quarter**

- MIA – Elandon Roberts 85-yard interception return (Jason Sanders kick), 6:34. Dolphins 7–0.
- MIA – Malcolm Brown 24-yard run (Jason Sanders kick), 3:07. Dolphins 14–0. **Drive: 4 plays, 34 yards, 1:42.**
- LV – Casey Hayward tackled Jaylen Waddle in end zone for safety, 0:32. Dolphins 14–2.

**Second quarter**

- LV – Daniel Carlson 50-yard field goal, 11:36. Dolphins 14–5. **Drive: 9 plays, 31 yards, 3:56.**
- LV – Alec Ingold 1-yard pass from Derek Carr (Daniel Carlson kick), 1:56. Dolphins 14–12. **Drive: 10 plays, 95 yards, 4:24.**

**Third quarter**

- LV – Hunter Renfrow 12-yard pass from Derek Carr (Daniel Carlson kick), 7:17. Raiders 19–14. **Drive: 9 plays, 72 yards, 5:16.**

**Fourth quarter**

- LV – Peyton Barber 1-yard run (kick failed), 13:47. Raiders 25–14. **Drive: 11 plays, 84 yards, 6:05.**
- MIA – Jason Sanders 46-yard field goal, 8:30. Raiders 25–17. **Drive: 11 plays, 47 yards, 5:17.**
- MIA – Jacoby Brissett 1-yard run (Jacoby Brissett–Will Fuller pass), 0:02. Tied 25–25. **Drive: 13 plays, 82 yards, 3:20.**

**Overtime**

- LV – Daniel Carlson 38-yard field goal, 6:27. Raiders 28–25. **Drive: 8 plays, 55 yards, 3:33.**
- MIA – Jason Sanders 50-yard field goal, 2:49. Tied 28–28. **Drive: 11 plays, 48 yards, 3:38.**
- LV – Daniel Carlson 22-yard field goal, 0:00. Raiders 31–28. **Drive: 8 plays, 72 yards, 2:49.**

**Top passers**

- MIA – Jacoby Brissett – 32/49, 215 yards
- LV– Derek Carr – 26/43, 386 yards, 2 TD, INT

**Top rushers**

- MIA – Myles Gaskin – 13 rushes, 65 yards
- LV – Peyton Barber – 23 rushes, 111 yards, TD

**Top receivers**

- MIA – Mike Gesicki – 10 receptions, 86 yards
- LV – Bryan Edwards – 3 receptions, 89 yards

==== Week 4: vs. Indianapolis Colts ====
Week 4: Indianapolis Colts at Miami Dolphins – Game summary

Quarter	1	2	3	4	Total
**Colts**	0	7	10	10	**27**
Dolphins	3	0	0	14	**17**

at Hard Rock Stadium, Miami Gardens, Florida

- Date: October 3
- Game time: 1:00 p.m. EDT
- Game weather: Partly cloudy, 85 °F (29 °C)
- Game attendance: 64,571
- Referee: Alex Kemp
- TV announcers (CBS): Spero Dedes and Jay Feely
- Recap, Game Book

Game information

**First quarter**

- MIA – Jason Sanders 38-yard field goal, 9:54. Dolphins 3–0. **Drive: 4 plays, 7 yards, 1:18.**

**Second quarter**

- IND – Jonathan Taylor 23-yard run (Rodrigo Blankenship kick), 2:47. Colts 7–3. **Drive: 10 plays, 80 yards, 5:14.**

**Third quarter**

- IND – Mo Alie-Cox 3-yard pass from Carson Wentz (Rodrigo Blankenship kick), 8:29. Colts 14–3. **Drive: 11 plays, 84 yards, 6:31.**
- IND – Rodrigo Blankenship 34-yard field goal, 0:54. Colts 17–3. **Drive: 4 plays, 2 yards, 2:56.**

**Fourth quarter**

- IND – Rodrigo Blankenship 43-yard field goal, 13:17. Colts 20–3. **Drive: 4 plays, 5 yards, 1:30.**
- MIA – Mike Gesicki 1-yard pass from Jacoby Brissett (Jason Sanders kick), 10:40. Colts 20–10. **Drive: 8 plays, 75 yards, 2:37.**
- IND – Mo Alie-Cox 11-yard pass from Carson Wentz (Rodrigo Blankenship kick), 6:15. Colts 27–10. **Drive: 8 plays, 60 yards, 4:25.**
- MIA – DeVante Parker 3-yard pass from Jacoby Brissett (Jason Sanders kick), 4:24. Colts 27–17. **Drive: 6 plays, 75 yards, 1:51.**

**Top passers**

- IND – Carson Wentz – 24/32, 228 yards, 2 TD
- MIA – Jacoby Brissett – 20/30, 199 yards, 2 TD

**Top rushers**

- IND – Jonathan Taylor – 16 rushes, 103 yards, TD
- MIA – Malcolm Brown – 8 rushes, 23 yards

**Top receivers**

- IND – Michael Pittman Jr. – 6 receptions, 95 yards
- MIA – DeVante Parker – 4 receptions, 77 yards, TD

==== Week 5: at Tampa Bay Buccaneers ====
Week 5: Miami Dolphins at Tampa Bay Buccaneers – Game summary

Quarter	1	2	3	4	Total
Dolphins	10	0	7	0	**17**
**Buccaneers**	7	17	0	21	**45**

at Raymond James Stadium, Tampa, Florida

- Date: October 10
- Game time: 1:00 p.m. EDT
- Game weather: Cloudy, 84 °F (29 °C)
- Game attendance: 65,570
- Referee: Jerome Boger
- TV announcers (CBS): Jim Nantz, Tony Romo and Tracy Wolfson
- Recap, Game Book

Game information

**First quarter**

- MIA – Jason Sanders 23-yard field goal, 11:17. Dolphins 3–0. **Drive: 8 plays, 70 yards, 3:43.**
- TB – Giovani Bernard 10-yard pass from Tom Brady (Ryan Succop kick), 7:04. Buccaneers 7–3. **Drive: 8 plays, 80 yards, 4:13.**
- MIA – Myles Gaskin 24-yard pass from Jacoby Brissett (Jason Sanders kick), 3:16. Dolphins 10–7. **Drive: 8 plays, 75 yards, 3:48.**

**Second quarter**

- TB – Ryan Succop 42-yard field goal, 14:06. Tied 10–10. **Drive: 10 plays, 51 yards, 4:10.**
- TB – Antonio Brown 62-yard pass from Tom Brady (Ryan Succop kick), 11:01. Buccaneers 17–10. **Drive: 3 plays, 70 yards, 1:34.**
- TB – Antonio Brown 4-yard pass from Tom Brady (Ryan Succop kick), 1:48. Buccaneers 24–10. **Drive: 13 plays, 77 yards, 6:19.**

**Third quarter**

- MIA – Myles Gaskin 1-yard pass from Jacoby Brissett (Jason Sanders kick), 6:56. Buccaneers 24–17. **Drive: 11 plays, 87 yards, 5:52.**

**Fourth quarter**

- TB – Leonard Fournette 5-yard run (Ryan Succop kick), 14:57. Buccaneers 31–17. **Drive: 13 plays, 75 yards, 6:59.**
- TB – Mike Evans 34-yard pass from Tom Brady (Ryan Succop kick), 11:49. Buccaneers 38–17. **Drive: 4 plays, 61 yards, 2:10.**
- TB – Mike Evans 22-yard pass from Tom Brady (Ryan Succop kick), 8:57. Buccaneers 45–17. **Drive: 3 plays, 41 yards, 1:50.**

**Top passers**

- MIA – Jacoby Brissett – 27/39, 275 yards, 2 TD, INT
- TB – Tom Brady – 30/41, 411 yards, 5 TD

**Top rushers**

- MIA – Myles Gaskin – 5 rushes, 25 yards
- TB – Leonard Fournette – 12 rushes, 67 yards, TD

**Top receivers**

- MIA – Myles Gaskin – 7 receptions, 74 yards, 2 TD
- TB – Antonio Brown – 7 receptions, 124 yards, 2 TD

==== Week 6: at Jacksonville Jaguars ====
NFL London games

Week 6: Miami Dolphins at Jacksonville Jaguars – Game summary

Quarter	1	2	3	4	Total
Dolphins	7	6	0	7	**20**
**Jaguars**	3	7	7	6	**23**

at Tottenham Hotspur Stadium, London, England

- Date: October 17
- Game time: 1:30 p.m. BST/9:30 a.m. EDT
- Game weather: Partly cloudy, 61 °F (16 °C)
- Game attendance: 60,784
- Referee: John Hussey
- TV announcers (CBS): Kevin Harlan, Trent Green and Melanie Collins
- Recap, Game Book

Game information

**First quarter**

- MIA – Jaylen Waddle 6-yard pass from Tua Tagovailoa (Jason Sanders kick), 7:45. Dolphins 7–0. **Drive: 13 plays, 75 yards, 7:15.**
- JAX – Matthew Wright 40-yard field goal, 3:49. Dolphins 7–3. **Drive: 8 plays, 56 yards, 3:56.**

**Second quarter**

- MIA– Jason Sanders 33-yard field goal, 14:15. Dolphins 10–3. **Drive: 9 plays, 66 yards, 4:34.**
- MIA– Jason Sanders 24-yard field goal, 5:38. Dolphins 13–3. **Drive: 8 plays, 32 yards, 3:11.**
- JAX – Marvin Jones 28-yard pass from Trevor Lawrence (Matthew Wright kick), 0:40. Dolphins 13–10. **Drive: 6 plays, 49 yards, 1:05.**

**Third quarter**

- JAX – James Robinson 1-yard run (Matthew Wright kick), 12:29. Jaguars 17–13. **Drive: 5 plays, 75 yards, 2:31.**

**Fourth quarter**

- MIA – Jaylen Waddle 2-yard pass from Tua Tagovailoa (Jason Sanders kick), 10:22. Dolphins 20–17. **Drive: 7 plays, 91 yards, 3:53.**
- JAX – Matthew Wright 54-yard field goal, 3:40. Tied 20–20. **Drive: 9 plays, 44 yards, 2:59.**
- JAX – Matthew Wright 53-yard field goal, 0:00. Jaguars 23–20. **Drive: 5 plays, 11 yards, 1:42.**

**Top passers**

- MIA – Tua Tagovailoa – 33/47, 329 yards, 2 TD, INT
- JAX – Trevor Lawrence – 25/41, 319 yards, TD

**Top rushers**

- MIA – Malcolm Brown – 5 rushes, 24 yards
- JAX – James Robinson – 17 rushes, 73 yards, TD

**Top receivers**

- MIA – Mike Gesicki – 8 receptions, 115 yards
- JAX – Marvin Jones – 7 receptions, 100 yards, TD

==== Week 7: vs. Atlanta Falcons ====
Week 7: Atlanta Falcons at Miami Dolphins – Game summary

Quarter	1	2	3	4	Total
**Falcons**	0	13	7	10	**30**
Dolphins	7	0	7	14	**28**

at Hard Rock Stadium, Miami Gardens, Florida

- Date: October 24
- Game time: 1:00 p.m. EDT
- Game weather: Partly cloudy, 86 °F (30 °C)
- Game attendance: 62,739
- Referee: Scott Novak
- TV announcers (Fox): Chris Myers, Daryl Johnston and Jen Hale
- Recap, Game Book

Game information

**First quarter**

- MIA – Isaiah Ford 10-yard pass from Tua Tagovailoa (Jason Sanders kick), 7:53. Dolphins 7–0. **Drive: 14 plays, 75 yards, 7:07.**

**Second quarter**

- ATL – Younghoe Koo 33-yard field goal, 14:13. Dolphins 7–3. **Drive: 11 plays, 68 yards, 5:25.**
- ATL – Calvin Ridley 5-yard pass from Matt Ryan (Younghoe Koo kick), 4:47. Falcons 10–7. **Drive: 10 plays, 61 yards, 5:09.**
- ATL – Younghoe Koo 36-yard field goal, 0:04. Falcons 13–7. **Drive: 6 plays, 62 yards, 0:32.**

**Third quarter**

- ATL – Russell Gage 49-yard pass from Matt Ryan (Younghoe Koo kick), 13:53. Falcons 20–7. **Drive: 3 plays, 77 yards, 1:07.**
- MIA – Mike Gesicki 6-yard pass from Tua Tagovailoa (Jason Sanders kick), 5:15. Falcons 20–14. **Drive: 9 plays, 58 yards, 3:48.**

**Fourth quarter**

- ATL – Cordarrelle Patterson 3-yard run (Younghoe Koo kick), 12:51. Falcons 27–14. **Drive: 3 plays, 14 yards, 1:06.**
- MIA – Myles Gaskin 7-yard pass from Tua Tagovailoa (Jason Sanders kick), 8:29. Falcons 27–21. **Drive: 9 plays, 90 yards, 4:22.**
- MIA – Mack Hollins 4-yard pass from Tua Tagovailoa (Jason Sanders kick), 2:27. Dolphins 28–27. **Drive: 9 plays, 40 yards, 3:27.**
- ATL – Younghoe Koo 36-yard field goal, 0:00. Falcons 30–28. **Drive: 9 plays, 57 yards, 2:27.**

**Top passers**

- ATL – Matt Ryan – 25/40, 336 yards, 2 TD, INT
- MIA – Tua Tagovailoa – 32/40, 291 yards, 4 TD, 2 INT

**Top rushers**

- ATL – Cordarrelle Patterson – 14 rushes, 60 yards, TD
- MIA – Myles Gaskin – 15 rushes, 67 yards

**Top receivers**

- ATL – Kyle Pitts – 7 receptions, 163 yards
- MIA – Mike Gesicki – 7 receptions, 85 yards, TD

The Dolphins trailed 27–14 at the start of the 4th quarter and 2 touchdowns were not enough to secure the win.

==== Week 8: at Buffalo Bills ====
Week 8: Miami Dolphins at Buffalo Bills – Game summary

Quarter	1	2	3	4	Total
Dolphins	0	3	0	8	**11**
**Bills**	3	0	7	16	**26**

at Highmark Stadium, Orchard Park, New York

- Date: October 31
- Game time: 1:00 p.m. EDT
- Game weather: Cloudy, 51 °F (11 °C)
- Game attendance: 69,355
- Referee: Shawn Smith
- TV announcers (CBS): Andrew Catalon, James Lofton and Amanda Balionis
- Recap, Game Book

Game information

**First quarter**

- BUF – Tyler Bass 57-yard field goal, 3:48. Bills 3–0. **Drive: 7 plays, 35 yards, 4:18.**

**Second quarter**

- MIA – Jason Sanders 51-yard field goal, 8:10. Tied 3–3. **Drive: 7 plays, 32 yards, 3:51.**

**Third quarter**

- BUF – Gabe Davis 8-yard pass from Josh Allen (Tyler Bass kick), 3:49. Bills 10–3. **Drive: 13 plays, 80 yards, 7:06.**

**Fourth quarter**

- BUF – Stefon Diggs 19-yard pass from Josh Allen (Tyler Bass kick), 13:23. Bills 17–3. **Drive: 9 plays, 69 yards, 3:49.**
- MIA – Tua Tagovailoa 1-yard run (Tua Tagovailoa–Mike Gesicki pass), 9:39. Bills 17–11. **Drive: 11 plays, 75 yards, 3:44.**
- BUF – Tyler Bass 39-yard field goal, 3:33. Bills 20–11. **Drive: 14 plays, 59 yards, 6:10.**
- BUF – Josh Allen 7-yard run (run failed), 1:07. Bills 26–11. **Drive: 3 plays, 11 yards, 1:14.**

**Top passers**

- MIA – Tua Tagovailoa – 21/39, 205 yards, INT
- BUF – Josh Allen – 29/42, 249 yards, 2 TD

**Top rushers**

- MIA – Myles Gaskin – 12 rushes, 36 yards
- BUF – Josh Allen – 8 rushes, 55 yards, TD

**Top receivers**

- MIA – DeVante Parker – 8 receptions, 85 yards
- BUF – Cole Beasley – 10 receptions, 110 yards

==== Week 9: vs. Houston Texans ====
Week 9: Houston Texans at Miami Dolphins – Game summary

Quarter	1	2	3	4	Total
Texans	0	6	0	3	**9**
**Dolphins**	7	10	0	0	**17**

at Hard Rock Stadium, Miami Gardens, Florida

- Date: November 7
- Game time: 1:00 p.m. EST
- Game weather: 72 °F (22 °C)
- Game attendance: 60,232
- Referee: Adrian Hill
- TV announcers (Fox): Chris Myers, Daryl Johnston and Jen Hale
- Recap, Game Book

Game information

**First quarter**

- MIA – Myles Gaskin 6-yard run (Jason Sanders kick), 4:37. Dolphins 7–0. **Drive: 12 plays, 80 yards, 6:03.**

**Second quarter**

- HOU – Kaʻimi Fairbairn 31-yard field goal, 9:48. Dolphins 7–3. **Drive: 7 plays, 20 yards, 3:21.**
- HOU – Kaʻimi Fairbairn 40-yard field goal, 4:32. Dolphins 7–6. **Drive: 4 plays, 1 yard, 0:58.**
- MIA – Jason Sanders 42-yard field goal, 1:08. Dolphins 10–6. **Drive: 10 plays, 51 yards, 3:24.**
- MIA – Mack Hollins 5-yard pass from Jacoby Brissett (Jason Sanders kick), 0:29. Dolphins 17–6. **Drive: 4 plays, 26 yards, 0:24.**

**Third quarter**

- No scoring plays.

**Fourth quarter**

- HOU – Kaʻimi Fairbairn 20-yard field goal, 11:32. Dolphins 17–9. **Drive: 14 plays, 92 yards, 5:40.**

**Top passers**

- HOU – Tyrod Taylor – 23/42, 231 yards, 3 INT
- MIA – Jacoby Brissett – 26/43, 244 yards, TD, 2 INT

**Top rushers**

- HOU – Phillip Lindsay – 8 rushes, 28 yards
- MIA – Myles Gaskin – 20 rushes, 34 yards, TD

**Top receivers**

- HOU – Danny Amendola – 3 receptions, 49 yards
- MIA – Jaylen Waddle – 8 receptions, 83 yards

==== Week 10: vs. Baltimore Ravens ====
Week 10: Baltimore Ravens at Miami Dolphins – Game summary

Quarter	1	2	3	4	Total
Ravens	3	0	0	7	**10**
**Dolphins**	0	6	0	16	**22**

at Hard Rock Stadium, Miami Gardens, Florida

- Date: November 11
- Game time: 8:20 p.m. EST
- Game weather: Partly cloudy, 77 °F (25 °C)
- Game attendance: 65,948
- Referee: Ronald Torbert
- TV announcers (Fox/NFLN/Prime Video): Joe Buck, Troy Aikman, Erin Andrews, and Kristina Pink
- Recap, Game Book

Game information

**First quarter**

- BAL – Justin Tucker 46-yard field goal, 9:48. Ravens 3–0. **Drive: 9 plays, 47 yards, 5:12.**

**Second quarter**

- MIA – Jason Sanders 31-yard field goal, 6:18. Tied 3–3. **Drive: 10 plays, 46 yards, 5:14.**
- MIA – Jason Sanders 22-yard field goal, 0:03. Dolphins 6–3. **Drive: 8 plays, 84 yards, 0:48.**

**Third quarter**

- No scoring plays.

**Fourth quarter**

- MIA – Jason Sanders 29-yard field goal, 12:34. Dolphins 9–3. **Drive: 7 plays, 53 yards, 4:05.**
- MIA – Xavien Howard 49-yard fumble return (pass failed), 11:23. Dolphins 15–3.
- BAL – Mark Andrews 5-yard pass from Lamar Jackson (Justin Tucker kick), 4:12. Dolphins 15–10. **Drive: 9 plays, 99 yards, 3:28.**
- MIA – Tua Tagovailoa 1-yard run (Jason Sanders kick), 2:19. Dolphins 22–10. **Drive: 6 plays, 75 yards, 1:53.**

**Top passers**

- BAL – Lamar Jackson – 26/43, 238 yards, TD, INT
- MIA – Tua Tagovailoa – 8/13, 158 yards

**Top rushers**

- BAL – Lamar Jackson – 9 rushes, 39 yards
- MIA – Myles Gaskin – 14 rushes, 31 yards

**Top receivers**

- BAL – Rashod Bateman – 6 receptions, 80 yards
- MIA – Albert Wilson – 4 receptions, 87 yards

==== Week 11: at New York Jets ====
Week 11: Miami Dolphins at New York Jets – Game summary

Quarter	1	2	3	4	Total
**Dolphins**	7	0	7	10	**24**
Jets	7	0	7	3	**17**

at MetLife Stadium, East Rutherford, New Jersey

- Date: November 21
- Game time: 1:00 p.m. EST
- Game weather: Mostly sunny, 54 °F (12 °C)
- Game attendance: 72,303
- Referee: Alex Kemp
- TV announcers (CBS): Greg Gumbel, Adam Archuleta, and AJ Ross
- Recap, Game Book

Game information

**First quarter**

- MIA – Jaylen Waddle 1-yard run (Jason Sanders kick), 9:04. Dolphins 7–0. **Drive: 11 plays, 83 yards, 5:56.**
- NYJ – Jamison Crowder 2-yard pass from Joe Flacco (Matt Ammendola kick), 3:00. Tied 7–7. **Drive: 5 plays, 40 yards, 1:43.**

**Second quarter**

- No scoring plays.

**Third quarter**

- MIA – Mack Hollins 65-yard pass from Tua Tagovailoa (Jason Sanders kick), 9:06. Dolphins 14–7. **Drive: 4 plays, 90 yards, 2:13.**
- NYJ – Elijah Moore 62-yard pass from Joe Flacco (Matt Ammendola kick), 2:59. Tied 14–14. **Drive: 3 plays, 64 yards, 0:50.**

**Fourth quarter**

- MIA – Myles Gaskin 5-yard pass from Tua Tagovailoa (Jason Sanders kick), 10:15. Dolphins 21–14. **Drive: 14 plays, 75 yards, 7:44.**
- MIA – Jason Sanders 24-yard field goal, 1:57. Dolphins 24–14. **Drive: 12 plays, 45 yards, 6:53.**
- NYJ – Matt Ammendola 35-yard field goal, 0:15. Dolphins 24–17. **Drive: 8 plays, 54 yards, 1:42.**

**Top passers**

- MIA – Tua Tagovailoa – 27/33, 273 yards, 2 TD, INT
- NYJ – Joe Flacco – 24/39, 291 yards, 2 TD

**Top rushers**

- MIA – Myles Gaskin – 23 rushes, 89 yards
- NYJ – Michael Carter – 9 rushes, 63 yards

**Top receivers**

- MIA – Mack Hollins – 2 receptions, 72 yards, TD
- NYJ – Elijah Moore – 8 receptions, 141 yards, TD

==== Week 12: vs. Carolina Panthers ====
Week 12: Carolina Panthers at Miami Dolphins – Game summary

Quarter	1	2	3	4	Total
Panthers	7	3	0	0	**10**
**Dolphins**	7	14	6	6	**33**

at Hard Rock Stadium, Miami Gardens, Florida

- Date: November 28
- Game time: 1:00 p.m. EST
- Game weather: Mostly sunny, 77 °F (25 °C)
- Game attendance: 62,389
- Referee: John Hussey
- TV announcers (Fox): Chris Myers, Daryl Johnston, and Jen Hale
- Recap, Game Book

Game information

**First quarter**

- MIA – Justin Coleman 2-yard return of blocked punt (Jason Sanders kick), 9:11. Dolphins 7–0.
- CAR – Cam Newton 1-yard run (Zane Gonzalez kick), 6:01. Tied 7–7. **Drive: 6 plays, 75 yards, 3:10.**

**Second quarter**

- MIA – Jaylen Waddle 9-yard pass from Tua Tagovailoa (Jason Sanders kick), 9:01. Dolphins 14–7. **Drive: 3 plays, 9 yards, 1:26.**
- MIA – Myles Gaskin 3-yard run (Jason Sanders kick), 4:26. Dolphins 21–7. **Drive: 6 plays, 73 yards, 2:53.**
- CAR – Zane Gonzalez 41-yard field goal, 0:00. Dolphins 21–10. **Drive: 1 play, 0 yards, 0:01.**

**Third quarter**

- MIA – Myles Gaskin 3-yard run (kick failed, hit left upright), 4:11. Dolphins 27–10. **Drive: 13 plays, 80 yards, 7:24.**

**Fourth quarter**

- MIA – Jason Sanders 46-yard field goal, 10:58. Dolphins 30–10. **Drive: 10 plays, 19 yards, 6:34.**
- MIA – Jason Sanders 33-yard field goal, 3:41. Dolphins 33–10. **Drive: 10 plays, 23 yards, 5:22.**

**Top passers**

- CAR – Cam Newton – 5/21, 92 yards, 2 INT
- MIA – Tua Tagovailoa – 27/31, 230 yards, TD

**Top rushers**

- CAR – Christian McCaffrey – 10 rushes, 35 yards
- MIA – Myles Gaskin – 16 rushes, 49 yards, 2 TD

**Top receivers**

- CAR – D. J. Moore – 4 receptions, 103 yards
- MIA – Jaylen Waddle – 9 receptions, 137 yards, TD

==== Week 13: vs. New York Giants ====
Week 13: New York Giants at Miami Dolphins – Game summary

Quarter	1	2	3	4	Total
Giants	0	3	3	3	**9**
**Dolphins**	0	10	0	10	**20**

at Hard Rock Stadium, Miami Gardens, Florida

- Date: December 5
- Game time: 1:00 p.m. EST
- Game weather: Partly sunny, 82 °F (28 °C)
- Game attendance: 65,898
- Referee: Brad Allen
- TV announcers (Fox): Chris Myers, Daryl Johnston and Jen Hale
- Recap, Game Book

Game information

**First quarter**

- No scoring plays.

**Second quarter**

- NYG – Graham Gano 39-yard field goal, 13:12. Giants 3–0. **Drive: 7 plays, 16 yards, 2:37.**
- MIA – Jason Sanders 48-yard field goal, 7:07. Tied 3–3. **Drive: 11 plays, 47 yards, 6:05.**
- MIA – Mack Hollins 5-yard pass from Tua Tagovailoa (Jason Sanders kick), 0:26. Dolphins 10–3. **Drive: 14 plays, 89 yards, 3:52.**

**Third quarter**

- NYG – Graham Gano 34-yard field goal, 10:29. Dolphins 10–6. **Drive: 10 plays, 69 yards, 3:31.**

**Fourth quarter**

- MIA – Isaiah Ford 2-yard pass from Tua Tagovailoa (Jason Sanders kick), 11:06. Dolphins 17–6. **Drive: 7 plays, 61 yards, 3:45.**
- NYG – Graham Gano 51-yard field goal, 4:59. Dolphins 17–9. **Drive: 10 plays, 25 yards, 3:43.**
- MIA – Jason Sanders 48-yard field goal, 1:11. Dolphins 20–9. **Drive: 10 plays, 45 yards, 3:48.**

**Top passers**

- NYG – Mike Glennon – 23/44, 187 yards, INT
- MIA – Tua Tagovailoa – 30/41, 244 yards, 2 TD

**Top rushers**

- NYG – Saquon Barkley – 11 rushes, 55 yards
- MIA – Myles Gaskin – 15 rushes, 44 yards

**Top receivers**

- NYG – Evan Engram – 4 receptions, 61 yards
- MIA – Jaylen Waddle – 9 receptions, 90 yards

The Dolphins defeated the Giants at home for the first time in franchise history, and defeated them for the first time since 2003. The 2021 Dolphins also became the first team since the 1994 Giants to win at least 5 straight games after losing 7 in a row. Quarterback Tua Tagovailoa became the first Dolphins quarterback since Dan Marino in 1994 to throw at least 21 completions in the first half of a game.

==== Week 15: vs. New York Jets ====
Week 15: New York Jets at Miami Dolphins – Game summary

Quarter	1	2	3	4	Total
Jets	10	7	0	7	**24**
**Dolphins**	0	10	7	14	**31**

at Hard Rock Stadium, Miami Gardens, Florida

- Date: December 19
- Game time: 1:00 p.m. EST
- Game weather: Partly sunny, 79 °F (26 °C)
- Game attendance: 66,035
- Referee: Ronald Torbert
- TV announcers (CBS): Greg Gumbel, Adam Archuleta and AJ Ross
- Recap, Game Book

Game information

**First quarter**

- NYJ – Braxton Berrios 2-yard run (Eddy Pineiro kick), 7:02. Jets 7–0. **Drive: 10 plays, 83 yards, 6:04.**
- NYJ – Eddy Pineiro 27-yard field goal, 4:30. Jets 10–0. **Drive: 6 plays, 16 yards, 2:19.**

**Second quarter**

- MIA – Duke Johnson 1-yard run (Jason Sanders kick), 13:42. Jets 10–7. **Drive: 8 plays, 68 yards, 4:01.**
- NYJ – Zach Wilson 1-yard run (Eddy Pineiro kick), 9:29. Jets 17–7. **Drive: 8 plays, 75 yards, 4:13.**
- MIA – Jason Sanders 24-yard field goal, 1:59. Jets 17–10. **Drive: 14 plays, 69 yards, 7:30.**

**Third quarter**

- MIA – Duke Johnson 2-yard run (Jason Sanders kick), 9:44. Tied 17–17. **Drive: 8 plays, 78 yards, 3:36.**

**Fourth quarter**

- MIA – Christian Wilkins 1-yard pass from Tua Tagovailoa (Jason Sanders kick), 14:23. Dolphins 24–17. **Drive: 12 plays, 58 yards, 6:35.**
- NYJ – Brandin Echols 20-yard interception return (Eddy Pineiro kick), 7:45. Tied 24–24.
- MIA – DeVante Parker 11-yard pass from Tua Tagovailoa (Jason Sanders kick), 3:37. Dolphins 31–24. **Drive: 9 plays, 75 yards, 4:08.**

**Top passers**

- NYJ – Zach Wilson – 13/23, 170 yards
- MIA – Tua Tagovailoa – 16/27, 196 yards, 2 TD, 2 INT

**Top rushers**

- NYJ – Tevin Coleman – 8 rushes, 50 yards
- MIA – Duke Johnson – 22 rushes, 107 yards, 2 TD

**Top receivers**

- NYJ – Jamison Crowder – 5 receptions, 40 yards
- MIA – DeVante Parker – 4 receptions, 68 yards, TD

This was the Dolphins' first time since 1997 that they swept the Jets in back-to-back years.

==== Week 16: at New Orleans Saints ====
Week 16: Miami Dolphins at New Orleans Saints – Game summary

Quarter	1	2	3	4	Total
**Dolphins**	10	0	7	3	**20**
Saints	0	3	0	0	**3**

at Caesars Superdome, New Orleans, Louisiana

- Date: December 27
- Game time: 8:15 p.m. EST/7:15 p.m. CST
- Game weather: None (indoor stadium)
- Game attendance: 69,170
- Referee: Adrian Hill
- TV announcers (ESPN): Steve Levy, Brian Griese, Louis Riddick, Laura Rutledge, and John Parry
- Recap, Game Book

Game information

**First quarter**

- MIA – Nik Needham 28-yard interception return (Jason Sanders kick), 10:25. Dolphins 7–0.
- MIA – Jason Sanders 48-yard field goal, 2:09. Dolphins 10–0. **Drive: 12 plays, 39 yards, 6:42.**

**Second quarter**

- NO – Brett Maher 38-yard field goal, 2:45. Dolphins 10–3. **Drive: 8 plays, 55 yards, 4:39.**

**Third quarter**

- MIA – Jaylen Waddle 1-yard pass from Tua Tagovailoa (Jason Sanders kick), 5:10. Dolphins 17–3. **Drive: 9 plays, 86 yards, 4:30.**

**Fourth quarter**

- MIA – Jason Sanders 34-yard field goal, 12:05. Dolphins 20–3. **Drive: 6 plays, 22 yards, 2:12.**

**Top passers**

- MIA – Tua Tagovailoa – 19/26, 198 yards, TD, INT
- NO – Ian Book – 12/20, 135 yards, 2 INT

**Top rushers**

- MIA – Duke Johnson – 13 rushes, 39 yards
- NO – Alvin Kamara – 13 rushes, 52 yards

**Top receivers**

- MIA – Jaylen Waddle – 10 receptions, 92 yards, TD
- NO – Lil'Jordan Humphrey – 3 receptions, 70 yards

With the win against a depleted Saints team who had 20 players on their IL, the Dolphins improved to 8–7, and became the first team in NFL history to win 7 straight games after losing 7 straight games. This was their first 7-game winning streak since 1985, during the Don Shula and Dan Marino era and their first win over the Saints since 2005. It was also their first road win over the Saints since 1986. Wide receiver Jaylen Waddle caught 10 receptions, the most by a rookie wide receiver in a single Monday Night game since Jerry Rice in 1985.

==== Week 17: at Tennessee Titans ====
Week 17: Miami Dolphins at Tennessee Titans – Game summary

Quarter	1	2	3	4	Total
Dolphins	0	3	0	0	**3**
**Titans**	7	10	0	17	**34**

at Nissan Stadium, Nashville, Tennessee

- Date: January 2
- Game time: 1:00 p.m. EST/12:00 p.m. CST
- Game weather: Cloudy, 36 °F (2 °C)
- Game attendance: 69,091
- Referee: Shawn Smith
- TV announcers (CBS): Kevin Harlan, Trent Green and Melanie Collins
- Recap, Game Book

Game information

**First quarter**

- TEN – Geoff Swaim 1-yard pass from Ryan Tannehill, (Randy Bullock kick) 1:24. Titans 7–0. **Drive: 8 plays, 46 yards, 4:11.**

**Second quarter**

- TEN – Randy Bullock 23-yard field goal, 14:15. Titans 10–0. **Drive: 4 plays, 9 yards, 1:50.**
- MIA – Jason Sanders 39-yard field goal, 9:43. Titans 10–3. **Drive: 10 plays, 54 yards, 4:32.**
- TEN – D'Onta Foreman 21-yard run (Randy Bullock kick), 3:18. Titans 17–3. **Drive: 11 plays, 75 yards, 6:25.**

**Third quarter**

- No scoring plays.

**Fourth quarter**

- TEN – Anthony Firkser 15-yard pass from Ryan Tannehill (Randy Bullock kick), 7:42. Titans 24–3. **Drive: 5 plays, 58 yards, 2:38.**
- TEN – Randy Bullock 44-yard field goal, 2:58. Titans 27–3. **Drive: 7 plays, 18 yards, 2:46.**
- TEN – Dontrell Hilliard 39-yard run (Randy Bullock kick), 1:53. Titans 34–3. **Drive: 3 plays, 38 yards, 0:56.**

**Top passers**

- MIA – Tua Tagovailoa – 18/38, 205 yards, INT
- TEN – Ryan Tannehill – 13/18, 120 yards, 2 TD

**Top rushers**

- MIA – Duke Johnson – 7 rushes, 49 yards
- TEN – D'Onta Foreman – 26 rushes, 132 yards, TD

**Top receivers**

- MIA – Mike Gesicki – 4 receptions, 51 yards
- TEN – A. J. Brown – 2 receptions, 41 yards

This was Titans quarterback Ryan Tannehill's first time playing his former team since the Dolphins traded him following the 2018 season. Tannehill had played for the Dolphins from 2012–2018 as their primary starter aside from missing the 2017 season due a torn ACL he suffered during the preseason that year. The Dolphins' seven-game win streak was snapped by the 34–3 loss and failed to win 8 games in a row for the first time since 1984; because of this and the Buffalo Bills beating and eliminating the Atlanta Falcons and clinching playoff berth, the New England Patriots blowing out the Jacksonville Jaguars and clinching playoff berth, the Las Vegas Raiders beating the Indianapolis Colts, and the Los Angeles Chargers beating the Denver Broncos, the Dolphins missed the playoffs for the fifth season in a row. Additionally, the Chargers win also crushed all playoff hopes for the Denver Broncos, as well as the Cleveland Browns, who were scheduled to kick off Sunday Night Football later that evening.

==== Week 18: vs. New England Patriots ====
Week 18: New England Patriots at Miami Dolphins – Game summary

Quarter	1	2	3	4	Total
Patriots	0	7	3	14	**24**
**Dolphins**	14	3	7	9	**33**

at Hard Rock Stadium, Miami Gardens, Florida

- Date: January 9
- Game time: 4:25 p.m. EST
- Game weather: Cloudy, 76 °F (24 °C)
- Game attendance: 66,514
- Referee: Alex Kemp
- TV announcers (CBS): Spero Dedes, Jay Feely and Jenny Dell
- Recap, Game Book

Game information

**First quarter**

- MIA – Jaylen Waddle 7-yard pass from Tua Tagovailoa (Jason Sanders kick), 7:34. Dolphins 7–0. **Drive: 13 plays, 77 yards, 7:26.**
- MIA – Xavien Howard 37-yard interception return (Jason Sanders kick), 6:07. Dolphins 14–0.

**Second quarter**

- MIA – Jason Sanders 30-yard field goal 11:09. Dolphins 17–0. **Drive: 15 plays, 77 yards, 6:58.**
- NE – Brandon Bolden 15-yard run (Nick Folk kick), 7:36. Dolphins 17–7. **Drive: 7 plays, 74 yards, 3:33.**

**Third quarter**

- NE – Nick Folk 43-yard field goal 8:27. Dolphins 17–10. **Drive: 13 plays, 50 yards, 6:33.**
- MIA – Duke Johnson 1-yard run (Jason Sanders kick), 4:31. Dolphins 24–10. **Drive: 8 plays, 75 yards, 3:56.**

**Fourth quarter**

- MIA – Jason Sanders 49-yard field goal 10:55. Dolphins 27–10. **Drive: 10 plays, 45 yards, 6:30.**
- NE – Brandon Bolden 18-yard pass from Mac Jones (Nick Folk kick), 6:32. Dolphins 27–17. **Drive: 10 plays, 75 yards, 4:23.**
- NE – Damien Harris 1-yard run (Nick Folk kick), 2:53. Dolphins 27–24. **Drive: 6 plays, 76 yards, 1:56.**
- MIA – Sam Eguavoen 0-yard fumble return, 0:00. Dolphins 33–24.

**Top passers**

- NE – Mac Jones – 20/30, 261 yards, TD, INT
- MIA – Tua Tagovailoa – 15/22, 109 yards, TD

**Top rushers**

- NE – Brandon Bolden – 7 rushes, 46 yards, TD
- MIA – Duke Johnson – 25 rushes, 117 yards, TD

**Top receivers**

- NE – Hunter Henry – 5 receptions, 86 yards
- MIA – Durham Smythe – 2 receptions, 32 yards

This was the Dolphins' first sweep of the Patriots since 2000 and their second under Bill Belichick's tenure. It was also first time since the 2002 and 2003 seasons that the Dolphins had clinched back-to-back winning seasons. Recording his 102nd reception early in the 1st quarter, wide receiver Jaylen Waddle became the all-time leader in receptions caught by a rookie wide receiver, surpassing Anquan Boldin, whom caught 101 receptions in his 2003 rookie season with the Arizona Cardinals. With the win, the Dolphins finished the season with a record of 9–8, but head coach Brian Flores was dismissed the next day.

=== Standings ===
==== Division ====
AFC East
	W	L	T	PCT	DIV	CONF	PF	PA	STK
^{(3)} Buffalo Bills	11	6	0	.647	5–1	7–5	483	289	W4
^{(6)} New England Patriots	10	7	0	.588	3–3	8–4	462	303	L1
Miami Dolphins	9	8	0	.529	4–2	6–6	341	373	W1
New York Jets	4	13	0	.235	0–6	4–8	310	504	L2

==== Conference ====
AFC
#	Team	Division	W	L	T	PCT	DIV	CONF	SOS	SOV	STK
**Division winners**
1 (Note: Tennessee finished ahead of Kansas City based on head-to-head victory, claiming the No. 1 seed.)	Tennessee Titans	South	12	5	0	.706	5–1	8–4	.472	.480	W3
2	Kansas City Chiefs	West	12	5	0	.706	5–1	7–5	.538	.517	W1
3	Buffalo Bills	East	11	6	0	.647	5–1	7–5	.472	.428	W4
4	Cincinnati Bengals	North	10	7	0	.588	4–2	8–4	.472	.462	L1
**Wild cards**
5 (Note: Las Vegas claimed the No. 5 seed over New England based on win percentage in common games (5–1 vs. 2–4 against: Miami, Dallas, LA Chargers, Cleveland, and Indianapolis).)	Las Vegas Raiders	West	10	7	0	.588	3–3	8–4	.510	.515	W4
6	New England Patriots	East	10	7	0	.588	3–3	8–4	.481	.394	L1
7	Pittsburgh Steelers	North	9	7	1	.559	4–2	7–5	.521	.490	W2
**Did not qualify for the postseason**
8 (Note: Indianapolis finished ahead of Miami and Los Angeles based on conference record (7–5 vs. 6–6).)	Indianapolis Colts	South	9	8	0	.529	3–3	7–5	.495	.431	L2
9 (Note: Miami finished ahead of LA Chargers based on win percentage in common games (5–1 vs. 2–4 against: New England, Las Vegas, Houston, Baltimore, and NY Giants).)	Miami Dolphins	East	9	8	0	.529	4–2	6–6	.464	.379	W1
10	Los Angeles Chargers	West	9	8	0	.529	3–3	6–6	.510	.500	L1
11 (Note: Cleveland finished ahead of Baltimore based on division record (3–3 vs. 1–5).)	Cleveland Browns	North	8	9	0	.471	3–3	5–7	.514	.415	W1
12	Baltimore Ravens	North	8	9	0	.471	1–5	5–7	.531	.460	L6
13	Denver Broncos	West	7	10	0	.412	1–5	3–9	.484	.357	L4
14 (Note: NY Jets finished ahead of Houston based on head-to-head victory.)	New York Jets	East	4	13	0	.235	0–6	4–8	.512	.426	L2
15	Houston Texans	South	4	13	0	.235	3–3	4–8	.498	.397	L2
16	Jacksonville Jaguars	South	3	14	0	.176	1–5	3–9	.512	.569	W1
**Tiebreakers** (Note: When breaking ties for three or more teams under the NFL's rules, they are first broken within divisions, then comparing only the highest-ranked remaining team from each division.)
