= Robert Jones (offensive lineman) =

American football player (born 1999)

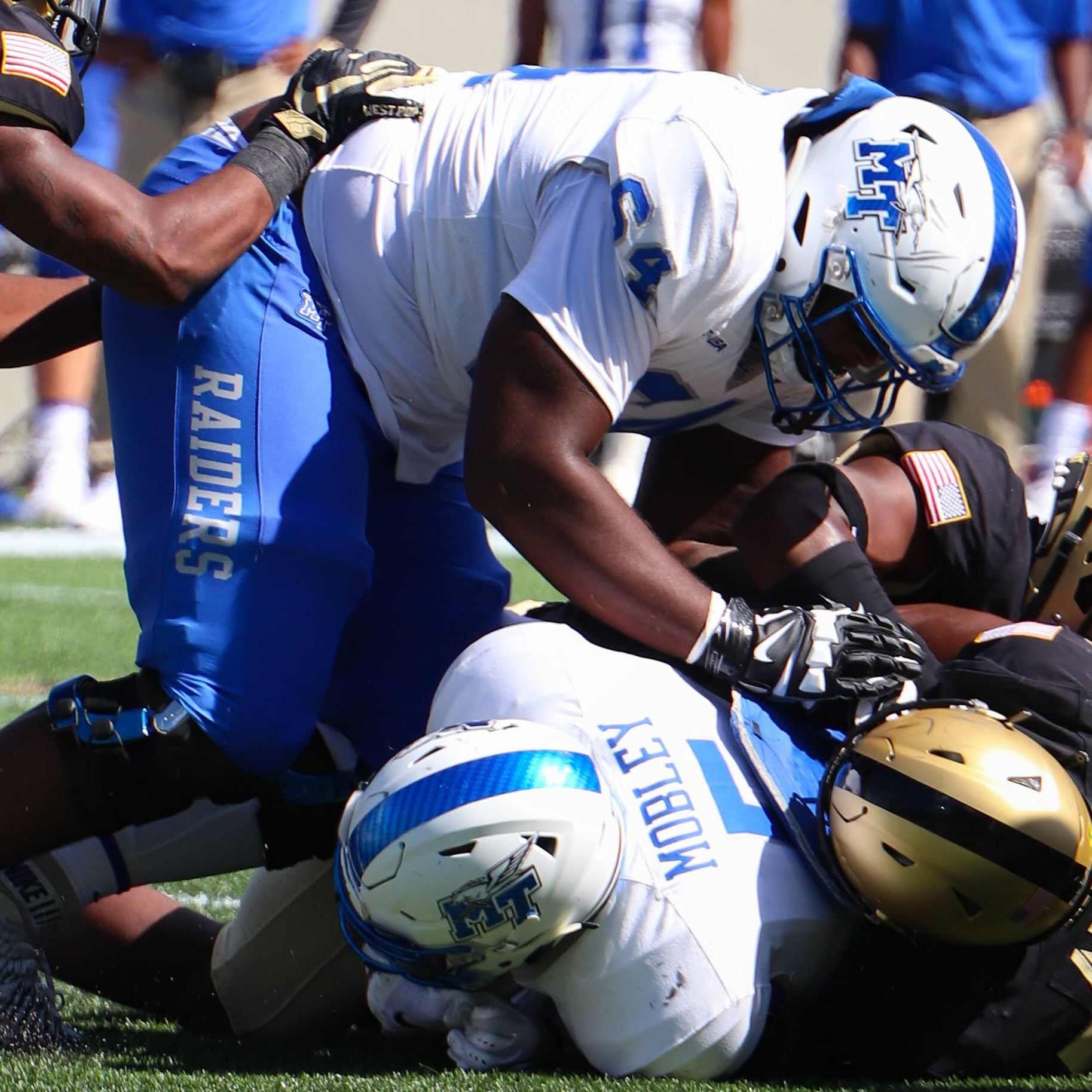
- Jones with Middle Tennessee State in 2020

Profile
- Position: Guard

Personal information
- Born: January 28, 1999 (age 27); Rockford, Illinois, U.S.
- Listed height: 6 ft 4 in (1.93 m)
- Listed weight: 322 lb (146 kg)

Career information
- High school: Rockford East
- College: Highland CC (2017–2018); Middle Tennessee (2019–2020)
- NFL draft: 2021: undrafted

Career history
- Miami Dolphins (2021–2024); Dallas Cowboys (2025); San Francisco 49ers (2026)*
- * Offseason or practice squad member only

Career NFL statistics as of 2025
- Games played: 49
- Games Started: 30
- Stats at Pro Football Reference

Robert Jones (born January 28, 1999) is an American professional football offensive guard. He played college football for the Middle Tennessee Blue Raiders, and was signed by the Miami Dolphins as an undrafted free agent following the 2021 NFL draft.

== Professional career ==
Pre-draft measurables
Height	Weight	Arm length	Hand span	Wingspan	40-yard dash	10-yard split	20-yard split	20-yard shuttle	Three-cone drill	Vertical jump	Broad jump
6 ft 4 1/4 in (1.94 m)	307 lb (139 kg)	33 in (0.84 m)	9 5/8 in (0.24 m)	6 ft 7 in (2.01 m)	5.31 s	1.83 s	2.89 s	4.84 s	8.16 s	31.0 in (0.79 m)	8 ft 5 in (2.57 m)
All values from Pro Day

=== Miami Dolphins ===
Following the 2021 NFL draft, Jones signed with the Miami Dolphins as an undrafted free agent and made the final roster for the season following roster cuts in August. He made his NFL debut in Week 2 of the 2021 season against the Buffalo Bills.

Jones got his first NFL start at right tackle on January 9, 2022, during the last week of the 2021 NFL regular season against the New England Patriots.

On August 31, 2023, Jones was placed on injured reserve. He was activated on October 14.

Jones re-signed with the Dolphins on a one-year deal on March 10, 2024.

=== Dallas Cowboys ===
On March 11, 2025, Jones signed a one-year, $4.75 million contract with the Dallas Cowboys. He suffered a broken bone in his neck during training camp and was placed on season-ending injured reserve on August 8.

=== San Francisco 49ers ===
On March 24, 2026, Jones signed with the San Francisco 49ers on a one-year, $2 million contract. On August 30, he was released by San Francisco as a part of final roster cuts.
