= 2021 Buffalo Bills season =

62nd season in franchise history

- Owner: Terry and Kim Pegula
- General manager: Brandon Beane
- Head coach: Sean McDermott
- Offensive coordinator: Brian Daboll
- Defensive coordinator: Leslie Frazier
- Home stadium: Highmark Stadium

Results
- Record: 11–6
- Division place: 1st AFC East
- Playoffs: Won Wild Card Playoffs (vs. Patriots) 47–17; Lost Divisional Playoffs (at Chiefs) 36–42 (OT)
- All-Pros: SS Jordan Poyer (1st team); FS Micah Hyde (2nd team)
- Pro Bowlers: OT Dion Dawkins; WR Stefon Diggs

Uniform
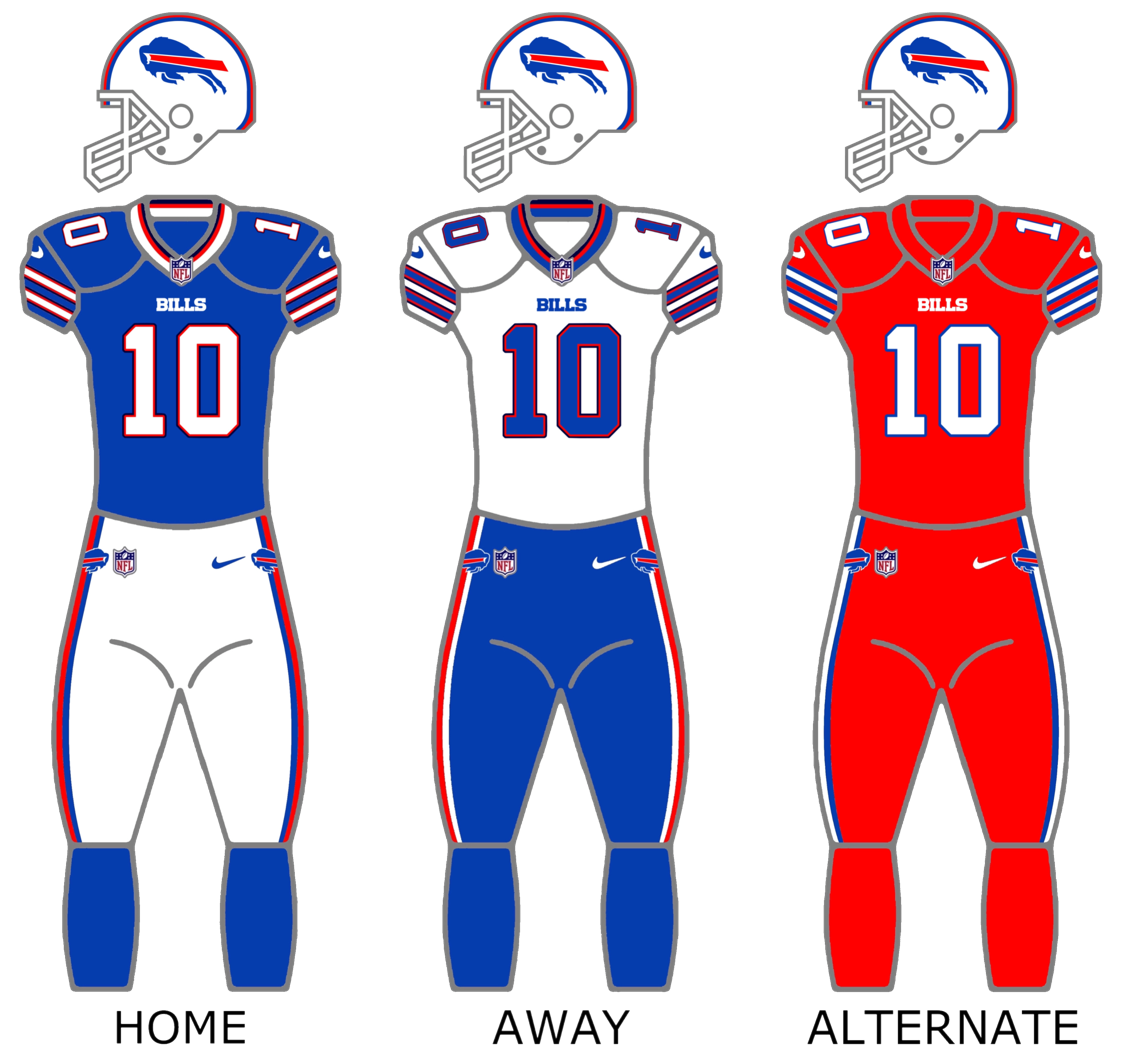

The 2021 season was the Buffalo Bills '62nd in the National Football League (NFL), seventh full under the ownership of Terry and Kim Pegula, and their fifth under the head coach/general manager tandem of Sean McDermott and Brandon Beane.

Although unable to match or improve on their 13–3 record from the previous season, the Bills clinched the AFC East for a second straight year, their first consecutive division title since 1991. They finished the regular season at 11–6 to obtain the #3 seed for the playoffs, also marking their third consecutive postseason berth and fourth in five years. Statistically, the Bills had the No. 1-ranked defense, as well as the highest point differential and margin of victory. All of the team's victories were by multiple possessions, but with the exception of their week 11 loss to the Indianapolis Colts, they lost every game that was within one possession.

The Bills defeated their AFC East rival New England Patriots in the wild card round, a game marked by them becoming the first NFL team to score a touchdown on every offensive drive. Facing the Kansas City Chiefs in a Divisional Round matchup, the Bills lost amid a quarterback duel between Buffalo's Josh Allen and Kansas City's Patrick Mahomes. Although the Bills were able to take a three-point lead with 13 seconds remaining, the Chiefs scored a game-tying field goal on their following drive and won in overtime, with Josh Allen and the Bills' offense never getting to touch the ball in overtime. The defeat marked the second consecutive year the Bills were eliminated by the Chiefs.

The season also saw Pittsburgh-based health insurance company Highmark purchase the rights to the Bills' stadium, resulting in it being named Highmark Stadium.

== Draft ==
2021 Buffalo Bills Draft
Round	Selection	Player	Position	College	Notes
1	30	Gregory Rousseau	DE	Miami (FL)	Opted out of the 2020 CFB season while at the University of Miami
2	61	Carlos Basham Jr.	DE	Wake Forest	
3	93	Spencer Brown	OT	Northern Iowa	
5	161	Tommy Doyle	OT	Miami (OH)	from Las Vegas
6	203	Marquez Stevenson	WR	Houston	from Washington via Las Vegas and Miami and Houston
6	212	Damar Hamlin	S	Pittsburgh	from New Orleans via Houston
6	213	Rachad Wildgoose	CB	Wisconsin	
7	236	Jack Anderson	OG	Texas Tech	from Carolina

Notes

- The Bills received a fifth-round selection from the Las Vegas Raiders in exchange for wide receiver Zay Jones.
- The Bills got a conditional seventh-round selection from the Carolina Panthers in exchange for offensive tackle Marshall Newhouse.

== Staff ==
2021 Buffalo Bills staff
Front office: Owner/CEO – Terry Pegula; Owner/president – Kim Pegula; General manager – Brandon Beane; Assistant general manager – Joe Schoen; Director of college scouting – Terrance Gray; Senior VP of football administration – Jim Overdorf; Assistant director of college scouting – Lake Dawson; Director of pro personnel – Malik Boyd; Director of football administration – Kevin Meganck; Director of football operations – Brendan Rowe; Head coaches: Head coach – Sean McDermott; Assistant head coach/defensive coordinator – Leslie Frazier; Offensive coaches: Offensive coordinator – Brian Daboll; Quarterbacks/passing game coordinator – Ken Dorsey; Assistant quarterbacks – Shea Tierney; Running backs – Kelly Skipper; Wide receivers – Chad Hall; Assistant wide receivers/game management – Marc Lubick; Tight ends – Rob Boras; Offensive line – Bobby Johnson; Assistant offensive line – Ryan Wendell	Defensive coaches: Defensive line – Eric Washington; Assistant defensive line – Jacques Cesaire; Linebackers – Bob Babich; Defensive backs – John Butler; Safeties – Bobby Babich; Nickel – Jim Salgado; Special teams coaches: Special teams coordinator – Heath Farwell; Assistant special teams – Matthew Smiley; Strength and conditioning: Head strength and conditioning – Eric Ciano; Assistant strength and conditioning – Will Greenberg; Assistant strength and conditioning – Hal Luther; Strength and conditioning assistant – Nicholas Lacy; Strength and conditioning assistant – Jason Oszvart

== Final roster ==
2021 Buffalo Bills roster
Quarterbacks (QB): 17 Josh Allen; 10 Mitchell Trubisky; Running backs (RB): 22 Matt Breida; 41 Reggie Gilliam; 25 Taiwan Jones; 20 Zack Moss; 26 Devin Singletary; Wide receivers (WR): 11 Cole Beasley; 13 Gabe Davis; 14 Stefon Diggs; 15 Jake Kumerow; 19 Isaiah McKenzie; 1 Emmanuel Sanders; 5 Marquez Stevenson; Tight ends (TE): 88 Dawson Knox; 89 Tommy Sweeney	Offensive linemen (OL): 71 Ryan Bates G/C; 79 Spencer Brown T; 73 Dion Dawkins T; 72 Tommy Doyle T; 76 Jon Feliciano G; 74 Cody Ford G; 68 Bobby Hart T; 60 Mitch Morse C; 75 Daryl Williams T/G; Defensive linemen (DL): 97 Mario Addison DE; 96 Boogie Basham DE; 94 Vernon Butler DT; 57 A. J. Epenesa DE; 55 Jerry Hughes DE; 98 Star Lotulelei DT; 93 Efe Obada DE; 91 Ed Oliver DT; 99 Harrison Phillips DT; 50 Greg Rousseau DE	Linebackers (LB): 53 Tyrel Dodson OLB; 49 Tremaine Edmunds MLB; 54 A. J. Klein OLB; 44 Tyler Matakevich MLB; 58 Matt Milano OLB; 9 Andre Smith OLB; Defensive backs (DB): 31 Damar Hamlin FS; 23 Micah Hyde FS; 30 Dane Jackson CB; 46 Jaquan Johnson SS; 24 Taron Johnson CB; 47 Cam Lewis CB; 33 Siran Neal CB; 21 Jordan Poyer SS; 39 Levi Wallace CB; Special teams (ST): 2 Tyler Bass K; 69 Reid Ferguson LS; 3 Matt Haack P	Practice squad: 51 Eli Ankou DT; 90 Brandin Bryant DT; 66 Jacob Capra G; 87 Tanner Gentry WR; 42 Joe Giles-Harris OLB; 6 Jamie Gillan P; 37 Olaijah Griffin CB; 29 Tim Harris CB; 16 Isaiah Hodgins WR; 67 Evin Ksiezarczyk T; 56 Mike Love DE; 38 Nick McCloud CB; 85 Quintin Morris TE; 36 Josh Thomas FS; 7 Davis Webb QB; 28 Antonio Williams RB; Reserve: 65 Ike Boettger G (IR); -- Bryan Cox Jr. DE (IR); 27 Tre'Davious White CB (IR); 61 Justin Zimmer DT (IR); Rookies in italics 53 active, 4 reserve, 16 practice squad

== Preseason ==
The Bills preseason schedule was announced on May 12. They opened the preseason with a 16–15 road win against the Detroit Lions.

Week	Date	Opponent	Result	Record	Venue	Recap
1	August 13	at Detroit Lions	W 16–15	1–0	Ford Field	Recap
2	August 21	at Chicago Bears	W 41–15	2–0	Soldier Field	Recap
3	August 28	Green Bay Packers	W 19–0	3–0	Highmark Stadium	Recap

== Regular season ==
=== Schedule ===
The Bills 2021 schedule was announced on May 12.

Week	Date	Opponent	Result	Record	Venue	Recap
1	September 12	Pittsburgh Steelers	**L** 16–23	0–1	Highmark Stadium	Recap
2	September 19	at **Miami Dolphins**	**W** 35–0	1–1	Hard Rock Stadium	Recap
3	September 26	Washington Football Team	**W** 43–21	2–1	Highmark Stadium	Recap
4	October 3	Houston Texans	**W** 40–0	3–1	Highmark Stadium	Recap
5	October 10	at Kansas City Chiefs	**W** 38–20	4–1	Arrowhead Stadium	Recap
6	October 18	at Tennessee Titans	**L** 31–34	4–2	Nissan Stadium	Recap
7	Bye					
8	October 31	**Miami Dolphins**	**W** 26–11	5–2	Highmark Stadium	Recap
9	November 7	at Jacksonville Jaguars	**L** 6–9	5–3	TIAA Bank Field	Recap
10	November 14	at **New York Jets**	**W** 45–17	6–3	MetLife Stadium	Recap
11	November 21	Indianapolis Colts	**L** 15–41	6–4	Highmark Stadium	Recap
12	November 25	at New Orleans Saints	**W** 31–6	7–4	Caesars Superdome	Recap
13	December 6	**New England Patriots**	**L** 10–14	7–5	Highmark Stadium	Recap
14	December 12	at Tampa Bay Buccaneers	**L** 27–33 (OT)	7–6	Raymond James Stadium	Recap
15	December 19	Carolina Panthers	**W** 31–14	8–6	Highmark Stadium	Recap
16	December 26	at **New England Patriots**	**W** 33–21	9–6	Gillette Stadium	Recap
17	January 2	Atlanta Falcons	**W** 29–15	10–6	Highmark Stadium	Recap
18	January 9	**New York Jets**	**W** 27–10	11–6	Highmark Stadium	Recap

Note: Intra-division opponents are in bold text.

=== Game summaries ===
==== Week 1: vs. Pittsburgh Steelers ====
Week 1: Pittsburgh Steelers at Buffalo Bills – Game summary

Quarter	1	2	3	4	Total
**Steelers**	0	0	6	17	**23**
Bills	3	7	0	6	**16**

at Highmark Stadium, Orchard Park, New York

- Date: September 12
- Game time: 1:00 p.m. EDT
- Game weather: Cloudy, 73 °F (23 °C)
- Game attendance: 69,787
- Referee: John Hussey
- TV announcers (CBS): Ian Eagle, Charles Davis, and Evan Washburn
- Recap, Game Book

Game information

**First quarter**

- BUF – Tyler Bass 37-yard field goal, 13:30. Bills 3–0. **Drive: 4 plays, 5 yards, 1:30.**

**Second quarter**

- BUF – Gabe Davis 3-yard pass from Josh Allen (Tyler Bass kick), 0:22. Bills 10–0. **Drive: 13 plays, 91 yards, 5:39.**

**Third quarter**

- PIT – Chris Boswell 24-yard field goal, 10:23. Bills 10–3. **Drive: 10 plays, 69 yards, 4:37.**
- PIT – Chris Boswell 20-yard field goal, 1:47. Bills 10–6. **Drive: 11 plays, 62 yards, 4:01.**

**Fourth quarter**

- PIT – Diontae Johnson 5-yard pass from Ben Roethlisberger (Chris Boswell kick), 11:19. Steelers 13–10. **Drive: 4 plays, 52 yards, 2:23.**
- PIT – Ulysees Gilbert 9-yard return of blocked punt (Chris Boswell kick), 9:45. Steelers 20–10.
- BUF – Tyler Bass 25-yard field goal, 5:23. Steelers 20–13. **Drive: 9 plays, 67 yards, 4:22.**
- PIT – Chris Boswell 45-yard field goal, 2:42. Steelers 23–13. **Drive: 9 plays, 48 yards, 2:41.**
- BUF – Tyler Bass 42-yard field goal, 0:46. Steelers 23–16. **Drive: 10 plays, 40 yards, 1:56.**

**Top passers**

- PIT – Ben Roethlisberger – 18/32, 188 yards, TD
- BUF – Josh Allen – 30/51, 270 yards, TD

**Top rushers**

- PIT – Najee Harris – 16 rushes, 45 yards
- BUF – Devin Singletary – 11 rushes, 72 yards

**Top receivers**

- PIT – JuJu Smith-Schuster – 4 receptions, 52 yards
- BUF – Stefon Diggs – 9 receptions, 69 yards

Despite a 10–0 halftime lead and a strong performance from the Buffalo defense, the Bills' hopes for a third straight Week 1 victory were dashed after Pittsburgh scored 20 unanswered points in the second half, including a blocked punt returned for a touchdown. The Bills were also hurt by several penalties throughout the game. With the loss, Buffalo began the season 0–1 for the first time since 2018.

==== Week 2: at Miami Dolphins ====
Week 2: Buffalo Bills at Miami Dolphins – Game summary

Quarter	1	2	3	4	Total
**Bills**	14	0	7	14	**35**
Dolphins	0	0	0	0	**0**

at Hard Rock Stadium, Miami Gardens, Florida

- Date: September 19
- Game time: 1:00 p.m. EDT
- Game weather: Mostly cloudy, 88 °F (31 °C)
- Game attendance: 65,040
- Referee: Craig Wrolstad
- TV announcers (Fox): Brandon Gaudin, Matt Millen, and Sarah Kustok
- Recap, Game Book

Game information

**First quarter**

- BUF – Devin Singletary 46-yard run (Tyler Bass kick), 12:33. Bills 7–0. **Drive: 2 plays, 46 yards, 0:12.**
- BUF – Stefon Diggs 5-yard pass from Josh Allen (Tyler Bass kick), 7:02. Bills 14–0. **Drive: 7 plays, 52 yards, 3:39.**

**Second quarter**

- No scoring plays

**Third quarter**

- BUF – Dawson Knox 8-yard pass from Josh Allen (Tyler Bass kick), 11:48. Bills 21–0. **Drive: 8 plays, 75 yards, 3:12.**

**Fourth quarter**

- BUF – Zack Moss 7-yard run (Tyler Bass kick), 13:38. Bills 28–0. **Drive: 11 plays, 41 yards, 5:21.**
- BUF – Zack Moss 1-yard run (Tyler Bass kick), 7:45. Bills 35–0. **Drive: 8 plays, 62 yards, 4:13.**

**Top passers**

- BUF – Josh Allen – 17/33, 179 yards, 2 TD, INT
- MIA – Jacoby Brissett – 24/40, 169 yards, INT

**Top rushers**

- BUF – Devin Singletary – 13 rushes, 82 yards, TD
- MIA – Myles Gaskin – 5 rushes, 25 yards

**Top receivers**

- BUF – Stefon Diggs – 4 receptions, 60 yards, TD
- MIA – Jaylen Waddle – 6 receptions, 48 yards

Buffalo rebounded from its loss the prior week with the most dominant win over division rival Miami in franchise history. Despite another mediocre performance by quarterback Josh Allen, a strong performance from running backs Devin Singletary and Zack Moss, as well as the defense, allowed the Bills to win 35–0. Dolphins quarterbacks Tua Tagovailoa and Jacoby Brissett were sacked six times, with Tagovailoa leaving the game in the first quarter after a rib injury.

==== Week 3: vs. Washington Football Team ====
Week 3: Washington Football Team at Buffalo Bills – Game summary

Quarter	1	2	3	4	Total
Washington	0	14	0	7	**21**
**Bills**	7	20	9	7	**43**

at Highmark Stadium, Orchard Park, New York

- Date: September 26
- Game time: 1:00 p.m. EDT
- Game weather: Sunny, 66 °F (19 °C)
- Game attendance: 68,434
- Referee: Tony Corrente
- TV announcers (Fox): Chris Myers, Daryl Johnston, and Jen Hale
- Recap, Game Book

Game information

**First quarter**

- BUF – Emmanuel Sanders 28-yard pass from Josh Allen (Tyler Bass kick), 10:53. Bills 7–0. **Drive: 8 plays, 75 yards, 4:07.**

**Second quarter**

- BUF – Zack Moss 7-yard pass from Josh Allen (Tyler Bass kick), 12:59. Bills 14–0. **Drive: 8 plays, 52 yards, 4:12.**
- BUF – Dawson Knox 14-yard pass from Josh Allen (Tyler Bass kick), 10:42. Bills 21–0. **Drive: 3 plays, 17 yards, 0:55.**
- WAS – Antonio Gibson 73-yard pass from Taylor Heinicke (Dustin Hopkins kick), 9:51. Bills 21–7. **Drive: 2 plays, 75 yards, 0:51.**
- WAS – Taylor Heinicke 4-yard run (Dustin Hopkins kick), 7:39. Bills 21–14. **Drive: 5 plays, 24 yards, 2:12.**
- BUF – Tyler Bass 21-yard field goal, 1:37. Bills 24–14. **Drive: 7 plays, 55 yards, 1:52.**
- BUF – Tyler Bass 48-yard field goal, 0:00. Bills 27–14. **Drive: 5 plays, 51 yards, 0:26.**

**Third quarter**

- BUF – Emmanuel Sanders 5-yard field pass from Josh Allen (pass failed), 4:43. Bills 33–14. **Drive: 17 plays, 93 yards, 8:17.**
- BUF – Tyler Bass 29-yard field goal, 2:11. Bills 36–14. **Drive: 4 plays, 6 yards, 0:53.**

**Fourth quarter**

- BUF – Josh Allen 2-yard run (Tyler Bass kick), 10:29. Bills 43–14. **Drive: 3 plays, 22 yards, 1:08.**
- WAS – Logan Thomas 2-yard pass from Taylor Heinicke (Dustin Hopkins kick), 5:21. Bills 43–21. **Drive: 10 plays, 75 yards, 5:08.**

**Top passers**

- WAS – Taylor Heinicke – 14/24, 212 yards, 2 TD, 2 INT
- BUF – Josh Allen – 32/43, 358 yards, 4 TD

**Top rushers**

- WAS – Antonio Gibson – 12 rushes, 31 yards
- BUF – Zack Moss – 13 rushes, 60 yards

**Top receivers**

- WAS – Antonio Gibson – 1 reception, 73 yards, TD
- BUF – Cole Beasley – 11 receptions, 98 yards

Josh Allen and the Bills' passing game enjoyed a strong performance, as Allen accounted for five total touchdowns and surpassed 300 passing yards for the first time in the season. Aside from a 73-yard scoring reception by running back Antonio Gibson and two scores from quarterback Taylor Heinicke set up by a Buffalo special teams gaffe and garbage time, respectively, Washington's offense struggled against the Bills defense. With another win, Buffalo improved to 2–1.

==== Week 4: vs. Houston Texans ====
Week 4: Houston Texans at Buffalo Bills – Game summary

Quarter	1	2	3	4	Total
Texans	0	0	0	0	**0**
**Bills**	7	9	3	21	**40**

at Highmark Stadium, Orchard Park, New York

- Date: October 3
- Game time: 1:00 p.m. EDT
- Game weather: Light rain, fog and mist, 67 °F (19 °C)
- Game attendance: 68,087
- Referee: Ronald Torbert
- TV announcers (CBS): Beth Mowins and Tiki Barber
- Recap, Game Book

Game information

**First quarter**

- BUF – Dawson Knox 25-yard pass from Josh Allen (Tyler Bass kick), 1:59. Bills 7–0. **Drive: 9 plays, 69 yards, 5:02.**

**Second quarter**

- BUF – Tyler Bass 33-yard field goal, 13:05. Bills 10–0. **Drive: 5 plays, 35 yards, 1:55.**
- BUF – Tyler Bass 26-yard field goal, 7:12. Bills 13–0. **Drive: 7 plays, 41 yards, 3:31.**
- BUF – Tyler Bass 21-yard field goal, 0:23. Bills 16–0. **Drive: 8 plays, 41 yards, 1:17.**

**Third quarter**

- BUF – Tyler Bass 28-yard field goal, 8:45. Bills 19–0. **Drive: 11 plays, 65 yards, 6:15.**

**Fourth quarter**

- BUF – Dawson Knox 1-yard pass from Josh Allen (Tyler Bass kick), 13:29. Bills 26–0. **Drive: 11 plays, 84 yards, 6:49.**
- BUF – Zack Moss 4-yard run (Tyler Bass kick), 10:44. Bills 33–0. **Drive: 4 plays, 27 yards, 2:15.**
- BUF – Mitchell Trubisky 4-yard run (Tyler Bass kick), 3:36. Bills 40–0. **Drive: 7 plays, 53 yards, 4:27.**

**Top passers**

- HOU – Davis Mills – 11/21, 87 yards, 4 INT
- BUF – Josh Allen – 20/29, 248 yards, 2 TD, INT

**Top rushers**

- HOU – Mark Ingram II – 6 rushes, 24 yards
- BUF – Devin Singletary – 14 rushes, 79 yards

**Top receivers**

- HOU – Brandin Cooks – 5 receptions, 47 yards
- BUF – Stefon Diggs – 7 receptions, 114 yards

Buffalo faced Houston for the first time since a 22–19 overtime loss in the 2019–20 NFL playoffs. Despite an early interception, Allen completed two touchdown passes to tight end Dawson Knox and led the Bills to 33 points before backup Mitchell Trubisky was substituted on in the fourth quarter. The Bills defense limited the Texans' rookie quarterback Davis Mills, filling in for former Bills starter Tyrod Taylor, to just 87 passing yards and intercepted him four times. The Texans finished with just 109 total offensive yards. With the 40–0 victory, their second shutout win of the season, the Bills improved to 3–1.

==== Week 5: at Kansas City Chiefs ====
Week 5: Buffalo Bills at Kansas City Chiefs – Game summary

Quarter	1	2	3	4	Total
**Bills**	7	17	7	7	**38**
Chiefs	3	10	0	7	**20**

at Arrowhead Stadium, Kansas City, Missouri

- Date: October 10
- Game time: 8:20 p.m. EDT/7:20 p.m. CDT
- Game weather: 71 °F (22 °C)
- Game attendance: 73,389
- Referee: Carl Cheffers
- TV announcers (NBC): Al Michaels, Cris Collinsworth and Michele Tafoya
- Recap, Game Book

Game information

**First quarter**

- KC – Harrison Butker 38-yard field goal, 8:31. Chiefs 3–0. **Drive: 17 plays, 56 yards, 6:29.**
- BUF – Josh Allen 9-yard run (Tyler Bass kick), 4:36. Bills 7–3. **Drive: 8 plays, 75 yards, 3:55.**

**Second quarter**

- KC – Byron Pringle 5-yard pass from Patrick Mahomes (Harrison Butker kick), 10:00. Chiefs 10–7. **Drive: 12 plays, 80 yards, 7:55.**
- BUF – Emmanuel Sanders 35-yard pass from Josh Allen (Tyler Bass kick), 7:45. Bills 14–10. **Drive: 5 plays, 75 yards, 2:15.**
- BUF – Tyler Bass 30-yard field goal, 3:13. Bills 17–10. **Drive: 7 plays, 62 yards, 2:33.**
- BUF – Dawson Knox 53-yard pass from Josh Allen (Tyler Bass kick), 1:16. Bills 24–10. **Drive: 2 plays, 68 yards, 0:34.**
- KC – Harrison Butker 54-yard field goal, 0:02. Bills 24–13. **Drive: 8 plays, 39 yards, 1:14.**

**Third quarter**

- BUF – Micah Hyde 26-yard interception return (Tyler Bass kick), 7:12. Bills 31–13.

**Fourth quarter**

- KC – Travis Kelce 1-yard pass from Patrick Mahomes (Harrison Butker kick), 13:42. Bills 31–20. **Drive: 7 plays, 52 yards, 2:32.**
- BUF – Emmanuel Sanders 8-yard pass from Josh Allen (Tyler Bass kick), 5:51. Bills 38–20. **Drive: 12 plays, 85 yards, 7:51.**

**Top passers**

- BUF – Josh Allen – 15/26, 315 yards, 3 TD
- KC – Patrick Mahomes – 33/54, 272 yards, 2 TD, 2 INT

**Top rushers**

- BUF – Josh Allen – 11 rushes, 59 yards, TD
- KC – Patrick Mahomes – 8 rushes, 61 yards

**Top receivers**

- BUF – Dawson Knox – 3 receptions, 117 yards, TD
- KC – Mecole Hardman – 9 receptions, 76 yards

The Bills returned to Arrowhead Stadium for a Sunday night rematch of the previous season's AFC Championship game looking to avenge a 38–24 loss; in that same season, the Bills had also lost in the regular season to Kansas City. In a game nationally anticipated as a potential bellwether for AFC contention, the Bills scored 38 points, and they were dominant on both sides of the ball throughout the game. While Allen earned a 139.1 passer rating and threw for 315 yards (averaging 21 yards per pass completion), the Bills defense sacked Patrick Mahomes twice and forced him into three turnovers, with one being returned for a touchdown. The game was affected greatly by weather conditions, as a rain delay extended halftime by over an hour, and by numerous penalties, as the two teams combined for 158 penalty yards.

This was Buffalo's first win over Kansas City since 2017 and their first win with Mahomes as the Chiefs' starting quarterback. The win improved the Bills to 4–1.

==== Week 6: at Tennessee Titans ====
Week 6: Buffalo Bills at Tennessee Titans – Game summary

Quarter	1	2	3	4	Total
Bills	3	17	11	0	**31**
**Titans**	0	17	7	10	**34**

at Nissan Stadium, Nashville, Tennessee

- Date: October 18
- Game time: 8:15 p.m. EDT/7:15 p.m. CDT
- Game weather: Clear, 65 °F (18 °C)
- Game attendance: 69,419
- Referee: Clete Blakeman
- TV announcers (ESPN): Steve Levy, Brian Griese, Louis Riddick and Lisa Salters
- Recap, Game Book

Game information

**First quarter**

- BUF – Tyler Bass 24-yard field goal, 6:07. Bills 3–0. **Drive: 13 plays, 74 yards, 6:19.**

**Second quarter**

- BUF – Tyler Bass 28-yard field goal, 11:36. Bills 6–0. **Drive: 10 plays, 38 yards, 4:27.**
- TEN – Derrick Henry 76-yard run (Randy Bullock kick), 11:20. Titans 7–6. **Drive: 1 play, 76 yards, 0:16.**
- BUF – Stefon Diggs 14-yard pass from Josh Allen (Tyler Bass kick), 7:54. Bills 13–7. **Drive: 7 plays, 72 yards, 3:26.**
- TEN – Randy Bullock 43-yard field goal, 5:04. Bills 13–10. **Drive: 7 plays, 54 yards, 2:50.**
- TEN – Ryan Tannehill 4-yard run (Randy Bullock kick), 4:23. Titans 17–13. **Drive: 2 plays, 11 yards, 0:31.**
- BUF – Cole Beasley 29-yard pass from Josh Allen (Tyler Bass kick), 0:40. Bills 20–17. **Drive: 10 plays, 75 yards, 3:43.**

**Third quarter**

- BUF – Tyler Bass 52-yard field goal, 10:49. Bills 23–17. **Drive: 9 plays, 48 yards, 4:11.**
- TEN – Derrick Henry 3-yard run (Randy Bullock kick), 4:23. Titans 24–23. **Drive: 12 plays, 67 yards, 6:26.**
- BUF – Tommy Sweeney 1-yard pass from Josh Allen (Dawson Knox-Josh Allen pass, rip-off of the Philly Special), 0:27. Bills 31–24. **Drive: 9 plays, 75 yards, 3:56.**

**Fourth quarter**

- TEN – Randy Bullock 38-yard field goal, 9:45. Bills 31–27. **Drive: 9 plays, 45 yards, 5:42.**
- TEN – Derrick Henry 13-yard run (Randy Bullock kick), 3:05. Titans 34–31. **Drive: 8 plays, 70 yards, 4:56.**

**Top passers**

- BUF – Josh Allen – 35/47, 353 yards, 3 TD, INT
- TEN – Ryan Tannehill – 18/29, 216 yards, INT

**Top rushers**

- BUF – Devin Singletary – 5 rushes, 27 yards
- TEN – Derrick Henry – 20 rushes, 143 yards, 3 TD

**Top receivers**

- BUF – Emmanuel Sanders – 5 receptions, 91 yards
- TEN – A. J. Brown – 7 receptions, 91 yards

The Bills attempted to avenge a 42–16 loss to the Titans from the previous season, which was rescheduled several times due to a COVID-19 outbreak in the Titans organization. In the final moments of a back-and-forth shootout on Monday Night Football, in which the lead changed seven times, the Titans defensive line stopped Josh Allen on a fourth-down quarterback sneak at the Tennessee 3-yard line, and Buffalo narrowly lost 34–31, falling to 4–2 ahead of its bye week.

==== Week 8: vs. Miami Dolphins ====
Week 8: Miami Dolphins at Buffalo Bills – Game summary

Quarter	1	2	3	4	Total
Dolphins	0	3	0	8	**11**
**Bills**	3	0	7	16	**26**

at Highmark Stadium, Orchard Park, New York

- Date: October 31
- Game time: 1:00 p.m. EDT
- Game weather: Cloudy, 51 °F (11 °C)
- Game attendance: 69,355
- Referee: Shawn Smith
- TV announcers (CBS): Andrew Catalon, James Lofton and Sherree Burruss
- Recap, Game Book

Game information

**First quarter**

- BUF – Tyler Bass 57-yard field goal, 3:48. Bills 3–0. **Drive: 7 plays, 35 yards, 4:18.**

**Second quarter**

- MIA – Jason Sanders 51-yard field goal, 8:10. Tied 3–3. **Drive: 7 plays, 32 yards, 3:51.**

**Third quarter**

- BUF – Gabe Davis 8-yard pass from Josh Allen (Tyler Bass kick), 3:49. Bills 10–3. **Drive: 13 plays, 80 yards, 7:06.**

**Fourth quarter**

- BUF – Stefon Diggs 19-yard pass from Josh Allen (Tyler Bass kick), 13:23. Bills 17–3. **Drive: 9 plays, 69 yards, 3:49.**
- MIA – Tua Tagovailoa 1-yard run (Tua Tagovailoa–Mike Gesicki pass), 9:39. Bills 17–11. **Drive: 11 plays, 75 yards, 3:44.**
- BUF – Tyler Bass 39-yard field goal, 3:33. Bills 20–11. **Drive: 14 plays, 59 yards, 6:10.**
- BUF – Josh Allen 7-yard run (run failed), 1:07. Bills 26–11. **Drive: 3 plays, 11 yards, 1:14.**

**Top passers**

- MIA – Tua Tagovailoa – 21/39, 205 yards, INT
- BUF – Josh Allen – 29/42, 249 yards, 2 TD

**Top rushers**

- MIA – Myles Gaskin – 12 rushes, 36 yards
- BUF – Josh Allen – 8 rushes, 55 yards, TD

**Top receivers**

- MIA – DeVante Parker – 8 receptions, 85 yards
- BUF – Cole Beasley – 10 receptions, 110 yards

The Dolphins, who entered the game at 1–6, dominated the time of possession in the first half and limited Buffalo's offense to a field goal; however, they also squandered two scoring opportunities in the red zone, culminating in a 3–3 tie at halftime. The Bills would score two unanswered touchdowns to Gabe Davis and Stefon Diggs after halftime en route to a 26–11 win, their seventh straight over Miami.

==== Week 9: at Jacksonville Jaguars ====
Week 9: Buffalo Bills at Jacksonville Jaguars – Game summary

Quarter	1	2	3	4	Total
Bills	3	3	0	0	**6**
**Jaguars**	3	3	0	3	**9**

at TIAA Bank Field, Jacksonville, Florida

- Date: November 7
- Game time: 1:00 p.m. EST
- Game weather: Cloudy, 58 °F (14 °C)
- Game attendance: 63,110
- Referee: Land Clark
- TV announcers (CBS): Andrew Catalon, James Lofton and Jenny Dell
- Recap, Game Book

Game information

**First quarter**

- JAX – Matthew Wright 39-yard field goal, 8:57. Jaguars 3–0. **Drive: 12 plays, 54 yards, 6:03.**
- BUF – Tyler Bass 24-yard field goal, 3:54. Tied 3–3. **Drive: 12 plays, 48 yards, 5:03.**

**Second quarter**

- BUF – Tyler Bass 41-yard field goal, 10:59. Bills 6–3. **Drive: 12 plays, 48 yards, 6:24.**
- JAX – Matthew Wright 55-yard field goal, 5:30. Tied 6–6. **Drive: 10 plays, 38 yards, 5:29.**

**Third quarter**

- No scoring plays.

**Fourth quarter**

- JAX – Matthew Wright 21-yard field goal, 12:10. Jaguars 9–6. **Drive: 10 plays, 27 yards, 4:45.**

**Top passers**

- BUF – Josh Allen – 31/47, 264 yards, 2 INT
- JAX – Trevor Lawrence – 15/26, 118 yards

**Top rushers**

- BUF – Josh Allen – 5 rushes, 50 yards
- JAX – Carlos Hyde – 21 rushes, 67 yards

**Top receivers**

- BUF – Stefon Diggs – 6 receptions, 85 yards
- JAX – Dan Arnold – 4 receptions, 60 yards

The Bills entered this game as 14.5-point favorites over the 1–6 Jacksonville Jaguars. Nevertheless, the game was a defensive struggle, with neither team finding the end zone. Despite outgaining Jacksonville by 83 yards, the Bills lost the turnover battle 1–3, with all of their turnovers coming from quarterback Josh Allen (two interceptions and a lost fumble). Allen was sacked four times for 35 yards, and Buffalo was penalized 12 times for 118 yards. After allowing field goals on each of their first two drives, the Jaguars defense had their way with the Bills offensive line, which was missing Jon Feliciano and Spencer Brown due to injury. Notably, Josh Allen's namesake on the Jaguars sacked, intercepted, and recovered a fumble from his Bills counterpart, marking the first time in NFL history where a defensive player had done all of this to a quarterback with the same name. Jacksonville pulled off one of the biggest upsets of the season, defeating Buffalo 9–6 and winning their first game in North America since Week 1 of the 2020 season. With the stunning loss, Buffalo fell to 5–3, with their division lead over the New England Patriots shrinking to just half a game.

==== Week 10: at New York Jets ====
Week 10: Buffalo Bills at New York Jets – Game summary

Quarter	1	2	3	4	Total
**Bills**	10	7	21	7	**45**
Jets	0	3	0	14	**17**

at MetLife Stadium, East Rutherford, New Jersey

- Date: November 14
- Game time: 1:00 p.m. EST
- Game weather: Overcast and brisk, 48 °F (9 °C)
- Game attendance: 77,625
- Referee: Scott Novak
- TV announcers (CBS): Spero Dedes and Jay Feely
- Recap, Game Book

Game information

**First quarter**

- BUF – Matt Breida 15-yard pass from Josh Allen (Tyler Bass kick), 12:15. Bills 7–0. **Drive: 5 plays, 58 yards, 1:55.**
- BUF – Tyler Bass 29-yard field goal, 5:22. Bills 10–0. **Drive: 9 plays, 33 yards, 3:55.**

**Second quarter**

- NYJ – Matt Ammendola 48-yard field goal, 1:53. Bills 10–3. **Drive: 8 plays, 47 yards, 3:33.**
- BUF – Stefon Diggs 12-yard pass from Josh Allen (Tyler Bass kick), 0:53. Bills 17–3. **Drive: 5 plays, 75 yards, 1:00.**

**Third quarter**

- BUF – Isaiah McKenzie 8-yard run (Tyler Bass kick), 12:01. Bills 24–3. **Drive: 5 plays, 75 yards, 2:59.**
- BUF – Matt Breida 15-yard run (Tyler Bass kick), 10:47. Bills 31–3. **Drive: 2 plays, 64 yards, 1:00.**
- BUF – Zack Moss 1-yard run (Tyler Bass kick), 6:01. Bills 38–3. **Drive: 4 plays, 45 yards, 2:18.**

**Fourth quarter**

- NYJ – Michael Carter 1-yard run (Matt Ammendola kick), 11:58. Bills 38–10. **Drive: 11 plays, 35 yards, 3:34.**
- BUF – Devin Singletary 2-yard run (Tyler Bass kick), 5:52. Bills 45–10. **Drive: 4 plays, 57 yards, 2:18.**
- NYJ – Elijah Moore 15-yard pass from Joe Flacco (Matt Ammendola kick), 2:08. Bills 45–17. **Drive: 8 plays, 68 yards, 3:44.**

**Top passers**

- BUF – Josh Allen – 21/28, 366 yards, 2 TD, INT
- NYJ – Mike White – 24/44, 251 yards, 4 INT

**Top rushers**

- BUF – Devin Singletary – 7 rushes, 43 yards, TD
- NYJ – Michael Carter – 16 rushes, 39 yards, TD

**Top receivers**

- BUF – Stefon Diggs – 8 receptions, 162 yards, TD
- NYJ – Corey Davis – 5 receptions, 93 yards

Buffalo rebounded against the divisional rival New York Jets, scoring six touchdowns after being held out of the endzone the week prior, with two of those touchdowns accounted for by third string running back Matt Breida. On defense, all five starting defensive backs for the Bills, namely Taron Johnson, Micah Hyde, Tre'Davious White, Levi Wallace, and Jordan Poyer, recorded a turnover off the Jets' offense, stifling quarterback Mike White. With the 45–17 win, Buffalo improved to 6–3.

==== Week 11: vs. Indianapolis Colts ====
Week 11: Indianapolis Colts at Buffalo Bills – Game summary

Quarter	1	2	3	4	Total
**Colts**	14	10	14	3	**41**
Bills	0	7	0	8	**15**

at Highmark Stadium, Orchard Park, New York

- Date: November 21
- Game time: 1:00 p.m. EST
- Game weather: Cloudy, 49 °F (9 °C)
- Game attendance: 69,866
- Referee: Brad Rogers
- TV announcers (CBS): Kevin Harlan, Trent Green, and Melanie Collins
- Recap, GameBook

Game information

**First quarter**

- IND – Jonathan Taylor 3-yard run (Michael Badgley kick), 8:55. Colts 7–0. **Drive: 11 plays, 65 yards, 6:05.**
- IND – Jonathan Taylor 23-yard pass from Carson Wentz (Michael Badgley kick), 1:38. Colts 14–0. **Drive: 5 plays, 57 yards, 2:20.**

**Second quarter**

- BUF – Stefon Diggs 6-yard pass from Josh Allen (Tyler Bass kick), 10:44. Colts 14–7. **Drive: 11 plays, 73 yards, 5:54.**
- IND – Michael Badgley 36-yard field goal, 2:12. Colts 17–7. **Drive: 15 plays, 58 yards, 8:32.**
- IND – Jonathan Taylor 2-yard run (Michael Badgley kick), 1:59. Colts 24–7. **Drive: 1 play, 2 yards, 0:04.**

**Third quarter**

- IND – Jonathan Taylor 10-yard run (Michael Badgley kick), 5:27. Colts 31–7. **Drive: 5 plays, 61 yards, 2:46.**
- IND – Jonathan Taylor 1-yard run (Michael Badgley kick), 0:58. Colts 38–7. **Drive: 6 plays, 24 yards, 3:31.**

**Fourth quarter**

- BUF – Stefon Diggs 9-yard pass from Josh Allen (Josh Allen run), 12:42. Colts 38–15. **Drive: 10 plays, 77 yards, 3:16.**
- IND – Michael Badgley 35-yard field goal, 6:23. Colts 41–15. **Drive: 10 plays, 63 yards, 6:19.**

**Top passers**

- IND – Carson Wentz – 11/20, 106 yards, TD
- BUF – Josh Allen – 21/35, 209 yards, 2 TD, 2 INT

**Top rushers**

- IND – Jonathan Taylor – 32 rushes, 185 yards, 4 TD
- BUF – Matt Breida – 5 rushes, 51 yards

**Top receivers**

- IND – Jack Doyle – 3 receptions, 30 yards
- BUF – Dawson Knox – 6 receptions, 80 yards

The Bills defense, missing key run-stoppers Star Lotulelei and Tremaine Edmunds, struggled to contain Colts RB Jonathan Taylor, who scored five total touchdowns from scrimmage. To make matters worse, the Buffalo offense and special teams unit committed key turnovers, contributing to a 41–15 blowout loss. Buffalo fell to 6–4, also falling to second place in the AFC East as the Patriots had won earlier that week. This was the first NFL game to ever end in the score of 15–41, a scorigami.

==== Week 12: at New Orleans Saints ====
Thanksgiving Day games

Week 12: Buffalo Bills at New Orleans Saints – Game summary

Quarter	1	2	3	4	Total
**Bills**	7	3	14	7	**31**
Saints	0	0	0	6	**6**

at Caesars Superdome, New Orleans, Louisiana

- Date: November 25
- Game time: 8:20 p.m. EST/7:20 p.m. CST
- Game weather: None (indoor stadium)
- Game attendance: 69,170
- Referee: Brad Allen
- TV announcers (NBC): Mike Tirico, Drew Brees and Michele Tafoya
- Recap, Game Book

Game information

**First quarter**

- BUF – Dawson Knox 7-yard pass from Josh Allen (Tyler Bass kick), 7:09. Bills 7–0. **Drive: 10 plays, 65 yards, 5:54.**

**Second quarter**

- BUF – Tyler Bass 34-yard field goal, 8:46. Bills 10–0. **Drive: 7 plays, 38 yards, 4:00.**

**Third quarter**

- BUF – Stefon Diggs 5-yard pass from Josh Allen (Tyler Bass kick), 8:48. Bills 17–0. **Drive: 11 plays, 75 yards, 6:12.**
- BUF – Dawson Knox 24-yard pass from Josh Allen (Tyler Bass kick), 4:19. Bills 24–0. **Drive: 5 plays, 53 yards, 2:51.**

**Fourth quarter**

- NO – Nick Vannett 11-yard pass from Trevor Siemian (pass failed), 14:54. Bills 24–6. **Drive: 10 plays, 75 yards, 4:25.**
- BUF – Matt Breida 23-yard pass from Josh Allen (Tyler Bass kick), 8:17. Bills 31–6. **Drive: 4 plays, 51 yards, 2:25.**

**Top passers**

- BUF – Josh Allen – 23/28, 260 yards, 4 TD, 2 INT
- NO – Trevor Siemian – 17/29, 163 yards, TD, INT

**Top rushers**

- BUF – Devin Singletary – 15 rushes, 44 yards
- NO – Tony Jones Jr. – 16 rushes, 27 yards

**Top receivers**

- BUF – Stefon Diggs – 7 receptions, 74 yards, TD
- NO – Lil'Jordan Humphrey – 3 receptions, 47 yards

In their second Thanksgiving Day game in three years, the Bills traveled south to play the injury-depleted Saints. Josh Allen continued to struggle with interceptions, throwing two in the second quarter, but also threw four touchdown passes, including two to Dawson Knox, as Buffalo routed New Orleans 31–6 to improve to 7–4. They also lost Tre'Davious White for the season to a torn ACL suffered during the game.

==== Week 13: vs. New England Patriots ====
Week 13: New England Patriots at Buffalo Bills – Game summary

Quarter	1	2	3	4	Total
**Patriots**	8	3	0	3	**14**
Bills	7	0	3	0	**10**

at Highmark Stadium, Orchard Park, New York

- Date: December 6
- Game time: 8:15 p.m. EST
- Game weather: Cloudy, Windy, 36 °F (2 °C)
- Game attendance: 69,694
- Referee: Bill Vinovich
- TV announcers (ESPN): Steve Levy, Brian Griese, Louis Riddick and Lisa Salters
- Recap, Game Book

Game information

**First quarter**

- NE – Damien Harris 64-yard run (Brandon Bolden run), 5:18. Patriots 8–0. **Drive: 3 plays, 69 yards, 1:37.**
- BUF – Gabe Davis 14-yard pass from Josh Allen (Tyler Bass kick), 2:02. Patriots 8–7. **Drive: 1 play, 14 yards, 0:05.**

**Second quarter**

- NE – Nick Folk 41-yard field goal, 11:28. Patriots 11–7. **Drive: 9 plays, 52 yards, 5:34.**

**Third quarter**

- BUF – Tyler Bass 35-yard field goal, 6:35. Patriots 11–10. **Drive: 8 plays, 46 yards, 2:40.**

**Fourth quarter**

- NE – Nick Folk 34-yard field goal, 13:01. Patriots 14–10. **Drive: 14 plays, 59 yards, 8:34.**

**Top passers**

- NE – Mac Jones – 2/3, 19 yards
- BUF – Josh Allen – 15/30, 145 yards, TD

**Top rushers**

- NE – Damien Harris – 10 rushes, 111 yards, TD
- BUF – Josh Allen – 6 rushes, 39 yards

**Top receivers**

- NE – Jonnu Smith – 1 reception, 12 yards
- BUF – Stefon Diggs – 4 receptions, 51 yards

In a game affected by winds greater than 40 miles per hour, divisional rival New England ran the ball 46 times and only threw three passes, accumulating over 200 rushing yards and just 19 passing yards. The Bills also tried a run-heavy approach but relied more on the passing game late in the game despite the heavy winds affecting several of Josh Allen's passes. New England never trailed after taking the early lead with a 64-yard rushing touchdown by Damien Harris, and Buffalo finished just 1 for 4 on redzone possessions, leading to a 14–10 loss to the Patriots.

==== Week 14: at Tampa Bay Buccaneers ====
Week 14: Buffalo Bills at Tampa Bay Buccaneers – Game summary

Quarter	1	2	3	4	OT	Total
Bills	0	3	7	17	0	**27**
**Buccaneers**	7	17	0	3	6	**33**

at Raymond James Stadium, Tampa, Florida

- Date: December 12
- Game time: 4:25 p.m. EST
- Game weather: Cloudy, 81 °F (27 °C)
- Game attendance: 65,655
- Referee: Scott Novak
- TV announcers (CBS): Jim Nantz, Tony Romo and Tracy Wolfson
- Recap, Game Book

Game information

**First quarter**

- TB – Leonard Fournette 47-yard run (Ryan Succop kick), 8:13. Buccaneers 7–0. **Drive: 5 plays, 67 yards, 1:42.**

**Second quarter**

- TB – Ryan Succop 23-yard field goal, 13:36. Buccaneers 10–0. **Drive: 15 plays, 80 yards, 6:43.**
- BUF – Tyler Bass 21-yard field goal, 9:28. Buccaneers 10–3. **Drive: 7 plays, 72 yards, 4:08.**
- TB – Mike Evans 13-yard pass from Tom Brady (Ryan Succop kick), 7:11. Buccaneers 17–3. **Drive: 7 plays, 75 yards, 2:17.**
- TB – Tom Brady 1-yard run (Ryan Succop kick), 1:29. Buccaneers 24–3. **Drive: 10 plays, 72 yards, 2:43.**

**Third quarter**

- BUF – Josh Allen 18-yard run (Tyler Bass kick), 7:29. Buccaneers 24–10. **Drive: 9 plays, 81 yards, 3:40.**

**Fourth quarter**

- TB – Ryan Succop 24-yard field goal, 11:20. Buccaneers 27–10. **Drive: 11 plays, 84 yards, 5:51.**
- BUF – Dawson Knox 15-yard pass from Josh Allen (Tyler Bass kick), 9:07. Buccaneers 27–17. **Drive: 5 plays, 75 yards, 2:13.**
- BUF – Gabe Davis 4-yard pass from Josh Allen (Tyler Bass kick), 4:53. Buccaneers 27–24. **Drive: 9 plays, 46 yards, 3:15.**
- BUF – Tyler Bass 25-yard field goal, 0:22. Tied 27–27. **Drive: 14 plays, 70 yards, 2:43.**

**Overtime**

- TB – Breshad Perriman 58-yard pass from Tom Brady, 5:31. Buccaneers 33–27. **Drive: 6 plays, 94 yards, 3:17**

**Top passers**

- BUF – Josh Allen – 36/54, 308 yards, 2 TD, INT
- TB – Tom Brady – 31/46, 363 yards, 2 TD

**Top rushers**

- BUF – Josh Allen – 12 rushes, 109 yards, TD
- TB – Leonard Fournette – 19 rushes, 113 yards, TD

**Top receivers**

- BUF – Stefon Diggs – 7 receptions, 74 yards
- TB – Chris Godwin – 10 receptions, 105 yards

The Buccaneers raced to a 24–3 halftime lead under former Patriots quarterback Tom Brady, along with a strong first-half performance by running back Leonard Fournette and a furious pass rush that largely shut down Josh Allen and the Bills' offense, which did not hand off the ball to a running back in the first half, the first time an NFL team had not done so since 1991. However, the Bills mounted a comeback, outscoring Tampa Bay 24–3 in the second half, to force overtime. After a three and out on the first series of the extra period, a 63-yard punt from Matt Haack pushed Tampa Bay to its own 6-yard line. A controversial pass interference call on Levi Wallace allowed Tampa Bay to convert a 3rd-and-long, and the Buccaneers sealed the game minutes later with a 58-yard catch-and-run touchdown pass from Brady to Breshad Perriman, sending Buffalo to a 7–6 record with the loss. Allen became just the fourth quarterback in NFL history with 300 passing yards and 100 rushing yards in the same game, playing through a sprained ankle suffered in the fourth quarter.

==== Week 15: vs. Carolina Panthers ====
Week 15: Carolina Panthers at Buffalo Bills – Game summary

Quarter	1	2	3	4	Total
Panthers	0	8	0	6	**14**
**Bills**	0	17	7	7	**31**

at Highmark Stadium, Orchard Park, New York

- Date: December 19
- Game time: 1:00 p.m. EST
- Game weather: Cloudy, 29 °F (−2 °C)
- Game attendance: 65,398
- Referee: Clete Blakeman
- TV announcers (Fox): Kenny Albert, Jonathan Vilma, and Lindsay Czarniak
- Recap, Game Book

Game information

**First quarter**

- No scoring plays

**Second quarter**

- BUF – Devin Singletary 16-yard run (Tyler Bass kick), 14:13. Bills 7–0. **Drive: 6 plays, 50 yards, 2:48.**
- BUF – Stefon Diggs 11-yard pass from Josh Allen (Tyler Bass kick), 9:41. Bills 14–0. **Drive: 5 plays, 57 yards, 2:36.**
- CAR – Cam Newton 4-yard run (Cam Newton–D. J. Moore pass), 1:48. Bills 14–8. **Drive: 3 plays, 37 yards, 0:57.**
- BUF – Tyler Bass 26-yard field goal, 0:00. Bills 17–8. **Drive: 11 plays, 63 yards, 1:48.**

**Third quarter**

- BUF – Gabe Davis 20-yard pass from Josh Allen (Tyler Bass kick), 5:52. Bills 24–8. **Drive: 10 plays, 74 yards, 3:42.**

**Fourth quarter**

- CAR – Ameer Abdullah 23-yard pass from Cam Newton (run failed), 11:01. Bills 24–14. **Drive: 4 plays, 43 yards, 1:22.**
- BUF – Gabe Davis 14-yard pass from Josh Allen (Tyler Bass kick), 2:07. Bills 31–14. **Drive: 9 plays, 46 yards, 4:04.**

**Top passers**

- CAR – Cam Newton – 18/38, 156 yards, TD, INT
- BUF – Josh Allen – 19/34, 210 yards, 3 TD, INT

**Top rushers**

- CAR – Cam Newton – 15 rushes, 71 yards, TD
- BUF – Devin Singletary – 22 rushes, 86 yards, TD

**Top receivers**

- CAR – D. J. Moore – 6 receptions, 48 yards
- BUF – Gabe Davis – 5 receptions, 85 yards, 2 TD

With the win, Buffalo snapped a two-game losing streak and improved to 8–6.

==== Week 16: at New England Patriots ====
Week 16: Buffalo Bills at New England Patriots – Game summary

Quarter	1	2	3	4	Total
**Bills**	7	10	3	13	**33**
Patriots	0	7	7	7	**21**

at Gillette Stadium, Foxborough, Massachusetts

- Date: December 26
- Game time: 1:00 p.m. EST
- Game weather: Cloudy, 37 °F (3 °C)
- Game attendance: 65,878
- Referee: Shawn Smith
- TV announcers (CBS): Ian Eagle, Charles Davis, and Evan Washburn
- Recap, Game Book

Game information

**First quarter**

- BUF – Isaiah McKenzie 3-yard pass from Josh Allen (Tyler Bass kick), 6:37. Bills 7–0. **Drive: 13 plays, 61 yards, 6:57.**

**Second quarter**

- NE – Damien Harris 16-yard run (Nick Folk kick), 14:28. Tied 7–7. **Drive: 13 plays, 75 yards, 7:09.**
- BUF – Tyler Bass 25-yard field goal, 9:01. Bills 10–7. **Drive: 10 plays, 68 yards, 5:27.**
- BUF – Stefon Diggs 12-yard pass from Josh Allen (Tyler Bass kick), 1:45. Bills 17–7. **Drive: 7 plays, 42 yards, 1:25.**

**Third quarter**

- BUF – Tyler Bass 34-yard field goal, 9:02. Bills 20–7. **Drive: 14 plays, 64 yards, 5:58.**
- NE – Damien Harris 1-yard run (Nick Folk kick), 1:41. Bills 20–14. **Drive: 14 plays, 75 yards, 7:21.**

**Fourth quarter**

- BUF – Devin Singletary 2-yard run (pass failed), 11:42. Bills 26–14. **Drive: 9 plays, 66 yards, 4:59.**
- NE – Damien Harris 8-yard run (Nick Folk kick), 7:37. Bills 26–21. **Drive: 10 plays, 75 yards, 4:05.**
- BUF – Dawson Knox 2-yard pass from Josh Allen (Tyler Bass kick), 2:30. Bills 33–21. **Drive: 13 plays, 75 yards, 5:07.**

**Top passers**

- NE – Mac Jones – 14/32, 145 yards, 2 INT
- BUF – Josh Allen – 30/47, 314 yards, 3 TD

**Top rushers**

- NE – Damien Harris – 18 rushes, 103 yards, 3 TD
- BUF – Josh Allen – 12 rushes, 64 yards

**Top receivers**

- NE – Jakobi Meyers – 6 receptions, 59 yards
- BUF – Isaiah McKenzie – 11 receptions, 125 yards, TD

Buffalo avenged its Monday Night loss to the Patriots earlier in December, as Josh Allen passed for over 300 yards and 3 touchdowns and was not sacked during the game. Despite receivers Cole Beasley and Gabe Davis coming down with COVID-19 and missing the game, utility player Isaiah McKenzie had a dominant performance in Beasley's place. New England relied heavily on its run game again, with Damien Harris scoring 3 touchdowns, but was forced to pass more with rookie quarterback Mac Jones, who completed less than 50 percent of his throws and was intercepted twice by Micah Hyde. With the 33–21 win, Buffalo improved to 9–6 and retook the division lead from New England.

==== Week 17: vs. Atlanta Falcons ====
Week 17: Atlanta Falcons at Buffalo Bills – Game summary

Quarter	1	2	3	4	Total
Falcons	2	13	0	0	**15**
**Bills**	14	0	8	7	**29**

at Highmark Stadium, Orchard Park, New York

- Date: January 2
- Game time: 1:00 p.m. EST
- Game weather: Snow showers, 25 °F (−4 °C)
- Game attendance: 64,948
- Referee: Land Clark
- TV announcers (Fox): Kevin Kugler, Mark Sanchez and Laura Okmin
- Recap, Game Book

Game information

**First quarter**

- ATL – Jake Kumerow tackled in end zone for a safety, 11:04. Falcons 2–0.
- BUF – Josh Allen 1-yard run (Tyler Bass kick), 3:15. Bills 7–2. **Drive: 15 plays, 69 yards, 6:10.**
- BUF – Josh Allen 4-yard run (Tyler Bass kick), 0:35. Bills 14–2. **Drive: 6 plays, 18 yards, 1:52.**

**Second quarter**

- ATL – Younghoe Koo 28-yard field goal, 10:08. Bills 14–5. **Drive: 10 plays, 65 yards, 5:27.**
- ATL – Mike Davis 1-yard run (Younghoe Koo kick), 1:48. Bills 14–12. **Drive: 5 plays, 80 yards, 1:32.**
- ATL – Younghoe Koo 24-yard field goal, 0:00. Falcons 15–14. **Drive: 7 plays, 50 yards, 1:06.**

**Third quarter**

- BUF – Devin Singletary 6-yard run (Josh Allen–Cole Beasley pass), 5:56. Bills 22–15. **Drive: 11 plays, 80 yards, 6:36.**

**Fourth quarter**

- BUF – Devin Singletary 4-yard run (Tyler Bass kick), 10:46. Bills 29–15. **Drive: 12 plays, 65 yards, 7:18.**

**Top passers**

- ATL – Matt Ryan – 13/23, 197 yards
- BUF – Josh Allen – 11/26, 120 yards, 3 INT

**Top rushers**

- ATL – Mike Davis – 8 rushes, 42 yards, TD
- BUF – Devin Singletary – 23 rushes, 110 yards, 2 TD

**Top receivers**

- ATL – Kyle Pitts – 2 receptions, 69 yards
- BUF – Stefon Diggs – 5 receptions, 52 yards

Despite Allen turning in one of the worst passing performances of his career, he and running back Devin Singletary combined for four rushing touchdowns as Buffalo overcame 3 turnovers and a Falcons lead at halftime to win 29–15, clinching a playoff berth for the fourth time in five years.

==== Week 18: vs. New York Jets ====
Week 18: New York Jets at Buffalo Bills – Game summary

Quarter	1	2	3	4	Total
Jets	0	7	3	0	**10**
**Bills**	10	3	0	14	**27**

at Highmark Stadium, Orchard Park, New York

- Date: January 9
- Game time: 4:25 p.m. EST
- Game weather: Snow showers, 34 °F (1 °C)
- Game attendance: 64,783
- Referee: John Hussey
- TV announcers (CBS): Kevin Harlan, Trent Green, and Melanie Collins
- Recap, Game Book

Game information

**First quarter**

- BUF – Stefon Diggs 10-yard pass from Josh Allen (Tyler Bass kick), 10:42. Bills 7–0. **Drive: 7 plays, 75 yards, 4:18.**
- BUF – Tyler Bass 41-yard field goal, 2:31. Bills 10–0. **Drive: 13 plays, 70 yards, 6:29.**

**Second quarter**

- NYJ – Keelan Cole 40-yard pass from Zach Wilson (Eddy Piñeiro kick), 3:51. Bills 10–7. **Drive: 4 plays, 45 yards, 1:31.**
- BUF – Tyler Bass 21-yard field goal, 0:00. Bills 13–7. **Drive: 10 plays, 81 yards, 1:39.**

**Third quarter**

- NYJ – Eddy Piñeiro 49-yard field goal, 3:55. Bills 13–10. **Drive: 4 plays, −9 yards, 1:31.**

**Fourth quarter**

- BUF – Devin Singletary 1-yard run (Tyler Bass kick), 8:21. Bills 20–10. **Drive: 7 plays, 51 yards, 4:12.**
- BUF – Devin Singletary 5-yard pass from Josh Allen (Tyler Bass kick), 3:53. Bills 27–10. **Drive: 7 plays, 48 yards, 3:31.**

**Top passers**

- NYJ – Zach Wilson – 7/20, 87 yards, TD
- BUF – Josh Allen – 24/45, 239 yards, 2 TD

**Top rushers**

- NYJ – Zach Wilson – 2 rushes, 24 yards
- BUF – Devin Singletary – 19 rushes, 88 yards, TD

**Top receivers**

- NYJ – Keelan Cole – 3 receptions, 54 yards, TD
- BUF – Stefon Diggs – 9 receptions, 81 yards, TD

The Bills held the lead the whole way during the game, holding the Jets offense to just 53 total yards on offense and recording nine quarterback sacks en route to a 27–10 win, which assured them the division title. Had they lost, they would have needed the Patriots to lose to Miami to clinch the division. A New England loss, combined with a subsequent victory by the Las Vegas Raiders late that night, sealed the 3rd seed for the Bills, and the Patriots as their opponent for the Wild Card game.

=== Standings ===
==== Division ====
AFC East
	W	L	T	PCT	DIV	CONF	PF	PA	STK
^{(3)} Buffalo Bills	11	6	0	.647	5–1	7–5	483	289	W4
^{(6)} New England Patriots	10	7	0	.588	3–3	8–4	462	303	L1
Miami Dolphins	9	8	0	.529	4–2	6–6	341	373	W1
New York Jets	4	13	0	.235	0–6	4–8	310	504	L2

==== Conference ====
AFC
#	Team	Division	W	L	T	PCT	DIV	CONF	SOS	SOV	STK
**Division winners**
1 (Note: Tennessee finished ahead of Kansas City based on head-to-head victory, claiming the No. 1 seed.)	Tennessee Titans	South	12	5	0	.706	5–1	8–4	.472	.480	W3
2	Kansas City Chiefs	West	12	5	0	.706	5–1	7–5	.538	.517	W1
3	Buffalo Bills	East	11	6	0	.647	5–1	7–5	.472	.428	W4
4	Cincinnati Bengals	North	10	7	0	.588	4–2	8–4	.472	.462	L1
**Wild cards**
5 (Note: Las Vegas claimed the No. 5 seed over New England based on win percentage in common games (5–1 vs. 2–4 against: Miami, Dallas, LA Chargers, Cleveland, and Indianapolis).)	Las Vegas Raiders	West	10	7	0	.588	3–3	8–4	.510	.515	W4
6	New England Patriots	East	10	7	0	.588	3–3	8–4	.481	.394	L1
7	Pittsburgh Steelers	North	9	7	1	.559	4–2	7–5	.521	.490	W2
**Did not qualify for the postseason**
8 (Note: Indianapolis finished ahead of Miami and Los Angeles based on conference record (7–5 vs. 6–6).)	Indianapolis Colts	South	9	8	0	.529	3–3	7–5	.495	.431	L2
9 (Note: Miami finished ahead of LA Chargers based on win percentage in common games (5–1 vs. 2–4 against: New England, Las Vegas, Houston, Baltimore, and NY Giants).)	Miami Dolphins	East	9	8	0	.529	4–2	6–6	.464	.379	W1
10	Los Angeles Chargers	West	9	8	0	.529	3–3	6–6	.510	.500	L1
11 (Note: Cleveland finished ahead of Baltimore based on division record (3–3 vs. 1–5).)	Cleveland Browns	North	8	9	0	.471	3–3	5–7	.514	.415	W1
12	Baltimore Ravens	North	8	9	0	.471	1–5	5–7	.531	.460	L6
13	Denver Broncos	West	7	10	0	.412	1–5	3–9	.484	.357	L4
14 (Note: NY Jets finished ahead of Houston based on head-to-head victory.)	New York Jets	East	4	13	0	.235	0–6	4–8	.512	.426	L2
15	Houston Texans	South	4	13	0	.235	3–3	4–8	.498	.397	L2
16	Jacksonville Jaguars	South	3	14	0	.176	1–5	3–9	.512	.569	W1
**Tiebreakers** (Note: When breaking ties for three or more teams under the NFL's rules, they are first broken within divisions, then comparing only the highest-ranked remaining team from each division.)

== Postseason ==
=== Schedule ===
Round	Date	Opponent (seed)	Result	Record	Venue	Recap
Wild Card	January 15	New England Patriots (6)	W 47–17	1–0	Highmark Stadium	Recap
Divisional	January 23	at Kansas City Chiefs (2)	L 36–42 (OT)	1–1	Arrowhead Stadium	Recap

=== Game summaries ===
==== AFC Wild Card Playoffs: vs. (6) New England Patriots ====
AFC Wild Card Playoffs: (6) New England Patriots at (3) Buffalo Bills – Game summary

Quarter	1	2	3	4	Total
Patriots	0	3	7	7	17
Bills	14	13	6	14	47

at Highmark Stadium, Orchard Park, New York

- Date: January 15, 2022
- Game time: 8:15 p.m. EST
- Game weather: Clear, 7 °F (−14 °C)
- Game attendance: 69,188
- Referee: Brad Allen
- TV announcers (CBS): Ian Eagle, Charles Davis, and Evan Washburn
- Recap, Game Book

Game information

First quarter

- BUF – Dawson Knox 8-yard pass from Josh Allen (Tyler Bass kick), 9:45. Bills 7–0. Drive: 9 plays, 70 yards, 5:15.
- BUF – Dawson Knox 11-yard pass from Josh Allen (Tyler Bass kick), 0:40. Bills 14–0. Drive: 10 plays, 80 yards, 5:00.

Second quarter

- BUF – Devin Singletary 3-yard run (kick blocked), 7:20. Bills 20–0. Drive: 10 plays, 81 yards, 6:03.
- BUF – Devin Singletary 16-yard run (Tyler Bass kick), 1:53 . Bills 27–0. Drive: 4 plays, 89 yards, 1:51.
- NE – Nick Folk 44-yard field goal, 0:01. Bills 27–3. Drive: 10 plays, 49 yards, 1:52.

Third quarter

- BUF – Emmanuel Sanders 34-yard pass from Josh Allen (kick blocked), 8:48. Bills 33–3. Drive: 6 plays, 58 yards, 4:05.
- NE – Kendrick Bourne 3-yard pass from Mac Jones (Nick Folk kick), 4:12. Bills 33–10. Drive: 11 plays, 75 yards, 4:36.

Fourth quarter

- BUF – Gabe Davis 19-yard pass from Josh Allen (Tyler Bass kick), 13:22. Bills 40–10. Drive: 9 plays, 77 yards, 5:50.
- BUF – Tommy Doyle 1-yard pass from Josh Allen (Tyler Bass kick), 8:37. Bills 47–10. Drive: 3 plays, 39 yards, 1:36.
- NE – Kendrick Bourne 4-yard pass from Mac Jones (Nick Folk kick), 1:44. Bills 47–17. Drive: 15 plays, 75 yards, 6:53.

Top passers

- NE – Mac Jones – 24/38, 232 yards, 2 TD, 2 INT
- BUF – Josh Allen – 21/25, 308 yards, 5 TD

Top rushers

- NE – Damien Harris – 9 rushes, 30 yards
- BUF – Devin Singletary – 16 rushes, 81 yards, 2 TD

Top receivers

- NE – Kendrick Bourne – 7 receptions, 77 yards, 2 TD
- BUF – Dawson Knox – 5 receptions, 89 yards, 2 TD

The Bills became the first team in the Super Bowl era to score a touchdown on each of their first seven drives of a playoff game. Additionally, they became the only team in NFL history to not attempt a field goal, punt, or commit a turnover in a single game (regular season or postseason).

==== AFC Divisional Playoffs: at (2) Kansas City Chiefs ====
AFC Divisional Playoffs: (3) Buffalo Bills at (2) Kansas City Chiefs – Game summary

Quarter	1	2	3	4	OT	Total
Bills	7	7	7	15	0	36
Chiefs	7	7	9	13	6	42

at Arrowhead Stadium, Kansas City, Missouri

- Date: January 23, 2022
- Game time: 6:30 p.m. EST/5:30 p.m. CST
- Game weather: 37 °F (3 °C)
- Game attendance: 73,242
- Referee: John Hussey
- TV announcers (CBS): Jim Nantz, Tony Romo, Tracy Wolfson, and Jay Feely
- Recap, Game Book

Game information

First quarter

- BUF – Devin Singletary 1-yard run (Tyler Bass kick), 8:03. Bills 7–0. Drive: 13 plays, 71 yards, 6:57.
- KC – Patrick Mahomes 8-yard run (Harrison Butker kick), 2:26. Tied 7–7. Drive: 11 plays, 74 yards, 5:37.

Second quarter

- KC – Byron Pringle 2-yard pass from Patrick Mahomes (Harrison Butker kick), 1:52. Chiefs 14–7. Drive: 12 plays, 86 yards, 6:51.
- BUF – Gabe Davis 18-yard pass from Josh Allen (Tyler Bass kick), 0:37. Tied 14–14. Drive: 7 plays, 75 yards, 1:15.

Third quarter

- KC – Harrison Butker 39-yard field goal, 7:01. Chiefs 17–14. Drive: 13 plays, 54 yards, 7:59.
- KC – Mecole Hardman 25-yard run (kick failed, hit left upright), 2:06. Chiefs 23–14. Drive: 5 plays, 61 yards, 2:43.
- BUF – Gabe Davis 75-yard pass from Josh Allen (Tyler Bass kick), 1:56. Chiefs 23–21. Drive: 1 play, 75 yards, 0:10.

Fourth quarter

- KC – Harrison Butker 28-yard field goal, 8:55. Chiefs 26–21. Drive: 4 plays, 6 yards, 2:33.
- BUF – Gabe Davis 27-yard pass from Josh Allen (Josh Allen–Stefon Diggs pass), 1:54. Bills 29–26. Drive: 17 plays, 75 yards, 7:01.
- KC – Tyreek Hill 64-yard pass from Patrick Mahomes (Harrison Butker kick), 1:02. Chiefs 33–29. Drive: 5 plays, 75 yards, 0:52.
- BUF – Gabe Davis 19-yard pass from Josh Allen (Tyler Bass kick), 0:13. Bills 36–33. Drive: 6 plays, 75 yards, 0:49.
- KC – Harrison Butker 49-yard field goal, 0:00. Tied 36–36. Drive: 3 plays, 44 yards, 0:13.

Overtime

- KC – Travis Kelce 8-yard pass from Patrick Mahomes, 10:45. Chiefs 42–36. Drive: 8 plays, 75 yards, 4:15.

Top passers

- BUF – Josh Allen – 27/37, 329 yards, 4 TD
- KC – Patrick Mahomes – 33/44, 378 yards, 3 TD

Top rushers

- BUF – Josh Allen – 11 rushes, 68 yards
- KC – Patrick Mahomes – 7 rushes, 69 yards, TD

Top receivers

- BUF – Gabe Davis – 8 receptions, 201 yards, 4 TD
- KC – Tyreek Hill – 11 receptions, 150 yards, TD

After a back-and-forth first half, Kansas City took a 9-point lead in the third quarter with a Mecole Hardman rushing touchdown before Buffalo struck back on the next play with a 75-yard touchdown pass from Josh Allen to Gabe Davis. The Chiefs led 26–21 in the 4th quarter after Tyreek Hill set up a field goal with a 45-yard punt return. Allen then led the Bills on a 7-minute, 75-yard drive to retake the lead, scoring the first 8 points of 25 by both teams in the final two minutes of the game; the lead would change twice afterwards, with Kansas City and Buffalo scoring quick touchdowns within seconds of each other.

Buffalo took a 36–33 lead with 13 seconds left, but controversially opted to eschew a squib kick for a traditional kickoff out of the endzone for a touchback setting up the Chiefs at their own 25-yard-line with all three of their timeouts remaining. Chiefs quarterback Patrick Mahomes completed a 19-yard pass to Hill that ran just 5 seconds off the clock, then threw a 25-yard pass to Travis Kelce, giving Kansas City a first down on the Bills 31-yard line after running down another 5 seconds. On the next play, Butker's 49-yard field goal sent the game into overtime.

Getting the ball first in overtime, Mahomes rushed for 4 yards and completed 5/5 passes for 50 yards, including a 16-yard pass to McKinnon and a 26-yard throw to Hardman. He finished the drive with an 8-yard touchdown pass to Kelce that sealed the win for Kansas City and eliminated the Bills from the playoffs for the second season in a row, ending their season.

== Statistics ==
=== Team ===
Category	Total yards	Yards per game	NFL rank (out of 32)
Passing offense	4,284	252.0	9th
Rushing offense	2,209	129.9	6th
Total offense	6,493	381.9	5th
Passing defense	2,771	163.0	1st
Rushing defense	1,866	109.8	13th
Total defense	4,637	272.8	1st

=== Individual ===
Category	Player	Total yards
Offense
Passing	Josh Allen	4,407
Rushing	Devin Singletary	870
Receiving	Stefon Diggs	1,225
Defense
Tackles (Solo)	Tremaine Edmunds	70
Sacks	Mario Addison	7
Interceptions	Micah Hyde	5

Statistics correct as of the end of the 2021 NFL season
