= John Hussey (American football official) =

American football official

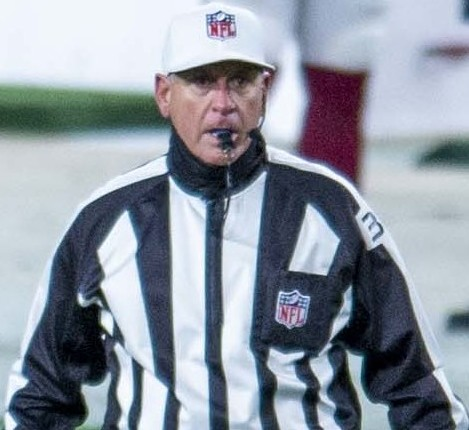
- Hussey in 2020
- Born: 1964 (age 61–62)
- Occupation: NFL official (2002–present)

John J. Hussey (born 1964) is an American professional football official in the National Football League (NFL). Hussey was hired as a Line Judge in the 2002 NFL season. Hussey was promoted to the Referee position for the start of the 2015 NFL season following the retirement of Bill Leavy. Hussey wears uniform number 35.

Hussey officiated Super Bowl XLV in 2011 as the Line Judge and was the alternate Referee in Super Bowls LIV in Miami and LVII in Phoenix. Also, he has officiated four Championship Games: the 2011 NFC Championship Game between the San Francisco 49ers and the New York Giants, the 2013 AFC Championship Game between the New England Patriots and the Denver Broncos, all as a Line Judge, the 2020 NFC Championship game between the Green Bay Packers and the San Francisco 49ers and the 2023 NFC Championship Game between the San Francisco 49ers and the Philadelphia Eagles as the Referee.

His first NFL career game as a Referee was in 2015 was on September 13 in Tampa Bay where he officiated the Tennessee Titans and the Tampa Bay Buccaneers where the first and second overall picks played in the game.

Hussey was the referee in the Detroit Lions' 18–16 surprise victory over the Green Bay Packers at Lambeau Field in Green Bay, WI on November 15, 2015, their first in the state of Wisconsin since 1991.

Outside of his officiating career, Hussey is CEO and co-founder of CUDDLY, a marketplace built specifically for animal welfare groups worldwide to help them fundraise for animals in need.

== 2024 crew ==
- R: John Hussey
- U: Tony Michalek
- DJ: Max Causey
- LJ: Carl Johnson
- FJ: Anthony Flemming
- SJ: Allen Baynes
- BJ: Matt Edwards
- RO: Andrew Lambert
- RA: Sebrina Brunson
