= 2022 Miami Dolphins season =

57th season in franchise history, first playoff berth since 2016

- Owner: Stephen M. Ross
- General manager: Chris Grier
- Head coach: Mike McDaniel
- Offensive coordinator: Frank Smith
- Defensive coordinator: Vic Fangio
- Home stadium: Hard Rock Stadium

Results
- Record: 9–8
- Division place: 2nd AFC East
- Playoffs: Lost Wild Card Playoffs (at Bills) 31–34
- All-Pros: WR Tyreek Hill (1st team)
- Pro Bowlers: 4: WR Tyreek Hill; T Terron Armstead; CB Xavien Howard; LB Bradley Chubb

Uniform
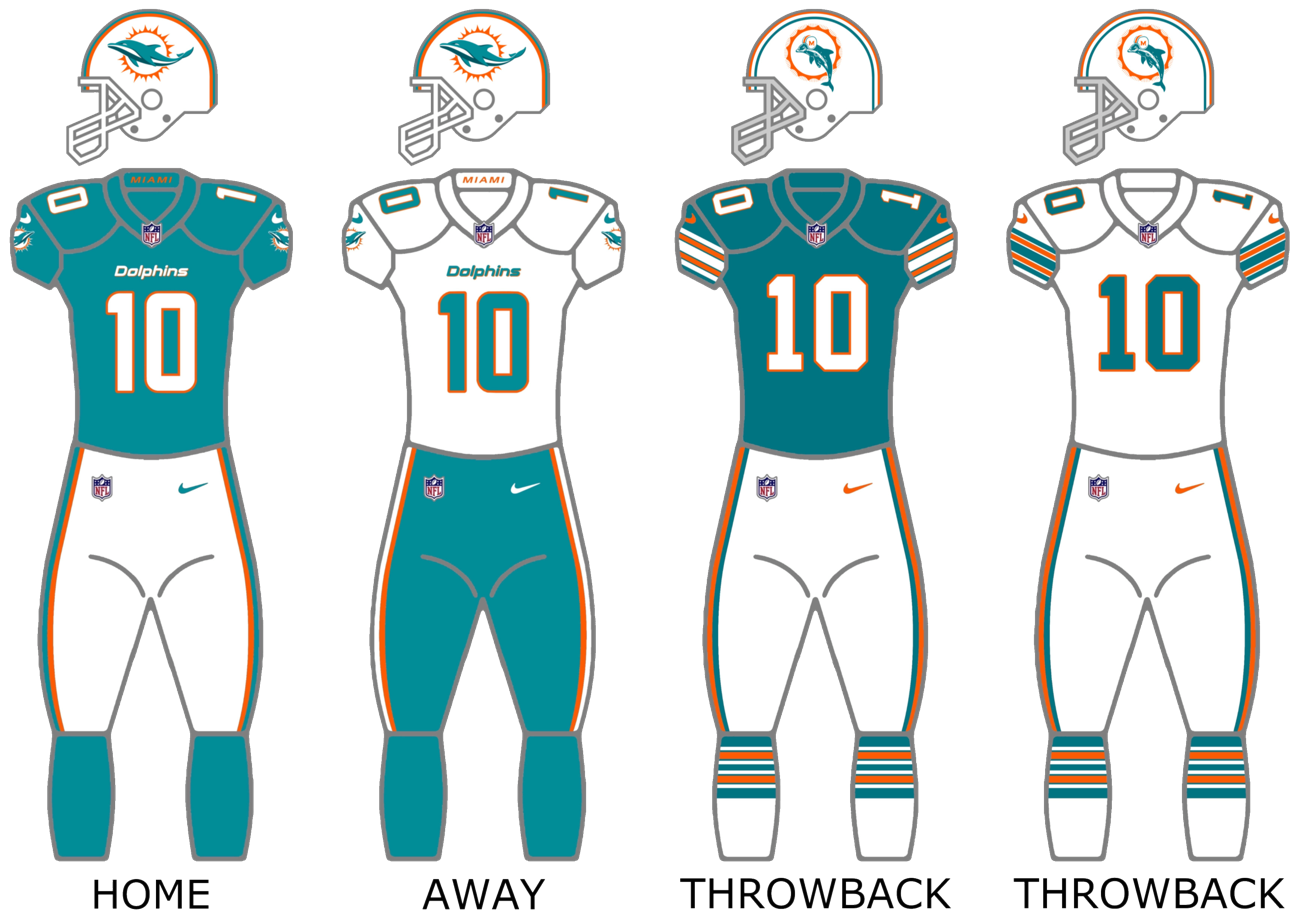

The 2022 season was the Miami Dolphins' 53rd in the National Football League (NFL), their 57th overall, the first under new head coach Mike McDaniel, and seventh under general manager Chris Grier. It also set out with the acquisition of 3x All-Pro receiver Tyreek Hill, who joined Jaylen Waddle as Tua Tagovailoa's receiving duo after breaking contract talks with the Chiefs and being traded in March.

The Dolphins made the playoffs for the first time since 2016, finishing with three straight winning seasons for the first time since the 2001–2003 seasons. With an 8–3 record by Week 12, the Dolphins had their best start since the 2001 season. However, despite starting the season 8–3, the Dolphins suffered a late-season collapse, losing five straight games. It was marred by a couple of concussions sustained by Tagovailoa that brought into question the teams' handling of concussion protocol and caused him to miss or leave six games. They ultimately won their final regular-season game over the New York Jets to secure another winning season, matching their 9–8 record from the previous year, and made it into the playoffs for the first time since 2016. The Dolphins attempted to get their first playoff win since 2000 with third-string quarterback Skylar Thompson replacing Tagovailoa. Despite a late rally, Miami fell to division rival Buffalo, 34–31.

Some notable moments from the regular season include Miami's first win over Buffalo and Detroit since the 2018 and 2006 seasons, respectively, their first away win over Baltimore since 1997, and their first loss at home to Minnesota since 1976. They were also part of the “Butt Punt” which became a meme on social media.

== Draft ==
2022 Miami Dolphins Draft
Round	Selection	Player	Position	College	Notes
1	15	Traded to Philadelphia (Note: The Dolphins traded their first-round selection (15th overall) as well as 2021 first and fourth-round selections (12th and 123rd overall) to the Philadelphia Eagles in exchange for Philadelphia's 2021 first and fifth-round selections (6th and 156th overall).)			
1	29	Traded to Kansas City (Note: The Dolphins traded first, second, and fourth-round selections (29th, 50th and 121st overall), as well as 2023 fourth and sixth-round selections to the Kansas City Chiefs in exchange for WR Tyreek Hill.)			from San Francisco (Note: The Dolphins traded a 2021 first-round selection (3rd overall) to the San Francisco 49ers in exchange for first- and third-round selections (29th and 102nd overall), as well as first-round selections in 2021 (12th overall) and 2023.)
2	50	Traded to Kansas City			
3	81	Traded to the New York Giants (Note: The Dolphins traded a third-round selection (81st overall) and a 2021 second-round selection (50th overall) to the New York Giants in exchange for a 2021 second-round selection (42nd overall).)			
3	102	Channing Tindall	ILB	Georgia	2020 Resolution JC-2A selection; from San Francisco
4	121	Traded to Kansas City			
4	125	Erik Ezukanma	WR	Texas Tech	from Pittsburgh (Note: The Dolphins traded a 2021 fifth-round selection (207th overall) to the Pittsburgh Steelers in exchange for a fourth-round selection (125th overall).)
5	158	Traded to New England (Note: The Dolphins traded WR DeVante Parker and a fifth-round selection (158th overall) to the New England Patriots in exchange for a 2023 third-round selection.)			
6	196	Traded to Baltimore (Note: The Dolphins traded a sixth-round selection (196th overall) to the Baltimore Ravens in exchange for C Greg Mancz and a seventh-round selection (224th overall).)			
7	224	Cameron Goode	OLB	Cal	from Houston via New England and Baltimore
7	238	Traded to the Los Angeles Rams (Note: The Dolphins traded a seventh-round selection (238th overall) to the Los Angeles Rams in exchange for CB Aqib Talib and a 2020 fifth-round selection (173rd overall).)			
7	242	Traded to Carolina (Note: The Dolphins traded a seventh-round selection (242nd overall) to the Carolina Panthers in exchange for OT Greg Little.)			from New England (Note: The Dolphins traded WR Isaiah Ford to the New England Patriots in exchange for a conditional seventh-round selection (242nd overall).)
7	247	Skylar Thompson	QB	Kansas State	from Tennessee (Note: The Dolphins traded a 2021 seventh-round selection (232nd overall) to the Tennessee Titans in exchange for OL Isaiah Wilson and a seventh-round selection (247th overall).)

Draft trades

2022 Miami Dolphins undrafted free agents
Name	Position	College	Ref.
Blaise Andries	OT, G	Minnesota	
Owen Carney Jr.	OLB	Illinois	
Ty Clary	C	Arkansas	
Tanner Conner	TE	Idaho State	
Kellen Diesch	OT	Arizona State	
Elijah Hamilton	CB	Louisiana Tech	
Tommy Heatherly	P	Florida INT	
Deandre Johnson	LB	Miami (FL)	
Kader Kohou	CB	Texas A&M–Commerce	
Verone McKinley III	S	Oregon	
Braylon Sanders	WR	Ole Miss	
Ben Stille	DT	Nebraska	
ZaQuandre White	RB	South Carolina	
Jordan Williams	DT	Virginia Tech	

== Staff ==
2022 Miami Dolphins staff
Front office: Chairman/managing general partner – Stephen Ross; Vice chairman/partner – Bruce Beal; Vice chairman – Jorge Pérez; Vice chairman – Matt Higgins; Vice chairman, president, and CEO – Tom Garfinkel; General manager – Chris Grier; Assistant general manager – Marvin Allen; Vice president, football administration – Brandon Shore; Senior vice president, chief financial officer – Chris Clements; Senior personnel executive – Reggie McKenzie; Co-director, player personnel – Adam Engroff; Co-director, player personnel – Anthony Hunt; Director of college scouting – Matt Winston; Senior scout – Jim Abrams; Special advisor to the vice chairman, president, and CEO – Dan Marino; Head coaches: Head coach – Mike McDaniel; Associate head coach/running backs – Eric Studesville; Assistant head coach/tight ends – Jon Embree; Offensive coaches: Offensive coordinator – Frank Smith; Quarterbacks/passing game coordinator – Darrell Bevell; Assistant quarterbacks – Chandler Henley; Wide receivers – Wes Welker; Offensive line – Matt Applebaum; Assistant offensive line – Lemuel Jeanpierre; Offensive assistant – Mike Person; Offensive assistant – Aldrick Robinson; Offensive assistant – Kolby Smith; Quality control – Josh Grizzard	Defensive coaches: Defensive coordinator – Josh Boyer; Defensive line – Austin Clark; Assistant defensive line – Derrick LeBlanc; Outside linebackers – Tyrone McKenzie; Linebackers – Anthony Campanile; Assistant linebackers – Steve Ferentz; Cornerbacks/pass game specialist – Sam Madison; Safeties – Steve Gregory; Assistant defensive backs – Mathieu Araujo; Senior defensive assistant – Ryan Slowik; Defensive assistant – Patrick Surtain; Special teams coaches: Special teams coordinator – Danny Crossman; Assistant special teams – Brendan Farrell; Special teams assistant – Ricardo Allen; Strength and conditioning: Head strength and conditioning – Dave Puloka; Assistant strength and conditioning – Adam Lachance

== Final roster ==
2022 Miami Dolphins roster
Quarterbacks (QB): 5 Teddy Bridgewater; 1 Tua Tagovailoa; 19 Skylar Thompson; Running backs (RB): 26 Salvon Ahmed; 30 Alec Ingold FB; 31 Raheem Mostert; 23 Jeff Wilson; Wide receivers (WR): 85 River Cracraft; 18 Erik Ezukanma; 10 Tyreek Hill; 14 Trent Sherfield; 17 Jaylen Waddle; 11 Cedrick Wilson Jr.; Tight ends (TE): 80 Tanner Conner; 88 Mike Gesicki; 84 Hunter Long; 81 Durham Smythe	Offensive linemen (OL): 72 Terron Armstead T; 78 Geron Christian T; 63 Michael Deiter C; 74 Liam Eichenberg G; 68 Robert Hunt G; 65 Robert Jones G; 70 Kendall Lamm T; 75 Greg Little T; 71 Brandon Shell T; 58 Connor Williams C; Defensive linemen (DL): 98 Raekwon Davis NT; 77 John Jenkins NT; 92 Zach Sieler DE; 94 Christian Wilkins DE	Linebackers (LB): 55 Jerome Baker ILB; 2 Bradley Chubb OLB; 49 Samuel Eguavoen ILB; 6 Melvin Ingram OLB; 15 Jaelan Phillips OLB; 45 Duke Riley ILB; 52 Elandon Roberts ILB; 41 Channing Tindall ILB; 43 Andrew Van Ginkel OLB; Defensive backs (DB): 20 Justin Bethel CB; 22 Elijah Campbell FS; 27 Keion Crossen CB; 42 Clayton Fejedelem SS; 8 Jevon Holland FS; 25 Xavien Howard CB; 9 Noah Igbinoghene CB; 28 Kader Kohou CB; 32 Verone McKinley III FS; 21 Eric Rowe SS; Special teams (ST): 44 Blake Ferguson LS; 4 Thomas Morstead P; 7 Jason Sanders K	Practice squad: 48 Jake Bargas FB; 95 Josiah Bronson DE; 66 Lester Cotton G; 34 Tino Ellis CB; 62 James Empey C; 16 Mike Glennon QB; 53 Cameron Goode OLB; 96 Porter Gustin OLB (PS/I); 35 Ka'dar Hollman CB; 87 Calvin Jackson Jr. WR; 90 R. J. McIntosh DE; 33 La'Mical Perine RB; 36 Jamal Perry CB; 86 Braylon Sanders WR; 57 Brennan Scarlett OLB; 76 Kion Smith T; 97 Jaylen Twyman DE; Reserve: 82 Cethan Carter TE (IR); 93 Trey Flowers OLB (IR); 79 Eric Fisher T (IR); 3 Myles Gaskin RB (IR); 73 Austin Jackson T (IR); 29 Brandon Jones SS (IR); 24 Byron Jones CB (PUP); 46 John Lovett FB (IR); 40 Nik Needham CB (IR); 91 Emmanuel Ogbah DE (IR); -- Adam Shaheen TE (IR); -- Trill Williams CB (IR); 96 Justin Zimmer DE (IR); Rookies in italics 53 active, 13 reserve, 16 practice squad (1 exempt)

== Preseason ==
Week	Date	Opponent	Result	Record	Venue	Recap
1	August 13	at Tampa Bay Buccaneers	W 26–24	1–0	Raymond James Stadium	Recap
2	August 20	Las Vegas Raiders	L 13–15	1–1	Hard Rock Stadium	Recap
3	August 27	Philadelphia Eagles	W 48–10	2–1	Hard Rock Stadium	Recap

== Regular season ==
=== Schedule ===
Week	Date	Opponent	Result	Record	Venue	Recap
1	September 11	**New England Patriots**	**W** 20–7	1–0	Hard Rock Stadium	Recap
2	September 18	at Baltimore Ravens	**W** 42–38	2–0	M&T Bank Stadium	Recap
3	September 25	**Buffalo Bills**	**W** 21–19	3–0	Hard Rock Stadium	Recap
4	September 29	at Cincinnati Bengals	**L** 15–27	3–1	Paycor Stadium	Recap
5	October 9	at **New York Jets**	**L** 17–40	3–2	MetLife Stadium	Recap
6	October 16	Minnesota Vikings	**L** 16–24	3–3	Hard Rock Stadium	Recap
7	October 23	Pittsburgh Steelers	**W** 16–10	4–3	Hard Rock Stadium	Recap
8	October 30	at Detroit Lions	**W** 31–27	5–3	Ford Field	Recap
9	November 6	at Chicago Bears	**W** 35–32	6–3	Soldier Field	Recap
10	November 13	Cleveland Browns	**W** 39–17	7–3	Hard Rock Stadium	Recap
11	Bye					
12	November 27	Houston Texans	**W** 30–15	8–3	Hard Rock Stadium	Recap
13	December 4	at San Francisco 49ers	**L** 17–33	8–4	Levi's Stadium	Recap
14	December 11	at Los Angeles Chargers	**L** 17–23	8–5	SoFi Stadium	Recap
15	December 17	at **Buffalo Bills**	**L** 29–32	8–6	Highmark Stadium	Recap
16	December 25	Green Bay Packers	**L** 20–26	8–7	Hard Rock Stadium	Recap
17	January 1	at **New England Patriots**	**L** 21–23	8–8	Gillette Stadium	Recap
18	January 8	**New York Jets**	**W** 11–6	9–8	Hard Rock Stadium	Recap

Note: Intra-division opponents are in bold text.

=== Game summaries ===
==== Week 1: vs. New England Patriots ====
Week 1: New England Patriots at Miami Dolphins – Game summary

Quarter	1	2	3	4	Total
Patriots	0	0	7	0	**7**
**Dolphins**	3	14	3	0	**20**

at Hard Rock Stadium, Miami Gardens, Florida

- Date: September 11
- Game time: 1:00 p.m. EDT
- Game weather: Partly cloudy, 92 °F (33 °C)
- Game attendance: 65,786
- Referee: John Hussey
- TV announcers (CBS): Greg Gumbel, Adam Archuleta and AJ Ross
- Recap, Game Book

Game information

**First quarter**

- MIA – Jason Sanders 43-yard field goal, 4:06. Dolphins 3–0. **Drive: 11 plays, 47 yards, 5:46.**

**Second quarter**

- MIA – Melvin Ingram 2-yard fumble return (Jason Sanders kick), 7:40. Dolphins 10–0.
- MIA – Jaylen Waddle 42-yard pass from Tua Tagovailoa (Jason Sanders kick), 0:18. Dolphins 17–0. **Drive: 10 plays, 92 yards, 3:47.**

**Third quarter**

- NE – Ty Montgomery 6-yard pass from Mac Jones (Nick Folk kick), 4:44. Dolphins 17–7. **Drive: 15 plays, 92 yards, 8:21.**
- MIA – Jason Sanders 49-yard field goal, 0:19. Dolphins 20–7. **Drive: 8 plays, 50 yards, 4:25.**

**Fourth quarter**

- No scoring plays.

**Top passers**

- NE – Mac Jones – 21/30, 213 yards, TD, INT
- MIA – Tua Tagovailoa – 23/33, 270 yards, TD

**Top rushers**

- NE – Damien Harris – 9 rushes, 48 yards
- MIA – Chase Edmonds – 12 rushes, 25 yards

**Top receivers**

- NE – Jakobi Meyers – 4 receptions, 55 yards
- MIA – Tyreek Hill – 8 receptions, 94 yards

Head coach Mike McDaniel recorded his first win as a head coach and became the first Dolphins coach since Nick Saban in 2005 to win their first game as Dolphins head coach, as well as the first head coach in Dolphins history to win their head coaching debut. Quarterback Tua Tagovailoa joined former Denver Broncos quarterbacks John Elway and Jake Plummer as the only QBs to beat a Bill Belichick-coached team at least three times without a loss. With the win, the Dolphins began the season 1–0. The win was the 497th in Dolphins history.

==== Week 2: at Baltimore Ravens ====
Week 2: Miami Dolphins at Baltimore Ravens – Game summary

Quarter	1	2	3	4	Total
**Dolphins**	0	7	7	28	**42**
Ravens	7	21	7	3	**38**

at M&T Bank Stadium, Baltimore, Maryland

- Date: September 18
- Game time: 1:00 p.m. EDT
- Game weather: Sunny, 82 °F (28 °C)
- Game attendance: 70,582
- Referee: Adrian Hill
- TV announcers (CBS): Kevin Harlan, Trent Green and Melanie Collins
- Recap, Game Book

Game information

**First quarter**

- BAL – Devin Duvernay 103-yard kick off return (Justin Tucker kick), 14:47. Ravens 7–0.

**Second quarter**

- MIA – Jaylen Waddle 6-yard pass from Tua Tagovailoa (Jason Sanders kick), 10:54. Tied 7–7. **Drive: 6 plays, 94 yards, 3:49.**
- BAL – Rashod Bateman 75-yard pass from Lamar Jackson (Justin Tucker kick), 10:44. Ravens 14–7. **Drive: 1 play, 75 yards, 0:10.**
- BAL – Mark Andrews 1-yard pass from Lamar Jackson (Justin Tucker kick), 4:03. Ravens 21–7. **Drive: 6 plays, 66 yards, 2:43.**
- BAL – Demarcus Robinson 12-yard pass from Lamar Jackson (Justin Tucker kick), 0:29. Ravens 28–7. **Drive: 6 plays, 80 yards, 0:51.**

**Third quarter**

- MIA – Mike Gesicki 14-yard pass from Tua Tagovailoa (Jason Sanders kick), 7:52. Ravens 28–14. **Drive: 12 plays, 75 yards, 7:08.**
- BAL – Lamar Jackson 79-yard run (Justin Tucker kick), 0:26. Ravens 35–14. **Drive: 3 plays, 87 yards, 1:34.**

**Fourth quarter**

- MIA – River Cracraft 2-yard pass from Tua Tagovailoa (Jason Sanders kick), 12:12. Ravens 35–21. **Drive: 7 plays, 75 yards, 3:14.**
- MIA – Tyreek Hill 48-yard pass from Tua Tagovailoa (Jason Sanders kick), 7:47. Ravens 35–28. **Drive: 5 plays, 59 yards, 1:24.**
- MIA – Tyreek Hill 60-yard pass from Tua Tagovailoa (Jason Sanders kick), 5:19. Tied 35–35. **Drive: 3 plays, 64 yards, 1:27.**
- BAL – Justin Tucker 51-yard field goal, 2:18. Ravens 38–35. **Drive: 6 plays, 42 yards, 3:01.**
- MIA – Jaylen Waddle 7-yard pass from Tua Tagovailoa (Jason Sanders kick), 0:14. Dolphins 42–38. **Drive: 6 plays, 68 yards, 2:04.**

**Top passers**

- MIA – Tua Tagovailoa – 36/50, 469 yards, 6 TD, 2 INT
- BAL – Lamar Jackson – 21/29, 318 yards, 3 TD

**Top rushers**

- MIA – Raheem Mostert – 11 rushes, 51 yards
- BAL – Lamar Jackson – 9 rushes, 119 yards, TD

**Top receivers**

- MIA – Tyreek Hill – 11 receptions, 190 yards, 2 TD
- BAL – Rashod Bateman – 4 receptions, 108 yards, TD

The Dolphins defeated the Ravens on the road for the first time since the two teams' inaugural meeting in 1997. The game saw the Dolphins trail by as much as 21 points at two separate times in the game (down 7–28 at halftime and later 14–35 at the end of the 3rd quarter). Facing almost certain defeat, quarterback Tua Tagovailoa orchestrated four touchdown drives late in the game during the fourth quarter (including back-to-back 40+ yard scores to Tyreek Hill) to tie the game up at 35–35. The Ravens attempted to end the game with a 51-yard field goal courtesy of Justin Tucker to go ahead 38–35, but on the ensuing drive, Tagovailoa hit Jaylen Waddle for the game-winning touchdown with 14 seconds left to make the score 42–38. The Dolphins' defense held for the rest of the game, and hung on for the comeback win, and left M&T Bank Stadium with a stunned partisan crowd of Raven fans behind. Tagovailoa finished the game with a career-high 469 passing yards and six touchdowns and receivers Waddle and Hill became the first pair of teammates in NFL history to catch 10 passes for over 150 yards and two touchdowns in the same game. With the win, the Dolphins improved to 2–0. It was also Miami's first ever win at M&T Bank Stadium (the Dolphins’ 1997 win was at War Memorial Stadium) and the 42 points scored exceeded the 39 combined points they had scored in four previous trips to the Ravens’ stadium. The win was the 498th in Dolphins history.

==== Week 3: vs. Buffalo Bills ====
Week 3: Buffalo Bills at Miami Dolphins – Game summary

Quarter	1	2	3	4	Total
Bills	7	7	3	2	**19**
**Dolphins**	7	7	0	7	**21**

at Hard Rock Stadium, Miami Gardens, Florida

- Date: September 25
- Game time: 1:00 p.m. EDT
- Game weather: Partly sunny, 89 °F (32 °C)
- Game attendance: 66,206
- Referee: Alex Kemp
- TV announcers (CBS): Kevin Harlan, Trent Green and Melanie Collins
- Recap, Game Book

Game information

**First quarter**

- BUF – Devin Singletary 2-yard pass from Josh Allen (Tyler Bass kick), 9:03. Bills 7–0. **Drive: 10 plays, 75 yards, 5:57.**
- MIA – Chase Edmonds 1-yard run (Jason Sanders kick), 3:37. Tied 7–7. **Drive: 3 plays, 6 yards, 1:36.**

**Second quarter**

- BUF – Isaiah McKenzie 8-yard pass from Josh Allen (Tyler Bass kick), 11:59. Bills 14–7. **Drive: 14 plays, 75 yards, 6:38.**
- MIA – River Cracraft 11-yard pass from Tua Tagovailoa (Jason Sanders kick), 6:45. Tied 14–14. **Drive: 9 plays, 83 yards, 5:14.**

**Third quarter**

- BUF – Tyler Bass 30-yard field goal, 3:40. Bills 17–14. **Drive: 20 plays, 87 yards, 9:22.**

**Fourth quarter**

- MIA – Chase Edmonds 3-yard run (Jason Sanders kick), 10:05. Dolphins 21–17. **Drive: 7 plays, 72 yards, 4:04.**
- BUF – Thomas Morstead punt blocked recovered by Miami in endzone for a safety, 1:33. **Dolphins 21–19.**

**Top passers**

- BUF – Josh Allen – 42/63, 400 yards, 2 TD
- MIA – Tua Tagovailoa – 13/18, 186 yards, TD

**Top rushers**

- BUF – Josh Allen – 8 rushes, 47 yards
- MIA – Chase Edmonds – 6 rushes, 21 yards, 2 TD

**Top receivers**

- BUF – Devin Singletary – 9 receptions, 78 yards, TD
- MIA – Jaylen Waddle – 4 receptions, 102 yards

The undefeated Bills traveled south to visit the Dolphins, back home at Hard Rock Stadium. In a tightly contested game that was kept within a 1-score possession the entire game, it was a Chase Edmonds touchdown that gave Miami the lead for good, 21–17. Toward the end of the game, a notable incident happened. With Miami lined up in punt formation, punter Thomas Morstead fielded the ball and kicked it with no issue; however, the ball went straight into the rear end of Dolphins blocker Trent Sherfield, who was lined up too close to Morstead. The ball bounced out of bounds for a safety, which cut the score to 21–19. The blocked punt would quickly be coined as "The Butt Punt" by fans online. Despite a desperate late drive by Josh Allen and the Bills' offense, Miami held on for the nail-biting win when the clock ran out before the Bills could spike the ball when they got close to field goal range. This was the Dolphins' first win over the Bills since Week 13 of the 2018 season. With the win, the Dolphins improved to 3–0, their first such start since 2018. The win also marked their 499th victory in franchise history (including playoff games), bringing them one victory away from reaching 500 wins.

Following the game, CBS showed footage of Bills offensive coordinator Ken Dorsey throwing his headseat and playbook onto a table repeatedly in frustration. The footage, although brief, quickly went viral online and soon became a meme. The Dolphins were also criticized for keeping Tagovailoa, who had apparently suffered a concussion from slamming his head on the ground after being hit by Bills linebacker Matt Milano, in the game, instead ruling that he had suffered a "back injury".

==== Week 4: at Cincinnati Bengals ====
Week 4: Miami Dolphins at Cincinnati Bengals – Game summary

Quarter	1	2	3	4	Total
Dolphins	3	9	3	0	**15**
**Bengals**	7	7	0	13	**27**

at Paycor Stadium, Cincinnati, Ohio

- Date: September 29
- Game time: 8:15 p.m. EDT
- Game weather: Clear, 61 °F (16 °C)
- Game attendance: 67,260
- Referee: Tra Blake
- TV announcers (WSFL-TV/Prime Video): Al Michaels, Kirk Herbstreit and Kaylee Hartung
- Recap, Game Book

Game information

**First quarter**

- CIN – Joe Mixon 5-yard run (Evan McPherson kick), 10:19. Bengals 7–0. **Drive: 9 plays, 75 yards, 4:41.**
- MIA – Jason Sanders 23-yard field goal, 6:05. Bengals 7–3. **Drive: 9 plays, 70 yards, 4:14.**

**Second quarter**

- MIA – Jason Sanders 48-yard field goal, 7:31. Bengals 7–6. **Drive: 8 plays, 46 yards, 3:08.**
- CIN – Tee Higgins 59-yard pass from Joe Burrow (Evan McPherson kick), 2:50. Bengals 14–6. **Drive: 3 plays, 58 yards, 1:32.**
- MIA – Chase Edmonds 7-yard pass from Teddy Bridgewater (kick failed), 0:09. Bengals 14–12. **Drive: 9 plays, 75 yards, 2:41.**

**Third quarter**

- MIA – Jason Sanders 20-yard field goal, 2:40. Dolphins 15–14. **Drive: 7 plays, 88 yards, 3:38.**

**Fourth quarter**

- CIN – Evan McPherson 19-yard field goal, 12:00. Bengals 17–15. **Drive: 9 plays, 74 yards, 5:50.**
- CIN – Evan McPherson 57-yard field goal, 6:13. Bengals 20–15. **Drive: 8 plays, 33 yards, 3:36.**
- CIN – Hayden Hurst 2-yard pass from Joe Burrow (Evan McPherson kick), 1:52. Bengals 27–15. **Drive: 5 plays, 45 yards, 1:13.**

**Top passers**

- MIA – Teddy Bridgewater – 14/23, 193 yards, TD, INT
- CIN – Joe Burrow – 20/31, 287 yards, 2 TD

**Top rushers**

- MIA – Raheem Mostert – 15 rushes, 69 yards
- CIN – Joe Mixon – 24 rushes, 61 yards, TD

**Top receivers**

- MIA – Tyreek Hill – 10 receptions, 160 yards, TD
- CIN – Tee Higgins – 7 receptions, 124 yards, TD

The Dolphins' chance at clinching their 500th victory in franchise history came to a screeching halt against a Bengals team still looking to find its footing. Quarterback Tua Tagovailoa, who was cleared to play after being a game-time decision due to his injury from the previous game, was carted off the field after suffering a head injury from a sack by Bengals defender Josh Tupou in the late 2nd quarter. Backup Teddy Bridgewater stepped in for Tagovailoa beginning in the 3rd quarter, where he threw for 193 yards, 1 touchdown, and 1 interception. With the loss, the Dolphins fell to 3–1.

Following the game, it was officially revealed that Tagovailoa had suffered a concussion, leading to considerable backlash against the organization and the NFL regarding the handling of concussions.

==== Week 5: at New York Jets ====
Week 5: Miami Dolphins at New York Jets – Game summary

Quarter	1	2	3	4	Total
Dolphins	0	14	3	0	**17**
**Jets**	5	14	0	21	**40**

at MetLife Stadium, East Rutherford, New Jersey

- Date: October 9
- Game time: 1:00 p.m. EDT
- Game weather: Sunny and windy, 63 °F (17 °C)
- Game attendance: 82,500
- Referee: Clay Martin
- TV announcers (CBS): Kevin Harlan, Trent Green, and Melanie Collins
- Recap, Game Book

Game information

**First quarter**

- NYJ – Teddy Bridgewater intentional grounding in endzone for a safety, 12:47. Jets 2–0.
- NYJ – Greg Zuerlein 34-yard field goal, 3:07. Jets 5–0. **Drive: 7 plays, 56 yards, 3:32.**

**Second quarter**

- NYJ – Michael Carter 1-yard run (Greg Zuerlein kick), 14:56. Jets 12–0. **Drive: 2 plays, 80 yards, 0:56.**
- MIA – Raheem Mostert 12-yard run (Jason Sanders kick), 9:55. Jets 12–7. **Drive: 8 plays, 75 yards, 5:01.**
- NYJ – Zach Wilson 5-yard run (Greg Zuerlein kick), 2:38. Jets 19–7. **Drive: 9 plays, 53 yards, 5:22.**
- MIA – Durham Smythe 1-yard run (Jason Sanders kick), 0:04. Jets 19–14. **Drive: 11 plays, 75 yards, 2:34.**

**Third quarter**

- MIA – Jason Sanders 46-yard field goal, 8:40. Jets 19–17. **Drive: 11 plays, 47 yards, 6:20.**

**Fourth quarter**

- NYJ – Michael Carter 1-yard run (Greg Zuerlein kick), 9:22. Jets 26–17. **Drive: 7 plays, 56 yards, 3:53.**
- NYJ – Breece Hall 1-yard run (Greg Zuerlein kick), 9:08. Jets 33–17. **Drive: 1 play, 5 yards, 0:05.**
- NYJ – Braxton Berrios 15-yard run (Greg Zuerlein kick), 4:24. Jets 40–17. **Drive: 5 plays, 30 yards, 3:07.**

**Top passers**

- MIA – Skylar Thompson – 19/33, 166 yards, INT
- NYJ – Zach Wilson – 14/21, 210 yards

**Top rushers**

- MIA – Raheem Mostert – 18 rushes, 113 yards, TD
- NYJ – Breece Hall – 18 rushes, 97 yards, TD

**Top receivers**

- MIA – Tyreek Hill – 7 receptions, 47 yards
- NYJ – Breece Hall – 2 receptions, 100 yards

Quarterback Teddy Bridgewater made his first start in a Miami Dolphins uniform and just seconds into the game, suffered a concussion that would cause Miami's 3rd string quarterback and 2022 7th-round pick Skylar Thompson to enter the game. In the Dolphins' first loss to the Jets since 2019 and their largest loss to the Jets since 2004, Thompson threw for 166 yards and 1 interception in his NFL debut. With the loss, the Dolphins fell to 3–2.

==== Week 6: vs. Minnesota Vikings ====
Week 6: Minnesota Vikings at Miami Dolphins – Game summary

Quarter	1	2	3	4	Total
**Vikings**	0	10	0	14	**24**
Dolphins	0	3	0	13	**16**

at Hard Rock Stadium, Miami Gardens, Florida

- Date: October 16
- Game time: 1:00 p.m. EDT
- Game weather: Partly cloudy, 86 °F (30 °C)
- Game attendance: 66,100
- Referee: Brad Rogers
- TV announcers (Fox): Kenny Albert, Jonathan Vilma and Shannon Spake
- Recap, Game Book

Game information

**First quarter**

- No scoring plays.

**Second quarter**

- MIA – Jason Sanders 44-yard field goal, 6:05. Dolphins 3–0. **Drive: 9 plays, 36 yards, 5:33.**
- MIN – Irv Smith Jr. 1-yard pass from Kirk Cousins (Greg Joseph kick), 2:32. Vikings 7–3. **Drive: 7 plays, 75 yards, 3:33.**
- MIN – Greg Joseph 34-yard field goal, 0:00. Vikings 10–3. **Drive: 3 plays, 26 yards, 0:18.**

**Third quarter**

- No scoring plays.

**Fourth quarter**

- MIN – Adam Thielen 2-yard pass from Kirk Cousins (kick failed, wide right), 14:13. Vikings 16–3. **Drive: 7 plays, 73 yards, 4:09.**
- MIA – Mike Gesicki 4-yard pass from Teddy Bridgewater (Jason Sanders kick), 10:04. Vikings 16–10. **Drive: 7 plays, 75 yards, 4:09.**
- MIN – Dalvin Cook 53-yard run (Kirk Cousins–Adam Thielen pass), 3:15. Vikings 24–10. **Drive: 2 plays, 59 yards, 0:55.**
- MIA – Mike Gesicki 3-yard pass from Teddy Bridgewater (pass failed), 1:24. Vikings 24–16. **Drive: 6 plays, 83 yards, 1:13.**

**Top passers**

- MIN – Kirk Cousins – 20/30, 175 yards, 2 TD
- MIA – Teddy Bridgewater – 23/34, 329 yards, 2 TD, 2 INT

**Top rushers**

- MIN – Dalvin Cook – 13 rushes, 77 yards, TD
- MIA – Raheem Mostert – 14 rushes, 49 yards

**Top receivers**

- MIN – Justin Jefferson – 6 receptions, 107 yards
- MIA – Tyreek Hill – 12 receptions, 177 yards

Rookie quarterback Skylar Thompson made his first career start due to starters Tua Tagovailoa and Teddy Bridgewater dealing with concussions. Throwing for just 89 yards, Thompson's first career start was cut short due to a thumb injury he suffered during the 2nd quarter. Bridgewater, who previously played for Minnesota from 2014 to 2017, played in relief for Thompson, where he threw for 329 yards, 2 touchdowns, and 2 interceptions. In the 4th quarter, wide receiver Jaylen Waddle fumbled the ball, later recovered by Vikings safety Harrison Smith would cost the Dolphins the game, and it marked their first home loss to the Vikings since 1976. With the loss, the Dolphins fell to 3–3.

==== Week 7: vs. Pittsburgh Steelers ====
Week 7: Pittsburgh Steelers at Miami Dolphins – Game summary

Quarter	1	2	3	4	Total
Steelers	0	10	0	0	**10**
**Dolphins**	13	3	0	0	**16**

at Hard Rock Stadium, Miami Gardens, Florida

- Date: October 23
- Game time: 8:20 p.m. EDT
- Game weather: Partly cloudy, 78 °F (26 °C)
- Game attendance: 66,224
- Referee: Scott Novak
- TV announcers (NBC): Mike Tirico, Cris Collinsworth and Melissa Stark
- Recap, Game Book

Game information

**First quarter**

- MIA – Raheem Mostert 8-yard pass from Tua Tagovailoa (Jason Sanders kick), 10:45. Dolphins 7–0. **Drive: 9 plays, 71 yards, 4:15.**
- MIA – Jason Sanders 24-yard field goal, 5:32. Dolphins 10–0. **Drive: 8 plays, 59 yards, 3:59.**
- MIA – Jason Sanders 42-yard field goal, 2:27. Dolphins 13–0. **Drive: 7 plays, 30 yards, 2:12.**

**Second quarter**

- PIT – Chris Boswell 45-yard field goal, 11:44. Dolphins 13–3. **Drive: 12 plays, 48 yards, 5:43.**
- PIT – George Pickens 7-yard pass from Kenny Pickett (Chris Boswell kick), 1:50. Dolphins 13–10. **Drive: 13 plays, 86 yards, 7:29.**
- MIA – Jason Sanders 47-yard field goal, 0:02. Dolphins 16–10. **Drive: 8 plays, 56 yards, 1:48.**

**Third quarter**

- No scoring plays.

**Fourth quarter**

- No scoring plays.

**Top passers**

- PIT – Kenny Pickett – 32/44, 257 yards, TD, 3 INT
- MIA – Tua Tagovailoa – 21/35, 261 yards, TD

**Top rushers**

- PIT – Najee Harris – 17 rushes, 65 yards
- MIA – Raheem Mostert – 16 rushes, 79 yards

**Top receivers**

- PIT – Pat Freiermuth – 8 receptions, 75 yards
- MIA – Jaylen Waddle – 4 receptions, 88 yards

In the Dolphins' first Sunday Night game since 2017, quarterback Tua Tagovailoa played his first game since suffering a severe concussion in Week 4 that would cause the NFL to change its concussion protocols. Former Dolphins head coach and current Steelers senior defensive assistant/linebackers coach Brian Flores made his first return to Hard Rock Stadium since his abrupt firing from the Dolphins in January 2022. The 50th anniversary of the 1972 undefeated Dolphins were also honored at halftime and the team wore 50th anniversary patches along with throwback uniforms for commemoration. That same season, the Dolphins defeated the Steelers in the AFC Championship Game 21–17. In a heavily defensive game, which saw both defenses hold their opposition scoreless for the entire second half, Tagovailoa threw for 261 yards and a touchdown pass in his first game back from a concussion. Numerous injuries throughout the game drained the defense, including a season-ending leg injury to safety Brandon Jones. In the 3rd quarter, cornerback Noah Igbinoghene intercepted a throw by Steelers quarterback Kenny Pickett in the final seconds of the game to end a nail-biting 16–10 slugfest. It handed Pittsburgh their first 2–5 start since 2013. With their 500th win in franchise history, the Dolphins improved to 4–3.

==== Week 8: at Detroit Lions ====
Week 8: Miami Dolphins at Detroit Lions – Game summary

Quarter	1	2	3	4	Total
**Dolphins**	7	10	14	0	**31**
Lions	14	13	0	0	**27**

at Ford Field, Detroit, Michigan

- Date: October 30
- Game time: 1:00 p.m. EDT
- Game weather: None (indoor stadium)
- Game attendance: 61,447
- Referee: Alex Kemp
- TV announcers (CBS): Andrew Catalon, James Lofton and Amanda Renner
- Recap, Game Book

Game information

**First quarter**

- DET – Jamaal Williams 7-yard run (Michael Badgley kick), 12:59. Lions 7–0. **Drive: 5 plays, 75 yards, 2:01.**
- DET – D'Andre Swift 7-yard pass from Jared Goff (Michael Badgley kick), 5:36. Lions 14–0. **Drive: 6 plays, 78 yards, 2:31.**
- MIA – Jaylen Waddle 5-yard pass from Tua Tagovailoa (Jason Sanders kick), 0:50. Lions 14–7. **Drive: 9 plays, 80 yards, 4:46.**

**Second quarter**

- DET – Jamaal Williams 1-yard run (Michael Badgley kick), 13:46. Lions 21–7. **Drive: 6 plays, 75 yards, 2:04.**
- MIA – Jaylen Waddle 29-yard pass from Tua Tagovailoa (Jason Sanders kick), 11:30. Lions 21–14. **Drive: 4 plays, 75 yards, 2:16.**
- DET – Michael Badgley 42-yard field goal, 7:02. Lions 24–14. **Drive: 11 plays, 51 yards, 4:28.**
- MIA – Jason Sanders 45-yard field goal, 2:06. Lions 24–17. **Drive: 11 plays, 48 yards, 4:56.**
- DET – Michael Badgley 26-yard field goal, 0:00. Lions 27–17. **Drive: 11 plays, 67 yards, 2:06.**

**Third quarter**

- MIA – Alec Ingold 1-yard run (Jason Sanders kick), 9:11. Lions 27–24. **Drive: 9 plays, 75 yards, 5:49.**
- MIA – Mike Gesicki 11-yard pass from Tua Tagovailoa (Jason Sanders kick), 0:12. Dolphins 31–27. **Drive: 9 plays, 67 yards, 5:04.**

**Fourth quarter**

- No scoring plays.

**Top passers**

- MIA – Tua Tagovailoa – 29/36, 382 yards, 3 TD
- DET – Jared Goff – 27/37, 321 yards, TD

**Top rushers**

- MIA – Raheem Mostert – 14 rushes, 64 yards
- DET – Jamaal Williams – 10 rushes, 53 yards, 2 TD

**Top receivers**

- MIA – Tyreek Hill – 12 receptions, 188 yards
- DET – T. J. Hockenson – 3 receptions, 80 yards

The Dolphins flew to Ford Field following their close victory against the Steelers at home to play the slumping Detroit Lions. This was Lions head coach Dan Campbell's first time facing the Dolphins in 7 years, as he previously served as their tight ends coach from 2011 to 2015 under head coaches Tony Sparano and Joe Philbin, and later the interim head coach for much of the 2015 season. In the first quarter, Miami found themselves in a deep hole early on as the Lions went up 14–0 thanks to a Jamaal Williams touchdown and a D'Andre Swift receiving touchdown from Jared Goff. The Dolphins halved the deficit after Tua Tagovailoa hit Jaylen Waddle for a 5-yard touchdown to make the score 14–7. In the second quarter, the exhausted Dolphin defense allowed a quick touchdown from Williams again, courtesy of an efficient, quick 5-play drive that preceded the score. Miami, however would respond with a quick touchdown drive of their own after Tagovailoa hit Waddle for the pair's second touchdown following a quick 3-play drive that included a long strike to Tyreek Hill to cut the score to 21–14. The Lions responded with a Michael Badgley field goal to put the game back to a two-score deficit, but Miami would add a field goal of their own (courtesy of Jason Sanders) to narrow the lead to within 7. Following a defensive stop by the Dolphins, the Lions lined up to punt for what would have been the first time all game, but a clever trick play fake converted the 4th and 2 and kept the drive alive. Detroit capitalized, and added another field goal to go into halftime up 10, 27–17. For the rest of the game, however, the Lions' once high-scoring offense was completely neutralized by a rejuvenated Dolphin defense, which shut out Detroit during the entire second half. The Dolphins capitalized, and in the third quarter hung 14 points on a gassed Detroit defense, courtesy of an Alec Ingold touchdown and a Mike Gesicki touchdown reception from Tagovailoa to make the score 31–27. Both defenses took over during the fourth quarter, and the Dolphins ran out the clock and hung on for the win and Miami's first win over Detroit since 2006. With the victory, Miami improved to 5–3 on the season, and 5–0 in games where Tagovailoa was their starting quarterback.

==== Week 9: at Chicago Bears ====
Week 9: Miami Dolphins at Chicago Bears – Game summary

Quarter	1	2	3	4	Total
**Dolphins**	7	14	14	0	**35**
Bears	3	14	8	7	**32**

at Soldier Field, Chicago, Illinois

- Date: November 6
- Game time: 1:00 p.m. EST/12:00 p.m. CST
- Game weather: Sunny, 62 °F (17 °C)
- Game attendance: 62,377
- Referee: Ronald Torbert
- TV announcers (CBS): Kevin Harlan, Trent Green and Melanie Collins
- Recap, Game Book

Game information

**First quarter**

- CHI – Cairo Santos 32-yard field goal, 11:03. Bears 3–0. **Drive: 8 plays, 61 yards, 3:57.**
- MIA – Raheem Mostert 1-yard run (Jason Sanders kick), 7:33. Dolphins 7–3. **Drive: 6 plays, 75 yards, 3:30.**

**Second quarter**

- CHI – Cole Kmet 18-yard pass from Justin Fields (Cairo Santos kick), 14:52. Bears 10–7. **Drive: 15 plays, 75 yards, 7:41.**
- MIA – Tyreek Hill 3-yard pass from Tua Tagovailoa (Jason Sanders kick), 10:39. Dolphins 14–10. **Drive: 7 plays, 75 yards, 4:13.**
- MIA – Andrew Van Ginkel 25-yard blocked punt return (Jason Sanders kick), 8:25. Dolphins 21–10.
- CHI – Darnell Mooney 16-yard pass from Justin Fields (Cairo Santos kick), 1:53. Dolphins 21–17. **Drive: 12 plays, 75 yards, 6:32.**

**Third quarter**

- MIA – Jaylen Waddle 18-yard pass from Tua Tagovailoa (Jason Sanders kick), 12:47. Dolphins 28–17. **Drive: 4 plays, 75 yards, 2:13.**
- CHI – Justin Fields 61-yard run (Trevon Wesco–Justin Fields pass), 11:20. Dolphins 28–25. **Drive: 3 plays, 66 yards, 1:27.**
- MIA – Jeff Wilson 10-yard pass from Tua Tagovailoa (Jason Sanders kick), 6:02. Dolphins 35–25. **Drive: 11 plays, 75 yards, 5:18.**

**Fourth quarter**

- CHI – Cole Kmet 4-yard pass from Justin Fields (Cairo Santos kick), 11:38. Dolphins 35–32. **Drive: 10 plays, 65 yards, 5:24.**

**Top passers**

- MIA – Tua Tagovailoa – 21/30, 302 yards, 3 TD
- CHI – Justin Fields – 17/28, 123 yards, 3 TD

**Top rushers**

- MIA – Jeff Wilson – 9 rushes, 51 yards
- CHI – Justin Fields – 15 rushes, 178 yards, TD

**Top receivers**

- MIA – Tyreek Hill – 7 receptions, 143 yards, TD
- CHI – Darnell Mooney – 7 receptions, 43 yards, TD

With the win, the Dolphins improved to 6–3.

==== Week 10: vs. Cleveland Browns ====
Week 10: Cleveland Browns at Miami Dolphins – Game summary

Quarter	1	2	3	4	Total
Browns	7	0	3	7	**17**
**Dolphins**	7	10	13	9	**39**

at Hard Rock Stadium, Miami Gardens, Florida

- Date: November 13
- Game time: 1:00 p.m. EST
- Game weather: Mostly sunny, 85 °F (29 °C)
- Game attendance: 66,563
- Referee: Shawn Hochuli
- TV announcers (CBS): Greg Gumbel, Adam Archuleta and AJ Ross
- Recap, Game Book

Game information

**First quarter**

- CLE – Harrison Bryant 1-yard pass from Jacoby Brissett (Cade York kick), 12:13. Browns 7–0. **Drive: 4 plays, 53 yards, 2:47.**
- MIA – Alec Ingold 13-yard pass from Tua Tagovailoa (Jason Sanders kick), 6:13. Tied 7–7. **Drive: 10 plays, 84 yards, 6:00.**

**Second quarter**

- MIA – Jason Sanders 39-yard field goal, 11:05. Dolphins 10–7. **Drive: 9 plays, 50 yards, 4:08.**
- MIA – Trent Sherfield 13-yard pass from Tua Tagovailoa (Jason Sanders kick), 0:32. Dolphins 17–7. **Drive: 7 plays, 53 yards, 0:50.**

**Third quarter**

- MIA – Raheem Mostert 24-yard run (Jason Sanders kick), 11:35. Dolphins 24–7. **Drive: 6 plays, 70 yards, 3:25.**
- CLE – Cade York 37-yard field goal, 6:56. Dolphins 24–10. **Drive: 11 plays, 56 yards, 4:39.**
- MIA – Tyreek Hill 2-yard pass from Tua Tagovailoa (kick failed), 0:37. Dolphins 30–10. **Drive: 13 plays, 77 yards, 6:19.**

**Fourth quarter**

- CLE – Nick Chubb 33-yard run (Cade York kick), 13:09. Dolphins 30–17. **Drive: 7 plays, 76 yards, 2:28.**
- MIA – Jason Sanders 33-yard field goal, 8:15. Dolphins 33–17. **Drive: 4 plays, 53 yards, 2:47.**
- MIA – Jeff Wilson 20-yard run (kick failed), 7:07. Dolphins 39–17. **Drive: 1 play, 20 yards, 0:06.**

**Top passers**

- CLE – Jacoby Brissett – 22/35, 212 yards, TD
- MIA – Tua Tagovailoa – 25/32, 285 yards, 3 TD

**Top rushers**

- CLE – Nick Chubb – 11 rushes, 63 yards, TD
- MIA – Jeff Wilson – 17 rushes, 119 yards, TD

**Top receivers**

- CLE – Donovan Peoples-Jones – 5 receptions, 99 yards
- MIA – Jaylen Waddle – 4 receptions, 66 yards

This was the Dolphins' first game since 2003 where they didn't record a punt. It was also Cleveland quarterback Jacoby Brissett's first return to Hard Rock Stadium since last season. Brissett played for the Dolphins in 2021, where he started 5 games and recorded a 2–3 record as Miami's starter that year. Head coach Mike McDaniel also faced the Browns for the first time in 8 years, previously serving as Cleveland's wide receivers' coach under then-head coach Mike Pettine during the 2014 season. McDaniel revealed on September 23, 2022, that he used clips of NBA Hall of Famer Allen Iverson to guide his receivers during his lone season in Cleveland. It would also mark the first time since 2009 that the Dolphins scored over 30 points in 3 straight games. With the win, the Dolphins improved to 7–3, their best start within 10 games since the 2001 season.

==== Week 12: vs. Houston Texans ====
Week 12: Houston Texans at Miami Dolphins – Game summary

Quarter	1	2	3	4	Total
Texans	0	0	6	9	**15**
**Dolphins**	10	20	0	0	**30**

at Hard Rock Stadium, Miami Gardens, Florida

- Date: November 27
- Game time: 1:00 p.m. EST
- Game weather: Partly cloudy, 87 °F (31 °C)
- Game attendance: 66,205
- Referee: Jerome Boger
- TV announcers (CBS): Spero Dedes, Jay Feely and Aditi Kinkhabwala
- Recap, Game Book

Game information

**First quarter**

- MIA – Jason Sanders 45-yard field goal, 10:21. Dolphins 3–0. **Drive: 9 plays, 39 yards, 3:01.**
- MIA – Durham Smythe 4-yard pass from Tua Tagovailoa (Jason Sanders kick), 2:57. Dolphins 10–0. **Drive: 8 plays, 59 yards, 4:44.**

**Second quarter**

- MIA – Jeff Wilson 3-yard run (Jason Sanders kick), 12:22. Dolphins 17–0. **Drive: 1 play, 3 yards, 0:05.**
- MIA – Jason Sanders 23-yard field goal, 6:22. Dolphins 20–0. **Drive: 10 plays, 72 yards, 4:32.**
- MIA – Xavien Howard 16-yard fumble return (Jason Sanders kick), 4:59. Dolphins 27–0.
- MIA – Jason Sanders 35-yard field goal, 0:00. Dolphins 30–0. **Drive: 11 plays, 71 yards, 1:52.**

**Third quarter**

- HOU – Dare Ogunbowale 3-yard run (run failed), 10:21. Dolphins 30–6. **Drive: 6 plays, 64 yards, 3:10.**

**Fourth quarter**

- HOU – Jordan Akins 25-yard pass from Kyle Allen (pass failed), 12:46. Dolphins 30–12. **Drive: 6 plays, 50 yards, 2:25.**
- HOU – Kaʻimi Fairbairn 28-yard field goal, 9:00. Dolphins 30–15. **Drive: 8 plays, 57 yards, 2:47.**

**Top passers**

- HOU – Kyle Allen – 26/39, 215 yards, TD, 2 INT
- MIA – Tua Tagovailoa – 22/36, 299 yards, TD

**Top rushers**

- HOU – Dare Ogunbowale – 4 rushes, 14 yards, TD
- MIA – Jeff Wilson – 13 rushes, 39 yards, TD

**Top receivers**

- HOU – Jordan Akins – 5 receptions, 61 yards, TD
- MIA – Tyreek Hill – 6 receptions, 85 yards

With the win, the Dolphins improved to 8–3.

==== Week 13: at San Francisco 49ers ====
Week 13: Miami Dolphins at San Francisco 49ers – Game summary

Quarter	1	2	3	4	Total
Dolphins	7	3	0	7	**17**
**49ers**	10	7	6	10	**33**

at Levi's Stadium, Santa Clara, California

- Date: December 4
- Game time: 4:05 p.m. EST/1:05 p.m. PST
- Game weather: Cloudy, 58 °F (14 °C)
- Game attendance: 71,732
- Referee: Tra Blake
- TV announcers (Fox): Joe Davis, Daryl Johnston and Pam Oliver
- Recap, Game Book

Game information

**First quarter**

- MIA – Trent Sherfield 75-yard pass from Tua Tagovailoa (Jason Sanders kick), 14:50. Dolphins 7–0. **Drive: 1 play, 75 yards, 0:10.**
- SF – Robbie Gould 47-yard field goal, 10:37. Dolphins 7–3. **Drive: 9 plays, 54 yards, 4:13.**
- SF – Kyle Juszczyk 3-yard pass from Brock Purdy (Robbie Gould kick), 4:52. 49ers 10–7. **Drive: 9 plays, 54 yards, 4:38.**

**Second quarter**

- MIA – Jason Sanders 43-yard field goal, 10:14. Tied 10–10. **Drive: 12 plays, 65 yards, 5:37.**
- SF – Christian McCaffrey 3-yard pass from Brock Purdy (Robbie Gould kick), 0:04. 49ers 17–10. **Drive: 11 plays, 76 yards, 2:44.**

**Third quarter**

- SF – Robbie Gould 43-yard field goal, 2:52. 49ers 20–10. **Drive: 12 plays, 39 yards, 7:09.**
- SF – Robbie Gould 36-yard field goal, 1:14. 49ers 23–10. **Drive: 4 plays, 7 yards, 1:31.**

**Fourth quarter**

- MIA – Tyreek Hill 45-yard pass from Tua Tagovailoa (Jason Sanders kick), 14:28. 49ers 23–17. **Drive: 10 plays, 34 yards, 3:57.**
- SF – Robbie Gould 48-yard field goal, 2:03. 49ers 26–17. **Drive: 10 plays, 34 yards, 3:57.**
- SF – Dre Greenlaw 23-yard fumble return (Robbie Gould kick), 1:53. 49ers 33–17.

**Top passers**

- MIA – Tua Tagovailoa – 18/33, 295 yards, 2 TD, 2 INT
- SF – Brock Purdy – 25/37, 210 yards, 2 TD, INT

**Top rushers**

- MIA – Raheem Mostert – 7 rushes, 30 yards
- SF – Christian McCaffrey – 17 rushes, 66 yards

**Top receivers**

- MIA – Tyreek Hill – 9 receptions, 146 yards, TD
- SF – Christian McCaffrey – 8 receptions, 80 yards, TD

This was head coach Mike McDaniel's first return to Levi's Stadium since leaving the Niners to become the Dolphins head coach in February 2022. McDaniel previously served as the offensive and run game coordinator for San Francisco under head coach Kyle Shanahan from 2017 to 2021, appearing in Super Bowl LIV in 2020. It was also Dolphins running backs Raheem Mostert and Jeff Wilson's first returns to Levi's Stadium. This game was also the last with Jimmy Garoppolo in a 49ers uniform as he suffered a season-ending foot injury early in the first quarter. San Francisco's 3rd string quarterback and Mr. Irrelevant of the 2022 NFL draft Brock Purdy took over for the remainder of the game, surprisingly leading the 49ers to a 33–17 win over the Dolphins. Purdy would go on to lead the Niners to their third NFC Championship Game in four seasons, while Garoppolo would go on to sign with the Las Vegas Raiders as a free agent three months later. With the loss, the Dolphins fell to 8–4 and snapped a 5-game winning streak.

==== Week 14: at Los Angeles Chargers ====
Week 14: Miami Dolphins at Los Angeles Chargers – Game summary

Quarter	1	2	3	4	Total
Dolphins	0	7	7	3	**17**
**Chargers**	0	17	3	3	**23**

at SoFi Stadium, Inglewood, California

- Date: December 11
- Game time: 8:20 p.m. EST/5:20 p.m. PST
- Game weather: 53 °F (12 °C)
- Game attendance: 70,240
- Referee: Scott Novak
- TV announcers (NBC): Mike Tirico, Cris Collinsworth and Melissa Stark
- Recap, Game Book

Game information

**First quarter**

- No scoring plays.

**Second quarter**

- LAC – Cameron Dicker 33-yard field goal, 14:14. Chargers 3–0. **Drive: 8 plays, 42 yards, 3:22.**
- LAC – Mike Williams 10-yard pass from Justin Herbert (Cameron Dicker kick), 9:49. Chargers 10–0. **Drive: 5 plays, 43 yards, 2:52.**
- MIA – Tyreek Hill 57-yard fumble recovery (Jason Sanders kick), 8:45. Chargers 10–7. **Drive: 3 play, 75 yards, 1:04.**
- LAC – Austin Ekeler 1-yard run (Cameron Dicker kick), 0:18. Chargers 17–7. **Drive: 13 plays, 90 yards, 3:45.**

**Third quarter**

- MIA – Tyreek Hill 60-yard pass from Tua Tagovailoa (Jason Sanders kick), 6:23. Chargers 17–14. **Drive: 5 play, 76 yards, 2:42.**
- LAC – Cameron Dicker 31-yard field goal, 4:18. Chargers 20–14. **Drive: 6 plays, 62 yards, 2:05.**

**Fourth quarter**

- LAC – Cameron Dicker 28-yard field goal, 2:40. Chargers 23–14. **Drive: 17 plays, 79 yards, 8:39.**
- MIA – Jason Sanders 55-yard field goal, 1:10. Chargers 23–17. **Drive: 7 plays, 38 yards, 1:30.**

**Top passers**

- MIA – Tua Tagovailoa – 10/28, 145 yards, TD
- LAC – Justin Herbert – 39/51, 367 yards, TD

**Top rushers**

- MIA – Raheem Mostert – 11 rushes, 37 yards
- LAC – Austin Ekeler – 15 rushes, 45 yards, TD

**Top receivers**

- MIA – Tyreek Hill – 10 receptions, 81 yards, TD
- LAC – Mike Williams – 6 receptions, 116 yards, TD

==== Week 15: at Buffalo Bills ====
Week 15: Miami Dolphins at Buffalo Bills – Game summary

Quarter	1	2	3	4	Total
Dolphins	3	10	13	3	**29**
**Bills**	7	14	0	11	**32**

at Highmark Stadium, Orchard Park, New York

- Date: December 17
- Game time: 8:15 p.m. EST
- Game weather: Cloudy, 30 °F (−1 °C)
- Game attendance: 70,794
- Referee: Bill Vinovich
- TV announcers (NFLN): Kevin Kugler, Mark Sanchez, Laura Okmin and Peter Schrager
- Recap, Game Book

Game information

**First quarter**

- MIA – Jason Sanders 39-yard field goal, 2:59. Dolphins 3–0. **Drive: 14 plays, 52 yards, 7:45.**
- BUF – Quintin Morris 14-yard pass from Josh Allen (Tyler Bass kick), 1:05. Bills 7–3. **Drive: 4 plays, 75 yards, 1:54.**

**Second quarter**

- MIA – Jason Sanders 21-yard field goal, 14:47. Bills 7–6. **Drive: 5 plays, 72 yards, 1:18.**
- BUF – Nyheim Hines 10-yard pass from Josh Allen (Tyler Bass kick), 8:18. Bills 14–6. **Drive: 12 plays, 75 yards, 6:29.**
- MIA – Salvon Ahmed 11-yard run (Jason Sanders kick), 2:59. Bills 14–13. **Drive: 10 plays, 75 yards, 5:19.**
- BUF – James Cook 4-yard pass from Josh Allen (Tyler Bass kick), 0:00. Bills 21–13. **Drive: 12 plays, 82 yards, 2:59.**

**Third quarter**

- MIA – Jaylen Waddle 67-yard pass from Tua Tagovailoa (pass failed), 12:48. Bills 21–19. **Drive: 3 plays, 73 yards, 0:51.**
- MIA – Tyreek Hill 20-yard pass from Tua Tagovailoa (Jason Sanders kick), 2:30. Dolphins 26–21. **Drive: 6 plays, 50 yards, 2:59.**

**Fourth quarter**

- MIA – Jason Sanders 47-yard field goal, 11:56. Dolphins 29–21. **Drive: 5 plays, 18 yards, 2:43.**
- BUF – Dawson Knox 5-yard pass from Josh Allen (Josh Allen run), 9:02. Tied 29–29. **Drive: 7 plays, 75 yards, 2:54.**
- BUF – Tyler Bass 25-yard field goal, 0:00. Bills 32–29. **Drive: 15 plays, 86 yards, 5:56.**

**Top passers**

- MIA – Tua Tagovailoa – 17/30, 234 yards, 2 TD
- BUF – Josh Allen – 25/40, 304 yards, 4 TD

**Top rushers**

- MIA – Raheem Mostert – 17 rushes, 136 yards
- BUF – Josh Allen – 10 rushes, 77 yards

**Top receivers**

- MIA – Jaylen Waddle – 3 receptions, 114 yards, TD
- BUF – Dawson Knox – 6 receptions, 98 yards, TD

==== Week 16: vs. Green Bay Packers ====
Christmas Day games

Week 16: Green Bay Packers at Miami Dolphins – Game summary

Quarter	1	2	3	4	Total
**Packers**	10	3	7	6	**26**
Dolphins	10	10	0	0	**20**

at Hard Rock Stadium, Miami Gardens, Florida

- Date: December 25
- Game time: 1:00 p.m. EST
- Game weather: 46 °F (8 °C)
- Game attendance: 66,328
- Referee: Land Clark
- TV announcers (Fox): Joe Davis, Daryl Johnston and Pam Oliver
- Recap, Game Book

Game information

**First quarter**

- MIA – Jason Sanders 40-yard field goal, 11:10. Dolphins 3–0. **Drive: 8 plays, 52 yards, 3:50.**
- GB – Mason Crosby 36-yard field goal, 9:26. Tied 3–3. **Drive: 4 plays, 9 yards, 1:44.**
- MIA – Jaylen Waddle 84-yard pass from Tua Tagovailoa (Jason Sanders kick), 9:08. Dolphins 10–3. **Drive: 1 play, 84 yards, 0:18.**
- GB – Marcedes Lewis 1-yard pass from Aaron Rodgers (Mason Crosby kick), 4:10. Tied 10–10. **Drive: 10 plays, 54 yards, 4:58.**

**Second quarter**

- MIA – Jeff Wilson 1-yard run (Jason Sanders kick), 10:52. Dolphins 17–10. **Drive: 3 plays, 62 yards, 2:33.**
- MIA – Jason Sanders 34-yard field goal, 4:18. Dolphins 20–10. **Drive: 7 plays, 4 yards, 4:59.**
- GB – Mason Crosby 46-yard field goal, 0:02. Dolphins 20–13. **Drive: 8 plays, 21 yards, 1:53.**

**Third quarter**

- GB – A. J. Dillon 1-yard run (Mason Crosby kick), 7:53. Tied 20–20. **Drive: 11 plays, 78 yards, 7:07.**

**Fourth quarter**

- GB – Mason Crosby 28-yard field goal, 11:45. Packers 23–20. **Drive: 6 plays, 4 yards, 2:14.**
- GB – Mason Crosby 26-yard field goal, 2:02. Packers 26–20. **Drive: 9 plays, 56 yards, 4:00.**

**Top passers**

- GB – Aaron Rodgers – 24/38, 238 yards, TD, INT
- MIA – Tua Tagovailoa – 16/25, 310 yards, TD, 3 INT

**Top rushers**

- GB – A. J. Dillon – 11 rushes, 36 yards, TD
- MIA – Raheem Mostert – 8 rushes, 45 yards

**Top receivers**

- GB – Allen Lazard – 5 receptions, 61 yards
- MIA – Jaylen Waddle – 6 receptions, 143 yards, TD

Despite Miami taking a 20–13 halftime lead, the Packers came back and won due to 13 unanswered 2nd-half points and suddenly sloppy play from Tagovailoa during the second half, who was later revealed to have suffered another concussion right before halftime.

==== Week 17: at New England Patriots ====
Week 17: Miami Dolphins at New England Patriots – Game summary

Quarter	1	2	3	4	Total
Dolphins	0	7	7	7	**21**
**Patriots**	7	0	9	7	**23**

at Gillette Stadium, Foxborough, Massachusetts

- Date: January 1
- Game time: 1:00 p.m. EST
- Game weather: Partly cloudy, 51 °F (11 °C)
- Game attendance: 65,878
- Referee: Brad Allen
- TV announcers (CBS): Ian Eagle, Charles Davis and Evan Washburn
- Recap, Game Book

Game information

**First quarter**

- NE – Tyquan Thornton 7-yard pass from Mac Jones (Nick Folk kick), 7:15. Patriots 7–0. **Drive: 10 plays, 81 yards, 4:18.**

**Second quarter**

- MIA – Tyreek Hill 2-yard run (Jason Sanders kick), 14:55. Tied 7–7. **Drive: 13 plays, 75 yards, 7:20.**

**Third quarter**

- MIA – Raheem Mostert 2-yard pass from Teddy Bridgewater (Jason Sanders kick), 9:17. Dolphins 14–7. **Drive: 5 plays, 41 yards, 2:45.**
- NE – Nick Folk 49-yard field goal, 4:03. Dolphins 14–10. **Drive: 9 plays, 51 yards, 5:14.**
- NE – Kyle Dugger 39-yard interception return (kick failed), 2:51. Patriots 16–14.

**Fourth quarter**

- NE – Jakobi Meyers 1-yard pass from Mac Jones (Nick Folk kick), 4:37. Patriots 23–14. **Drive: 11 plays, 89 yards, 5:06.**
- MIA – Mike Gesicki 4-yard pass from Skylar Thompson (Jason Sanders kick), 1:04. Patriots 23–21. **Drive: 9 plays, 61 yards, 1:28.**

**Top passers**

- MIA – Skylar Thompson – 12/21, 104 yards, TD, INT
- NE – Mac Jones – 20/33, 203 yards, 2 TD

**Top rushers**

- MIA – Jeff Wilson – 15 rushes, 45 yards
- NE – Rhamondre Stevenson – 8 rushes, 42 yards

**Top receivers**

- MIA – Raheem Mostert – 8 receptions, 62 yards, TD
- NE – Tyquan Thornton – 3 receptions, 60 yards, TD

==== Week 18: vs. New York Jets ====
Week 18: New York Jets at Miami Dolphins – Game summary

Quarter	1	2	3	4	Total
Jets	0	3	0	3	**6**
**Dolphins**	0	3	3	5	**11**

at Hard Rock Stadium, Miami Gardens, Florida

- Date: January 8
- Game time: 1:00 p.m. EST
- Game weather: 78 °F (26 °C)
- Game attendance: 66,429
- Referee: John Hussey
- TV announcers (Fox): Joe Davis, Daryl Johnston and Pam Oliver
- Recap, Game Book

Game information

**First quarter**

- No scoring plays

**Second quarter**

- MIA – Jason Sanders 37-yard field goal, 5:17. Dolphins 3–0. **Drive: 10 plays, 36 yards, 5:31.**
- NYJ – Greg Zuerlein 32-yard field goal, 1:35. Tied 3–3. **Drive: 11 plays, 61 yards, 3:42.**

**Third quarter**

- MIA – Jason Sanders 37-yard field goal, 5:18. Dolphins 6–3. **Drive: 15 plays, 72 yards, 8:12.**

**Fourth quarter**

- MYJ – Greg Zuerlein 35-yard field goal, 11:59. Tied 6–6. **Drive: 14 plays, 58 yards, 8:19.**
- MIA – Jason Sanders 50-yard field goal, 0:18. Dolphins 9–6. **Drive: 8 plays, 36 yards, 2:43.**
- MIA – Elijah Moore safety, 0:00. Dolphins 11–6.

**Top passers**

- NYJ – Joe Flacco – 18/33, 149 yards
- MIA – Skylar Thompson – 20/31, 152 yards

**Top rushers**

- NYJ – Zonovan Knight – 12 rushes, 22 yards
- MIA – Jeff Wilson – 16 rushes, 72 yards

**Top receivers**

- NYJ – Garrett Wilson – 9 receptions, 89 yards
- MIA – Mike Gesicki – 4 receptions, 46 yards

=== Standings ===
==== Division ====
AFC East
	W	L	T	PCT	DIV	CONF	PF	PA	STK
^{(2)} Buffalo Bills	13	3	0	.813	4–2	9–2	455	286	W7
^{(7)} Miami Dolphins	9	8	0	.529	3–3	7–5	397	399	W1
New England Patriots	8	9	0	.471	3–3	6–6	364	347	L1
New York Jets	7	10	0	.412	2–4	5–7	296	316	L6

==== Conference ====
AFC
#	Team	Division	W	L	T	PCT	DIV	CONF	SOS	SOV	STK
**Division leaders**
1	Kansas City Chiefs	West	14	3	0	.824	6–0	9–3	.453	.422	W5
2	Buffalo Bills	East	13	3	0	.813	4–2	9–2	.489	.471	W7
3	Cincinnati Bengals	North	12	4	0	.750	3–3	8–3	.507	.490	W8
4	Jacksonville Jaguars	South	9	8	0	.529	4–2	8–4	.467	.438	W5
**Wild cards**
5 (Note: LA Chargers claimed the No. 5 seed over Baltimore based on conference record (7–5 vs. 6–6).)	Los Angeles Chargers	West	10	7	0	.588	2–4	7–5	.443	.341	L1
6	Baltimore Ravens	North	10	7	0	.588	3–3	6–6	.509	.456	L2
7 (Note: Miami finished ahead of Pittsburgh based on head-to-head victory, claiming the 7th and final playoff spot.)	Miami Dolphins	East	9	8	0	.529	3–3	7–5	.537	.457	W1
**Did not qualify for the postseason**
8	Pittsburgh Steelers	North	9	8	0	.529	3–3	5–7	.519	.451	W4
9	New England Patriots	East	8	9	0	.471	3–3	6–6	.502	.415	L1
10 (Note: NY Jets and Tennessee finished ahead of Cleveland based on conference record (5–7 vs. 4–8).) (Note: NY Jets finished ahead of Tennessee based on common record (3–3 vs. 2–4 against: Buffalo, Cincinnati, Denver, Green Bay, Jacksonville).)	New York Jets	East	7	10	0	.412	2–4	5–7	.538	.458	L6
11	Tennessee Titans	South	7	10	0	.412	3–3	5–7	.509	.336	L7
12	Cleveland Browns	North	7	10	0	.412	3–3	4–8	.524	.492	L1
13	Las Vegas Raiders	West	6	11	0	.353	3–3	5–7	.474	.397	L3
14	Denver Broncos	West	5	12	0	.294	1–5	3–9	.481	.465	W1
15	Indianapolis Colts	South	4	12	1	.265	1–4–1	4–7–1	.512	.500	L7
16	Houston Texans	South	3	13	1	.206	3–2–1	3–8–1	.481	.402	W1
**Tiebreakers** (Note: When breaking ties for three or more teams under the NFL's rules, they are first broken within divisions, then comparing only the highest ranked remaining team from each division.)

== Postseason ==
=== Schedule ===
Round	Date	Opponent (seed)	Result	Record	Venue	Recap
Wild Card	January 15	at Buffalo Bills (2)	L 31–34	0–1	Highmark Stadium	Recap

=== Game summaries ===
==== AFC Wild Card Playoffs: at (2) Buffalo Bills ====
AFC Wild Card Playoffs: (7) Miami Dolphins at (2) Buffalo Bills – Game summary

Quarter	1	2	3	4	Total
Dolphins	0	17	7	7	31
Bills	14	6	14	0	34

at Highmark Stadium, Orchard Park, New York

- Date: January 15, 2023
- Game time: 1:00 p.m. EST
- Game weather: Sunny, 28 °F (−2 °C)
- Game attendance: 70,651
- Referee: Brad Allen
- TV announcers (CBS): Jim Nantz, Tony Romo, Tracy Wolfson, and Jay Feely
- Recap, Game Book

Game information

First quarter

- BUF – Dawson Knox 6-yard pass from Josh Allen (Tyler Bass kick), 7:57. Bills 7–0. Drive: 5 plays, 73 yards, 3:00.
- BUF – James Cook 12-yard rush (Tyler Bass kick), 5:07. Bills 14–0. Drive: 4 plays, 23 yards, 2:13.

Second quarter

- BUF – Tyler Bass 33 yard field goal, 12:46. Bills 17–0. Drive: 11 plays, 52 yards, 4:51.
- MIA – Jason Sanders 40 yard field goal, 7:34. Bills 17–3. Drive: 10 plays, 38 yards, 5:12.
- MIA – Jason Sanders 48-yard field goal, 2:15. Bills 17–6. Drive: 8 plays, 18 yards, 3:46.
- MIA – Jason Sanders 37-yard field goal, 1:15. Bills 17–9. Drive: 4 plays, 8 yards, 0:17.
- MIA – Mike Gesicki 7-yard pass from Skylar Thompson (Skylar Thompson-Tyreek Hill pass), 0:33. Tied 17–17. Drive: 4 plays, 18 yards, 0:20.
- BUF – Tyler Bass 39-yard field goal, 0:04. Bills 20–17. Drive: 6 plays, 54 yards, 0:29.

Third quarter

- MIA – Zach Sieler 5-yard fumble return (Jason Sanders kick), 13:59. Dolphins 24–20. Drive: 1 play, -18 yards, 0:08.
- BUF – Cole Beasley 6-yard pass from Josh Allen (Tyler Bass kick), 5:18. Bills 27–24. Drive: 5 plays, 33 yards, 2:11.
- BUF – Gabe Davis 23-yard pass from Josh Allen (Tyler Bass kick), 2:07. Bills 34–24. Drive: 5 plays, 68 yards, 2:07.

Fourth quarter

- MIA – Jeff Wilson Jr. 1-yard rush (Jason Sanders kick), 5:07. Bills 34–31. Drive: 11 plays, 75 yards, 6:14.

Top passers

- MIA – Skylar Thompson – 18/45, 220 yards, 1 TD, 2 INT
- BUF – Josh Allen – 23/39, 352 yards, 3 TD, 2 INT

Top rushers

- MIA – Jeff Wilson Jr. – 10 rushes, 23 yards, 1 TD
- BUF – Devin Singletary – 10 rushes, 48 yards

Top receivers

- MIA – Tyreek Hill – 7 receptions, 69 yards
- BUF – Stefon Diggs – 7 receptions, 114 yards

== Statistics ==
=== Team ===
Category	Total yards	Yards per game	NFL rank (out of 32)
Passing offense	4,511	265.4	4th
Rushing offense	1,686	99.2	25th
Total offense	6,197	364.5	6th
Passing defense	3,992	234.8	27th
Rushing defense	1,751	103.0	4th
Total defense	5,743	337.8	18th

=== Individual ===
Category	Player	Total
Offense
Passing	Tua Tagovailoa	3,548
Rushing	Raheem Mostert	891
Receiving	Tyreek Hill	1,710
Defense
Tackles (Solo)	Jevon Holland	77
Sacks	Jaelan Phillips	7
Interceptions	Jevon Holland	2

Statistics correct as of the end of the 2022 NFL season

== Awards and honors ==
Recipient	Award(s)
Tua Tagovailoa	Week 2; AFC Offensive Player of the Week
Tua Tagovailoa	Week 8; FedEx Air Player of the Week
Tua Tagovailoa	Week 9; FedEx Air Player of the Week
Melvin Ingram	September; AFC Defensive Player of the Month
