= Jevón Holland =

Canadian gridiron football player (born 2000)

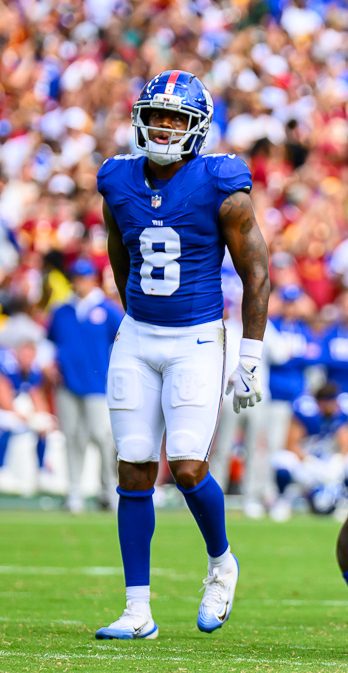
- Holland with the New York Giants in 2025

No. 8 – New York Giants
- Positions: Safety, punt returner
- Roster status: Active

Personal information
- Born: March 3, 2000 (age 26); Coquitlam, British Columbia, Canada
- Listed height: 6 ft 1 in (1.85 m)
- Listed weight: 207 lb (94 kg)

Career information
- High school: Bishop O'Dowd (Oakland, California, U.S.)
- College: Oregon (2018–2020)
- NFL draft: 2021: 2nd round, 36th overall pick

Career history
- Miami Dolphins (2021–2024); New York Giants (2025–present)

Awards and highlights
- PFWA All-Rookie Team (2021)

Career NFL statistics as of Week 10, 2026
- Total tackles: 401
- Sacks: 5.0
- Forced fumbles: 7
- Fumble recoveries: 5
- Pass deflections: 36
- Interceptions: 10
- Defensive touchdowns: 1
- Stats at Pro Football Reference

Jevón Holland (born March 3, 2000) is a Canadian-American professional football safety and punt returner for the New York Giants of the National Football League (NFL). He played college football for the Oregon Ducks, and was selected by the Miami Dolphins in the second round of the 2021 NFL draft.

== Early life ==
Holland was born in Coquitlam, British Columbia, while his father, John Holland, a former defensive back for Sacramento State played and coached in the Canadian Football League. Holland’s family eventually moved to the San Francisco Bay Area in 2008, settling in Pleasanton, California. Holland attended Bishop O'Dowd High School in Oakland, California. He played defensive back and wide receiver in high school. As a senior he had 34 tackles and five interceptions on defense and 35 receptions for 1,012 yards and 12 touchdowns as a receiver. Holland played in the 2018 Polynesian Bowl. He committed to the University of Oregon to play college football.

== College career ==
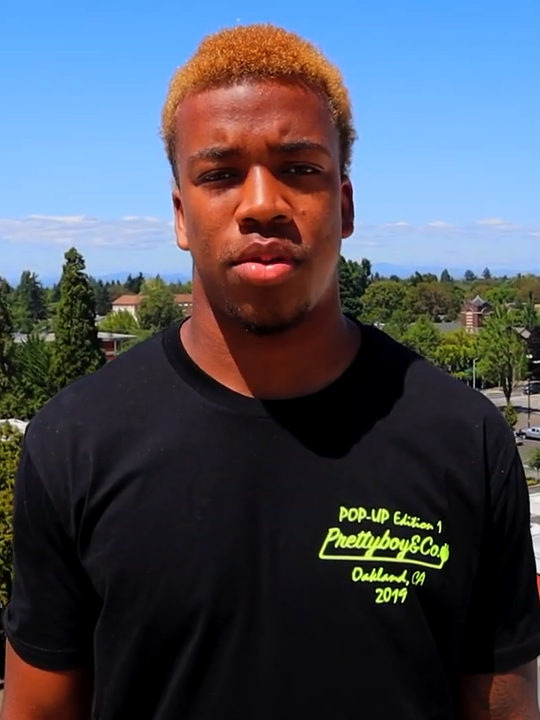
Holland in 2019

As a true freshman at Oregon in 2018, Holland played in 13 games and made two starts. For the season he had 42 tackles and a team-high five interceptions. As a sophomore in 2019, he became a starter and started all 14 games. He again led the team with four interceptions and had 66 tackles and a touchdown.

On September 26, 2020, Holland announced that he opted out of the 2020-21 college football season and declared for the 2021 NFL draft.

== Professional career ==
=== Pre-draft ===
NFL media analyst Daniel Jeremiah had Holland ranked as the second best safety (49th overall) available. Cory Giddings of Bleacher Report also had him listed second amongst all safeties (45th overall) eligible in the draft. Dane Brugler of the Athletic ranked him as the third best among all safety prospects. Scouts Inc. ranked Holland as the fourth best safety prospect (56th overall) in the draft. Michael Renner of Pro Football Focus had Holland listed as the fifth best safety (50th overall) on his big board. NFL draft analysts and scouts projected him to be selected in the second or third round.

External videos
- 2021 Draft Prospects: Jevon Holland
- NFL First Draft: Jevon Holland

Pre-draft measurables
Height	Weight	Arm length	Hand span	Wingspan	40-yard dash	10-yard split	20-yard split	20-yard shuttle	Vertical jump	Broad jump	Bench press
6 ft 0 5/8 in (1.84 m)	207 lb (94 kg)	31 1/2 in (0.80 m)	9 1/8 in (0.23 m)	6 ft 4 5/8 in (1.95 m)	4.47 s	1.55 s	2.61 s	4.16 s	35.5 in (0.90 m)	10 ft 6 in (3.20 m)	19 reps
All values from Pro Day

=== Miami Dolphins ===
==== 2021 ====
The Miami Dolphins selected Holland in the second round (36th overall) of the 2021 NFL draft; he was the first safety selected. Though eligible and ranked as the #3 Canadian prospect, he was not selected in the subsequent 2021 CFL draft. On July 23, 2021, the Miami Dolphins signed Holland to a four-year, $8.76 million contract that includes $6.20 million guaranteed and a signing bonus of $3.69 million.

External videos
- Dolphins select Holland 36th overall
- Jevon Holland: Draft Press Conference

Holland entered training camp as a potential candidate to replace Bobby McCain at free safety and competed against Brandon Jones and Jason McCourty. Defensive coordinator Josh Boyer named Eric Rowe and Jason McCourty as the starting safeties to begin 2021, with Jevon Holland as the primary backup safety.

On September 12, 2021, Holland made his professional regular season debut and recorded two solo tackles in a 17–16 victory at the New England Patriots. The following week, Holland earned his first career start at strong safety and had three combined tackles (two solo) in a 35–0 loss against the Buffalo Bills. Before Week 5, head coach Brian Flores opted to make Holland and Brandon Jones the starting safeties, supplanting Eric Rowe and Jason McCourty. In Week 7, he recorded five solo tackles and made his first career sack on Matt Ryan during a 30–28 loss to the Atlanta Falcons. On November 7, 2021, Holland had two solo tackles, a pass deflection, and his first career interception off a pass by Tyrod Taylor intended for wide receiver Brandin Cooks as the Dolphins defeated the Houston Texans, 17–9. He was inactive as the Dolphins defeated the New York Jets 31–24 in Week 15 due to COVID-19. In Week 17, he racked up a season-high eight combined tackles (seven solo) and made one pass deflection in a 34–3 loss at the Tennessee Titans. He finished his rookie season in 2021 with 69 combined tackles (48 solo), ten pass deflections, 2.5 sacks, and two interceptions in 16 games and 13 starts. He was named to the 2021 PFWA All-Rookie Team. He received an overall grade of 84.7 from Pro Football Focus as a rookie in 2021.

==== 2022 ====
On January 10, 2022, the Miami Dolphins officially fired head coach Brian Flores after a 9–8 record in 2021. On February 6, 2022, the Miami Dolphins announced their decision to hire San Francisco 49ers' offensive coordinator Mike McDaniel as their new head coach. McDaniel retained Josh Boyer as defensive coordinator and also chose to keep Holland and Brandon Jones as the starting safety duo.

On September 11, 2022, Holland started in the season opener and made three solo tackles, deflected a pass, and intercepted a pass by Mac Jones intended for DeVante Parker in a 20–7 victory over the New England Patriots. In Week 8, he collected a season-high 12 combined tackles (10 solo) and one pass deflection as the Dolphins won 31–27 at the Detroit Lions. He finished the 2022 NFL season with a total of 96 combined tackles (77 solo), seven pass deflections, 1.5 sacks, a forced fumble, and two interceptions while starting all 17 games. He received an overall grade of 67.2 from Pro Football Focus, which ranked 10th among all qualifying safeties in 2022.

The Miami Dolphins finished the season second in the AFC East with a 9–8 record and earned a Wildcard berth. On January 19, 2023, Holland started in his first career playoff appearance and recorded ten combined tackles (nine solo), two pass deflections, and intercepted a pass by Josh Allen intended for Cole Beasley to return it 29 yards in the Dolphins' 34–31 loss at the Buffalo Bills in the AFC Wildcard Game.

==== 2023 ====
On January 19, 2023, the Miami Dolphins fired defensive coordinator Josh Boyer. Holland entered training camp as the 'de facto' starting strong safety. New defensive coordinator Vic Fangio named Holland and DeShon Elliott the starting safeties to begin 2023.

On September 10, 2023, Holland started the season opener and racked up a career-high 14 combined tackles (10 solo) in the Dolphins' 36–34 victory at the Los Angeles Chargers. In Week 7, Holland had six combined tackles (five solo), but exited the 31–17 loss at the Philadelphia Eagles after suffering a concussion in an accidental collision with teammate David Long Jr. He remained in concussion protocol and was inactive for Week 8. On November 24, 2023, Holland made five solo tackles, a pass deflection, and intercepted a hail mary pass by Tim Boyle in the last few seconds of the first half to return it 99 yards and score the first touchdown of his career as the Dolphins won 34–13 at the New York Jets. Unfortunately, Holland exited the game in the third quarter and was inactive for the next four games (Weeks 13–16) after suffering MCL sprains in both knees. He finished with 74 combined tackles (52 solo), four pass deflections, three forced fumbles, one fumble recovery, one interception, and a touchdown in 12 games and 12 starts. He received an overall grade of 90.4 from Pro Football Focus in 2023.

The Miami Dolphins finished second in the AFC East with an 11–6 record and earned a Wild card berth. Holland was sidelined for the Dolphins' 26–7 loss at the Kansas City Chiefs in the AFC Wildcard Game due to reaggravating his knee injury.

==== 2024 ====
On January 24, 2024, the Miami Dolphins announced they had agreed to mutually part ways with defensive coordinator Vic Fangio. On February 3, 2024, the Miami Dolphins officially hired Baltimore Ravens' assistant head coach/defensive line coach Anthony Weaver as the defensive coordinator. Head coach Mike McDaniel named Holland the starting free safety, alongside strong safety Jordan Poyer, to start the season.

In Week 5, Holland had five combined tackles (four solo) and a pass deflection in a 15–10 victory at the New England Patriots. He suffered an injury that was discovered to be a broken bone in his left hand during the game and was inactive for Week 7. He made four solo tackles in a Week 8 loss against the Arizona Cardinals and reinjured his left hand during the game, sidelining him for a Week 9 loss at the Buffalo Bills the following week. On January 5, 2025, he collected a season-high seven combined tackles (four solo) and deflected a pass during a 32–20 loss at the New York Jets. He finished the 2024 NFL season with a total of 62 combined tackles (42 solo), four pass deflections, one forced fumble, and one sack in 15 games and 15 starts. He received an overall grade of 63.0 from Pro Football Focus, which ranked 79th among 171 qualifying safeties in 2024.

=== New York Giants ===
On March 13, 2025, the New York Giants signed Holland to a three-year, $45.3 million contract that includes $30.3 million guaranteed, $27.4 million guaranteed upon signing, and an initial signing bonus of $12 million.

Holland was named NFC Defensive Player of the Month for September of the 2026 NFL season after posting three interceptions, two forced fumbles and twelve tackles and four pass breakups.

== NFL career statistics ==
Legend
**Bold**	Career high

=== Regular season ===
Year	Team	Games		Tackles					Interceptions						Fumbles					Punt returns				
Year	Team	GP	GS	Comb	Solo	Ast	Sack	TFL	PD	Int	Yds	Avg	Lng	TD	FF	Fum	FR	Yds	TD	Ret	Yds	Avg	Lng	TD
2021	MIA	16	13	69	48	21	**2.5**	**3**	**10**	**2**	0	0.0	0	0	0	**2**	**3**	3	0	**12**	**92**	**7.7**	**16**	0
2022	MIA	17	17	**96**	**77**	19	1.5	1	7	**2**	64	32.0	33	0	1	1	0	0	0	4	18	4.5	8	0
2023	MIA	12	12	74	52	22	0.0	**3**	4	1	**99**	**99.0**	**99**	**1**	**3**	0	1	**4**	0	0	0	0.0	0	0
2024	MIA	15	15	62	42	20	1.0	2	4	0	0	0.0	0	0	1	0	0	0	0	0	0	0.0	0	0
2025	NYG	14	14	63	38	**25**	0.0	0	5	1	3	3.0	3	0	0	0	0	0	0	2	7	3.5	10	0
2026	NYG	8	8	37	22	15	0.0	3	6	4	0	0.0	0	0	2	0	1	0	0	0	0	0.0	0	0
Career		82	79	401	279	122	5.0	12	36	10	166	16.6	99	1	7	3	5	7	0	18	117	6.5	16	0

=== Postseason ===
Year	Team	Games		Tackles					Interceptions						Fumbles				
Year	Team	GP	GS	Comb	Solo	Ast	Sack	TFL	PD	Int	Yds	Avg	Lng	TD	FF	Fum	FR	Yds	TD
2022	MIA	1	1	10	9	1	0.0	0	2	1	29	29.0	29	0	0	0	0	0	0
Career		1	1	10	9	1	0.0	0	2	1	29	29.0	29	0	0	0	0	0	0
