= Brandon Jones (safety) =

American football player (born 1998)

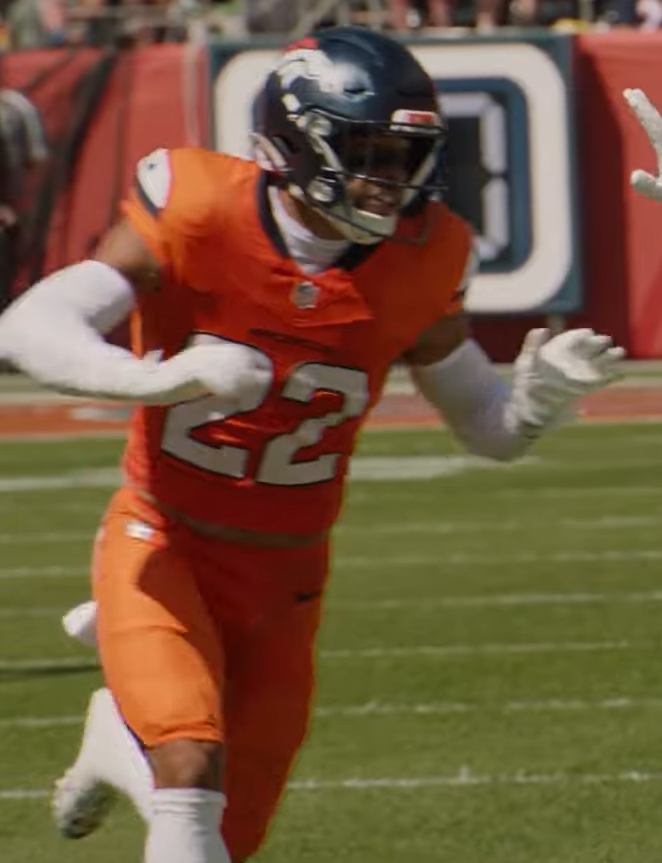
- Jones with the Denver Broncos in 2025

No. 22 – Denver Broncos
- Position: Free safety
- Roster status: Active

Personal information
- Born: April 2, 1998 (age 28); Nacogdoches, Texas, U.S.
- Listed height: 6 ft 0 in (1.83 m)
- Listed weight: 191 lb (87 kg)

Career information
- High school: Nacogdoches
- College: Texas (2016–2019)
- NFL draft: 2020: 3rd round, 70th overall pick

Career history
- Miami Dolphins (2020–2023); Denver Broncos (2024–present)

Awards and highlights
- Second-team All-Big 12 (2019)

Career NFL statistics as of Week 5, 2026
- Total tackles: 466
- Sacks: 8.5
- Forced fumbles: 5
- Fumble recoveries: 6
- Pass deflections: 30
- Interceptions: 9
- Stats at Pro Football Reference

Brandon Jones (born April 2, 1998) is an American professional football free safety for the Denver Broncos of the National Football League (NFL). He played college football for the Texas Longhorns.

== Early life ==
Jones grew up in Nacogdoches, Texas, and attended Nacogdoches High School, where he played football and ran track. As a senior Jones recorded 124 tackles, 16 tackles for loss, two pass breakups and two interceptions and was named the District 16-5A Defensive Player of the Year as well as first-team All-State and the Texas Defensive Player of the Year by USA Today. He was also invited to play in the 2016 Under Armour All-America Game. Jones was a consensus top-five recruit nationally at the safety position (Scout.com listed him as the #1 safety in the nation) and a top 50 prospect for his class. On National Signing Day, Jones committed to play college football at the University of Texas over offers from Alabama, Baylor, LSU, Oregon and Texas A&M.

== College career ==
Jones played in all twelve of Texas' games as a true freshman with one start, making 16 tackles and blocking two punts. He was named a starting safety going into his sophomore season and finished the year with 61 tackles (four for loss), two passes broken up, and a forced fumble. He finished fourth on the team with 70 (5.5 for loss) tackles as a junior while also intercepting two passes, breaking up a pass, and recovering two fumbles despite missing four games due to a recurring ankle injury and was named honorable mention All-Big 12 Conference. Jones originally considered entering the 2019 NFL Draft following the end of the season, but ultimately decided to return to Texas for his senior year.

Jones entered his senior season on the watchlists for the Bronko Nagurski Trophy and the Lott Trophy. He finished his senior season with 86 tackles, 4.5 tackles for loss, in addition to adding two interceptions, a sack, a forced fumble and a fumble recovery and was named second-team All-Big 12. Jones finished his collegiate career with 233 tackles, 14 tackles for loss, one sack, two forced fumbles, three fumble recoveries and two blocked kicks with 11 passes defended and four interceptions in 47 games played.

== Professional career ==
=== Pre-draft ===
Former NFL executive Gil Brandt ranked Jones as the eighth best safety prospect (113th overall) in the draft. Kevin Hanson of Sports Illustrated ranked him as the eighth best safety prospect in the draft. NFL media analyst Daniel Jeremiah had Jones listed eighth (106th overall) among all safeties in the draft. NFL draft analysts projections on Jones varied from as early as the third round to as late as the fifth round in the 2020 NFL draft.

External videos
- ESPN Draft Profile: Brandon Jones

Pre-draft measurables
Height	Weight	Arm length	Hand span	Wingspan
5 ft 11 1/8 in (1.81 m)	198 lb (90 kg)	30 1/8 in (0.77 m)	8 3/4 in (0.22 m)	6 ft 2 1/2 in (1.89 m)
All values from NFL Combine

=== Miami Dolphins ===
The Miami Dolphins selected Jones in the third round (70th overall) of the 2020 NFL draft. He was the seventh safety drafted in 2020. The Miami Dolphins drafted Jones to possibly fill the void at free safety after they traded Minkah Fitzpatrick to the Pittsburgh Steelers the previous season.

External videos
- Dolphins select Brandon Jones No. 70
- Brandon Jones NFL draft press conference

==== 2020 ====
On May 12, 2020, the Miami Dolphins signed Jones to a four-year, $4.87 million contract that included a signing bonus of $1.10 million.

Throughout training camp, Jones competed to be the starting free safety against Bobby McCain and Steven Parker. On August 6, 2020, the Miami Dolphins placed Jones on the reserve/COVID-19 list and reactivated him the following day. Head coach Brian Flores listed Jones as the third free safety on the depth chart to start his rookie season, behind Bobby McCain and backup Kavon Frazier. McCain and Eric Rowe were named the starting safety duo with Jones as the primary fifth defensive back in three safety sets.

On September 13, 2020, Jones earned his first career start in his professional regular season debut in the season opener against the New England Patriots and made nine combined tackles (seven solo) in a 21–13 loss. In Week 12, Jones recorded three combined tackles (two solo) and made his first career sack on Sam Darnold during a 20–3 win at the New York Jets. In Week 14, he collected a season-high tying nine combined tackles (four solo) as the Dolphins lost, 33–27, to the Kansas City Chiefs. He completed his rookie season in 2020 with 62 combined tackles (43 solo), one pass deflection, one sack, and a forced fumble in 16 games and four starts.

==== 2021 ====
Jones entered training camp as a potential candidate to replace Bobby McCain at free safety and competed against Jason McCourty and rookie Jevon Holland. Defensive coordinator Josh Boyer named Eric Rowe and Jason McCourty as the starting safeties to begin 2021, with Jones as a backup and fourth on the depth chart behind Jevon Holland.

On September 26, 2021, Jones made six combined tackles (four solo) and had a career-high two sacks on Derek Carr during a 31–28 loss at the Las Vegas Raiders. Before Week 5, head coach Brian Flores opted to make Jones and Jevon Holland the starting safeties, supplanting Eric Rowe and Jason McCourty. He was inactive for two consecutive games (Weeks 12–13) after injuring his ankle. On December 27, 2021, Jones recorded six combined tackles (two solo), one pass deflection, one sack, and made his first career interception off a pass by Ian Book intended for wide receiver Marquez Callaway in a 20–3 win at the New Orleans Saints in Week 16. In Week 18, he racked up a season-high eight combined tackles (four solo) in the Dolphins' 33–24 loss against the New England Patriots. He finished the season with a total of 79 combined tackles (48 solo), five sacks, two pass deflections, and one interception in 15 games and 13 starts. He received an overall grade of 53.4 from Pro Football Focus.

==== 2022 ====
On January 10, 2022, the Miami Dolphins officially fired head coach Brian Flores after a 9–8 record in 2021. On February 6, 2022, the Miami Dolphins announced their decision to hire San Francisco 49ers' offensive coordinator Mike McDaniel as their new head coach. Defensive coordinator Josh Boyer returned as defensive coordinator under McDaniel and Jones and Jevon Holland remained as the starting safety duo to start the season.

On September 11, 2022, Jones started in the Miami Dolphins' home opener and recorded a season-high 11 combined tackles (six solo), deflected a pass, and had one sack in a 20–7 victory against the New England Patriots. On October 25, 2022, the Miami Dolphins officially placed Jones on injured reserve after suffering a torn ACL in Week 7. He finished the 2022 NFL season with 49 combined tackles (26 solo), three pass deflections, and two sacks in seven games and seven starts at free safety.

==== 2023 ====
On January 19, 2023, the Miami Dolphins fired defensive coordinator Josh Boyer. Throughout training camp, Jones competed against close friend and former college teammate DeShon Elliott for the starting role at free safety. New defensive coordinator Vic Fangio named Jones the primary backup safety, behind starters DeShon Elliott and Jevon Holland to begin 2023.

Jones was inactive for the Dolphins' Week 9 loss at the Kansas City Chiefs due to a concussion. He started four consecutive games (Weeks 13–16) at safety after Jevon Holland was sidelined due to a knee injury. On December 17, 2023, Jones made five solo tackles and had a career-high two interceptions off of Trevor Siemian as the Dolphins routed the New York Jets, 30–0. He finished with 48 combined tackles (36 solo), four pass deflections, two interceptions, and a forced fumble in 16 games and five starts. He received an overall grade of 75.4 from Pro Football Focus, which ranked 17th among all qualifying safeties in 2023.

The Miami Dolphins finished the 2023 NFL season second in the AFC East with an 11–6 record to clinch a Wild Card spot. On January 13, 2024, Jones started in his first career playoff appearance and recorded eight combined tackles (four solo) in a 26–7 loss at the Kansas City Chiefs in the AFC Wildcard Game.

=== Denver Broncos ===
==== 2024 ====
On March 11, 2024, the Denver Broncos signed Jones to a three–year, $20 million contract that includes $11 million guaranteed and a signing bonus of $5.50 million.

Throughout training camp, Jones competed against former Texas Longhorns teammates Caden Sterns and P. J. Locke, as well as JL Skinner for a starting role at safety after the departures of former starters Justin Simmons and Kareem Jackson. Head coach Sean Payton named Jones and P. J. Locke the starting safety tandem to start the regular season.

On September 22, 2024, Jones made six combined tackles (four solo), a pass deflection, and made his first interception with the Denver Broncos after picking off a pass by Baker Mayfield intended for Mike Evans and returned it for a career-best 37 yards in a 26–7 win at the Tampa Bay Buccaneers. In Week 6, he racked up a career-high 11 solo tackles (12 combined) and deflected a pass during a 23–16 loss to the Los Angeles Chargers. He was sidelined for a Week 11 win against the Atlanta Falcons due to an abdominal injury. In Week 15, Jones had nine combined tackles (eight solo), a career-high three pass deflections, and intercepted a pass by Anthony Richardson as the Broncos defeated the Indianapolis Colts, 31–13. On December 28, 2024, he collected a career-high 13 combined tackles (nine solo) in a 30–24 loss at the Cincinnati Bengals. He finished the 2024 NFL season with 115 combined tackles (79 solo), ten pass deflections, three interceptions, one forced fumble, and a fumble recovery in 16 games and 16 starts. He received an overall grade of 86.7 from Pro Football Focus, which ranked fifth among 171 qualifying safeties in 2024.

==== 2025 ====
On December 15, 2025, Jones was placed on injured reserve after suffering a pectoral injury in a Week 15 win against the Green Bay Packers. He finished the regular season with 78 tackles, seven passes defensed, and one interception through 14 games (13 starts). On January 13, 2026, it was reported that Jones had undergone surgery to repair a torn pectoral muscle.

== NFL career statistics ==
Legend
	Led the league
**Bold**	Career high

=== Regular season ===
Year	Team	Games		Tackles					Interceptions						Fumbles				
Year	Team	GP	GS	Cmb	Solo	Ast	Sck	TFL	Int	Yds	Avg	Lng	TD	PD	FF	Fmb	FR	Yds	TD
2020	MIA	16	4	62	41	21	1.0	3	0	0	0.0	0	0	1	**1**	0	0	0	0
2021	MIA	15	13	79	48	31	**5.0**	**6**	1	8	8.0	8	0	1	**1**	**1**	**2**	7	0
2022	MIA	7	7	49	26	23	2.0	1	0	0	0.0	0	0	3	**1**	0	0	0	0
2023	MIA	16	6	48	36	12	0.0	2	2	40	20.0	**40**	0	4	**1**	0	1	0	0
2024	DEN	16	15	**115**	**79**	**36**	0.0	2	**3**	**74**	**24.7**	37	0	**10**	**1**	0	1	**34**	0
2025	DEN	14	13	78	43	35	0.5	0	1	0	0.0	0	0	7	0	0	1	0	0
Career		84	58	431	273	158	8.5	14	7	122	17.4	40	0	26	5	1	5	41	0

=== Postseason ===
Year	Team	Games		Tackles					Interceptions						Fumbles				
Year	Team	GP	GS	Cmb	Solo	Ast	Sck	TFL	Int	Yds	Avg	Lng	TD	PD	FF	Fmb	FR	Yds	TD
2023	MIA	1	1	**8**	4	**4**	0.0	0	0	0	0.0	0	0	0	**1**	0	0	0	0
2024	DEN	1	1	7	**5**	2	0.0	0	0	0	0.0	0	0	0	0	0	0	0	0
Career		2	2	15	9	6	0.0	0	0	0	0.0	0	0	0	1	0	0	0	0
