= Thomas Morstead =

American football player (born 1986)

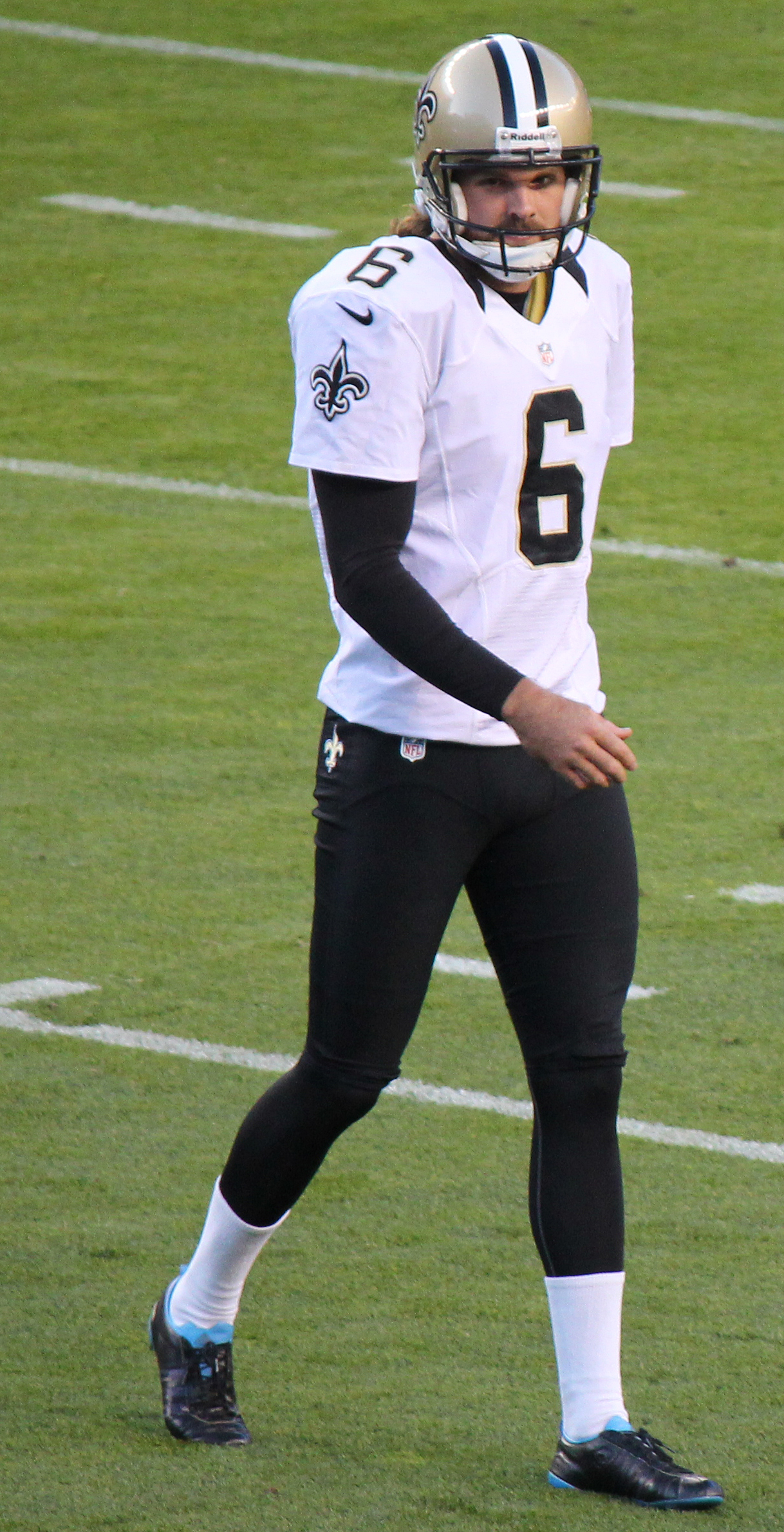
- Morstead with the New Orleans Saints in 2012

No. 13 – Tennessee Titans
- Position: Punter / Kickoff specialist
- Roster status: Active

Personal information
- Born: March 8, 1986 (age 40); Houston, Texas, U.S.
- Listed height: 6 ft 4 in (1.93 m)
- Listed weight: 225 lb (102 kg)

Career information
- High school: Pearland (Pearland, Texas)
- College: SMU (2004–2008)
- NFL draft: 2009: 5th round, 164th overall pick

Career history
- New Orleans Saints (2009–2020); New York Jets (2021); Atlanta Falcons (2021); Miami Dolphins (2022); New York Jets (2023–2024); San Francisco 49ers (2025); Indianapolis Colts (2026)*; Tennessee Titans (2026–present)
- * Offseason or practice squad member only

Awards and highlights
- Super Bowl champion (XLIV); Second-team All-Pro (2012); Pro Bowl (2012); NFL punting yards leader (2023); 2× First-team All-C-USA (2007, 2008)

Career NFL statistics as of Week 10, 2026
- Punts: 1,009
- Punting yards: 47,089
- Punting average: 46.7
- Longest punt: 75
- Inside 20: 376
- Touchbacks: 68
- Stats at Pro Football Reference

Thomas James Morstead (born March 8, 1986) is an American professional football punter and kickoff specialist for the Tennessee Titans of the National Football League (NFL). He played college football for the SMU Mustangs and was selected by the New Orleans Saints in the fifth round of the 2009 NFL draft. Morstead has also played for the New York Jets, Atlanta Falcons, Miami Dolphins, San Francisco 49ers, and Indianapolis Colts.

== Early life ==
Morstead was born in Houston, Texas, and was raised in a nearby suburb of Pearland, Texas. He has one brother, Patrick. Morstead attended Pearland High School and won varsity letters in football and basketball. In football, Morstead received second-team All-District honors and was named the Brazoria County Special Teams MVP as a senior. He was also a member of the National Honor Society, adding Academic All-State honors.

== College career ==
Morstead enrolled at Southern Methodist in 2004, turning down scholarship offers from Texas Christian, Rice, Texas and Missouri, but spent the season as a redshirt. He was a member of the Conference USA's Academic Honor Roll in 2005, but never appeared in a game. Morstead took over place-kicking and punting chores in 2006, earning All-Conference USA third-team honors. He led Conference USA with an average of 43.82 yards on 50 attempts, the best average by an SMU punter since Craig James averaged 44.9 yards in 1982. Morstead made 13 of 18 field goals and 34 of 35 extra points for a total of 73 points. He recorded one solo tackle.

As a sophomore, Morstead was a consensus All-Conference USA first-team pick and also gained league academic honors. He again led C-USA with a 44.65-yard average. Morstead scored 82 points and set the league single-season record by making all 43 extra point attempts, as he also connected on 13 of 20 field goals. Morstead concentrated more on directional punting in 2008. The All-Conference USA honorable mention averaged 41.78 yards on 59 punts. Morstead made 11 of 15 field goals, 29 of 30 extra points, and amassed 62 points.

== Professional career ==
Pre-draft measurables
Height	Weight	Arm length	Hand span	40-yard dash	10-yard split	20-yard split	Bench press
6 ft 4 1/4 in (1.94 m)	225 lb (102 kg)	32 in (0.81 m)	9 in (0.23 m)	4.88 s	1.79 s	2.91 s	19 reps
All values from NFL Combine

=== New Orleans Saints ===
Morstead was selected in the fifth round of the 2009 NFL draft with the 164th overall selection by the New Orleans Saints. He was the second punter chosen in 2009, after Kevin Huber (by the Cincinnati Bengals). Morstead beat out Glenn Pakulak for the Saints' punting job in 2009. As a rookie, he recorded 58 punts for a 43.59 average. Morstead played a role in the Saints' victory over the Indianapolis Colts in Super Bowl XLIV by executing an onside kick during the second half kickoff. The Saints recovered the ball and were able to convert that possession into a touchdown and a 13–10 lead. The Saints eventually won the game 31–17. He was the last active player from the Saints Super Bowl XLIV roster. After the game, Morstead stated that while he was excited about executing the play, Morstead was also terrified knowing that if the play was not executed perfectly, the Colts would have likely recovered the ball with a shot of extending their 10–6 lead.

In the 2010 season, Morstead had 57 punts for 2,618 yards and a 45.93 average.

Morstead currently holds the record for most kickoff touchbacks in one game with nine, which he set in a 62–7 victory over the Colts on October 23, 2011. He also holds the record for the most touchbacks in a single season, with 68 in 2011. Morstead finished the 2011 season with 46 punts for 2,224 yards and a 48.35 average.

In July 2012, the Saints signed Morstead to a six-year extension stated to be worth $21.9 million, making him the second highest paid punter in the league (after Shane Lechler of the Oakland Raiders). He went on to have an outstanding season, leading the league (with a record-setting pace through 15 games) in net punting yardage, and was elected to the Pro Bowl. He had 74 punts for 3,707 yards and a 50.09 average in the 2012 season.

In the 2013 season, Morstead finished with 61 punts for 2,859 yards and a 46.87 average.

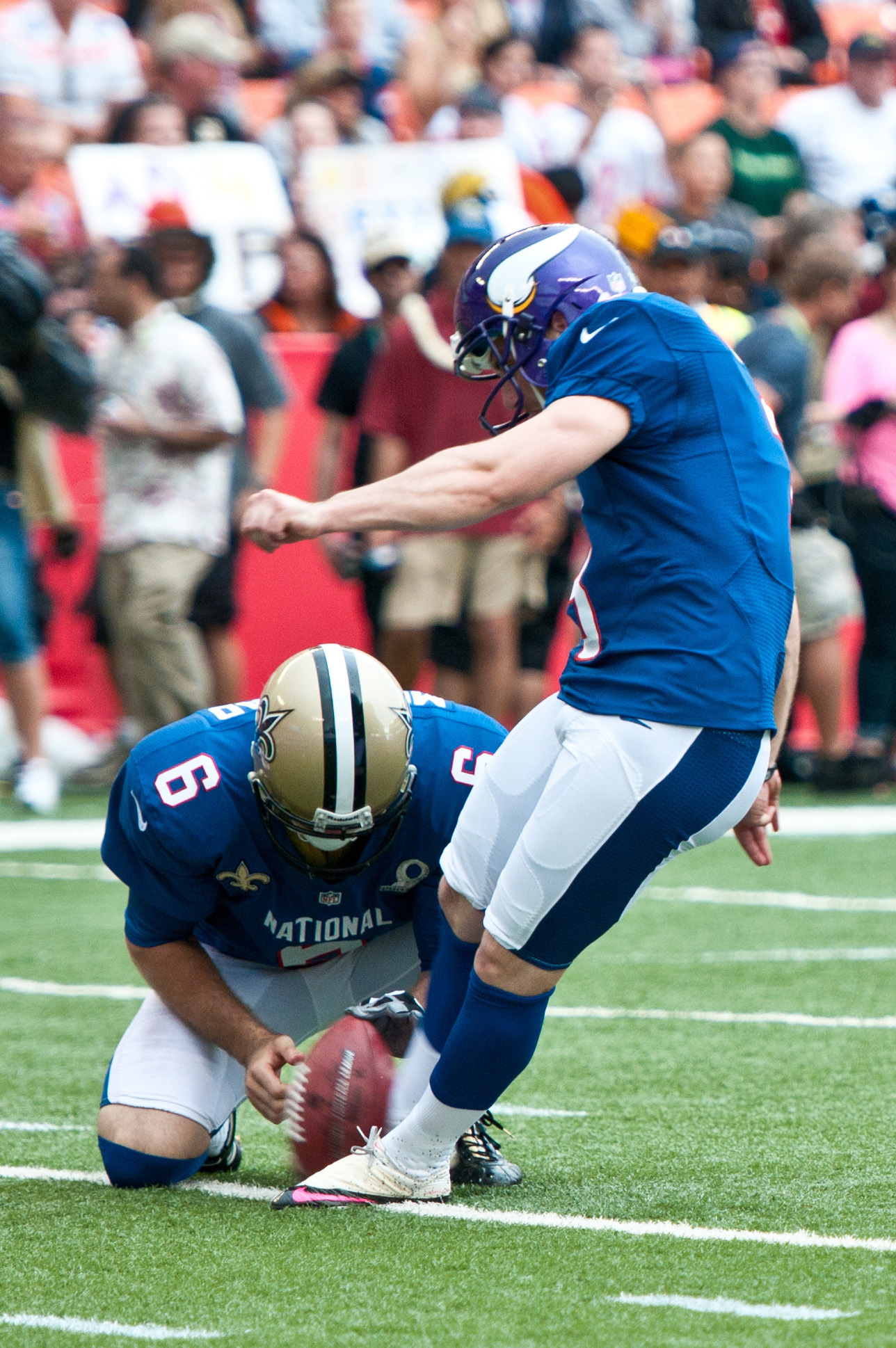
Morstead (left) serving as holder at the 2013 Pro Bowl

Before the 2014 season, Morstead was selected as the Saints' special teams captain. He finished the 2014 season with 58 punts for 2,690 yards and a 46.38 average.

Morstead retained the captain title in 2015. In the 2015 season, Morstead had 56 punts for 2,551 yards and a 45.55 average.

In the 2016 season, Morstead had 57 punts for 2,751 yards and a 48.26 average.

In the 2017 season, Morstead finished with 60 punts for 2,822 yards and a 47.03 average. In the NFC Divisional Round against the Minnesota Vikings, he tore cartilage in his rib cage after making a tackle in the first quarter but remained in the game. Nevertheless, Morstead was visibly hurt as he punted throughout the game. The Vikings scored the winning touchdown in the closing seconds of the game, and both sides assumed that the contest was over with Saints players headed for the locker room. However, Morstead was the first player to return to the field for the extra point attempt. Vikings' fans were impressed by the toughness and sportsmanship Morstead displayed in the eventual defeat, so a Vikings-dedicated Reddit group donated more than $140,000 to his charity in less than 24 hours, and Morstead presented the donations to the Children's Hospital of Minnesota.

On March 16, 2018, Morstead signed a five-year contract extension with the Saints. In the 2018 season, he punted 43 times for 1,996 yards and a 46.42 average.

In Week 3 of the 2019 season, Morstead downed four of his six punts inside the 20-yard line during a 33–27 road victory over the Seattle Seahawks, earning him NFC Special Teams Player of the Week honors. Morstead was later named NFC Special Teams Player of the Month for September. Three weeks later, he pinned five of his six punts inside the 20-yard line with a long of 51 yards in a 13–6 road victory over the Jacksonville Jaguars, earning him his second NFC Special Teams Player of the Week award of 2019. Morstead finished the 2019 season with 60 punts for 2,770 yards and a 46.17 average.

In Week 1 of the 2020 season against the Tampa Bay Buccaneers, Morstead placed five of his six punts inside the 20-yard line during the 34–23 victory and was named the NFC Special Teams Player of the Week for his performance. In the 2020 season, Morstead finished with 62 punts for 2,674 yards and a 43.13 average.

On March 4, 2021, the Saints released Morstead after 12 seasons.

=== New York Jets (first stint) ===
On September 14, 2021, Morstead signed with the New York Jets to fill in for the injured Braden Mann. He was released on November 8 after punting 23 times for 1,108 yards and a 46.1 average.

=== Atlanta Falcons ===
On November 23, 2021, Morstead signed with the Atlanta Falcons.

In his Falcons debut in Week 12, Morstead downed three of his five punts inside the 20-yard line during the 21–14 road victory over the Jaguars, earning NFC Special Teams Player of the Week. Morstead was also later named NFC Special Teams Player of the Month for December. In the 2021 season, he punted 45 times for 2,123 yards and a 47.18 average.

=== Miami Dolphins ===
On April 8, 2022, Morstead signed with the Miami Dolphins.

During a narrow Week 3 21–19 victory over the Buffalo Bills, Morstead inadvertently kicked a punt from the endzone into the buttocks of teammate Trent Sherfield, resulting in a safety. The play went viral, becoming known as the "Butt Punt". Morstead finished the 2022 season with 61 punts for 2,828 yards and a 46.36 average.

=== New York Jets (second stint) ===
On April 7, 2023, Morstead re-signed with the Jets.

During a Week 8 13–10 road victory over the New York Giants, Morstead had 11 punts, averaging 48.1 yards per punt, with the ball landing inside the five-yard line thrice. He was named AFC Special Teams Player of the Week for his performance. Morstead finished the 2023 season with a 48.8 average and led the league in punts with 99 and punting yards with 4,831.

On March 14, 2024, Morstead re-signed with the Jets. He appeared in all 17 games, logging 63 punts for 2,972 yards and a 47.2 average.

On May 13, 2025, following the signing of Kai Kroeger, Morstead was released by the Jets.

=== San Francisco 49ers ===
On May 28, 2025, Morstead signed with the San Francisco 49ers. On August 26, he was waived as part of final roster cuts, but was re-signed to the active roster the next day. He had 44 punts for 1,919 yards for a 43.6 average in the 2025 season.

=== Indianapolis Colts ===
On October 20, 2026, Morstead signed with the Indianapolis Colts practice squad, but was released four days later.

=== Tennessee Titans ===
On October 28, 2026, Morstead signed with the Tennessee Titans practice squad. He was then elevated to the active roster for a Week 8 game against the Cincinnati Bengals after Tommy Townsend was ruled out with a left knee injury. He was signed to the active roster on November 14.

== NFL career statistics ==
Legend
	Won the Super Bowl
	Led the league
**Bold**	Career high

=== Regular season ===
Year	Team	GP	Punting				
Year	Team	GP	Punts	Yds	Avg	Lng	Blk
2009	NO	16	58	2,528	43.6	60	0
2010	NO	16	57	2,618	45.9	64	0
2011	NO	16	46	2,224	48.3	64	**1**
2012	NO	16	74	3,707	**50.1**	70	0
2013	NO	16	61	2,859	46.9	61	0
2014	NO	16	58	2,690	46.4	63	0
2015	NO	14	56	2,551	45.6	58	0
2016	NO	16	57	2,751	48.3	66	0
2017	NO	16	60	2,822	47.0	68	0
2018	NO	16	43	1,996	46.4	60	0
2019	NO	16	60	2,770	46.2	64	0
2020	NO	16	62	2,674	43.1	58	0
2021	NYJ	7	23	1,108	48.2	59	0
2021	ATL	7	22	1,015	46.1	64	0
2022	MIA	**17**	61	2,828	46.4	66	0
2023	NYJ	**17**	**99**	**4,831**	48.8	62	0
2024	NYJ	**17**	63	2,972	47.2	**75**	0
2025	SF	**17**	44	1,919	43.6	55	0
2026	TEN	2	5	226	45.2	55	0
Career		274	1,009	47,089	46.7	75	1

=== Postseason ===
Year	Team	GP	Punting				
Year	Team	GP	Punts	Yds	Avg	Lng	Blk
2009	NO	**3**	**13**	**618**	47.5	**66**	0
2010	NO	1	4	191	**47.8**	55	0
2011	NO	2	5	227	45.4	60	0
2013	NO	2	7	260	37.1	55	0
2017	NO	2	8	375	46.9	57	0
2018	NO	2	7	305	43.6	50	0
2019	NO	1	5	229	45.8	50	0
2020	NO	2	5	200	40.0	58	0
2022	MIA	1	6	262	43.7	52	0
2025	SF	2	4	154	38.5	51	0
Career		18	64	2,821	44.1	66	0

== Personal life ==
Morstead and his wife, Lauren, have five children. In 2014, they created the charity What You Give Will Grow. Morstead is a Catholic.

Morstead co-wrote a book with Sean Jensen called "The Middle School Rules of Thomas Morstead."
