= Zach Sieler =

American football player (born 1995)

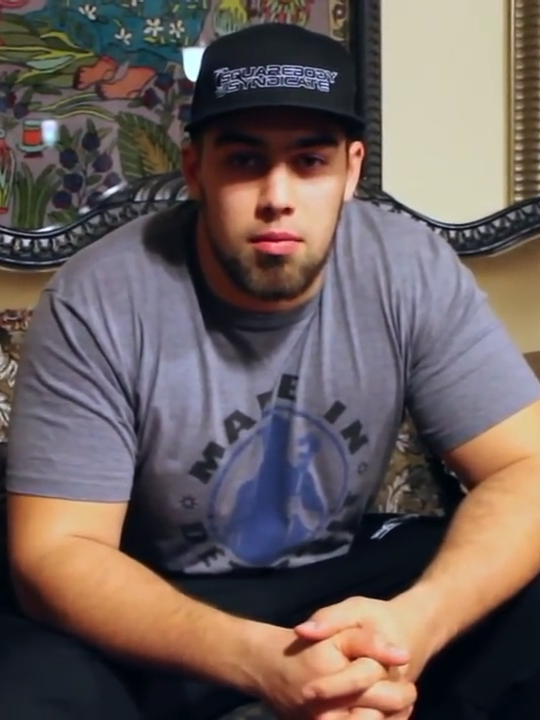
- Sieler in 2018

No. 92 – Miami Dolphins
- Position: Defensive tackle
- Roster status: Injured reserve

Personal information
- Born: September 7, 1995 (age 31); Pinckney, Michigan, U.S.
- Listed height: 6 ft 6 in (1.98 m)
- Listed weight: 300 lb (136 kg)

Career information
- High school: Pinckney
- College: Ferris State (2013–2017)
- NFL draft: 2018: 7th round, 238th overall pick

Career history
- Baltimore Ravens (2018–2019); Miami Dolphins (2019–present)

Awards and highlights
- 2× GLIAC Defensive Lineman of the Year (2016, 2017); 2× First-team All-GLIAC (2016, 2017); Ferris State Bulldogs No. 96 retired

Career NFL statistics as of 2025
- Total tackles: 357
- Sacks: 35.5
- Pass deflections: 16
- Interceptions: 2
- Forced fumbles: 5
- Fumble recoveries: 6
- Defensive touchdowns: 1
- Stats at Pro Football Reference

Zachary Wilfried Sieler (born September 7, 1995) is an American professional football defensive tackle for the Miami Dolphins of the National Football League (NFL). He played college football for the Ferris State Bulldogs, and was selected by the Baltimore Ravens in the seventh round of the 2018 NFL draft.

== Early life ==
Sieler was born in Pinckney, Michigan, as the eldest of three sons. In high school, Sieler was a three-sport athlete. He competed in track and field and amateur wrestling. In wrestling, Sieler was a state championship participant.

In football, Sieler played as a strong-side defensive end with the Pinckney Pirates. Sieler served the Pinckney Pirates as team captain and was named Athlete of the Year in his senior class. Despite standing 6 ft 6 in (1.98 m) and weighing 280 pounds (127 kg), Sieler was considered undersized and was not a highly rated recruiting prospect. He would later make high school history as the first NFL player from Pinckney High.

== College career ==
Sieler joined the Ferris State Bulldogs in 2013 as a walk-on. After redshirting the 2013 season, Sieler joined the field the following season and was part of the playoff squad that won the Great Lakes Intercollegiate Athletic Conference Championship during the 2014 and 2015 seasons. He earned GLIAC's Defensive Lineman of the Year and National Defensive Player of the Year honors during the 2015 and 2016 seasons. His contributions enabled the Ferris State Bulldogs to reach the 2016 NCAA Division II National Semifinals game. He did not play his senior season, opting instead to enter the 2018 NFL draft.

=== Legacy ===
On April 25, 2025, Sieler's No. 96 was retired by the Bulldogs. Sieler is one of two players to have their numbers retired by the program along with Jason Vander Laan, whose number was retired in 2022.

== Professional career ==
Pre-draft measurables
Height	Weight	Arm length	Hand span	Wingspan	40-yard dash	10-yard split	20-yard split	20-yard shuttle	Three-cone drill	Vertical jump	Broad jump	Bench press
6 ft 5 3/4 in (1.97 m)	288 lb (131 kg)	33 3/4 in (0.86 m)	10 1/8 in (0.26 m)	6 ft 8 3/8 in (2.04 m)	4.84 s	1.80 s	2.77 s	4.63 s	7.14 s	29.0 in (0.74 m)	9 ft 10 in (3.00 m)	31 reps
All values from Pro Day

=== Baltimore Ravens ===
Sieler was selected by the Baltimore Ravens in the seventh round (238th overall) of the 2018 NFL draft.

On August 31, 2019, Sieler was waived by the Ravens and was signed to the practice squad the next day. He was promoted to the active roster on October 5. Sieler was waived on December 4.

=== Miami Dolphins ===
On December 5, 2019, Sieler was claimed off waivers by the Miami Dolphins.

On April 17, 2020, Sieler was re-signed to a one-year contract by the Dolphins. He was placed on the reserve/COVID-19 list by the team on July 31, 2020, and was activated six days later.

On November 16, 2020, the Dolphins signed Sieler to a three-year contract extension through the 2023 season.

On August 27, 2023, Sieler signed a three-year, $38.65 million contract extension with the Dolphins. During the Dolphins' Week 14 loss to the Tennessee Titans, Sieler recorded his first career interception off of quarterback Will Levis, and returned it 5 yards for his first regular-season NFL touchdown.

In 2023, Sieler had 10 sacks which ranked him second on the team.

In Week 14 of the 2024 season, Sieler recorded four tackles and two sacks in a 32–26 win over the New York Jets, earning AFC Defensive Player of the Week.

On August 3, 2025, Sieler signed a three-year, $64 million contract extension with the Dolphins.

In Week 3 of the 2025 season, Sieler committed a roughing the punter early in the fourth quarter of a tie game against the Buffalo Bills. Buffalo scored a touchdown on the ensuing drive and went on to win by ten points.

== NFL career statistics ==
Legend
	Led the league
**Bold**	Career high

=== Regular season ===
Year	Team	Games		Tackles						Interceptions						Fumbles			
Year	Team	GP	GS	Comb	Solo	Ast	Sck	TFL	Sfty	PD	Int	Yds	Avg	Lng	TD	FF	FR	Yds	TD
2018	BAL	2	0	1	1	0	0.0	0	0	0	0	0	0.0	0	0	0	0	0	0
2019	BAL	4	0	3	2	1	0.0	0	0	0	0	0	0.0	0	0	0	0	0	0
2019	MIA	3	1	8	3	5	1.0	1	0	2	0	0	0.0	0	0	0	0	0	0
2020	MIA	16	8	48	30	18	3.5	11	0	0	0	0	0.0	0	0	0	0	0	0
2021	MIA	**17**	9	62	33	29	2.0	6	0	3	0	0	0.0	0	0	1	**2**	0	0
2022	MIA	**17**	15	**70**	**4**1	29	3.5	7	0	**4**	0	0	0.0	0	0	**2**	0	0	0
2023	MIA	**17**	**17**	63	32	**31**	**10.0**	11	0	**4**	**1**	**5**	**5.0**	**5**	**1**	1	**2**	**3**	0
2024	MIA	15	15	55	28	27	**10.0**	**13**	0	2	**1**	0	0.0	0	0	1	1	0	0
2025	MIA	**17**	**17**	47	29	18	5.5	10	0	1	0	0	0.0	0	0	0	1	5	0
Career		108	82	357	199	158	35.5	59	0	16	2	5	2.5	5	1	5	6	8	0

=== Postseason ===
Year	Team	Games		Tackles						Interceptions						Fumbles			
Year	Team	GP	GS	Comb	Solo	Ast	Sck	TFL	Sfty	PD	Int	Yds	Avg	Lng	TD	FF	FR	Yds	TD
2022	MIA	1	1	**6**	**3**	3	**2.0**	**1**	0	0	0	0	0.0	0	0	0	**1**	**5**	**1**
2023	MIA	1	1	4	0	**4**	0.0	0	0	**1**	0	0	0.0	0	0	0	0	0	0
Career		2	2	10	3	7	2.0	1	0	1	0	0	0.0	0	0	0	1	5	1

== Personal life ==
Sieler's younger brother Adam also played college football at Ferris State (2017–2022).
