= Frank Smith (American football) =

American football coach (born 1981)

Minnesota Vikings
- Title: Assistant head coach

Personal information
- Born: February 21, 1981 (age 45); Milwaukee, Wisconsin, U.S.
- Listed height: 6 ft 2 in (1.88 m)
- Listed weight: 295 lb (134 kg)

Career information
- High school: Cedarburg (Wisconsin)
- College: Miami (Ohio) (1999-2003)

Career history
- Miami (Ohio) (2004–2005) Graduate assistant; Butler (2006-2009); Offensive line coach (2006); Offensive coordinator & offensive line coach (2007-2009); New Orleans Saints (2010–2014) Assistant offensive line coach; Chicago Bears (2015–2017) Tight ends coach; Oakland / Las Vegas Raiders (2018–2020) Tight ends coach; Los Angeles Chargers (2021) Run game coordinator & offensive line coach; Miami Dolphins (2022–2025) Offensive coordinator; Minnesota Vikings (2026–present) Assistant head coach
- Coaching profile at Pro Football Reference

Frank Smith (born February 21, 1981) is an American professional football coach and former player who is currently the assistant head coach for the Minnesota Vikings of the National Football League (NFL). He has previously been a coach for the Los Angeles Chargers, New Orleans Saints, Chicago Bears, and Miami Dolphins. Prior to entering coaching, Smith played college football as an offensive lineman for Miami (Ohio) from 1999-2003. He was a team captain and three-year starting guard for future star NFL quarterback Ben Roethlisberger.

== Coaching career ==
=== New Orleans Saints ===
In 2010, Smith was hired by the New Orleans Saints as their assistant offensive line coach. During his time with the Saints, Smith supported the offensive staff in game preparation and assisted with the offensive line. From 2010 to 2014, the Saints offensive line allowed just 143 sacks, third fewest in the NFL. Four Saints offensive linemen were named to the Pro Bowl during Smith’s time with the unit: T Jermon Bushrod, G Jahri Evans, G Ben Grubbs, and G Carl Nicks. Evans was named first-team All-Pro by the Associated Press three times (2010–12) and Nicks earned the honor once (2011).

=== Chicago Bears ===
In 2015, Smith was hired by the Chicago Bears as their tight ends coach. He worked with Zach Miller to achieve his highest career production and helped develop several different young players.

=== Oakland / Las Vegas Raiders ===
On January 13, 2018, Smith was hired by the Oakland Raiders as their tight ends coach under head coach Jon Gruden. He developed two first time Pro Bowl tight ends, Jared Cook and Darren Waller, during his time under Gruden.

=== Los Angeles Chargers ===
In 2021, Smith worked as the run game coordinator and offensive line coach for the Chargers. Under Smith, two players earned their first Pro Bowl selections: Corey Linsley at center and Rashawn Slater at left tackle. Slater was the first rookie left tackle in over 10 years to make it to the Pro Bowl.

=== Miami Dolphins ===
On February 14, 2022, Smith was hired by the Miami Dolphins to serve as the team's offensive coordinator under newly-hired head coach Mike McDaniel.

=== Minnesota Vikings ===
On February 24, 2026, Smith was officially hired to serve as the assistant head coach for the Minnesota Vikings, under head coach Kevin O'Connell.
