= Trent Sherfield =

American football player (born 1996)

Trent Sherfield Sr.
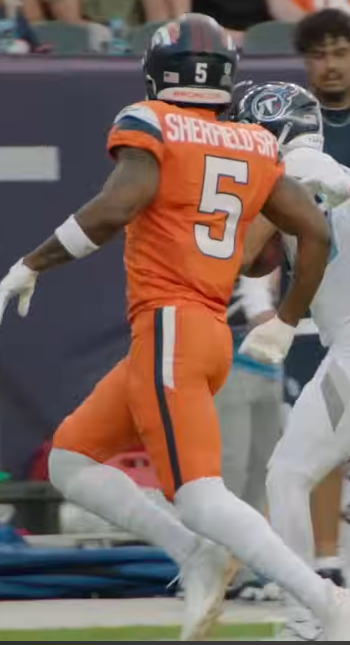
- Sherfield with the Denver Broncos in 2025

No. 18 – Buffalo Bills
- Positions: Wide receiver, Special teamer
- Roster status: Practice squad

Personal information
- Born: February 25, 1996 (age 30); Danville, Illinois, U.S.
- Listed height: 6 ft 1 in (1.85 m)
- Listed weight: 206 lb (93 kg)

Career information
- High school: Danville
- College: Vanderbilt (2014–2017)
- NFL draft: 2018: undrafted

Career history
- Arizona Cardinals (2018–2020); San Francisco 49ers (2021); Miami Dolphins (2022); Buffalo Bills (2023); Minnesota Vikings (2024); Denver Broncos (2025); Arizona Cardinals (2025); New England Patriots (2025)*; Buffalo Bills (2026–present)
- * Offseason or practice squad member only

Career NFL statistics as of 2025
- Receptions: 89
- Receiving yards: 1,034
- Receiving touchdowns: 6
- Tackles: 40
- Stats at Pro Football Reference

Trent Nyrell Sherfield Sr. (born February 25, 1996) is an American professional football wide receiver and special teamer for the Buffalo Bills of the National Football League (NFL). He has previously played for the Arizona Cardinals, San Francisco 49ers, Miami Dolphins, Minnesota Vikings, and Denver Broncos. He played college football for the Vanderbilt Commodores.

== Early life and college ==
Sherfield excelled as a two-way player at Danville High School. He was a three-year starter, starring as a dual-threat quarterback and a defensive back. Rivals ranked him as a 4-star safety recruit. He committed to play college football for Vanderbilt over offers from Illinois, Illinois State, Indiana, Northern Illinois, and Purdue.

Upon arriving at Vanderbilt, Sherfield switched positions to wide receiver. In his Vanderbilt career, Sherfield played in 48 games with 27 starts over four seasons. As a senior captain, he had 50 receptions for a team-leading and career high 729 yards and five touchdowns. Sherfield finished his Vanderbilt career with 136 receptions for 1,869 yards, ranked eighth in school history for both, along with nine touchdown catches.

== Professional career ==
Pre-draft measurables
Height	Weight	Arm length	Hand span	Wingspan	40-yard dash	10-yard split	20-yard split	20-yard shuttle	Three-cone drill	Vertical jump	Broad jump	Bench press
6 ft 0 1/4 in (1.84 m)	203 lb (92 kg)	31 7/8 in (0.81 m)	9 5/8 in (0.24 m)	6 ft 5 7/8 in (1.98 m)	4.45 s	1.57 s	2.53 s	4.20 s	6.90 s	32.5 in (0.83 m)	10 ft 5 in (3.18 m)	19 reps
All values from Pro Day

=== Arizona Cardinals ===
Sherfield signed with the Arizona Cardinals as an undrafted free agent on May 9, 2018. On August 23, 2018, during a preseason game against the Dallas Cowboys, Sherfield recovered a blocked punt for a touchdown. A week later, in a game against the Denver Broncos, he caught two passes for 44 yards. Sherfield played in 13 games with two starts as a rookie, finishing with 19 receptions for 210 yards and one touchdown.

Sherfield was placed on the reserve/COVID-19 list by the Cardinals on November 27, 2020, and activated on December 2.

=== San Francisco 49ers ===
Sherfield signed with the San Francisco 49ers on March 19, 2021. After his preseason performance of 5 receptions for 156 yards and a touchdown over 3 games, Sherfield was officially listed on the 49ers' 53-man roster going into the 2021 season.

=== Miami Dolphins ===
Sherfield signed a one-year contract with the Miami Dolphins on March 18, 2022.

Overall, Sherfield surpassed his career highs in several categories, which were set in his rookie season, during his lone season in Miami. He caught 30 passes for 417 yards and two touchdowns.

=== Buffalo Bills ===
Sherfield signed a one-year contract with the Buffalo Bills on March 20, 2023. Sherfield caught his first touchdown with the Bills against his old team, the Miami Dolphins, in Week 18, off a deflected pass. The Bills would go on to win 21–14 to clinch the division title.

=== Minnesota Vikings ===
On March 14, 2024, Sherfield signed with the Minnesota Vikings.

=== Denver Broncos ===
On March 13, 2025, the Denver Broncos signed Sherfield to a two-year, $8 million contract. On November 15, Sherfield was waived by the Broncos after they signed Lil'Jordan Humphrey to replace his role.

=== Arizona Cardinals (second stint) ===
On November 19, 2025, Sherfield was signed to the Arizona Cardinals' practice squad.

=== New England Patriots ===
On January 13, 2026, Sherfield was signed to the New England Patriots' practice squad. He was released on January 24, but was re-signed to the practice squad four days later.

=== Buffalo Bills (second stint) ===
On March 26, 2026, Sherfield signed with the Buffalo Bills on a one-year contract. Sherfield was released by Buffalo as a part of final roster cuts on August 30; he was re-signed to the team's practice squad the next day.
