= Josh Boyer =

American football coach (born 1977)

Ohio State Buckeyes football
- Title: Defensive quality control coach

Personal information
- Born: January 27, 1977 (age 49); Heath, Ohio, U.S.

Career information
- High school: Heath
- College: Muskingum

Career history
- King's College (2000) Graduate assistant; Dayton (2001) Graduate assistant; Kent State (2002–2003) Graduate assistant; Bryant (2004) Defensive backs coach; South Dakota School of Mines (2005) Defensive coordinator; New England Patriots (2006–2008) Defensive assistant; New England Patriots (2009–2011) Defensive backs coach; New England Patriots (2012–2018) Cornerbacks coach; Miami Dolphins (2019) Defensive pass game coordinator & cornerbacks coach; Miami Dolphins (2020–2022) Defensive coordinator; Ohio State (2025-present) Defensive quality control

Awards and highlights
- 3× Super Bowl champion (XLIX, LI, LIII)
- Coaching profile at Pro Football Reference

Josh Boyer (born January 21, 1977) is an American football coach who is a defensive quality control coach for the Ohio State Buckeyes. Boyer previously coached with the New England Patriots and multiple college football teams.

== Coaching career ==
=== College ===
After graduating from Muskingum College, where he played football as a wide receiver and defensive back, he began his coaching career in 2000 as a graduate assistant at King's College, Pennsylvania. He then served in the same capacity at the University of Dayton in 2001 and Kent State University in 2002 and 2003. In 2004, Boyer served as the defensive backs coach at Bryant University. He then served as the defensive coordinator at the South Dakota School of Mines and Technology in 2005 before joining the New England Patriots in 2006.

=== New England Patriots ===
Boyer joined the Patriots in 2006 as a defensive coaching assistant. He was promoted to defensive backs coach following the 2008 season. In 2012, his title was changed to cornerbacks coach. Boyer won three Super Bowls and six AFC Championships with the Patriots.

=== Miami Dolphins ===
In 2019, Boyer left the Patriots, following Brian Flores to the Miami Dolphins. He became the team's defensive pass game coordinator and cornerbacks coach. In 2020, he was promoted to defensive coordinator. On January 19, 2023, Miami fired him as defensive coordinator.

=== Ohio State ===
In 2025, Boyer joined the Ohio State Buckeyes as a defensive quality control coach.
