= 2019 Miami Dolphins season =

54th season in franchise history

- Owner: Stephen M. Ross
- General manager: Chris Grier
- Head coach: Brian Flores
- Home stadium: Hard Rock Stadium

Results
- Record: 5–11
- Division place: 4th AFC East
- Playoffs: Did not qualify
- All-Pros: None
- Pro Bowlers: None

Uniform
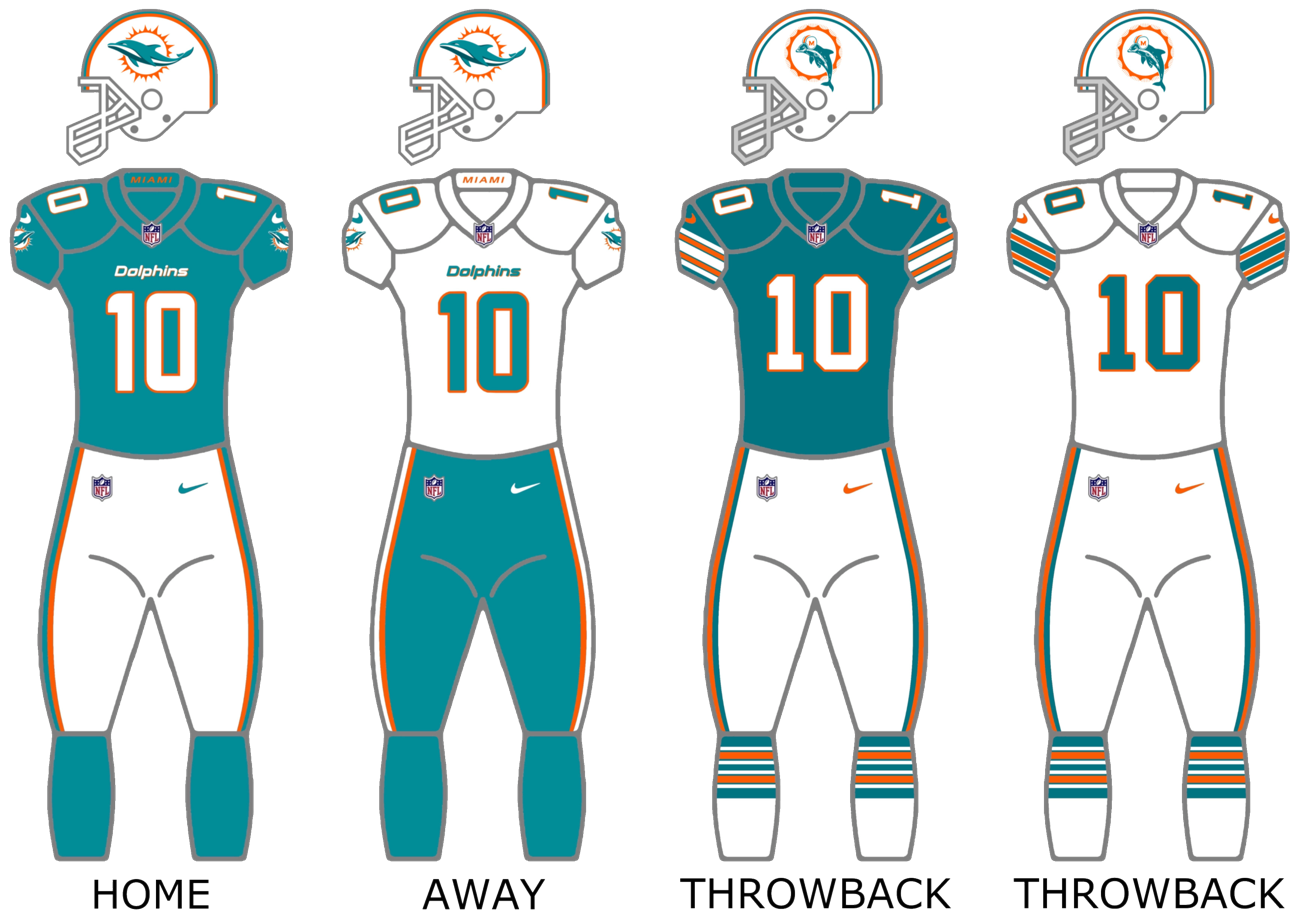

The 2019 season was the Miami Dolphins' 50th in the National Football League (NFL), their 54th overall and their first under new head coach Brian Flores.

Early in the season, the Dolphins were believed by many people to be intentionally losing games in hopes of getting a better draft position, most notably for Alabama quarterback Tua Tagovailoa, who at the time, was considered the likely first pick in the 2020 NFL draft before suffering a season-ending hip injury on November 16, 2019. A common refrain at the time was, "Tank for Tua". Through Week 8, the Dolphins traded key contributors including recent first round picks Laremy Tunsil and Minkah Fitzpatrick, along with Kenyan Drake, and Ryan Tannehill.

It was the Dolphins' first season since 2011 without Ryan Tannehill, as he was traded along with the draft rights of David Long Jr. to the Tennessee Titans in exchange for the draft rights of Solomon Kindley in 2019 and Chandler Cox in 2020 during the offseason. After Tannehill was traded, the Dolphins would go on to sign journeyman quarterback Ryan Fitzpatrick and trade for Arizona Cardinals quarterback Josh Rosen. As he outplayed Rosen during training camp, Fitzpatrick started the majority of the season, with Rosen starting from Weeks 3 to 6. On December 22, Fitzpatrick became the first Dolphins' quarterback to pass for 400 yards and four touchdowns since Dan Marino did so in a 38–31 win over the Browns in 1988. Despite defeating the Philadelphia Eagles in Week 13, the Dolphins were eliminated from playoff contention for the third consecutive year after the Pittsburgh Steelers won that same day.

Ultimately failing to improve on their 7–9 record from the previous season, the team started the season 0–7, but rallied to win five of their last nine games. Although the victories prevented the Dolphins from obtaining the first overall pick of the 2020 draft, they were able to select Tagovailoa, whose draft stock had fallen due to his injury.

This was the Dolphins' first season with exactly five wins since 1968 and their first since the league expanded to 16 games in 1978. It was also their first season winning fewer than six games since their franchise-worst 2007 season. Additionally, it was the Dolphins' first season since 2004 without long-time snapper John Denney, as he was released on September 2, 2019. Denney was the longest tenured player on the Dolphins' roster prior to his release, having been with the team since 2005. It made 5th-year wide receiver DeVante Parker the new longest-tenured player on the roster. As of the 2024 season, this is the most recent season the Dolphins have finished in last place in the AFC East.

This season marked the first time since the 1997 season that the Dolphins failed to have a Pro Bowler.

== Offseason coaching change ==
The Dolphins fired head coach Adam Gase on December 31, 2018, after the team missed the playoffs for a second-straight season and finished 2018 with a 7–9 record. The Dolphins conducted interviews with several candidates such as team assistants Dowell Loggains and Darren Rizzi, Kansas City Chiefs offensive coordinator Eric Bieniemy, and New England Patriots linebackers coach, defensive play caller, and long-time assistant Brian Flores. The team was primarily linked to Flores but had to wait to hire him until after the Patriots were out of the NFL playoffs due to league rules. Flores served in several positions with the Patriots since their 2004 Super Bowl-winning season, beginning as a scout before getting promoted to Bill Belichick's coaching staff in 2008. Flores most recently served as New England's Linebackers' coach from 2016 to 2018, and was also part of three of their Super Bowl-winning squads (2014, 2016, and 2018), as well as the AFC-winning 2011 and 2017 squads. On February 4, 2019, the day after Super Bowl LIII, the team announced Flores as their thirteenth head coach. Prior to his hiring by the Dolphins, Flores was also interviewed for the head coaching vacancies of teams such as the Denver Broncos, Cleveland Browns, and Green Bay Packers. The Dolphins announced the majority of Flores' coaching staff on February 8, 2019, including Chad O'Shea as offensive coordinator, Patrick Graham as defensive coordinator, Danny Crossman as special teams coordinator, and former Indianapolis Colts/Detroit Lions head coach Jim Caldwell as assistant head coach and quarterbacks coach. On July 29, 2019, just four days into Dolphins camp, Flores sent a quick message by firing the OL Coach Pat Flaherty whom he had hired in the spring and replacing him with team analyst Dave DeGuglielmo. Flores had deemed Flaherty to be ineffective in implementing the team’s new system.

== Draft ==
2019 Miami Dolphins Draft
Round	Selection	Player	Position	College
1	13	Christian Wilkins	DE	Clemson
2	Traded to the Arizona Cardinals			
3	78	Michael Deiter	G	Wisconsin
4	Traded to the New Orleans Saints			
5	151	Andrew Van Ginkel	LB	Wisconsin
6	202	Isaiah Prince	OT	Ohio State
7	233	Chandler Cox	FB	Auburn
7	234	Myles Gaskin	RB	Washington

=== Draft Trades ===
- The Miami Dolphins traded a conditional seventh-round selection to Detroit in exchange for defensive tackle Akeem Spence.

=== Notable Undrafted Free Agents ===
2019 Miami Dolphins Draft
Round	Selection	Player	Position	College
—	—	Shaq Calhoun	G	Mississippi State
—	—	Patrick Laird	RB	California
—	—	Nik Needham	CB	UTEP
—	—	Preston Williams	WR	Colorado State

== Staff ==
2019 Miami Dolphins staff
Front office: Chairman/managing general partner – Stephen Ross; Vice chairman/partner – Bruce Beal; Vice chairman – Jorge Perez; Vice chairman – Don Shula; Vice chairman – Matt Higgins; Vice chairman, president, and CEO – Tom Garfinkel; General manager – Chris Grier; Assistant general manager – Marvin Allen; Vice president, football administration – Brandon Shore; Senior personnel executive – Reggie McKenzie; Co-director, player personnel – Adam Engroff; Co-director, player personnel – Anthony Hunt; Head coaches: Head coach – Brian Flores; Assistant head coach/quarterbacks – Jim Caldwell (stepped down July 13, 2019); Offensive coaches: Offensive coordinator – Chad O'Shea; Assistant quarterbacks – Jerry Schuplinski; Running backs – Eric Studesville; Wide receivers – Karl Dorrell; Tight ends – George Godsey; Offensive line – Dave DeGuglielmo; Offensive line - Pat Flaherty (fired July 29, 2019)	Defensive coaches: Defensive coordinator – Patrick Graham; Defensive line – Marion Hobby; Linebackers – Rob Leonard; Defensive pass game coordinator/cornerbacks – Josh Boyer; Safeties – Tony Oden; Special teams coaches: Special teams coordinator – Danny Crossman; Assistant special teams – Brendan Farrell; Quality Control Coaches: Quality control – Josh Grizzard; Quality control – Mike Judge; Quality control – Matt Lombardi; Quality control – Tiquan Underwood; Strength and conditioning: Head strength and conditioning – Dave Puloka; Assistant strength and conditioning – Jim Arthur

== Final roster ==
2019 Miami Dolphins roster
Quarterbacks (QB): 14 Ryan Fitzpatrick; 3 Josh Rosen; Running backs (RB): 38 Chandler Cox FB; 42 Patrick Laird; 29 Samaje Perine; 34 De'Lance Turner; Wide receivers (WR): 89 Trevor Davis; 84 Isaiah Ford; 86 Mack Hollins; 17 Allen Hurns; 11 DeVante Parker; 15 Albert Wilson; Tight ends (TE): 88 Mike Gesicki; 81 Durham Smythe; 87 Clive Walford	Offensive linemen (OL): 76 Evan Boehm C; 68 Evan Brown C; 62 Shaq Calhoun G; 70 Julién Davenport T; 77 Jesse Davis T; 63 Michael Deiter G; 67 Daniel Kilgore C; 78 Adam Pankey T; 74 Keaton Sutherland G; 61 J'Marcus Webb T; Defensive linemen (DL): 96 Taco Charlton DE; 59 Jamal Davis II DE; 56 Davon Godchaux DT; 90 Charles Harris DE; 97 Trent Harris DE; 95 John Jenkins DT; 93 Avery Moss DE; 92 Zach Sieler DT; 94 Christian Wilkins DT	Linebackers (LB): 55 Jerome Baker OLB; 47 Vince Biegel OLB; 49 Samuel Eguavoen OLB; 43 Andrew Van Ginkel MLB; 44 Deon Lacey OLB; 48 Calvin Munson OLB; Defensive backs (DB): 35 Walt Aikens CB; 30 Nate Brooks CB; 36 Adrian Colbert FS; 41 Montre Hartage FS; 22 Tae Hayes CB; 40 Nik Needham CB; 26 Steven Parker FS; 21 Eric Rowe CB; 32 Linden Stephens CB; 33 Jomal Wiltz CB; Special teams (ST): 2 Matt Haack P; 46 Taybor Pepper LS; 7 Jason Sanders K	Practice squad: 73 Jonathan Bonner DE; 50 Jake Carlock OLB; 1 Rashard Causey CB; 57 Terrill Hanks MLB; 82 Andy Jones WR; 85 Chris Myarick TE; 79 Chidi Okeke T; 69 Durval Queiroz Neto G (IPP); 80 T. J. Rahming WR; 5 Jake Rudock QB; 83 Terry Wright WR; Reserve: 59 Chase Allen OLB (IR); 27 Kalen Ballage RB (IR); 51 James Crawford OLB (IR); 37 Myles Gaskin RB (IR); 19 Jakeem Grant WR (IR); 25 Xavien Howard CB (IR); 45 Mike Hull MLB (PUP); 65 Danny Isidora G (IR); 16 Gary Jennings Jr. WR (IR); 20 Reshad Jones SS (IR); 98 Jonathan Ledbetter DE (IR); 24 Ryan Lewis CB (IR); -- Ricardo Louis WR (IR); 28 Bobby McCain FS (IR); 52 Raekwon McMillan MLB (IR); 75 Kendrick Norton DE (NF-Inj.); -- Aqib Talib CB (IR); 23 Cordrea Tankersley CB (PUP); 31 Ken Webster CB (IR); 18 Preston Williams WR (IR); 53 Gerald Willis DT (IR); Rookies in italics 53 active, 21 reserve, 11 practice squad

== Preseason ==
Week	Date	Opponent	Result	Record	Venue	Recap
1	August 8	Atlanta Falcons	W 34–27	1–0	Hard Rock Stadium	Recap
2	August 16	at Tampa Bay Buccaneers	L 14–16	1–1	Raymond James Stadium	Recap
3	August 22	Jacksonville Jaguars	W 22–7	2–1	Hard Rock Stadium	Recap
4	August 29	at New Orleans Saints	W 16–13	3–1	Mercedes-Benz Superdome	Recap

== Regular season ==
=== Schedule ===
Week	Date	Opponent	Result	Record	Venue	Recap
1	September 8	Baltimore Ravens	**L** 10–59	0–1	Hard Rock Stadium	Recap
2	September 15	**New England Patriots**	**L** 0–43	0–2	Hard Rock Stadium	Recap
3	September 22	at Dallas Cowboys	**L** 6–31	0–3	AT&T Stadium	Recap
4	September 29	Los Angeles Chargers	**L** 10–30	0–4	Hard Rock Stadium	Recap
5	Bye					
6	October 13	Washington Redskins	**L** 16–17	0–5	Hard Rock Stadium	Recap
7	October 20	at **Buffalo Bills**	**L** 21–31	0–6	New Era Field	Recap
8	October 28	at Pittsburgh Steelers	**L** 14–27	0–7	Heinz Field	Recap
9	November 3	**New York Jets**	**W** 26–18	1–7	Hard Rock Stadium	Recap
10	November 10	at Indianapolis Colts	**W** 16–12	2–7	Lucas Oil Stadium	Recap
11	November 17	**Buffalo Bills**	**L** 20–37	2–8	Hard Rock Stadium	Recap
12	November 24	at Cleveland Browns	**L** 24–41	2–9	FirstEnergy Stadium	Recap
13	December 1	Philadelphia Eagles	**W** 37–31	3–9	Hard Rock Stadium	Recap
14	December 8	at **New York Jets**	**L** 21–22	3–10	MetLife Stadium	Recap
15	December 15	at New York Giants	**L** 20–36	3–11	MetLife Stadium	Recap
16	December 22	Cincinnati Bengals	**W** 38–35 (OT)	4–11	Hard Rock Stadium	Recap
17	December 29	at **New England Patriots**	**W** 27–24	5–11	Gillette Stadium	Recap

Note: Intra-division opponents are in bold text.

=== Game summaries ===
==== Week 1: vs. Baltimore Ravens ====
Week One: Baltimore Ravens at Miami Dolphins – Game summary

Quarter	1	2	3	4	Total
**Ravens**	21	21	10	7	**59**
Dolphins	0	10	0	0	**10**

at Hard Rock Stadium, Miami Gardens, Florida

- Date: September 8
- Game time: 1:00 p.m. EDT
- Game weather: Mostly cloudy, 91 °F (33 °C)
- Game attendance: 65,012
- Referee: Jerome Boger
- TV announcers (CBS): Andrew Catalon and James Lofton
- Recap, Game Book

Game information

**First quarter**

- BAL – Mark Ingram II 1-yard run (Justin Tucker kick), 10:34. Ravens 7–0. **Drive: 8 plays, 89 yards, 4:26.**
- BAL – Marquise Brown 47-yard pass from Lamar Jackson (Justin Tucker kick), 8:37. Ravens 14–0. **Drive: 1 plays, 47 yards, 0:09.**
- BAL – Marquise Brown 83-yard pass from Lamar Jackson (Justin Tucker kick), 4:17. Ravens 21–0. **Drive: 3 plays, 90 yards, 1:29.**

**Second quarter**

- BAL – Willie Snead IV 33-yard pass from Lamar Jackson (Justin Tucker kick), 13:49. Ravens 28–0. **Drive: 7 plays, 80 yards, 3:23.**
- MIA – Jason Sanders 54-yard field goal, 10:38. Ravens 28–3. **Drive: 6 plays, 39 yards, 3:11.**
- BAL – Miles Boykin 5-yard pass from Lamar Jackson (Justin Tucker kick), 6:50. Ravens 35–3. **Drive: 3 plays, 10 yards, 1:34.**
- BAL – Mark Ingram II 2-yard run (Justin Tucker kick), 1:42. Ravens 42–3. **Drive: 7 plays, 79 yards, 2:37.**
- MIA – Preston Williams 6-yard pass from Ryan Fitzpatrick (Jason Sanders kick), 0:13. Ravens 42–10. **Drive: 8 plays, 75 yards, 1:29.**

**Third quarter**

- BAL – Patrick Ricard 1-yard pass from Lamar Jackson (Justin Tucker kick), 7:54. Ravens 49–10. **Drive: 9 plays, 71 yards, 5:08.**
- BAL – Justin Tucker 34-yard field goal, 0:22. Ravens 52–10. **Drive: 9 plays, 68 yards, 5:25.**

**Fourth quarter**

- BAL – Mark Andrews 3-yard pass from Robert Griffin III (Justin Tucker kick), 9:24. Ravens 59–10. **Drive: 9 plays, 42 yards, 5:30.**

**Top passers**

- BAL – Lamar Jackson – 17/20, 324 yards, 5 TD
- MIA – Ryan Fitzpatrick – 14/29, 185 yards, TD, INT

**Top rushers**

- BAL – Mark Ingram II – 14 rushes, 107 yards, 2 TD
- MIA – Kenyan Drake – 4 rushes, 12 yards

**Top receivers**

- BAL – Marquise Brown – 4 receptions, 147 yards, 2 TD
- MIA – DeVante Parker – 3 receptions, 75 yards

The Dolphins opened their season against the Ravens in Week 1. The Dolphins gave up 49 yards on the first play from scrimmage, and they subsequently allowed Baltimore to score on that same possession. The next drive, Ryan Fitzpatrick was picked off, which already put the Dolphins in an early hole. The Dolphins' misery continued when the Ravens scored right after another Fitzpatrick interception. The Dolphins and Ravens exchanged punts and Ravens' scores. After the series of exchanges, the Dolphins finally got on the board cutting the Ravens lead to 28–3. The Dolphins ended the first half down 42–10, with the Preston Williams touchdown play from Ryan Fitzpatrick. That was the last scoring play by the Dolphins. The Dolphins' defense showed no signs of improvement later in the game with the Ravens scoring on three more drives. The Dolphins defense allowed 59 points off of a total of 643 yards, which was the most yards surrendered by any Dolphins team in NFL history. This was also the franchise's worst loss since a 62-7 loss to the Jacksonville Jaguars in the 1999 AFC Divisional Round.

==== Week 2: vs. New England Patriots ====
Week Two: New England Patriots at Miami Dolphins – Game summary

Quarter	1	2	3	4	Total
**Patriots**	7	6	10	20	**43**
Dolphins	0	0	0	0	**0**

at Hard Rock Stadium, Miami Gardens, Florida

- Date: September 15
- Game time: 1:00 p.m. EDT
- Game weather: Mostly cloudy, 87 °F (31 °C)
- Game attendance: 65,513
- Referee: Bill Vinovich
- TV announcers (CBS): Ian Eagle, Dan Fouts and Evan Washburn
- Recap, Game Book

Game information

**First quarter**

- NE – Sony Michel 1-yard run (Stephen Gostkowski kick), 7:46. Patriots 7–0. **Drive: 10 plays, 60 yards, 5:52.**

**Second quarter**

- NE – Antonio Brown 20-yard pass from Tom Brady (kick failed, wide left), 1:19. Patriots 13–0. **Drive: 11 plays, 65 yards, 6:11.**

**Third quarter**

- NE – Stephen Gostkowski 28-yard field goal, 8:45. Patriots 16–0. **Drive: 10 plays, 26 yards, 3:41.**
- NE – Tom Brady 1-yard run (Stephen Gostkowski kick), 2:18. Patriots 23–0. **Drive: 8 plays, 65 yards, 5:08.**

**Fourth quarter**

- NE – Stephon Gilmore 54-yard interception return (Stephen Gostkowski kick), 10:45. Patriots 30–0.
- NE – Jamie Collins 69-yard interception return (Stephen Gostkowski kick), 8:57. Patriots 37–0.
- NE – James White 10-yard pass from Tom Brady (kick failed, wide right), 2:10. Patriots 43–0. **Drive: 5 plays, 59 yards, 2:59.**

**Top passers**

- NE – Tom Brady – 20/28, 264 yards, 2 TD
- MIA – Josh Rosen – 7/18, 97 yards, INT

**Top rushers**

- NE – Sony Michel – 21 rushes, 85 yards, TD
- MIA – Kenyan Drake – 6 rushes, 19 yards

**Top receivers**

- NE – Antonio Brown – 4 receptions, 56 yards, TD
- MIA – Preston Williams – 4 receptions, 63 yards

In their second consecutive poor performance, the Dolphins had seven possessions that went three-and-out, gave up two interceptions that were returned for touchdowns and starting quarterback Ryan Fitzpatrick was pulled in favor of his backup, Josh Rosen, after Fitzpatrick accounted for three out of the four interceptions thrown by both quarterbacks. The negative-92 point differential over the first two games was the worst since the 1973 New Orleans Saints, who also had a negative-92 point differential via blowout losses in the first two games of the season.

==== Week 3: at Dallas Cowboys ====
Week Three: Miami Dolphins at Dallas Cowboys – Game summary

Quarter	1	2	3	4	Total
Dolphins	3	3	0	0	**6**
**Cowboys**	10	0	14	7	**31**

at AT&T Stadium, Arlington, Texas

- Date: September 22
- Game time: 1:00 p.m. EDT/12:00 p.m. CDT
- Game weather: None (retractable roof closed)
- Game attendance: 90,127
- Referee: Adrian Hill
- TV announcers (Fox): Kevin Burkhardt, Charles Davis and Pam Oliver
- Recap, Game Book

Game information

**First quarter**

- DAL – Brett Maher 28-yard field goal, 10:27. Cowboys 3–0. **Drive: 8 plays, 53 yards, 2:53.**
- DAL – Amari Cooper 5-yard pass from Dak Prescott (Brett Maher kick), 5:57. Cowboys 10–0. **Drive: 9 plays, 54 yards, 3:26.**
- MIA – Jason Sanders 22-yard field goal, 0:53. Cowboys 10–3. **Drive: 10 plays, 72 yards, 5:04.**

**Second quarter**

- MIA – Jason Sanders 33-yard field goal, 5:48. Cowboys 10–6. **Drive: 10 plays, 49 yards, 4:45.**

**Third quarter**

- DAL – Amari Cooper 19-yard pass from Dak Prescott (Brett Maher kick), 12:28. Cowboys 17–6. **Drive: 5 plays, 75 yards, 2:32.**
- DAL – Dak Prescott 8-yard run (Brett Maher kick), 3:30. Cowboys 24–6. **Drive: 9 plays, 76 yards, 5:28.**

**Fourth quarter**

- DAL – Tony Pollard 16-yard run (Brett Maher kick), 3:45. Cowboys 31–6. **Drive: 5 plays, 60 yards, 1:42.**

**Top passers**

- MIA – Josh Rosen – 18/39, 200 yards
- DAL – Dak Prescott – 19/32, 246 yards, 2 TD, INT

**Top rushers**

- MIA – Kenyan Drake – 12 rushes, 38 yards
- DAL – Ezekiel Elliott – 19 rushes, 125 yards

**Top receivers**

- MIA – Preston Williams – 4 receptions, 68 yards
- DAL – Amari Cooper – 6 receptions, 88 yards, 2 TD

Quarterback Josh Rosen, acquired via trade prior to the season, made his first start as a Dolphin in place of Ryan Fitzpatrick. The Dolphins were seeking their first win over Dallas since 2003, and entered the game as 22-point underdogs. They showed some competitiveness by narrowing Dallas' lead to 10–6, but afterwards, the Dolphins proved they were no match against the Cowboys. Dallas scored the final 21 points of the game. With this loss, the Dolphins dropped to 0–3.

==== Week 4: vs. Los Angeles Chargers ====
Week Four: Los Angeles Chargers at Miami Dolphins – Game summary

Quarter	1	2	3	4	Total
**Chargers**	10	7	3	10	**30**
Dolphins	7	3	0	0	**10**

at Hard Rock Stadium, Miami Gardens, Florida

- Date: September 29
- Game time: 1:00 p.m. EDT
- Game weather: Mostly cloudy, 88 °F (31 °C)
- Game attendance: 64,278
- Referee: Tony Corrente
- TV announcers (CBS): Tom McCarthy and Jay Feely
- Recap, Game Book

Game information

**First quarter**

- LAC – Ty Long 44-yard field goal, 10:12. Chargers 3–0. **Drive: 9 plays, 49 yards, 4:48.**
- MIA – DeVante Parker 34-yard pass from Josh Rosen (Jason Sanders kick), 6:32. Dolphins 7–3. **Drive: 6 plays, 75 yards, 3:40.**
- LAC – Troymaine Pope 13-yard pass from Philip Rivers (Ty Long kick), 2:45. Chargers 10–7. **Drive: 7 plays, 75 yards, 3:47.**

**Second quarter**

- MIA – Jason Sanders 30-yard field goal, 11:10. Tied 10–10. **Drive: 12 plays, 67 yards, 6:35.**
- LAC – Austin Ekeler 18-yard pass from Philip Rivers (Ty Long kick), 0:43. Chargers 17–10. **Drive: 8 plays, 60 yards, 2:51.**

**Third quarter**

- LAC – Ty Long 45-yard field goal, 1:22. Chargers 20–10. **Drive: 16 plays, 66 yards, 10:33.**

**Fourth quarter**

- LAC – Austin Ekeler 1-yard run (Ty Long kick), 11:20. Chargers 27–10. **Drive: 7 plays, 56 yards, 3:29.**
- LAC – Ty Long 51-yard field goal, 7:21. Chargers 30–10. **Drive: 6 plays, 15 yards, 3:07.**

**Top passers**

- LAC – Philip Rivers – 24/30, 310 yards, 2 TD
- MIA – Josh Rosen – 17/24, 180 yards, TD, INT

**Top rushers**

- LAC – Austin Ekeler – 18 rushes, 60 yards, TD
- MIA – Kenyan Drake – 9 rushes, 44 yards

**Top receivers**

- LAC – Dontrelle Inman – 5 receptions, 76 yards
- MIA – DeVante Parker – 4 receptions, 70 yards, TD

Dolphins’ quarterback Josh Rosen led the Dolphins to their first lead of the season, 7-3, early in the game. By halftime, the Chargers led by a score of 17-10. After that, it was all Chargers as Bolts’ quarterback Philip Rivers tallied two touchdowns and 310 yards passing. This was the first time the Dolphins had lost at home to the Chargers since the 1982 Epic in Miami game, when the Chargers were still based in San Diego.

==== Week 6: vs. Washington Redskins ====
Week Six: Washington Redskins at Miami Dolphins – Game summary

Quarter	1	2	3	4	Total
**Redskins**	0	7	10	0	**17**
Dolphins	0	3	0	13	**16**

at Hard Rock Stadium, Miami Gardens, Florida

- Date: October 13
- Game time: 1:00 p.m. EDT
- Game weather: Cloudy, 84 °F (29 °C)
- Game attendance: 59,808
- Referee: Shawn Smith
- TV announcers (Fox): Sam Rosen, Ronde Barber and Lindsay Czarniak
- Recap, Game Book

Game information

**First quarter**

- No scoring plays.

**Second quarter**

- WAS – Terry McLaurin 25-yard pass from Case Keenum (Dustin Hopkins kick), 11:34. Redskins 7–0. **Drive: 8 plays, 93 yards, 3:40.**
- MIA – Jason Sanders 39-yard field goal, 1:07. Redskins 7–3. **Drive: 10 plays, 63 yards, 5:06.**

**Third quarter**

- WAS – Terry McLaurin 33-yard pass from Case Keenum (Dustin Hopkins kick), 9:42. Redskins 14–3. **Drive: 6 plays, 70 yards, 3:32.**
- WAS – Dustin Hopkins 21-yard field goal, 4:15. Redskins 17–3. **Drive: 8 plays, 31 yards, 4:02.**

**Fourth quarter**

- MIA – Kalen Ballage 1-yard run (Jason Sanders kick), 10:56. Redskins 17–10. **Drive: 9 plays, 55 yards, 3:59.**
- MIA – DeVante Parker 11-yard pass from Ryan Fitzpatrick (pass failed), 0:06. Redskins 17–16. **Drive: 9 plays, 75 yards, 1:56.**

**Top passers**

- WAS – Case Keenum – 13/25, 166 yards, 2 TD
- MIA – Ryan Fitzpatrick – 12/18, 132 yards, TD

**Top rushers**

- WAS – Adrian Peterson – 23 rushes, 118 yards
- MIA – Kenyan Drake – 10 rushes, 40 yards

**Top receivers**

- WAS – Terry McLaurin – 4 receptions, 100 yards, 2 TD
- MIA – Mike Gesicki – 3 receptions, 51 yards

Josh Rosen was benched in the third quarter after an ineffective performance, throwing for just 85 yards and two interceptions on 25 passing attempts. Though the Redskins took an early 17–3 lead under a strong performance from running back Adrian Peterson, the Dolphins cut the deficit once Ryan Fitzpatrick took over at quarterback as he led Miami to two fourth quarter touchdowns. However, the Dolphins attempted a two-point conversion after their second touchdown and failed, sealing a 17–16 loss. This game was dubbed by many as the "Tank Bowl", this was the first time since 2004 that two winless teams met in Week 6 or later. Miami dropped to 0–5 for the first time since 2011. The Dolphins recorded their first home loss to the Redskins.

==== Week 7: at Buffalo Bills ====
Week Seven: Miami Dolphins at Buffalo Bills – Game summary

Quarter	1	2	3	4	Total
Dolphins	0	14	0	7	**21**
**Bills**	6	3	0	22	**31**

at New Era Field, Orchard Park, New York

- Date: October 20
- Game time: 1:00 p.m. EDT
- Game weather: Mostly sunny, 65 °F (18 °C)
- Game attendance: 68,340
- Referee: Carl Cheffers
- TV announcers (CBS): Andrew Catalon and James Lofton
- Recap, Game Book

Game information

**First quarter**

- BUF – Steven Hauschka 39-yard field goal, 10:54. Bills 3–0. **Drive: 10 plays, 54 yards, 4:06.**
- BUF – Steven Hauschka 43-yard field goal, 3:48. Bills 6–0. **Drive: 7 plays, 45 yards, 3:16.**

**Second quarter**

- MIA – Kalen Ballage 3-yard run (Jason Sanders kick), 14:49. Dolphins 7–6. **Drive: 8 plays, 75 yards, 3:59.**
- BUF – Steven Hauschka 45-yard field goal, 10:06. Bills 9–7. **Drive: 9 plays, 49 yards, 4:43.**
- MIA – DeVante Parker 12-yard pass from Ryan Fitzpatrick (Jason Sanders kick), 5:51. Dolphins 14–9. **Drive: 7 plays, 75 yards, 4:15.**

**Third quarter**

- No scoring plays.

**Fourth quarter**

- BUF – John Brown 20-yard pass from Josh Allen (Josh Allen run), 13:50. Bills 17–14. **Drive: 12 plays, 98 yards, 6:11.**
- BUF – Cole Beasley 3-yard pass from Josh Allen (Steven Hauschka kick), 6:31. Bills 24–14. **Drive: 3 plays, 16 yards, 1:26.**
- MIA – Ryan Fitzpatrick 11-yard run (Jason Sanders kick), 1:45. Bills 24–21. **Drive: 11 plays, 60 yards, 2:14.**
- BUF – Micah Hyde 45-yard kickoff return (Steven Hauschka kick), 1:38. Bills 31–21.

**Top passers**

- MIA – Ryan Fitzpatrick – 23/35, 282 yards, TD, INT
- BUF – Josh Allen – 16/26, 202 yards, 2 TD

**Top rushers**

- MIA – Mark Walton – 14 rushes, 66 yards
- BUF – Frank Gore – 11 rushes, 55 yards

**Top receivers**

- MIA – Preston Williams – 6 receptions, 82 yards
- BUF – John Brown – 5 receptions, 83 yards, TD

Ryan Fitzpatrick returned to the starting lineup against divisional rival Buffalo, whom he played for from 2009 to 2012. He had a strong second-quarter performance, which led to Miami holding only its second lead over an opponent during the season with a 14–9 halftime advantage, but the Bills rallied after CB Tre'Davious White intercepted Fitzpatrick in the third quarter. The Bills went on to score 22 points in the fourth quarter. With the 31–21 loss, Miami fell to 0–6.

==== Week 8: at Pittsburgh Steelers ====
Week Eight: Miami Dolphins at Pittsburgh Steelers – Game summary

Quarter	1	2	3	4	Total
Dolphins	14	0	0	0	**14**
**Steelers**	0	10	7	10	**27**

at Heinz Field, Pittsburgh, Pennsylvania

- Date: October 28
- Game time: 8:15 p.m. EDT
- Game weather: Clear, 59 °F (15 °C)
- Game attendance: 59,244
- Referee: Ronald Torbert
- TV announcers (ESPN): Joe Tessitore, Booger McFarland, Lisa Salters and John Parry
- Recap, Game Book

Game information

**First quarter**

- MIA – Albert Wilson 5-yard pass from Ryan Fitzpatrick (Jason Sanders kick), 10:55. Dolphins 7–0. **Drive: 4 plays, 26 yards, 2:00.**
- MIA – Allen Hurns 12-yard pass from Ryan Fitzpatrick (Jason Sanders kick), 1:34. Dolphins 14–0. **Drive: 11 plays, 63 yards, 6:00.**

**Second quarter**

- PIT – Chris Boswell 42-yard field goal, 2:45. Dolphins 14–3. **Drive: 12 plays, 70 yards, 6:20.**
- PIT – Diontae Johnson 45-yard pass from Mason Rudolph (Chris Boswell kick), 0:17. Dolphins 14–10. **Drive: 6 plays, 50 yards, 0:56.**

**Third quarter**

- PIT – JuJu Smith-Schuster 26-yard pass from Mason Rudolph (Chris Boswell kick), 3:16. Steelers 17–14. **Drive: 12 plays, 97 yards, 7:47.**

**Fourth quarter**

- PIT – James Conner 9-yard run (Chris Boswell kick), 12:01. Steelers 24–14. **Drive: 5 plays, 53 yards, 3:17.**
- PIT – Chris Boswell 41-yard field goal, 5:32. Steelers 27–14. **Drive: 4 plays, −1 yards, 1:41.**

**Top passers**

- MIA – Ryan Fitzpatrick – 21/34, 190 yards, 2 TD, 2 INT
- PIT – Mason Rudolph – 20/36, 251 yards, 2 TD, INT

**Top rushers**

- MIA – Mark Walton – 11 rushes, 35 yards
- PIT – James Conner – 23 rushes, 145 yards, TD

**Top receivers**

- MIA – DeVante Parker – 6 receptions, 59 yards
- PIT – JuJu Smith-Schuster – 5 receptions, 103 yards, TD

The Ryan Fitzpatrick-led Dolphins' offense came out with a surprising 14–0 lead in the first quarter, but the Steelers scored 27 unanswered points to win behind strong performances from quarterback Mason Rudolph, running back James Conner and receiver JuJu Smith-Schuster. Former Dolphins' safety Minkah Fitzpatrick, who had been traded to the Steelers several weeks earlier, intercepted the Dolphins twice during the game. With the loss, Miami continued its winless streak to fall to 0–7.

==== Week 9: vs. New York Jets ====
Week Nine: New York Jets at Miami Dolphins – Game summary

Quarter	1	2	3	4	Total
Jets	7	5	3	3	**18**
**Dolphins**	0	21	3	2	**26**

at Hard Rock Stadium, Miami Gardens, Florida

- Date: November 3
- Game time: 1:00 p.m. EST
- Game weather: Mostly cloudy, 85 °F (29 °C)
- Game attendance: 59,229
- Referee: Walt Anderson
- TV announcers (CBS): Spero Dedes, Adam Archuleta and AJ Ross
- Recap, Game Book

Game information

**First quarter**

- NYJ – Jamison Crowder 12-yard pass from Sam Darnold (Sam Ficken kick), 9:37. Jets 7–0. **Drive: 11 plays, 75 yards, 5:23.**

**Second quarter**

- MIA – Preston Williams 12-yard pass from Ryan Fitzpatrick (Jason Sanders kick), 14:48. Tied 7–7. **Drive: 7 plays, 61 yards, 2:17.**
- MIA – Devante Parker 17-yard pass from Ryan Fitzpatrick (Jason Sanders kick), 6:14. Dolphins 14–7. **Drive: 12 plays, 84 yards, 5:16.**
- MIA – Preston Williams 5-yard pass from Ryan Fitzpatrick (Jason Sanders kick), 1:51. Dolphins 21–7. **Drive: 7 plays, 56 yards, 2:46.**
- NYJ – Ryan Fitzpatrick tackled in end zone by James Burgess for a safety, 0:47. Dolphins 21–9.
- NYJ – Sam Ficken 52-yard field goal, 0:02. Dolphins 21–12. **Drive: 4 plays, 16 yards, 0:45.**

**Third quarter**

- NYJ – Sam Ficken 40-yard field goal, 6:46. Dolphins 21–15. **Drive: 9 plays, 39 yards, 4:56.**
- MIA – Jason Sanders 26-yard field goal, 1:00. Dolphins 24–15. **Drive: 11 plays, 68 yards, 5:46.**

**Fourth quarter**

- MIA – Sam Darnold aborted. Jonotthan Harrison fumble out of bounds in end zone for a safety, 6:29. Dolphins 26–15.
- NYJ – Sam Ficken 29-yard field goal, 0:15. Dolphins 26–18. **Drive: 14 yards, 81 yards, 2:35.**

**Top passers**

- NYJ – Sam Darnold – 27/39, 260 yards, TD, INT
- MIA – Ryan Fitzpatrick – 24/36, 288 yards, 3 TD

**Top rushers**

- NYJ – Le'Veon Bell – 17 rushes, 66 yards
- MIA – Mark Walton – 12 rushes, 29 yards

**Top receivers**

- NYJ – Jamison Crowder – 8 receptions, 83 yards, TD
- MIA – Mike Gesicki – 6 receptions, 95 yards

In Jets' head coach Adam Gase's first return to Miami since being fired from the Dolphins the season prior, the Dolphins came out and won their first game of the season behind three touchdown passes from Ryan Fitzpatrick and sloppy play from the Jets. The win was costly, however, as the Dolphins lost leading receiver Preston Williams for the season with a torn ACL during the game.

==== Week 10: at Indianapolis Colts ====
Week Ten: Miami Dolphins at Indianapolis Colts – Game summary

Quarter	1	2	3	4	Total
**Dolphins**	3	7	0	6	**16**
Colts	0	0	6	6	**12**

at Lucas Oil Stadium, Indianapolis, Indiana

- Date: November 10
- Game time: 4:05 p.m. EST
- Game weather: None (retractable roof closed)
- Game attendance: 60,510
- Referee: Clay Martin
- TV announcers (CBS): Greg Gumbel, Trent Green and Melanie Collins
- Recap, Game Book

Game information

**First quarter**

- MIA – Jason Sanders 47-yard field goal, 6:44. Dolphins 3–0. **Drive: 8 plays, 51 yards, 3:45.**

**Second quarter**

- MIA – Ryan Fitzpatrick 11-yard run (Jason Sanders kick), 1:52. Dolphins 10–0. **Drive: 3 plays, 12 yards, 1:34.**

**Third quarter**

- IND – Adam Vinatieri 25-yard field goal, 7:50. Dolphins 10–3. **Drive: 10 plays, 56 yard, 4:24.**
- IND – Adam Vinatieri 39-yard field goal, 0:38. Dolphins 10–6. **Drive: 10 plays, 28 yards, 5:03.**

**Fourth quarter**

- IND – Jack Doyle 1-yard pass from Brian Hoyer (kick failed, wide left), 11:30. Colts 12–10. **Drive: 7 plays, 34 yards, 3:24.**
- MIA – Jason Sanders 48-yard field goal, 5:45. Dolphins 13–12. **Drive: 12 plays, 45 yards, 5:45.**
- MIA – Jason Sanders 48-yard field goal, 3:31. Dolphins 16–12. **Drive: 4 plays, 5 yards, 2:06.**

**Top passers**

- MIA – Ryan Fitzpatrick – 21/33, 169 yards, INT
- IND – Brian Hoyer – 18/39, 204 yards, TD, 3 INT

**Top rushers**

- MIA – Kalen Ballage – 20 carries, 43 yards
- IND – Marlon Mack – 19 carries, 74 yards

**Top receivers**

- MIA – DeVante Parker – 5 receptions, 69 yards
- IND – Eric Ebron – 5 receptions, 56 yards

The Dolphins went to Indianapolis and upset the Colts, who were without starting quarterback Jacoby Brissett, to earn their second win of the season, and improved to 2–7.

==== Week 11: vs. Buffalo Bills ====
Week Eleven: Buffalo Bills at Miami Dolphins – Game summary

Quarter	1	2	3	4	Total
**Bills**	6	17	7	7	**37**
Dolphins	0	14	0	6	**20**

at Hard Rock Stadium, Miami Gardens, Florida

- Date: November 17
- Game time: 1:00 p.m. EST
- Game weather: Cloudy, 62 °F (17 °C)
- Game attendance: 64,187
- Referee: Scott Novak
- TV announcers (CBS): Spero Dedes and Adam Archuleta
- Recap, Game Book

Game information

**First quarter**

- BUF – Stephen Hauschka 51-yard field goal, 12:04. Bills 3–0. **Drive: 7 plays, 42 yards, 2:56.**
- BUF – Stephen Hauschka 34-yard field goal, 4:29. Bills 6–0. **Drive: 11 plays, 27 yards, 5:17.**

**Second quarter**

- BUF – John Brown 40-yard pass from Josh Allen (Stephen Hauschka kick), 13:09. Bills 13–0. **Drive: 5 plays, 81 yards, 2:12.**
- BUF – Stephen Hauschka 21-yard field goal, 7:41. Bills 16–0. **Drive: 7 plays, 62 yards, 3:21.**
- MIA – Kalen Ballage 3-yard run (Jason Sanders kick), 3:39. Bills 16–7. **Drive: 5 plays, 68 yards, 1:57.**
- BUF – Dawson Knox 23-yard pass from Josh Allen (Stephen Hauschka kick), 1:23. Bills 23–7. **Drive: 6 plays, 75 yards, 2:10.**
- MIA – Jakeem Grant 101-yard kickoff return (Jason Sanders kick), 1:09. Bills 23-14.

**Third quarter**

- BUF – Josh Allen 8-yard run (Stephen Hauschka kick), 6:55. Bills 30–14. **Drive: 9 plays, 53 yards, 4:53.**

**Fourth quarter**

- MIA – Jakeem Grant 7-yard run (pass failed), 14:35. Bills 30–20. **Drive: 7 plays, 65 yards, 3:46.**
- BUF – John Brown 9-yard pass from Josh Allen (Stephen Hauschka kick), 10:38. Bills 37–20. **Drive: 8 plays, 62 yards, 3:57.**

**Top passers**

- BUF – Josh Allen – 21/33, 256 yards, 3 TD
- MIA – Ryan Fitzpatrick – 32/45, 323 yards

**Top rushers**

- BUF – Devin Singletary – 15 rushes, 75 yards
- MIA – Kalen Ballage – 9 rushes, 9 yards, TD

**Top receivers**

- BUF – John Brown – 9 receptions, 137 yards, 2 TD
- MIA – DeVante Parker – 7 receptions, 135 yards

For the second time this year, the Bills defeated the Miami Dolphins. Josh Allen scored four touchdowns, one running and three through the air for the victory at Hard Rock Stadium.

==== Week 12: at Cleveland Browns ====
Week Twelve: Miami Dolphins at Cleveland Browns – Game summary

Quarter	1	2	3	4	Total
Dolphins	0	3	14	7	**24**
**Browns**	14	14	0	13	**41**

at FirstEnergy Stadium, Cleveland, Ohio

- Date: November 24
- Game time: 1:00 p.m. EST
- Game weather: Partly Cloudy, 39 °F (4 °C)
- Game attendance: 67,431
- Referee: Brad Rogers
- TV announcers (Fox): Chris Myers, Daryl Johnston and Laura Okmin
- Recap, Game Book

Game information

**First quarter**

- CLE – Jarvis Landry 7-yard pass from Baker Mayfield (Austin Seibert kick), 9:59. Browns 7–0. **Drive: 8 plays, 75 yards, 5:01.**
- CLE – Odell Beckham Jr. 35-yard pass from Baker Mayfield (Austin Seibert kick), 1:51. Browns 14–0. **Drive: 5 plays, 60 yards, 2:54.**

**Second quarter**

- CLE – Jarvis Landry 5-yard pass from Baker Mayfield (Austin Seibert kick), 10:31. Browns 21–0. **Drive: 6 plays, 44 yards, 3:39.**
- CLE – Kareem Hunt 6-yard run (Austin Seibert kick), 1:01. Browns 28–0. **Drive: 9 plays, 73 yards, 4:45.**
- MIA – Jason Sanders 36-yard field goal, 0:00. Browns 28–3. **Drive: 9 plays, 63 yards, 1:01.**

**Third quarter**

- MIA – Mike Gesicki 11-yard pass from Ryan Fitzpatrick (Jason Sanders kick), 9:37. Browns 28–10 . **Drive: 7 plays, 46 yards, 2:57.**
- MIA – Ryan Fitzpatrick 8-yard run (Jason Sanders kick), 0:04. Browns 28–17. **Drive: 11 plays, 64 yards, 4:00.**

**Fourth quarter**

- CLE – Austin Seibert 40-yard field goal, 11:21. Browns 31–17. **Drive: 10 plays, 64 yards, 3:43.**
- CLE – Austin Seibert 26-yard field goal, 6:51. Browns 34–17. **Drive: 8 plays, 67 yards, 2:57.**
- CLE – Nick Chubb 5-yard run (Austin Seibert kick), 3:36. Browns 41–17. **Drive: 4 plays, 38 yards, 2:22.**
- MIA – Allen Hurns 7-yard pass from Ryan Fitzpatrick (Jason Sanders kick), 0:39. Browns 41–24. **Drive: 7 plays, 78 yards, 2:47.**

**Top passers**

- MIA – Ryan Fitzpatrick – 21/39, 214 yards, 2 TD, 2 INT
- CLE – Baker Mayfield – 24/34, 327 yards, 3 TD, INT

**Top rushers**

- MIA – Ryan Fitzpatrick – 5 rushes, 45 yards, TD
- CLE – Nick Chubb – 21 rushes, 106 yards, TD

**Top receivers**

- MIA – Devante Parker – 6 receptions, 91 yards
- CLE – Jarvis Landry – 10 receptions, 148 yards, 2 TD

Browns’ quarterback Baker Mayfield connected on 24 of 34 passing for 327 yards and three touchdowns while suffering only one interception to beat the Dolphins for the third meeting in a row.

==== Week 13: vs. Philadelphia Eagles ====
Week Thirteen: Philadelphia Eagles at Miami Dolphins – Game summary

Quarter	1	2	3	4	Total
Eagles	10	11	7	3	**31**
**Dolphins**	7	7	12	11	**37**

at Hard Rock Stadium, Miami Gardens, Florida

- Date: December 1
- Game time: 1:00 p.m. EST
- Game weather: Partly cloudy, 82 °F (28 °C)
- Game attendance: 65,545
- Referee: Adrian Hill
- TV announcers (Fox): Kenny Albert, Ronde Barber and Peter Schrager
- Recap, Game Book

Game information

**First quarter**

- PHI – Miles Sanders 15-yard pass from Carson Wentz (Jake Elliott kick), 13:54. Eagles 7–0. **Drive: 3 plays, 18 yards, 0:56.**
- PHI – Jake Elliott 48-yard field goal, 10:10. Eagles 10–0. **Drive: 6 plays, 18 yards, 1:10.**
- MIA – DeVante Parker 43-yard pass from Ryan Fitzpatrick (Jason Sanders kick), 3:05. Eagles 10–7. **Drive: 6 plays, 84 yards, 2:40.**

**Second quarter**

- PHI – Jake Elliott 43-yard field goal, 11:09. Eagles 13–7. **Drive: 12 plays, 50 yards, 6:56.**
- MIA – Jason Sanders 1-yard pass from Matt Haack (Jason Sanders kick), 4:40. Dolphins 14–13. **Drive: 13 plays, 75 yards, 6:29.**
- PHI – J. J. Arcega-Whiteside 15-yard pass from Carson Wentz (Carson Wentz–Nelson Agholor pass), 0:06. Eagles 21–14. **Drive: 12 plays, 75 yards, 4:34.**

**Third quarter**

- PHI – Alshon Jeffery 10-yard pass from Carson Wentz (Jake Elliott kick), 11:44. Eagles 28–14. **Drive: 7 plays, 47 yards, 3:16.**
- MIA – DeVante Parker 17-yard pass from Ryan Fitzpatrick (kick failed, wide right), 8:45. Eagles 28–20. **Drive: 6 plays, 75 yards, 2:59.**
- MIA – Mike Gesicki 14-yard pass from Ryan Fitzpatrick (pass failed), 1:10. Eagles 28–26. **Drive: 6 plays, 61 yards, 3:24.**

**Fourth quarter**

- MIA – Patrick Laird 4-yard run (Ryan Fitzpatrick–Patrick Laird pass), 11:06. Dolphins 34–28. **Drive: 9 plays, 96 yards, 3:36.**
- MIA – Jason Sanders 51-yard field goal, 3:37. Dolphins 37–28. **Drive: 13 plays, 50 yards, 5:53.**
- PHI – Jake Elliott 37-yard field goal, 1:51. Dolphins 37–31. **Drive: 7 plays, 56 yards, 1:46.**

**Top passers**

- PHI – Carson Wentz – 28/46, 310 yards, 3 TD, INT
- MIA – Ryan Fitzpatrick – 27/39, 365 yards, 3 TD, INT

**Top rushers**

- PHI – Miles Sanders – 17 rushes, 83 yards
- MIA – Patrick Laird – 10 rushes, 5 yards, TD

**Top receivers**

- PHI – Alshon Jeffery – 9 receptions, 137 yards, TD
- MIA – DeVante Parker – 7 receptions, 159 yards, 2 TD

This was Eagles' running back Jay Ajayi's first return to Miami since the Dolphins traded him during the 2017 season, and the Dolphins came back from a 28-14 second half deficit. The Dolphins improved to 3–9 with the win but were eliminated from playoff contention thanks to the Steelers' victory that same day.

This game is famous for a trick play the Dolphins ran in the 2nd quarter. Down 10-7 with 4th and goal at the 1-yard line, the Dolphins audibled from a field goal formation to an offensive formation with Matt Haack in shotgun facing two rushers with no protection other than the center. The other linemen lined up in threes outside the numbers on both sides of the ball with a receiver behind them to make convoys. Kicker Jason Sanders lined up one-on-one in the left slot. Haack took the snap and immediately rolled to his left and the convoys started to block. The Eagles defenders engaged at the line of scrimmage but let Sanders slip behind the defense, and Haack flipped it to him for the score. The play was the first and, to date, only punter-to-kicker touchdown pass in NFL history.

==== Week 14: at New York Jets ====
Week Fourteen: Miami Dolphins at New York Jets – Game summary

Quarter	1	2	3	4	Total
Dolphins	3	6	3	9	**21**
**Jets**	0	16	0	6	**22**

at MetLife Stadium, East Rutherford, New Jersey

- Date: December 8
- Game time: 1:00 p.m. EST
- Game weather: Mostly sunny, 41 °F (5 °C)
- Game attendance: 78,523
- Referee: Craig Wrolstad
- TV announcers (CBS): Tom McCarthy, Jay Feely and Otis Livingston
- Recap, Game Book

Game information

**First quarter**

- MIA - Jason Sanders 22-yard field goal, 3:06. Dolphins 3-0. **Drive: 16 plays, 92 yards, 8:11.**

**Second quarter**

- NYJ - Robby Anderson 26-yard pass from Sam Darnold (kick failed), 13:45. Jets 6-3. **Drive: 10 plays, 74 yards, 4:21.**
- NYJ - Sam Ficken 37-yard field goal, 11:01. Jets 9-3. **Drive: 7 plays, 25 yards, 2:36.**
- MIA - Jason Sanders 25-yard field goal, 5:41. Jets 9-6. **Drive: 10 plays, 67 yards, 5:20.**
- NYJ - Demaryius Thomas 14-yard pass from Sam Darnold (Sam Ficken kick), 1:55. Jets 16-6. **Drive: 7 plays, 77 yards, 3:46.**
- MIA - Jason Sanders 28-yard field goal, 0:19. Jets 16-9. **Drive: 8 plays, 65 yards, 1:36.**

**Third quarter**

- MIA - Jason Sanders 31-yard field goal, 10:43. Jets 16-12. **Drive: 9 plays, 62 yards, 4:17.**

**Fourth quarter**

- MIA - Jason Sanders 53-yard field goal, 10:52. Jets 16-15. **Drive: 8 plays, 45 yards, 3:51.**
- MIA - Jason Sanders 48-yard field goal, 6:59. Dolphins 18-16. **Drive: 5 plays, 36 yards, 2:18.**
- NYJ - Sam Ficken 42-yard field goal, 4:05. Jets 19-18. **Drive: 9 plays, 51 yards, 2:54.**
- MIA - Jason Sanders 37-yard field goal, 1:33. Dolphins 21-19. **Drive: 9 plays, 56 yards, 2:32.**
- NYJ - Sam Ficken 44-yard field goal, 0:00. Jets 22-21. **Drive: 7 plays, 49 yards, 1:33.**

**Top passers**

- NYJ – Sam Darnold – 20/36, 270 yards, 2 TD, INT
- MIA – Ryan Fitzpatrick – 21/37, 245 yards, INT

**Top rushers**

- NYJ – Bilal Powell – 19 rushes, 74 yards
- MIA – Ryan Fitzpatrick – 7 rushes, 65 yards

**Top receivers**

- NYJ - Robby Anderson - 7 receptions, 117 yards, TD
- MIA – Isaiah Ford – 6 receptions, 92 yards

On a typically cold and windy December afternoon in New Jersey, the Dolphins just couldn't manage to reach the end zone all day. The Fins tallied a total of 21 points via seven field goals, which turned out to be the difference in the game as they lost by a single point. Jets’ quarterback Sam Darnold had a mediocre day, but pulled out an ugly win. This was Dolphins' quarterback Ryan Fitzpatrick's first return to New York since leaving the Jets via free agency following the 2016 season. With the loss the Dolphins fell to 3–10.

==== Week 15: at New York Giants ====
Week Fifteen: Miami Dolphins at New York Giants – Game summary

Quarter	1	2	3	4	Total
Dolphins	0	10	3	7	**20**
**Giants**	0	7	16	13	**36**

at MetLife Stadium, East Rutherford, New Jersey

- Date: December 15
- Game time: 1:00 p.m. EST
- Game weather: Cloudy, 48 °F (9 °C)
- Game attendance: 72,894
- Referee: Jerome Boger
- TV announcers (CBS): Spero Dedes and Adam Archuleta
- Recap, Game Book

Game information

**First quarter**

- No Scoring plays

**Second quarter**

- MIA - DeVante Parker 20-yard pass from Ryan Fitzpatrick (Jason Sanders kick), 9:03. Dolphins 7-0. **Drive: 9 plays, 89 yards, 5:44.**
- NYG - Golden Tate 51-yard pass from Eli Manning (Aldrick Rosas kick), 8:01. Tied 7-7. **Drive: 3 plays, 75 yards, 1:92.**
- MIA - Jason Sanders 24-yard field goal, 0:44. Dolphins 10-7. **Drive: 7 plays, 22 yards, 0:36.**

**Third quarter**

- NYG - Darius Slayton 5-yard pass from Eli Manning (Aldrick Rosas kick), 11:53. Giants 14-10. **Drive: 6 plays, 70 yards, 3:07.**
- MIA - Jason Sanders 47-yard field goal, 8:44. Giants 14-13. **Drive: 5 plays, 22 yards, 1:23.**
- NYG - Patrick Laird tackled in end zone by Sam Beal for a safety. Giants 16-13.
- NYG - Saquon Barkley 1-yard run (Aldrick Rosas kick), 5:17. Giants 23-13. **Drive: 3 plays, 40 yards, 1:03.**

**Fourth quarter**

- NYG - Saquon Barkley 10-yard run (Aldrick Rosas kick), 14:54. Giants 30-13. **Drive: 8 plays, 66 yards, 4:19.**
- NYG - Javorius Allen 1-yard run (kick failed), 4:41. Giants 36-13. **Drive: 5 plays, 44 yards, 1:54.**
- MIA - DeVante Parker 29-yard pass from Ryan Fitzpatrick (Jason Sanders kick), 1:54. Giants 36-20. **Drive: 8 plays, 75 yards, 2:47.**

**Top passers**

- NYG – Eli Manning – 20/28, 283 yards, 2 TD, 3 INT
- MIA – Ryan Fitzpatrick – 23/41, 279 yards, 2 TD

**Top rushers**

- NYG – Saquon Barkley – 24 rushes, 112 yards, 2 TD
- MIA – Patrick Laird – 12 rushes, 46 yards

**Top receivers**

- NYG – Sterling Shepard – 9 receptions, 111 yards
- MIA – DeVante Parker – 4 receptions, 72 yards, 2 TD

The Dolphins were seeking a win over the Giants for the first time since 2003. With the loss, the Dolphins fell to 3–11 and were guaranteed to finish the season with their worst record since 2007, when they went 1–15. The Giants also snapped a nine-game losing streak, in a game that ended up being long-time quarterback Eli Manning's final start as a Giant. Manning announced his retirement from the NFL on January 22, 2020 after 16 years and winning two Super Bowls with the Giants.

==== Week 16: vs. Cincinnati Bengals ====
Week Sixteen: Cincinnati Bengals at Miami Dolphins – Game summary

Quarter	1	2	3	4	OT	Total
Bengals	0	6	6	23	0	**35**
**Dolphins**	14	7	7	7	3	**38**

at Hard Rock Stadium, Miami Gardens, Florida

- Date: December 22
- Game time: 1:00 p.m. EST
- Game weather: Cloudy, 76 °F (24 °C)
- Game attendance: 60,968
- Referee: Brad Allen
- TV announcers (CBS): Andrew Catalon and James Lofton
- Recap, Game Book

Game information

**First quarter**

- MIA – Christian Wilkins 1-yard pass from Ryan Fitzpatrick (Jason Sanders kick), 8:32. Dolphins 7-0. **Drive: 12 plays, 75 yards, 6:28.**
- MIA – DeVante Parker 7-yard pass from Ryan Fitzpatrick (Jason Sanders kick), 5:00. Dolphins 14-0. **Drive: 7 plays, 75 yards, 1:54.**

**Second quarter**

- CIN – Randy Bullock 20-yard field goal, 10:49. Dolphins 14-3. **Drive: 12 plays, 78 yards, 6:29.**
- MIA – Mike Gesicki 31-yard pass from Ryan Fitzpatrick (Jason Sanders kick), 2:20. Dolphins 21-3. **Drive: 6 plays, 87 yards, 2:48.**
- CIN – Randy Bullock 57-yard field goal, 0:02. Dolphins 21-6. **Drive: 8 plays, 46 yards, 0:51.**

**Third quarter**

- MIA – Mike Gesicki 13-yard pass from Ryan Fitzpatrick (Jason Sanders kick), 8:24. Dolphins 28-6. **Drive: 9 plays, 83 yards, 4:34.**
- CIN – Tyler Boyd 34-yard pass from Andy Dalton (pass failed), 3:38. Dolphins 28-12. **Drive: 10 plays, 75 yards, 4:46.**

**Fourth quarter**

- MIA – Myles Gaskin 2-yard run (Jason Sanders kick), 11:12. Dolphins 35-12. **Drive: 9 plays, 45 yards, 4:03.**
- CIN – C. J. Uzomah 8-yard pass from Andy Dalton (Randy Bullock kick), 6:11. Dolphins 35-19. **Drive: 10 plays, 72 yards, 5:01.**
- CIN – Tyler Boyd 3-yard pass from Andy Dalton (Tyler Eifert pass from Andy Dalton), 0:29. Dolphins 35-27. **Drive: 14 plays, 63 yards, 2:38.**
- CIN – Tyler Eifert 25-yard pass from Andy Dalton (Andy Dalton run), 0:00. Tied 35-35. **Drive: 4 plays, 54 yards, 0:29.**

**Overtime**

- MIA – Jason Sanders 37-yard field goal, 0:00. Dolphins 38-35. **Drive: 10 plays, 51 yards, 3:19.**

**Top passers**

- CIN – Andy Dalton – 33/56, 396 yards, 4 TD
- MIA – Ryan Fitzpatrick – 31/52, 419 yards, 4 TD, INT

**Top rushers**

- CIN – Joe Mixon – 21 rushes, 50 yards
- MIA – Myles Gaskin – 16 rushes, 55 yards

**Top receivers**

- CIN – Tyler Boyd – 9 receptions, 128 yards, 2 TD
- MIA – DeVante Parker – 5 receptions, 111 yards, TD

Opposing quarterbacks Andy Dalton and Ryan Fitzpatrick both scored four touchdowns apiece in a close game in South Florida. The Bengals were down 35-12 when they rebounded to tie the game 35-35 and force overtime. Jason Sanders saved the day by booting a 37-yard field goal as the clock ticked down to zero for a Dolphins’ narrow victory.

==== Week 17: at New England Patriots ====
Week Seventeen: Miami Dolphins at New England Patriots – Game summary

Quarter	1	2	3	4	Total
**Dolphins**	3	7	7	10	**27**
Patriots	0	10	7	7	**24**

at Gillette Stadium, Foxborough, Massachusetts

- Date: December 29
- Game time: 1:00 p.m. EST
- Game weather: Partly cloudy, 43 °F (6 °C)
- Game attendance: 65,878
- Referee: Clay Martin
- TV announcers (CBS): Greg Gumbel, Trent Green and Melanie Collins
- Recap, Game Book

Game information

**First quarter**

- MIA – Jason Sanders 27-yard field goal, 1:38. Dolphins 3-0. **Drive: 12 plays, 80 yards, 6:57.**

**Second quarter**

- MIA – Eric Rowe 35-yard interception return (Jason Sanders kick), 10:31. Dolphins 10-0.
- NE – Nick Folk 25-yard field goal, 5:51. Dolphins 10-3. **Drive: 12 plays, 68 yards, 4:40.**
- NE – Sony Michel 4-yard run (Nick Folk kick), 2:05. Tied 10-10. **Drive: 5 plays, 82 yards, 2:17.**

**Third quarter**

- MIA – Ryan Fitzpatrick 2-yard run (Jason Sanders kick), 7:42. Dolphins 17-10. **Drive: 9 plays, 83 yards, 5:22.**
- NE – Elandon Roberts 38-yard pass from Tom Brady (Nick Folk kick), 4:26. Tied 17-17. **Drive: 8 plays, 75 yards, 3:16.**

**Fourth quarter**

- MIA – Jason Sanders 32-yard field goal, 8:29. Dolphins 20-17. **Drive: 9 plays, 49 yards, 3:23.**
- NE – James White 13-yard pass from Tom Brady (Nick Folk kick), 3:53. Patriots 24-20. **Drive: 8 plays, 60 yards, 4:36.**
- MIA – Mike Gesicki 5-yard pass from Ryan Fitzpatrick (Jason Sanders kick), 0:24. Dolphins 27-24. **Drive: 13 plays, 75 yards, 3:29.**

**Top passers**

- MIA – Ryan Fitzpatrick – 28/41, 320 yards, TD
- NE – Tom Brady – 16/29, 221 yards, 2 TD, INT

**Top rushers**

- MIA – Patrick Laird – 11 rushes, 21 yards
- NE – Sony Michel – 18 rushes, 74 yards

**Top receivers**

- MIA – DeVante Parker – 8 receptions, 137 yards
- NE – Mohamed Sanu – 3 receptions, 35 yards

The Dolphins' regular-season finale against the Patriots was head coach Brian Flores' first return to Gillette Stadium since leaving the Patriots to become head coach of the Dolphins following the Patriots Super Bowl LIII victory on February 3, 2019. Flores served in multiple roles with the Patriots after their 2004 Super Bowl-winning season, winning four Super Bowls and serving as linebackers coach from 2016 to 2018 and de facto defensive coordinator during 2018. The Dolphins' stunning victory sealed by a touchdown pass from Ryan Fitzpatrick to Mike Gesicki with 0:29 remaining was one of the biggest upsets of the season. The win combined with a Kansas City Chiefs win denied the Patriots a first-round playoff bye for the first time since 2009, and was the Dolphins' first win in Gillette Stadium since 2008. It also ended up being Patriots' quarterback Tom Brady's final regular season game in a Patriots' uniform, as the Patriots lost to the Tennessee Titans in the Wild Card playoffs the following week, and Brady went on to sign with the Tampa Bay Buccaneers in the offseason after 20 years with the Patriots. Miami finished the season at 5–11.

=== Standings ===
==== Division ====
AFC East
	W	L	T	PCT	DIV	CONF	PF	PA	STK
^{(3)} New England Patriots	12	4	0	.750	5–1	8–4	420	225	L1
^{(5)} Buffalo Bills	10	6	0	.625	3–3	7–5	314	259	L2
New York Jets	7	9	0	.438	2–4	4–8	276	359	W2
Miami Dolphins	5	11	0	.313	2–4	4–8	306	494	W2

==== Conference ====
AFC
#	Team	Division	W	L	T	PCT	DIV	CONF	SOS	SOV	STK
**Division leaders**
1	Baltimore Ravens	North	14	2	0	.875	5–1	10–2	.494	.484	W12
2 (Note: Kansas City claimed the No. 2 seed over New England based on head-to-head victory.)	Kansas City Chiefs	West	12	4	0	.750	6–0	9–3	.510	.477	W6
3	New England Patriots	East	12	4	0	.750	5–1	8–4	.469	.411	L1
4	Houston Texans	South	10	6	0	.625	4–2	8–4	.520	.488	L1
**Wild Cards**
5	Buffalo Bills	East	10	6	0	.625	3–3	7–5	.461	.363	L2
6	Tennessee Titans	South	9	7	0	.563	3–3	7–5	.488	.465	W1
**Did not qualify for the postseason**
7	Pittsburgh Steelers	North	8	8	0	.500	3–3	6–6	.502	.324	L3
8 (Note: Denver finished ahead of Indianapolis and NY Jets based on conference record. Division tiebreak was initially used to eliminate Oakland (see below).) (Note: Denver finished ahead of Oakland based on conference record.)	Denver Broncos	West	7	9	0	.438	3–3	6–6	.510	.406	W2
9 (Note: Oakland and Indianapolis finished ahead of NY Jets based on conference record.) (Note: Oakland finished ahead of Indianapolis based on head-to-head victory.)	Oakland Raiders	West	7	9	0	.438	3–3	5–7	.482	.335	L1
10	Indianapolis Colts	South	7	9	0	.438	3–3	5–7	.492	.500	L1
11	New York Jets	East	7	9	0	.438	2–4	4–8	.473	.402	W2
12 (Note: Jacksonville finished ahead of Cleveland based on record against common opponents. Jacksonville's cumulative record against Cincinnati, Denver, NY Jets, and Tennessee was 4–1, compared to Cleveland's 2–3 cumulative record against the same four teams.)	Jacksonville Jaguars	South	6	10	0	.375	2–4	6–6	.484	.406	W1
13	Cleveland Browns	North	6	10	0	.375	3–3	6–6	.533	.479	L3
14 (Note: LA Chargers finished ahead of Miami based on head-to-head victory.)	Los Angeles Chargers	West	5	11	0	.313	0–6	3–9	.514	.488	L3
15	Miami Dolphins	East	5	11	0	.313	2–4	4–8	.484	.463	W2
16	Cincinnati Bengals	North	2	14	0	.125	1–5	2–10	.553	.406	W1
**Tiebreakers** (Note: When breaking ties for three or more teams under the NFL's rules, they are first broken within divisions, then comparing only the highest ranked remaining team from each division.)
