= Gold plan =

Gold plan may refer to:

- An offering of the United States' Patient Protection and Affordable Care Act defined as covering 80 percent of out-of-pocket costs
- A collection of recipes by the Physicians Committee for Responsible Medicine
- An affiliation level launched in May 2009 by NBCUniversal Television Group
- Gold Plan (sports), a proposal to change how teams are ordered in sports drafts to discourage tanking
