= Sam Hinkie =

American businessman and basketball executive (born 1977)

Samuel Hinkie
- Born: December 1977 (age 48); Netherlands
- Education: University of Oklahoma; Stanford University
- Organization: Philadelphia 76ers
- Title: General manager
- Term: 2013–2016

Samuel Hinkie (born December 1977) is an American businessman and former basketball executive who served as the general manager for the Philadelphia 76ers of the National Basketball Association (NBA) from 2013 to 2016.

Hinkie began his NBA career in 2005 with the Houston Rockets, where he held the positions of vice president and executive vice president before joining Philadelphia. His tenure with the 76ers is noted for his strategy to rebuild the team by trading away their most valuable players in exchange for high picks in the NBA draft. As a result, Philadelphia was accused of intentionally losing games, which eventually led to Hinkie resigning from his position. However, this strategy became popular with fans, who nicknamed it "The Process", and is credited with helping transform the 76ers into postseason contenders after Hinkie's departure.

Hinkie's tenure as GM of the 76ers drew polarizing reactions: some viewed him as uncommunicative and too reliant on data analytics, while others viewed him as a contrarian with a longer-term view than his peers.

== Early life and education ==
Hinkie was born in the Netherlands in December 1977. His father, Ron Hinkie, was an employee of Halliburton at the time of Hinkie's birth. His mother, Sarita Hinkie, was a stay-at-home parent. Hinkie's family moved to Easley, South Carolina when Hinkie was three. When Hinkie was ten years old, the family moved to Marlow, Oklahoma, the hometown of Ron Hinkie, although Ron continued to work overseas. Hinkie was the younger of two siblings; Hinkie's older brother, Bill, died shortly after the family moved to Oklahoma. In 1996, Hinkie graduated from Marlow High School, where he was valedictorian. Hinkie played defensive back for Marlow's football team and point guard for Marlow's basketball team.

Hinkie graduated from the University of Oklahoma, where he served as president of the student business association and chairman of the dean's roundtable, and was named one of the top 60 undergraduates in the country by USA Today. While at Oklahoma, Hinkie met and eventually married fellow student Alison Burness, proposing to her on a bench next to the Arc de Triomphe. Following graduation, Hinkie accepted a job offer from Bain & Company, before taking a job with Bain Capital in Australia. Hinkie earned an MBA from Stanford University, during which time Hinkie advised the San Francisco 49ers and Houston Texans on draft strategies and statistical analysis. Hinkie also began working part-time with the Houston Rockets while attending Stanford.

== Career ==
=== Houston Rockets ===
Following his graduation from Stanford, Hinkie joined the Houston Rockets in 2005 as a special assistant to general manager Carroll Dawson. Hinkie was promoted to vice president in 2007, becoming the youngest vice president in the NBA; in that same year, Daryl Morey became the new Rockets general manager. Hinkie was promoted to executive vice president in 2010. In Houston, Hinkie promoted the use of advanced statistics in professional basketball while "second-in-command" to Morey, another widely known advocate of advanced basketball analytics. While in Houston, Hinkie played a key role in acquiring future starting point guards Kyle Lowry and Patrick Beverley.

=== Philadelphia 76ers ===
During the 2012 NBA offseason, Hinkie interviewed for the vacant position of general manager (GM) of the Philadelphia 76ers, but the Sixers decided to promote Tony DiLeo to the position. The following off-season, the Sixers hired Hinkie to succeed DiLeo as GM and Rod Thorn as president. Hinkie became the third Sixers general manager since owner Josh Harris bought the Sixers in 2011. During Hinkie's tenure, the phrase "trust the process" became a mantra inside the Sixers locker room, and the phrase eventually became popular among fans as well as an expression denoting faith in the Sixers' long-term hopes to compete for a championship. In 2015, ESPN named Hinkie's Sixers as the major professional sports franchise that had most embraced analytics.

Hinkie's first major move took place during the 2013 NBA draft, when Hinkie traded All-Star point guard Jrue Holiday to the New Orleans Pelicans for the Pelicans' top-5 protected 2014 pick and Nerlens Noel. Hinkie also selected future Rookie of the Year Michael Carter-Williams and Arsalan Kazemi in the draft. In August 2013, Hinkie hired former Spurs assistant Brett Brown as the new Sixers coach, replacing Doug Collins, who had stepped down before Hinkie's hiring. Hinkie's first year was marked with accusations that Philadelphia was deliberately losing games in order to get a high pick in the 2014 NBA draft, and the Sixers tied the NBA record for longest losing streak around the time. In two trades at the 2014 NBA trade deadline, Hinkie traded veteran Sixers Evan Turner, Spencer Hawes, and Lavoy Allen, acquiring five second round picks and Henry Sims. After the season, Hinkie traded long-time Sixer Thaddeus Young to the Minnesota Timberwolves for the Miami Heat's top-10 protected 2015 first-round pick, Luc Richard Mbah a Moute, and Alexey Shved.

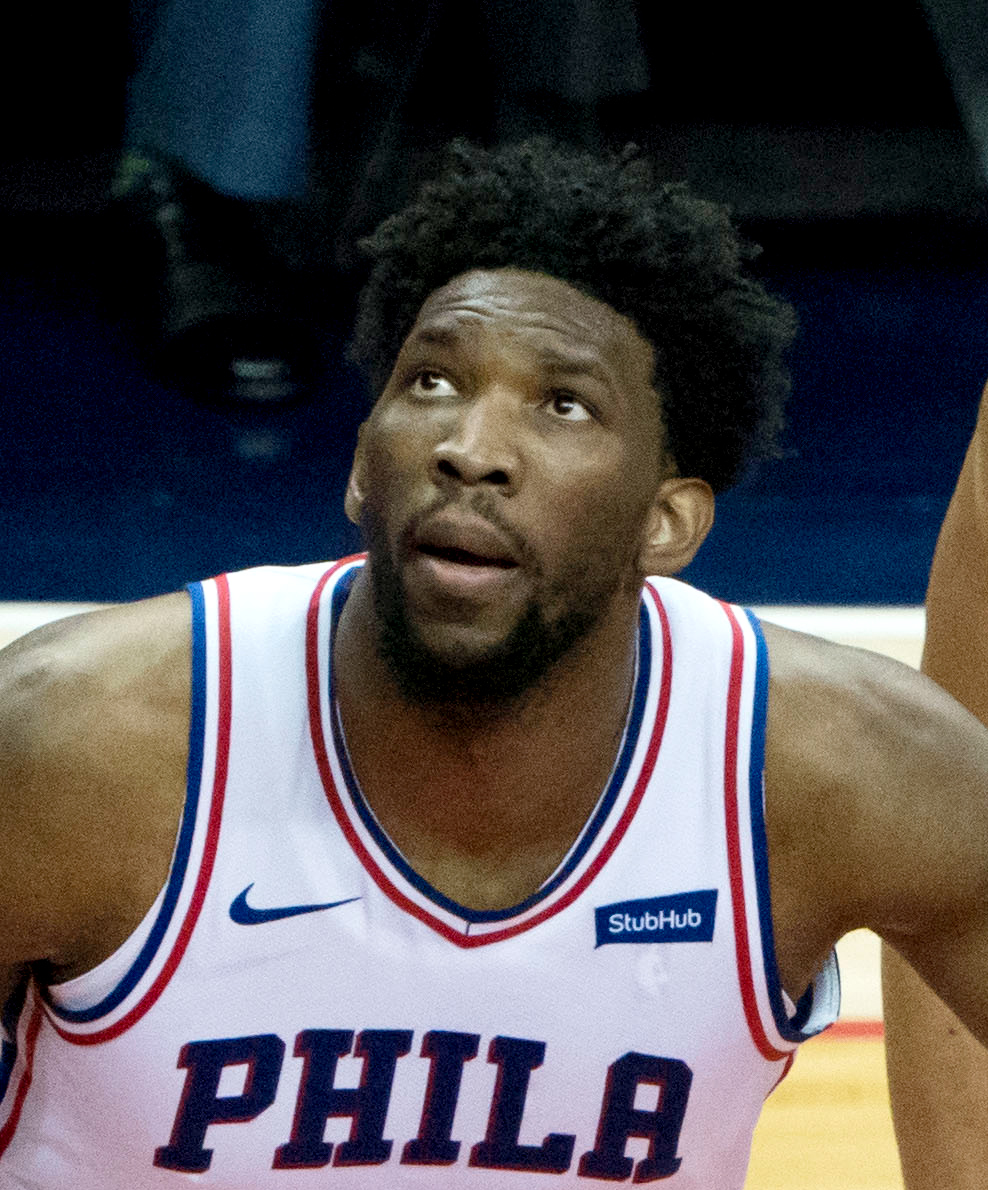
Hinkie selected future NBA MVP Joel Embiid third overall in the 2014 NBA draft

During the 2014 NBA draft, Hinkie selected Joel Embiid (who later nicknamed himself "the Process"), Dario Šarić (after a trade that sent Elfrid Payton to the Orlando Magic), K.J. McDaniels, Jerami Grant, Vasilije Micic, and Jordan McRae; Hinkie also traded the 47th pick in the draft for NBA Development League veteran Pierre Jackson. During the 2014–15 season, Hinkie signed D-League veteran Robert Covington to a four-year contract; alongside Noel and Carter-Williams, Covington was selected to participate in the 2015 Rising Stars Challenge. In three separate deals at the 2015 trade deadline, Hinkie traded Carter-Williams and McDaniels for JaVale McGee, Isaiah Canaan, protected 2015 first-round picks originally owned by the Lakers and the Thunder, and a second round pick. In the 2015 NBA draft, Hinkie selected Jahlil Okafor with the third overall pick, along with Richaun Holmes and J. P. Tokoto in the second round. During the 2015 off-season, Hinkie traded two second round picks for Nik Stauskas, Jason Thompson, Carl Landry, a 2019 first-round pick, and the right to swap first-round picks with Sacramento in 2016 and 2017. Because of that 2015 trade, Philadelphia would swap picks with Sacramento in the 2017 NBA draft, moving from the 5th overall pick to the 3rd overall pick; the team would later acquire the first overall pick of the 2017 draft (Markelle Fultz) using assets acquired during Hinkie's tenure.

After starting the 2015–2016 season with a 1–21 record, the Sixers hired former Phoenix Suns General Manager Jerry Colangelo as Chairman of Basketball Operations. NBA commissioner Adam Silver admitted to personally reaching out to Colangelo on behalf of 76ers ownership. Speculation abounded, sometimes backed up by anonymous league sources, that Silver had placed pressure on 76ers ownership to facilitate regime change due to discomfort with the appearance of tanking. On April 6, 2016, just before the end of the regular season, Hinkie stepped down from his positions with the 76ers.

Days after Hinkie's resignation, Jerry's son Bryan Colangelo was hired as the Sixers' general manager and president of basketball operations. Jerry Colangelo resigned from his post at the same time, but remained as a special advisor to the team. A month after Hinkie's resignation, the 10–72 76ers won the 2016 NBA Draft lottery, and the team selected Ben Simmons with the first overall pick of the 2016 NBA draft. The Sixers also selected Timothé Luwawu-Cabarrot and Furkan Korkmaz with first-round picks that had been acquired during Hinkie's tenure. During the 2016–17 NBA season, Embiid and Šarić both played their first games as Sixers, and both were named as finalists for the NBA Rookie of the Year Award. The young players Hinkie acquired through the draft picks he had around 2014, 2016, and 2017 would later get the 76ers back into the NBA playoffs, going as far as the Eastern Conference Semifinals in the 2017–18 season before losing to the Boston Celtics in five games.

=== Denver Broncos ===
On May 25, 2018, Hinkie met with the Denver Broncos to provide analytical advice after their first losing season since 2010.
