= Matt Haack =

American football player (born 1994)

Profile
- Position: Punter

Personal information
- Born: July 25, 1994 (age 32); Des Moines, Iowa, U.S.
- Listed height: 6 ft 0 in (1.83 m)
- Listed weight: 205 lb (93 kg)

Career information
- High school: Dowling Catholic (West Des Moines, Iowa)
- College: Arizona State (2013–2016)
- NFL draft: 2017: undrafted

Career history
- Miami Dolphins (2017–2020); Buffalo Bills (2021); Indianapolis Colts (2022); Arizona Cardinals (2023)*; Cleveland Browns (2023); Buffalo Bills (2023); New York Giants (2024); Jacksonville Jaguars (2024)*; Denver Broncos (2025)*; Arizona Cardinals (2025); Washington Commanders (2026)*; New England Patriots (2026)*
- * Offseason or practice squad member only

Awards and highlights
- Second-team All-Pac-12 (2016)

Career NFL statistics as of 2025
- Punts: 478
- Punting yards: 21,517
- Average punt: 45.0
- Longest punt: 70
- Inside 20: 179
- Passing touchdowns: 1
- Stats at Pro Football Reference

Matthew Scott Haack (HAHK; born July 25, 1994) is an American professional football punter. He played college football for the Arizona State Sun Devils and signed with the Miami Dolphins as an undrafted free agent in 2017. Haack has also played for several other NFL teams.

== Early life ==
Haack graduated from Dowling Catholic High School in 2013. He was rated by Rivals.com as the No. 15 kicker in the nation and the state of Iowa's No. 10 overall prospect. On September 14, 2018, Haack was inducted into the Dowling Catholic High School/St. Joseph Academy Athletic Hall of Fame for his exemplary high school career.

== College career ==
Haack attended and played college football for Arizona State from 2013 to 2016.

In the 2013 season, Haack shared the punting duties with Alex Garoutte, Dom Vizzare, and Taylor Kelly. He finished with 16 punts for 612 net yards for a 38.3 average.

In the 2014 season, Haack handled most of the punting duties with Taylor Kelly and Mike Bercovici handling the rest of the work. He finished with 53 punts for 2,296 net yards for a 43.3 average.

In the 2015 season, Haack handled all but three punts, which went to Bercovici. He finished with 74 punts for 3,186 net yards for a 43.1 average. Haack finished fifth nationally and fourth in the Pac-12 in averaging 43.1 yards per punt in 2015.

As a senior in 2016, Haack handled all of the team's punts except for three by teammate Manny Wilkins. He had 66 punts for 2,897 net yards for a 44.4 average.

== Professional career ==
Pre-draft measurables
Height	Weight	Arm length	Hand span	Wingspan	40-yard dash	10-yard split	20-yard split
6 ft 0 1/2 in (1.84 m)	202 lb (92 kg)	29 3/8 in (0.75 m)	8 5/8 in (0.22 m)	5 ft 11 3/4 in (1.82 m)	4.57 s	1.62 s	2.62 s
All values from Pro Day

=== Miami Dolphins ===
On May 5, 2017, Haack was signed as an undrafted free agent to a three-year, $1.67 million contract. He earned the Dolphins starting punter job as a rookie, beating out incumbent punter Matt Darr.

On September 17, 2017, Haack made his NFL debut against the Los Angeles Chargers. He had three punts for 130 total yards (43.33 average). Overall, in the 2017 season, he finished with 83 punts for 3,695 net yards for a 44.52 average.

In Week 9 of the 2018 season, Haack was named American Football Conference Special Teams Player of the Week after averaging 44.7 yards on nine punts in a 13–6 win over the New York Jets. Overall, Haack had 87 punts for 3,884 net yards for a 44.64-yard average in the 2018 season.

On December 1, 2019, Haack was the centerpiece of a trick play in which he completed a one-yard touchdown pass to kicker Jason Sanders in the end zone during the 37–31 victory, marking the NFL's first touchdown pass to a kicker since October 16, 1977. Overall, Haack had 69 punts for 3,105 net yards for a 45.00-yard average in the 2019 season.

On April 1, 2020, Haack was re-signed to a one-year, $2.133 million contract. In the 2020 season, he had 68 punts for a 44.7 average.

=== Buffalo Bills ===
On March 18, 2021, Haack signed a three-year contract with the Buffalo Bills. In the 2021 season, Haack had 52 punts for a 42.9 average. He was released on August 22, 2022, after losing the punter position to rookie Matt Araiza.

=== Indianapolis Colts ===
On August 24, 2022, Haack signed a one-year contract with the Indianapolis Colts. In the 2022 season, Haack had 70 punts for a 44.8 average.

=== Arizona Cardinals ===
On May 15, 2023, Haack signed with the Arizona Cardinals. He was waived on August 21, 2023.

=== Cleveland Browns ===
On December 26, 2023, Haack was signed to the practice squad of the Cleveland Browns. Two days later against the Jets, he punted thrice with an average of 51.7 yards. Haack was released on January 2, 2024.

=== Buffalo Bills (second stint) ===
On January 17, 2024, Haack signed with the practice squad of the Bills after their punter Sam Martin suffered a hamstring injury during their playoff game against the Pittsburgh Steelers. He was released three days later, but was re-signed on March 6. On May 31, Haack was released.

=== New York Giants ===
On October 12, 2024, Haack signed with the New York Giants. The following day, he made his 100th NFL appearance in his debut game for the Giants against the Cincinnati Bengals. Haack was released on November 12.

=== Jacksonville Jaguars ===
On December 3, 2024, Haack signed with the Jacksonville Jaguars' practice squad. He was released on December 10.

=== Denver Broncos ===
On March 19, 2025, Haack signed a one-year deal with the Denver Broncos, reuniting with his former special teams coordinator on the Dolphins, Darren Rizzi. Haack was released on May 9.

=== Arizona Cardinals (second stint) ===
On November 19, 2025, Haack signed with the Arizona Cardinals. He replaced punter Blake Gillikin and had 25 punts for a 51.3 yards per punt average.

=== Washington Commanders ===
On July 29, 2026, Haack signed with the Washington Commanders following an injury to Tress Way at the start of training camp. Haack was waived on August 18.

=== New England Patriots ===
On August 24, 2026, Haack signed with the New England Patriots. He was released by the Patriots on August 30 as a part of final roster cuts.

== NFL career statistics ==
Legend
**Bold**	Career high

Season	Team	GP	Punting					
Season	Team	GP	Punts	Yards	Y/P	Net	In20	TB
2017	MIA	16	83	3,695	44.5	40.7	30	5
2018	MIA	16	**87**	**3,884**	44.6	38.4	**35**	6
2019	MIA	16	69	3,105	45.0	41.1	23	2
2020	MIA	16	68	3,040	44.7	39.8	26	2
2021	BUF	17	52	2,230	42.9	38.3	18	**7**
2022	IND	17	70	3,133	44.8	40.2	28	3
2023	CLE	1	3	155	**51.7**	41.7	0	0
2024	NYG	4	21	988	47.0	39.5	9	1
2025	ARI	7	25	1,283	51.3	**43.4**	10	0
Career		110	478	21,517	45.0	39.9	179	26
