= Jason Sanders =

American football player (born 1995)

No. 19 – New York Jets
- Position: Kicker
- Roster status: Active

Personal information
- Born: November 16, 1995 (age 31); Orange, California, U.S.
- Listed height: 5 ft 11 in (1.80 m)
- Listed weight: 186 lb (84 kg)

Career information
- High school: Villa Park (Villa Park, California)
- College: New Mexico (2014–2017)
- NFL draft: 2018: 7th round, 229th overall pick

Career history
- Miami Dolphins (2018–2025); New York Giants (2026)*; New York Jets (2026–present)
- * Offseason or practice squad member only

Awards and highlights
- First-team All-Pro (2020); NFL scoring co-leader (2020) (Note: Tied with Younghoe Koo and Daniel Carlson.); PFWA All-Rookie Team (2018)

Career NFL statistics as of Week 7, 2026
- Field goals made: 200
- Field goals attempted: 236
- Field goal %: 84.7%
- Extra points made: 269
- Extra points attempted: 279
- Extra point %: 96.4%
- Touchdowns: 1
- Points scored: 869
- Longest field goal: 57
- Touchbacks: 432
- Stats at Pro Football Reference

Jason Thomas Sanders (born November 16, 1995) is an American professional football placekicker for the New York Jets of the National Football League (NFL). He played college football for the New Mexico Lobos. He previously played for eight seasons with the Miami Dolphins.

== Early life ==
Sanders attended and played high school football at Villa Park High School.

== College career ==
Sanders attended and played college football at New Mexico from 2014 to 2017. In his collegiate career, he converted 111-of-112 extra point attempts and 25-of-35 field goal attempts, with a career-long of 53 yards.

Out of college, he was touted as the top pro kicking prospect in the country by kicking coach Brent Grablachoff of Kicking World.

=== College statistics ===
Year	School	Conf	Class	Pos	G	XPM	XPA	XP%	FGM	FGA	FG%	Pts
2014	New Mexico	MWC	FR	K	5							
2015	New Mexico	MWC	SO	K	5	22	22	100.0	3	7	42.9	31
2016	New Mexico	MWC	JR	K	13	61	62	98.4	12	13	92.3	97
2017	New Mexico	MWC	SR	K	12	28	28	100.0	10	15	66.7	58
Career	New Mexico					111	112	99.1	25	35	71.4	186

== Professional career ==
Pre-draft measurables
Height	Weight	Arm length	Hand span	Wingspan
5 ft 10 3/4 in (1.80 m)	184 lb (83 kg)	28 3/8 in (0.72 m)	7 7/8 in (0.20 m)	5 ft 10 1/2 in (1.79 m)
All values from Pro Day

=== Miami Dolphins ===
==== 2018 ====
Sanders was selected by the Miami Dolphins in the seventh round, 229th overall, of the 2018 NFL draft. He was one of two kickers to be selected that year, the other being Daniel Carlson of the Minnesota Vikings. He was named the Dolphins' starting kicker following the release of undrafted rookie Greg Joseph.

He made his NFL debut in the season opener against the Tennessee Titans. He converted all three field goal attempts and both extra point attempts in the 27–20 victory.

In Week 6, against the Chicago Bears, he converted the game-winning field goal in overtime.

In 16 games, Sanders made 18 of 20 field goals on the year, and this 90-percent field goal conversion rate was the fifth best in team history. He also converted 35 of 36 extra point attempts. For his efforts, Sanders was named to the Pro Football Writers of America 2018 all-rookie team.

==== 2019 ====
In Week 10, Sanders converted all three field goals and an extra point, accounting for 10 points in a 16–12 win over the Indianapolis Colts, earning himself American Football Conference (AFC) Special Teams Player of the Week.

In Week 13, against the Philadelphia Eagles, Sanders, despite being a kicker, recorded his first career receiving touchdown when he caught a one-yard touchdown pass from punter Matt Haack in the 37–31 win. The play marked the NFL's first touchdown pass to a kicker since October 16, 1977. Sanders won the AFC Special Teams Player of the Week award for his performance.

In Week 14, against the New York Jets, Sanders converted on a franchise-record seven of eight field goal attempts in the 22–21 loss. He was also named AFC Special Teams Player of the Month for his performance in December.

He finished the 2019 season with 29 of 30 extra point attempts converted and 23 of 30 field goal attempts converted.

==== 2020 ====
In Week 5, against the San Francisco 49ers, Sanders was a perfect 5 for 5 on field goal attempts and 4 for 4 on extra point attempts, scoring a total of 19 points, during the 43–17 win, earning AFC Special Teams Player of the Week honors for his performance. He also earned AFC Special Teams Player of the Month for October after converting all 11 field goal attempts and all seven extra point attempts for the month.

In Week 10, against the Los Angeles Chargers, he missed his first kick of the year. He was the last perfect kicker in the NFL. Sanders was named the AFC Special Teams Player of the Month for his performance in November.

In Week 16, Sanders converted both extra point attempts and went 4-for-4 on field goals, including a 44-yard game winner in a 26–25 win over the Las Vegas Raiders, earning AFC Special Teams Player of the Week.

After the 2020 season, he tied with Daniel Carlson and Younghoe Koo for the scoring title. He also received First-team All-Pro honors. He made 36 of 39 field goals and also made all 36 extra point attempts.

==== 2021 ====
On February 16, 2021, Sanders signed a five-year, $22 million contract extension with the Dolphins, making him one of the highest paid kickers in the NFL.

In Week 10, during a prime-time game against the Baltimore Ravens, Sanders hit 3 of 3 field goal attempts and made his only extra point attempt in the 22–10 win.

In Week 18, against the New England Patriots, Sanders converted his two field goal attempts and all three extra point attempts in the 33–24 win.

For the season, Sanders made 23 of 31 field goals and 34 of 35 extra point attempts.

==== 2022 ====
In Week 2, against the Baltimore Ravens, Sanders converted a career-high six extra point attempts in the 42–38 victory. In the 2022 season, Sanders converted 41 of 44 extra point attempts and 26 of 32 field goal attempts.

==== 2023 ====
In Week 3, against the Denver Broncos, Sanders set the NFL record for the most converted extra points in a single game by completing all 10 of his attempts in the 70–20 victory, breaking the previous record of nine which had stood since 1966.

In Week 16, against the Dallas Cowboys, Sanders went 5-for-5 on field goals, including a franchise record three 50+ yard field goals in a single game and a new career long of 57 yards, and converted the team's only extra point, securing a playoff spot for the Dolphins. He finished the 2023 season converting 58 of 59 extra point attempts and 24 of 28 field goal attempts.

==== 2024 ====
In Week 16, Sanders converted all five field goals and two extra points in a 29–17 win over the San Francisco 49ers, earning AFC Special Teams Player of the Week. In the 2024 season, he converted 26-of-28 extra points and 37-of-41 field goal attempts.

==== 2025 ====
On August 26, 2025, the Dolphins placed Sanders on injured reserve due to a hip injury, leading to him missing the entire season.

On March 6, 2026, Sanders was released by the Dolphins after eight years, being the longest tenured Dolphin at the time of his release.

=== New York Giants ===
On March 11, 2026, Sanders signed a one-year contract with the New York Giants. On June 2, Sanders was released by the Giants.

=== New York Jets ===
On June 3, 2026, Sanders was claimed off of waivers by the New York Jets. He was released by the Jets on August 31, and subsequently re-signed to the team's practice squad. On September 29, Sanders was signed to the active roster.

== NFL career statistics ==
Year	Team	GP	Field goals				Extra points			Points
Year	Team	GP	FGA	FGM	Lng	Pct	XPA	XPM	Pct	Points
2018	MIA	16	20	18	50	90.0	36	35	97.2	89
2019	MIA	16	30	23	54	76.7	30	29	96.7	98
2020	MIA	16	39	36	56	92.3	36	36	100.0	144
2021	MIA	17	31	23	51	74.2	35	34	97.1	103
2022	MIA	17	32	26	55	81.3	44	41	93.2	119
2023	MIA	17	28	24	57	85.7	59	58	98.3	130
2024	MIA	17	41	37	57	90.2	28	26	92.9	137
2025	MIA	Did not play due to injury								
2026	NYJ	7	15	13	54	86.7	11	10	90.9	49
Career		123	236	200	57	85.8	279	269	96.4	875
