= Chad O'Shea =

American football player and coach (born 1972)

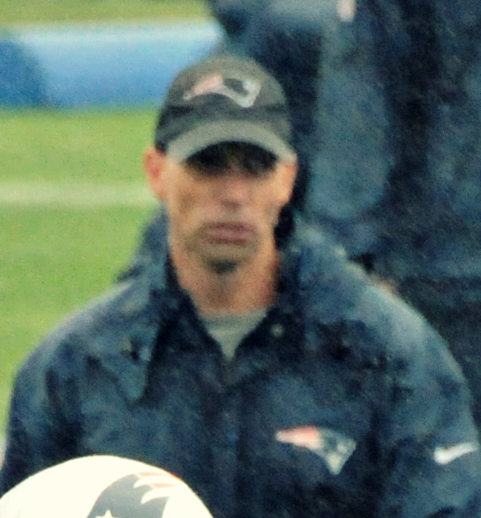
- O'Shea in 2016

Kansas City Chiefs
- Title: Wide receivers coach

Personal information
- Born: December 18, 1972 (age 53); Houston, Texas, U.S.

Career information
- Position: Quarterback
- High school: St. Xavier (Louisville, Kentucky)
- College: Marshall (1991–1993); Houston (1994–1995)

Career history
- Houston (1996-1999); Graduate assistant (1996); Wide receivers coach (1997); Tight ends & special teams coach (1998); Tight ends coach, special teams coach & recruiting coordinator (1999); Southern Miss (2000–2002) Special teams coach & recruiting coordinator; Kansas City Chiefs (2003); Volunteer assistant (2004); Assistant special teams coach (2004-2005); Minnesota Vikings (2006–2008); Offensive assistant (2006); Offensive assistant & wide receivers coach (2007); Offensive assistant, wide receivers coach & assistant special teams coach (2008); New England Patriots (2009–2018) Wide receivers coach; Miami Dolphins (2019) Offensive coordinator; Cleveland Browns (2020–2025) Wide receivers coach & passing game coordinator; Kansas City Chiefs (2026–present) Wide receivers coach

Awards and highlights
- 3× Super Bowl champion (XLIX, LI, LIII)
- Coaching profile at Pro Football Reference

Chad O'Shea (born December 18, 1972) is an American football coach and former player who is the wide receivers coach for the Kansas City Chiefs of the National Football League (NFL). He previously was an assistant coach for the Miami Dolphins, New England Patriots, Minnesota Vikings, and Cleveland Browns.

== College career ==
O'Shea attended Marshall University from 1991 through 1993 before transferring to the University of Houston where he played football as a quarterback from 1994 through 1995.

== Coaching career ==
=== College ===
O'Shea served as a graduate assistant for Houston in 1996 before being promoted to wide receivers coach in 1997. He became tight ends coach and special teams coach in 1998 and added recruiting coordinator to those duties in 1999. In 2000, O'Shea moved to the University of Southern Mississippi, where he served as special teams coach and recruiting coordinator through 2002.

=== Kansas City Chiefs ===
In 2003, O'Shea was a volunteer assistant as an assistant special teams coach for the Kansas City Chiefs under special teams coordinator Frank Gansz Jr., a coach for Houston when O'Shea played there. He became a full-time assistant special teams coach for the Chiefs in 2004, spending two years in that capacity.

=== Minnesota Vikings ===
In 2006, O'Shea joined the Minnesota Vikings as an offensive assistant, working with the wide receivers in 2007 and 2008. Also in 2008, O'Shea added assistant special teams coaching responsibilities.

=== New England Patriots ===
In 2009, O'Shea became the wide receivers coach for the New England Patriots. O'Shea won his first Super Bowl when the Patriots defeated the Seattle Seahawks in Super Bowl XLIX at the end of the 2014 season. On February 5, 2017, O'Shea was part of the Patriots coaching staff that won Super Bowl LI. In the game, the Patriots defeated the Atlanta Falcons by a score of 34–28 in overtime. O'Shea would stay with the Patriots until the 2019 season. He won his third Super Bowl title when the Patriots defeated the Los Angeles Rams in Super Bowl LIII.

=== Miami Dolphins ===
On February 8, 2019, the Miami Dolphins announced O'Shea as their offensive coordinator when he joined Brian Flores with the Dolphins. On December 30, 2019, O'Shea was fired by the Dolphins after one season.

=== Cleveland Browns ===
On January 19, 2020, O'Shea was hired by the Cleveland Browns as their wide receivers coach and passing game coordinator under head coach Kevin Stefanski whom he coached alongside when he was with the Vikings. O'Shea missed the team's week 17 game against the Pittsburgh Steelers in 2020 due to COVID-19 protocols.

=== Kansas City Chiefs ===
On January 19, 2026, the Kansas City Chiefs hired O'Shea to serve as their new wide receivers coach.

== Personal life ==
O'Shea and his wife Melissa have three children: daughters Claire and Grace, and son Michael.
