= Tanking =

Practice of fielding non-competitive teams

Tanking in sports refers to the practice of intentionally fielding non-competitive teams to take advantage of league rules that benefit losing teams. Tanking teams are usually seeking top picks in the next draft, since league rules generally give the highest draft picks to the teams with the worst records in the previous season. Teams that decide to start tanking often do so by trading away star players in order to reduce payroll and bring in younger prospects. While the terms tanking and rebuilding are sometimes used interchangeably, there are differences between the two concepts. In rebuilding, losses may result from trading veterans for assets such as young talent, salary cap space, and draft picks. In tanking, losses are deliberately pursued as the primary strategy for draft positioning.

Tanking is a much more common practice in American sports that utilize closed leagues than open sports leagues in other nations, which typically penalize poor performers using a promotion and relegation system, in which the worst teams after each season are sent to a lower-tiered league and replaced with that league's best teams. Relegation costs teams revenue and makes it more difficult for them to attract top talent, making tanking unfeasible.

Tanking is differentiated from actions taken to achieve a pre-determined result in a specific contest, usually for the purposes of sports betting, thus violating the rules of the game, along with laws, which is more specifically deemed as match fixing.

== Examples ==
One of the first teams to tank was the 1983–84 Houston Rockets, who considered the season lost after starting 20–26 and decided to give more playing time to their lesser talented players in an effort to finish with the worst record in the Western Conference, which would ensure that they would advance to a coin toss with whoever finished with the worst record in the Eastern Conference for the first overall pick in the 1984 draft; the Rockets went 9–27 the rest of the way and finished with a 29–53 record to take the worst record in the Western Conference. The Rockets won the coin toss and used their top pick to draft Hakeem Olajuwon of the University of Houston. Olajuwon would go on to become one of the greatest basketball centers of all time, eventually winning two NBA championships as a member of the Rockets, and the Rockets' tactics played a significant role in the NBA’s decision to adopt a lottery system to determine the first overall pick starting in 1985.

In the 1983–84 NHL season, the Pittsburgh Penguins and New Jersey Devils admitted they wanted to lose in order to get the number one pick in the draft and select Mario Lemieux. The Penguins finished with the worst record and drafted Lemieux; however, the NHL did not immediately institute a draft lottery as the NBA had and continued to have the team with the worst record pick first until 1995.

Tanking did not become prevalent until the 2010s, when teams in all four major American leagues (MLB, NFL, NBA, and NHL) were engaged in various forms of the practice.

The Chicago Cubs and Houston Astros pioneered the practice in MLB in the 2010s, with the Astros finishing with the worst record in baseball by 6 games or more for 3 consecutive years. Both teams used their subsequent draft picks to select star players who led them to championships, as the Cubs won the 2016 World Series and the Astros won in 2017 and 2022. Other teams like the Miami Marlins, Baltimore Orioles, Kansas City Royals, and Detroit Tigers have sought to emulate the strategy by trading away their best players, with the twin goals of drafting and developing younger stars and cutting costs in order to become competitive again several years later. However, tanking is much less effective in baseball because top MLB draft picks are far less likely to succeed than their counterparts in the NBA or NFL.

Sometimes my job is to understand the value of losing. I know that sounds crazy, but if you're an NBA general manager like me, the last place you want to be is in the middle. There are only two outcomes there: Either make the playoffs and be first-round fodder for one of the premier teams or miss the playoffs and pick somewhere around 11th to 14th in the draft. Either way, the odds are that you stay in that middle range. It's a recipe for disaster.

— Anonymous NBA general manager, as told to ESPN's Jeff Goodman, 2013

In 2014, the Australian Football League's Melbourne Football Club were fined $500,000 for their involvement in a 2009 tanking scandal.

One of the most notable examples of tanking in the modern era of professional sports is "The Process", a plan by Sam Hinkie, the GM of the NBA's Philadelphia 76ers, to rebuild the team by intentionally tanking in order to gain draft position. In the three seasons from 2013 to 2016, Philadelphia recorded a total of 47 wins, never surpassing 20 in any year. This included an NBA record 28 game losing streak between the end of the 2014–15 and 15–16 seasons. This poor on-court performance led to a three-year struggle within the organization, which culminated in Hinkie leaving the organization in April 2016. However, as the team lost, they collected valuable assets in the form of draft picks. In the five drafts from 2014 to 2018, the 76ers drafted six times in the top 10 and selected cornerstones Joel Embiid and Ben Simmons in two of those drafts. From 2017 to 2023, Philadelphia won more than 40 games in every season and reached the playoffs each year. However, the team has struggled in the playoffs and has not advanced past the Conference Semifinals since the tanking ended.

When Jon Gruden retook control of the Oakland Raiders prior to the 2018 NFL season he liquidated most of the Raiders' talent, most notably trading five-time Pro Bowler Khalil Mack to the Chicago Bears for two first round draft picks (one of which was used to select Josh Jacobs), leading to accusations that he was intentionally tanking the team in hopes of fielding a competitive team when the Raiders moved to Las Vegas in 2020. The Raiders, who had finished 12–4 and qualified for the playoffs two seasons prior, finished the 2018 season with only four wins, but saw significant improvement in 2019 thanks to strong play from the team's rookies.

The Miami Dolphins were accused of tanking during the 2019 NFL season when new head coach Brian Flores oversaw a similar liquidation of the team's established talent. In September, tackle Laremy Tunsil and safety Minkah Fitzpatrick were sent to contending football teams in exchange for future draft picks; both would subsequently be named to the Pro Bowl. After starting the season 0–7, however, the 2019 Dolphins won 5 of their last 9 games. The victories denied Miami the first overall pick of the 2020 NFL draft, although the team was able to select Alabama quarterback Tua Tagovailoa, who they were rumored to have been deliberately losing games for. The next season, the 2020 Dolphins went 10–6 and missed the playoffs by one game, while the trade of Tunsil allowed them to obtain the third overall pick of the 2021 NFL draft, due to the Texans' bad record. Flores later alleged in a 2022 lawsuit that Dolphins owner Stephen M. Ross offered to pay him $100,000 for each game he lost.

Philadelphia Eagles head coach Doug Pederson faced allegations of deliberately losing the final game of the 2020 NFL season after he replaced starting quarterback Jalen Hurts with backup Nate Sudfeld. When Sudfeld relieved Hurts early in the fourth quarter, the Eagles were facing only a three-point deficit against the Washington Football Team, but Sudfeld committed two consecutive turnovers that helped Washington win 20–14. As a result, the 4–11–1 Eagles moved up from ninth overall to sixth overall in the 2021 NFL draft, while Washington clinched the NFC East, which would have been clinched by the New York Giants if Philadelphia won. Pederson denied the allegations, stating he intended to give Sudfeld the opportunity to play, although he was fired a week after the game.

The Oakland Athletics were accused of tanking when they traded away most of their talented players like Matt Olson, Matt Chapman, Chris Bassitt, and Sean Manaea prior to the 2022 MLB season. This came after a new collective bargaining agreement was agreed to in order to end the lockout that introduced the draft lottery to discourage tanking for top draft picks. However, this was financially motivated by team owner John J. Fisher as the Athletics fielded a team with the second-lowest opening day payroll in the majors at $48 million, down from their payroll from last season at $83 million. Despite finishing the season last in attendance and the second-worst record in the majors at 60-102, the team turned in a profit of $62.2 million in 2022 due to the increased revenue sharing combined with the low payroll, which is fifth among all teams. In addition, this tanking campaign was believed to be designed in order to discourage fan attendance in Oakland for Fisher to use as justification to MLB for moving the team to Las Vegas. This method of tanking is illegal in the NFL, NBA, and NHL since those leagues have a salary floor that require teams to spend a minimum amount on player contracts to prevent owners from profiting by cutting payroll, but the MLB does not have a salary floor and critics argue that the league needs it to truly end tanking.

The Dallas Mavericks were accused of tanking during the final few games of the 2023 NBA season. The Mavericks entered the season with high aspirations, but following a slide by the team to 11th place in the Western Conference and out of the NBA play-in tournament, in their penultimate game of the season against the Chicago Bulls, the Mavericks rested star players Luka Dončić and Kyrie Irving along with many starters. The Mavericks lost the game, knocking them out of playoff contention. The Mavericks owed their draft pick to the New York Knicks, but it was top-10 protected – the loss made them more likely to keep it in the 2023 NBA draft. Head coach Jason Kidd admitted after the game that the decision to rest players was made by team owner Mark Cuban and general manager Nico Harrison. After the season, they were fined $750,000 for their actions.

== Encouragement by fans ==
As the NFL does not have a draft lottery, coverage of some NFL drafts has been dominated by the presence of a highly touted player who is widely expected to be among the first picked, portraying them as a "sweepstakes" prize for the league's worst team. The 2009 NFL draft was nicknamed "The Matthew Stafford Sweepstakes" as Georgia quarterback Matthew Stafford was widely expected to be the first player drafted regardless of which team held the first overall pick. Stafford was indeed drafted first overall, by the Detroit Lions, who had gone winless during the previous season. This has led to public campaigns where fans of poor performing teams actively encourage losing in order to improve the team's draft position when such a player is expected to be in the next draft.

The first widely known example of such a campaign was "Suck for Luck" during the 2011 NFL season, in which fans of mediocre teams encouraged losing in hopes of drafting Stanford quarterback Andrew Luck, who was considered one of the NFL's best quarterback prospects. The campaign was widely criticized by sports writers, who noted that it is not in the nature of professional athletes to intentionally lose games and that poor performance should bring punishment, not encouragement. The campaign was denounced by Hall of Fame quarterback Dan Marino when fans of his former team, the Miami Dolphins, began participating in it and Luck himself, who called it "stupid". Nonetheless, a similar "Tank for Tua" campaign emerged in the 2019 NFL season, with fans of poor performing teams encouraging losing in hopes of drafting Alabama quarterback Tua Tagovailoa. However, when Tagovailoa suffered a season ending hip injury that put his chances of declaring for the 2020 NFL draft in question, the campaign turned to LSU quarterback Joe Burrow and Ohio State defensive end Chase Young, respectively becoming "Bungle for Burrow" and "Choke for Chase".

Since acquiring the first overall selection requires having the worst overall record, fans have responded negatively to teams lowering their draft position by winning games. After the Philadelphia Eagles lost their first 11 games in 1968, fans anticipated them obtaining USC running back O. J. Simpson first overall in the upcoming draft. However, the Eagles won two of their last three games, which resulted in the Buffalo Bills obtaining the first overall pick and drafting Simpson. During the final game of the season, Eagles fans vented their frustrations with the team by booing and throwing snowballs at a fan dressed as Santa Claus. A similar situation occurred during the 2020 NFL season when New York Jets fans were angered by the team winning their first game in Week 15. Jets fans believed the team would be able to select Clemson quarterback Trevor Lawrence first overall in the 2021 NFL draft, but the victory gave the first overall selection to the Jacksonville Jaguars. The Jaguars would ultimately clinch the first overall selection the following week, leading to them drafting Lawrence.

Similar draft coverage and reaction by fans has been seen in the National Hockey League. Normally, players selected in the NHL Entry Draft continue to play in minor leagues (often their team's affiliate in the developmental American Hockey League) before they reach the NHL, if they reach the NHL at all. Thus, when a draft contains an NHL-ready player who could make an immediate impact for their team, they are coveted. Examples of this include the 1984 NHL entry draft, with multiple teams seeking entry into the lottery for the chance to draft Mario Lemieux, or the 2005 NHL entry draft, which was nicknamed the "Sidney Crosby Sweepstakes" as it was believed the winner of that year's lottery would immediately draft Sidney Crosby. The 2015 NHL entry draft contained two highly touted prospects, Connor McDavid and Jack Eichel, effectively guaranteeing the last-place team would land an elite player; thus, fans of mediocre teams encouraged losing throughout the 2014–15 NHL season. This was most prominently seen among Buffalo Sabres fans, who actively cheered for the opposing team at home games while The Buffalo News regularly published the "McEichel Derby", which tracked the Sabres' ranking among the league's worst teams. First Niagara Center infamously erupted in cheers when Sam Gagner of the Phoenix Coyotes scored an overtime-winning goal in a late season game, as the low-ranked Coyotes were seen as a major "threat" to Buffalo landing a top-two pick. The Sabres finished the season with the worst overall record, securing the second-overall pick which they used to draft Eichel. The NHL revised their draft the following season in response, removing the second pick guarantee for the league's worst team and making all 14 teams who miss the playoffs eligible to win a top-three pick through the draft lottery. Eichel's six years in Buffalo were marred by team underperformance and lack of chemistry (the team failed to make the playoffs in any season with Eichel), and he was traded in late 2021 to the Vegas Golden Knights. Similarly, multiple fanbases encouraged their teams to tank during the 2022–23 NHL season in the hopes that they would be the ones to draft Connor Bedard, who was considered the greatest prospect in hockey since Sidney Crosby. The phrase "Tank Hard for Bedard" came into common usage among fans of teams with miserable records such as the Columbus Blue Jackets and the Chicago Blackhawks, the latter of whom ended up selecting Bedard first overall.

Fans of the Philadelphia 76ers adopted the mantra "Trust the Process" when the team was tanking from 2013 to 2016.

== Analytics of tanking ==
The term 'inverse analytics' was first introduced in 2018. The 2018 NBA draft featured several highly sought-after prospects, including eventual top picks Deandre Ayton, Marvin Bagley III, Luka Dončić, and Trae Young. In order to contend for the rights to these players, NBA teams allegedly began intentionally losing to the point that an NBA executive reportedly told ESPN that "inverse analytics" were being used. The evidence of this comes from the Dallas Mavericks, who used many questionable lineups toward the end of the year. For example, with less than five minutes to go and down by one point against the Lakers, the Mavericks used a lineup that had played together for a total of 12 minutes during the first three and a half months of the season. Mavericks owner Mark Cuban was fined $600,000 for openly commenting on the benefits of tanking. Mark Cuban was fined $750,000 during the 2022-2023 NBA Season when the Mavericks sat out starters during a key game for a chance to qualify for the play-in tournament.

== Disadvantages ==
Acquiring high draft picks does not guarantee that teams will become consistent playoff contenders, let alone win championships or become dynasties. For example, the 2008 Detroit Lions acquired the first overall pick in the 2009 NFL draft after infamously becoming the first team to go 0-16 since the NFL expanded the season to 16 games. The Lions selected quarterback Matthew Stafford with that pick. In Stafford's 12 seasons as Detroit's starting quarterback, the team made the playoffs three times, but did not win a single division title or playoff game during that time period. After the 2020 season, the Lions traded Stafford to the Los Angeles Rams for quarterback Jared Goff and multiple draft picks. Stafford would help the Rams win Super Bowl LVI in his first year away from Detroit, while in 2023, Goff would help the Lions win their first division title and playoff games in at least three decades.

Similarly, the Cleveland Browns acquired the first overall picks in the 2017 and 2018 NFL drafts after finishing with records of 1–15 and 0–16 in the 2016 and 2017 seasons, respectively. The Browns selected defensive end Myles Garrett and quarterback Baker Mayfield with those picks. Although the Browns would improve in the following six seasons, they made two playoff appearances, won zero division titles, and won only one playoff game during that time period. In fact, Mayfield was traded away for a conditional fifth-round pick after the 2021 season.

On the other hand, fielding bad teams to acquire high draft picks is not necessary for building a perennial championship contender. For example, after the Kansas City Chiefs hired Andy Reid to be their new head coach after the 2012 season, the team would make the playoffs in three of the next four seasons, including a 12–4 record and a division title in the 2016 season. During the following year's NFL draft, the Chiefs, who were picking at the back end of the first round due to their 2016 success, traded up with the Buffalo Bills to select quarterback Patrick Mahomes tenth overall. Mahomes, who was not regarded as a surefire quarterback prospect at the time he was drafted, became a main contributor to the Chiefs' dynasty in the 2020s, as he has led the team to seven consecutive division titles, seven consecutive AFC Championship appearances, five Super Bowl appearances, and three Super Bowl championships since he became Kansas City's starting quarterback in 2018. Other key contributors to the Chiefs' dynasty, such as defensive tackle Chris Jones and tight end Travis Kelce, were drafted in the second and third rounds, respectively, while wide receiver Tyreek Hill, who was a key part of the Chiefs' Super Bowl LIV victory and success from 2016 to 2021, was drafted in the fifth round.

While tanking can sometimes be a successful strategy in eventually building a winning team, it alienates fans in the midst of the rebuilding process as fans are frustrated by losing teams. During the Houston Astros' rebuilding years of 2011 to 2013, when they lost an average of 108 games per season, the team's attendance was cut in half, with one game having a television rating of 0.0. The Buffalo Sabres have also seen dips in attendance since their rebuilding years in the 2010s, and didn't make the playoffs at all since the alleged tank of 2014–15 until 2025–26, and have also been described as a "toxic environment".

Tanking can also lead to strife with players' unions, as tanking teams choose rookies on inexpensive contracts over free agents wanting multimillion-dollar deals.

Leagues also see tanking as a threat to their existing revenue streams. For example, the NBA sees this as a potentially major issue, since one of the largest drivers of revenue generation for professional leagues is gate receipts. Tanking has been shown to drastically reduce attendance and thus hurt the NBA's bottom line.

== Response ==
The NBA, NHL, and MLB have responded to the phenomenon in recent years by changing their draft from reverse-order to a lottery formula which is only loosely tied to the previous season's standings, though this has not stopped the practice entirely. Some observers have called for leagues to adopt a European-style promotion and relegation system, in which the worst teams are demoted to a minor league, to make tanking less attractive. The NBA has fined executives and owners for referencing the merits of losing.

In response to concerns about tanking, the NBA changed the way teams are allocated draft picks. In 2018, the league leveled the draft lottery odds, giving the worst team a lower chance of getting the number one overall pick. In theory, this change serves to dissuade teams from intentionally losing.

The 2022 revival of the United States Football League instituted a rule that if the two teams at the bottom of the league standings are scheduled to face each other in the last week of the regular season, then the winner of that game will be awarded first place in that league's draft order the next year; this rule was carried over when the USFL merged with the XFL to form the United Football League. The rule has been invoked twice, first in 2022 and again in 2024.

In 2022, MLB introduced a lottery system, implemented as part of the 2022 Collective Bargaining Agreement (CBA) to deter tanking. It determines the first six picks of the draft, featuring only teams that failed to make the postseason in the prior year.

In 2026, the NBA Board of Governors passed the "3-2-1 lottery" anti-tanking reform. Starting with the 2027 draft, the lottery expands from 14 to 16 teams and introduces "draft relegation," giving the three worst teams worse odds for the No. 1 pick than teams finishing 4th through 10th. It was considered the most concerted effort by a North American sports league to curb tanking after an unprecedented season of said act.

The Gold Plan is a proposed plan to discourage tanking by having the draft order be determined by the number of points a team earns after being mathematically eliminated from qualifying for the playoffs.
