= Preston Williams =

American football player (born 1997)

Profile
- Position: Wide receiver

Personal information
- Born: March 27, 1997 (age 29); Lovejoy, Georgia, U.S.
- Listed height: 6 ft 4 in (1.93 m)
- Listed weight: 210 lb (95 kg)

Career information
- High school: Lovejoy (GA)
- College: Tennessee (2015–2016); Colorado State (2017–2018)
- NFL draft: 2019: undrafted

Career history
- Miami Dolphins (2019–2021); Carolina Panthers (2022); DC Defenders (2024)*; Montreal Alouettes (2024)*
- * Offseason or practice squad member only

Awards and highlights
- First-team All-MWC (2018)

Career NFL statistics
- Receptions: 56
- Receiving yards: 787
- Receiving touchdowns: 7
- Return yards: 115
- Stats at Pro Football Reference

Preston Terrance Williams (born March 27, 1997) is an American football wide receiver. He played college football at Colorado State. He has played in the National Football League (NFL) for the Miami Dolphins and Carolina Panthers.

== Early life ==
Williams attended Lovejoy High School in Lovejoy, Georgia. At Lovejoy, Williams was the 2013 Georgia High School Association champion in the long jump. He committed to the University of Tennessee to play college football and track and field.

== College career ==
Williams played at Tennessee for two seasons from 2015 to 2016. He recorded 16 receptions for 247 yards and two touchdowns over that time. He transferred to Colorado State University in 2017. After sitting out the 2017 season due to NCAA transfer rules, Williams had 96 receptions for 1,345 yards and 14 touchdowns in 2018. He led the Mountain West Conference in receptions and receiving yards and finished second in receiving touchdowns. After the 2018 season, he entered the 2019 NFL draft, forgoing his senior season.

== Professional career ==
Pre-draft measurables
Height	Weight	Arm length	Hand span	40-yard dash	10-yard split	20-yard split	20-yard shuttle	Three-cone drill	Vertical jump	Broad jump
6 ft 4 1/4 in (1.94 m)	211 lb (96 kg)	33 in (0.84 m)	9 1/8 in (0.23 m)	4.61 s	1.65 s	2.77 s	4.35 s	7.11 s	31.5 in (0.80 m)	9 ft 8 in (2.95 m)
All values from Colorado State’s Pro Day

=== Miami Dolphins ===
Williams signed with the Miami Dolphins as an undrafted free agent on May 9, 2019. He made the final 53-man roster. He made his NFL debut in the Dolphins' 2019 season opener against the Baltimore Ravens. In the 59–10 loss, he had three receptions for 24 yards and his first professional touchdown. In Week 9, Williams had five catches for 72 yards and two touchdowns in the 26–18 win over the New York Jets. However in the game, Williams left the game with a knee injury, and was diagnosed with a torn ACL, ending his rookie season. He finished the season with 32 catches for 428 yards and three touchdowns as the team's leading receiver at the time of his injury.

In Week 5 against the San Francisco 49ers, Williams recorded four catches for 108 yards and a 32-yard touchdown reception during the 43–17 win. On November 11, 2020, Williams was placed on injured reserve with a foot injury. In the 2020 season, Williams appeared in eight games and recorded 18 receptions for 288 receiving yards and four receiving touchdowns.

In the 2021 season, Williams had six receptions for 71 yards in eight games and three starts.

On March 15, 2022, Williams signed a one-year contract extension with the Dolphins. He was waived on August 30, 2022.

=== Carolina Panthers ===
On September 5, 2022, Williams signed with the practice squad of the Carolina Panthers. He was signed to the active roster on January 7, 2023. He appeared in the team's Week 18 game against the New Orleans Saints, but only saw two offensive snaps and was not targeted. On May 18, Williams was released by Carolina.

=== DC Defenders ===
On December 14, 2023, Williams was signed by the DC Defenders of the United Football League (UFL). He was waived on March 5, 2024.

=== Montreal Alouettes ===
On May 3, 2024, Williams was signed by the Montreal Alouettes of the Canadian Football League (CFL). He was released by the Alouettes on June 4.
