= Brian Flores =

American football coach (born 1981)

Minnesota Vikings
- Title: Defensive coordinator

Personal information
- Born: February 24, 1981 (age 45); Brooklyn, New York, U.S.

Career information
- Position: Cornerback
- High school: Poly Prep (Brooklyn)
- College: Boston College (1999–2003)

Career history

Coaching
- New England Patriots (2008–2018); Special teams assistant (2008–2009); Assistant offense & special teams coach (2010); Defensive assistant (2011); Safeties coach (2012–2015); Linebackers coach (2016–2018); Miami Dolphins (2019–2021) Head coach; Pittsburgh Steelers (2022) Senior defensive assistant & linebackers coach; Minnesota Vikings (2023–present) Defensive coordinator

Operations
- New England Patriots (2004–2007); Scouting assistant (2004–2005); Pro scout (2006–2007)

Awards and highlights
- As an assistant coach: 4× Super Bowl champion (XXXIX, XLIX, LI, LIII); George Halas Award (2026)

Head coaching record
- Regular season: 24–25 (.490)
- Coaching profile at Pro Football Reference

Brian Francisco Flores (born February 24, 1981) is an American professional football coach who is the defensive coordinator for the Minnesota Vikings of the National Football League (NFL). He began his NFL career with the New England Patriots, where he served as an assistant coach from 2008 to 2018. Flores was New England's defensive playcaller during his final season with the team, which concluded with a victory in Super Bowl LIII. Following the victory, Flores served as the head coach of the Miami Dolphins from 2019 to 2021.

Although unable to reach the playoffs, Flores helped lead Miami to consecutive winning seasons between 2020 and 2021, the franchise's first since 2003. However, conflict with Dolphins management led to his firing after the 2021 season. Flores later filed a class-action lawsuit against the NFL, alleging racial discrimination in the league's treatment of minority coaches and executives. Amid the lawsuit, he returned to assistant coaching and became the defensive coordinator of the Vikings in 2023.

== Early life ==
Flores was born and raised in the Brownsville section of Brooklyn, New York City, to Honduran parents. After attending Poly Prep Country Day School in Brooklyn, he played football at Boston College as a cornerbackfrom 1999 through 2003. An injury prevented Flores from playing in the NFL. He grew up a fan of the New York Giants and New York Mets.

== Coaching career ==
=== New England Patriots ===
In 2004, at age 23, Flores joined the New England Patriots as a scouting assistant, the same year the franchise won its third Super Bowl title in Super Bowl XXXIX. He became a pro scout in 2006 before getting promoted to Bill Belichick's coaching staff in 2008, serving as a special teams coaching assistant until the end of the 2009 season. Flores's title was changed to assistant coach offense/special teams in 2010. He was named defensive assistant in 2011, where the Patriots appeared in Super Bowl XLVI, but lost 21–17 to the New York Giants in a rematch of Super Bowl XLII. In 2012, Flores was named safeties' coach. In his four-year tenure as safeties' coach, the Patriots defeated the Seattle Seahawks to win their fourth Super Bowl title in Super Bowl XLIX. Flores was named linebackers' coach ahead of the 2016 season. That same year, the Patriots defeated the Atlanta Falcons in Super Bowl LI after the Patriots were down 28–3 and rallied to win the game 34–28, in the first Super Bowl to be decided in overtime. The day after the Patriots lost Super Bowl LII to the Philadelphia Eagles, long-time assistant Matt Patricia left to become the new head coach of the Detroit Lions, and Flores would take over the Patriots' defensive playcalling duties, but was not given the title of defensive coordinator. In Flores's last game with the Patriots, Super Bowl LIII, they defeated the Los Angeles Rams, 13–3, in both a rematch of Super Bowl XXXVI and the lowest-scoring Super Bowl in NFL history.

=== Miami Dolphins ===
On February 4, 2019, Flores was hired as 12th head coach of the Miami Dolphins, becoming the fourth Latino in NFL history to become a head coach, after Ron Rivera, Tom Fears, and Tom Flores, the second former Belichick assistant to coach the team (the first being Nick Saban from 2005–2006). Flores was also interviewed by the Green Bay Packers, Denver Broncos, and Cleveland Browns for each of their vacant head coaching spots. The Dolphins also considered hiring Kansas City Chiefs offensive coordinator Eric Bieniemy and team assistants Darren Rizzi or Dowell Loggains prior to Flores's hiring.

==== 2019 season ====
On September 8, 2019, the Dolphins lost to the Baltimore Ravens 59–10 in Flores's head coaching debut. During Week 2, the Dolphins lost 43–0 to Flores's former team, the defending Super Bowl champion New England Patriots, leaving the Dolphins outscored by a total of 163 points as of the team's bye week in Week 5, which had included blowout losses to the Dallas Cowboys and Los Angeles Chargers. After a two-month winless start, Flores recorded his first win as a head coach in a 26–18 home victory over the division rival New York Jets on November 3, 2019. The Jets were led by Flores's predecessor and former Dolphins head coach Adam Gase, and that game was his first visit to Miami since the Dolphins fired him in December 2018. Flores followed this by earning his second consecutive win against the Indianapolis Colts the following week, which was Miami's first road win since Week 2 of the 2018 season. Flores's first season as head coach concluded with a 27–24 upset road victory over the Patriots, and was also the Dolphins' first road win over the Patriots since 2008. In his first season as a head coach, Flores led the Dolphins to a 5–11 record.

==== 2020 season ====
In his second season, Flores made the decision at the start of the 2020 season to start veteran quarterback Ryan Fitzpatrick over still injured rookie quarterback Tua Tagovailoa. The Dolphins went on to open the season with an 0–2 start with back-to-back losses against the division rivals New England Patriots and Buffalo Bills by the scores of 21–11 and 31–28 respectively, before winning their first game of the season against the Jacksonville Jaguars by a score of 31–13, also Miami's first win over Jacksonville since 2014. During a Week 5 game against the defending NFC Champion San Francisco 49ers, the Dolphins blew out the Niners by a score of 43–17, which was their first time since 2015 scoring more than 40 points in a game, their first blowout win since December 3, 2017, and was also their first road win over the 49ers since 2004. They would also begin a 5-game winning streak for the first time since 2016, after beginning the season 0–2 and then 1–3. On a Week 6 contest against the division rival New York Jets, a 24–0 win, the Dolphins were the favorites to win for the first time since Week 16 of the 2018 season, a 17–7 loss versus the Jaguars. The Dolphins were also favored to win for the first time under Flores's tenure as head coach. It was also the Dolphins' first shutout win since November 2, 2014. On October 20, Flores confirmed Tua would be the team's starting quarterback for Week 8, following their bye week, after allowing him to play the final seconds in the shutout win against the Jets. In Week 8, Tua's first NFL start, the Dolphins defense upset the Los Angeles Rams 28–17, as the Dolphins defeated them for the 5th time since 2001. On November 8, Flores guided the Dolphins to a 34–31 win over the Arizona Cardinals, which was their first road win over the Cardinals since 1996 and they also began the season 5–3 for the first time since 2014. On November 15, the Dolphins defeated the Los Angeles Chargers 29–21 to improve on their 5–11 record from last season and to begin the season 6–3 for the first time since 2001. On December 6, after defeating the Cincinnati Bengals 19–7, the Dolphins began the season 8–4 for the first time since 2003. On December 20, 2020, the Dolphins defeated Flores's former team, the New England Patriots, by a score of 22–12, which eliminated the Patriots from the playoffs for the first time since 2008 and the Dolphins clinched their first winning season since 2016 as well as their first under Flores's tenure. On January 3, 2021, after a 56–26 loss to the Buffalo Bills in Week 17, and after the Pittsburgh Steelers lost and the Indianapolis Colts won their season finales, the Dolphins were eliminated from playoff contention for the fourth consecutive season. The Dolphins ended the season 10–6.

==== 2021 season ====
Entering his third season, after veteran quarterback Ryan Fitzpatrick signed with the Washington Football Team on March 15, 2021, 2nd-year quarterback Tua Tagovailoa became the undisputed starting quarterback. During their season opener vs. the New England Patriots, the Dolphins won 17–16. After the opening win, Flores would join Don Shula as the only head coaches in franchise history to beat the Patriots multiple times in Foxboro. On September 19, on another divisional showdown versus the Buffalo Bills, starter Tua Tagovailoa suffered a rib injury that would cause him to miss the next 3 weeks. Miami would go on to lose that game 0–35. Flores made the decision to start Jacoby Brissett for the next 3 games, where he would go 0–3 as a starter which included a close Week 3 loss to the Las Vegas Raiders 28–31 in overtime, a 17–27 loss to Brissett's former team, the Indianapolis Colts, as well as a Week 5 blowout loss to the defending Super Bowl champion Tampa Bay Buccaneers 17–45, led by Tom Brady, whom Brissett backed up in 2016 as a member of the New England Patriots. On October 17, 2021, Flores and his team travelled to London, England, to take on the winless Jacksonville Jaguars, which marked Tua Tagovailoa's return from injury. Despite leading 13–3 in the first half, Flores's Dolphins lost 20–23 on a last-second field goal made by Jaguars kicker Matthew Wright, to snap the Jaguars' 20-game losing streak dating back to the 2020 season opener. After nearly 2 months of frustration and inconsistency, the Dolphins finally recorded their 2nd win of the season versus the Houston Texans in an ugly 17–9 win that featured nine turnovers and without Tagovailoa starting that game due to a fractured finger. On November 11, 2021, Flores guided the team to an upset victory over the Baltimore Ravens 22–10 on a Thursday Night Football game, the Dolphins' first win over the Ravens since 2015. On November 28, 2021, Flores's Dolphins defeated the Carolina Panthers 33–10 in Miami's first victory over Carolina since 2009. On December 5, 2021, the Dolphins defeated the New York Giants 20–9, which was the team's first win over the Giants since 2003, as well as their first-ever home win over the Giants. On December 19, 2021, the Dolphins defeated the New York Jets 31–24 after Miami was down 7–17 in the first half and was also their first time sweeping the Jets in back-to-back years since the 1996 and 1997 seasons. In Week 16, the Dolphins pushed their win streak to 7 with a 20–3 win over the New Orleans Saints; however, it came to an end the following week with a blowout loss of 34–3 to the Tennessee Titans. The Dolphins wrapped up their 2021 season on January 9, 2022, with a win over the playoff bound Patriots, defeating them 33–24. This marked the first time since 2000 that the Dolphins swept the season series with the Patriots. The team finished the 2021 season with a 9–8 record after starting the season 1–7 and then going 8–1. The Dolphins were the first team in NFL history to lose seven straight games and then win seven straight games in the same season. They also clinched back-to-back winning seasons for the first time since the 2002 and 2003 seasons.

On January 10, 2022, the Dolphins announced that they had fired Flores after three seasons. Flores finished his tenure with the Dolphins with a 24–25 (.490) record and no postseason berths during his tenure. It was reported that prior to Flores's firing, the Dolphins pursued Sean Payton to be the head coach of the Dolphins. The Dolphins and team owner Stephen M. Ross were fined $1.5 million and forfeited a 2023 first round draft pick along with a 2024 third round pick due to impermissible communication with both Payton and Tom Brady, who both share the same agent, Don Yee, between the 2019 and 2021 seasons. Ross would also receive a six-game suspension as a result and Dolphins vice chairman/limited partner Bruce Beal was fined $500,000 and received a year-long suspension for the 2022 season.

=== Pittsburgh Steelers ===
On February 19, 2022, Flores was announced as the Pittsburgh Steelers' senior defensive assistant and linebackers coach under head coach Mike Tomlin.

=== Minnesota Vikings ===
On February 6, 2023, Flores was hired by the Minnesota Vikings as their defensive coordinator under head coach Kevin O'Connell. On January 21, 2026, the Vikings announced their extension of Flores's contract.

== Lawsuit against NFL and teams ==
On February 1, 2022, Flores filed a class action lawsuit against the NFL, New York Giants, Denver Broncos, and Dolphins organizations, alleging racial discrimination. The suit claims that text messages he received from New England Patriots coach Bill Belichick, as well as media reports, prove that the New York Giants had decided to hire Brian Daboll, a colleague of Flores in New England from 2013 to 2016, as head coach before interviewing any minority candidates. The Giants, who had scheduled an interview with Flores for January 27, were alleged to have decided on Daboll by January 23. Flores also accused John Elway and Broncos management of conducting another sham head coach interview with him in 2019, arriving an hour late and appearing hungover. Elway responded by stating that five Broncos officials flew overnight from Colorado to Rhode Island to work around the only interview time that worked for Flores, that they had interviewed him for 3.5 hours, and that they took and still retain detailed notes proving their genuine interest in hiring him. The lawsuit additionally alleges that during Flores's tenure with the Dolphins, team owner Stephen Ross pressured him to deliberately lose games, offering him $100,000 for each game he lost in order for the Dolphins to get better draft picks for the following season, and to tamper with a quarterback before free agency. Flores alleges that he was fired by Ross in retaliation for his refusals to tank (in the process, achieving two consecutive winning seasons) and to tamper. The Palm Beach Post reported that the quarterback was Tom Brady. The lawsuit seeks damages and injunctive relief in the form of changes to hiring, retention, termination, and pay transparency practices for coaching and executive positions in the NFL.

On April 8, 2022, former Arizona Cardinals head coach Steve Wilks and long-time NFL assistant Ray Horton joined the lawsuit.

On March 1, 2023, United States District Court Judge Valerie E. Caproni granted the NFL's motion to compel arbitration in the lawsuit, except as to Flores's claims against the Giants, Texans, Broncos, and his related claims against the NFL.

== Head coaching record ==
Team	Year	Regular season					Postseason			
Team	Year	Won	Lost	Ties	Win %	Finish	Won	Lost	Win %	Result
MIA	2019	5	11	0	.313	4th in AFC East	—	—	—	—
MIA	2020	10	6	0	.625	2nd in AFC East	—	—	—	—
MIA	2021	9	8	0	.529	3rd in AFC East	—	—	—	—
Total		24	25	0	.490		0	0	.000	

== See also ==
- List of Afro-Latinos
