= Shaq Calhoun =

American football player (born 1996)

Profile
- Position: Guard

Personal information
- Born: February 20, 1996 (age 30); Birmingham, Alabama, U.S.
- Listed height: 6 ft 3 in (1.91 m)
- Listed weight: 310 lb (141 kg)

Career information
- High school: Restoration Academy (Fairfield, Alabama)
- College: Mississippi State
- NFL draft: 2019: undrafted

Career history
- Miami Dolphins (2019); Cincinnati Bengals (2020); Arizona Cardinals (2021)*; Denver Broncos (2021)*; Washington Football Team (2021)
- * Offseason or practice squad member only

Career NFL statistics
- Games played: 12
- Games started: 8
- C/CalhDe00.htm Stats at Pro Football Reference

Deion Lenard "Shaq" Calhoun (born February 20, 1996) is an American professional football guard. He played college football for the Mississippi State Bulldogs.

== College career ==
Calhoun was a member of the Mississippi State Bulldogs for five seasons, redshirting his true freshman season. He played mostly as a reserve at guard as a redshirt freshman before becoming a starter the following season, starting nine games before suffering a season-ending injury. He was named second-team All-Southeastern Conference as a redshirt senior. Following his final season Calhoun was invited to participate in the 2019 NFLPA Collegiate Bowl.

== Professional career ==
=== Miami Dolphins ===
Calhoun signed with the Miami Dolphins as an undrafted free agent on April 27, 2019. He made his NFL debut on September 15, 2019, against the New England Patriots. Calhoun made his first career start on October 20, 2019, against the Buffalo Bills in a 31–21 loss. In his rookie season, Calhoun played in 10 games with seven starts, committing one penalty and allowing 1.5 sacks in 470 offensive snaps played.

On September 5, 2020, Calhoun was waived by the Dolphins.

=== Cincinnati Bengals ===
On September 6, 2020, Calhoun was claimed off waivers by the Cincinnati Bengals. On September 28, 2020, Calhoun was waived by the Bengals and re-signed to the practice squad the next day. He was elevated to the active roster on October 31 for the team's week 8 game against the Tennessee Titans, and reverted to the practice squad after the game.

=== Arizona Cardinals ===
On January 6, 2021, Calhoun signed a reserve/future contract with the Arizona Cardinals. He was waived on August 30, 2021. He re-signed with their practice squad on September 29, 2021. He was released on October 4.

=== Denver Broncos ===
On October 27, 2021, Calhoun was signed to the Denver Broncos practice squad. He was released on November 16.

=== Washington Football Team ===
Calhoun signed with the Washington Football Team's practice squad on November 24, 2021. He signed a reserve/future contract after the 2021 regular season ended. Calhoun was released on August 16, 2022.
