= Gold Plan (sports) =

Proposal to change US sports team rules

The Gold Plan is a proposal to change how sports drafts work to discourage tanking and provide an incentive for teams already eliminated from the playoffs to try to win. First proposed in 2012 by then-PhD student Adam Gold, the plan works by having the draft order be determined by the number of points a team earns after being eliminated from qualifying for the playoffs. It is currently in use by the Professional Women's Hockey League.

== Background ==
Drafts are used in most North American major sports leagues to allocate new players to teams in a way that gives the worst teams the opportunity to pick first. Teams will tank to get a better draft pick and therefore the opportunity to get better players. While leagues like the NHL and NBA have a draft lottery to partially counteract this problem, it still encourages tanking by increasing the odds of getting a better pick by tanking. In 2012, Gold said that after NHL teams are eliminated, their winning percentage goes down by 16%.

== Proposal ==
Under the Gold Plan, after being eliminated from playoff contention, teams would begin to earn draft ranking points for their wins and overtime losses. Because the worst teams would be eliminated first, they have more games to earn draft ranking points from.

Gold said that some flexibility exists in the ranking system depending on what the league wants; for example it could ensure that the team with the worst record is guaranteed at least the second pick.

== History ==
Gold, a PhD student at the University of Missouri, first presented the concept at the 2012 MIT Sloan Sports Analytics Conference. He said he first conceived the idea in 2008, which was when NHL teams were tanking for Steven Stamkos.

Arizona Coyotes forward Shane Doan proposed a similar system in 2016 after his son rooted for his team to lose so it could draft Connor McDavid. The Athletic's Sean McIndoe also boosted the proposal by tracking hypothetical Gold Plan rankings for the NHL.

In February 2024, the Professional Women's Hockey League (PWHL) announced it would use the Gold Plan for its 2024 draft.
