= Harold Landry =

American football player (born 1996)

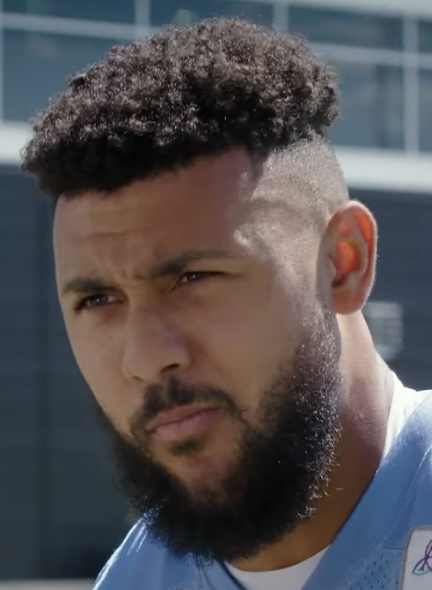
- Landry in 2021

No. 2 – New England Patriots
- Position: Outside linebacker
- Roster status: Physically unable to perform

Personal information
- Born: June 5, 1996 (age 30); Spring Lake, North Carolina, U.S.
- Listed height: 6 ft 2 in (1.88 m)
- Listed weight: 252 lb (114 kg)

Career information
- High school: Pine Forest (Fayetteville, North Carolina)
- College: Boston College (2014–2017)
- NFL draft: 2018: 2nd round, 41st overall pick

Career history
- Tennessee Titans (2018–2024); New England Patriots (2025–present)

Awards and highlights
- Pro Bowl (2021); Second-team All-ACC (2016); Third-team All-ACC (2017); NCAA records: Forced fumbles in a season: 7 (Note: Tied with Jacob Rodriguez of the 2025 Texas Tech Red Raiders, Red Murdock of the 2024 Buffalo Bulls, and Jake Hansen of the 2019 Illinois Fighting Illini.) (2016)

Career NFL statistics as of 2025
- Total tackles: 446
- Sacks: 59
- Safeties: 1
- Forced fumbles: 4
- Fumble recoveries: 2
- Pass deflections: 12
- Interceptions: 2
- Stats at Pro Football Reference

Harold Antonio Landry III (born June 5, 1996) is an American professional football outside linebacker for the New England Patriots of the National Football League (NFL). He played college football for the Boston College Eagles and was selected by the Tennessee Titans in the second round of the 2018 NFL draft.

== Early life ==
Landry was born in Spring Lake, North Carolina to Doreen and Harold Landry on June 5, 1996. Landry attended Pine Forest High School in Fayetteville, North Carolina. As a senior, he had 96 tackles and 17 sacks. He committed to Boston College to play college football.

== College career ==
As a true freshman at Boston College in 2014, Landry appeared in all 13 games, recording 11 tackles. As a sophomore he appeared in 12 games with 11 starts and had 60 tackles and 4.5 sacks. As a junior in 2016, Landry led the nation and set a Boston College record with 16.5 sacks. He returned to Boston College for his senior year, rather than enter the 2017 NFL draft. Landry was invited to the Senior Bowl, but opted not to attend due to a lingering ankle injury.

== Professional career ==
=== Pre-draft ===
Landry participated in the NFL Combine on March 4, 2018. Prior to the NFL draft, Landry was a popular mock draft pick for the Green Bay Packers, Detroit Lions and Tennessee Titans.

Pre-draft measurables
Height	Weight	Arm length	Hand span	Wingspan	40-yard dash	10-yard split	20-yard split	20-yard shuttle	Three-cone drill	Vertical jump	Broad jump	Bench press
6 ft 2 3/8 in (1.89 m)	252 lb (114 kg)	32 7/8 in (0.84 m)	9 3/8 in (0.24 m)	6 ft 6 7/8 in (2.00 m)	4.64 s	1.59 s	2.69 s	4.19 s	6.88 s	36 in (0.91 m)	9 ft 11 in (3.02 m)	24 reps
All values from NFL Combine

=== Tennessee Titans ===
==== 2018 season ====
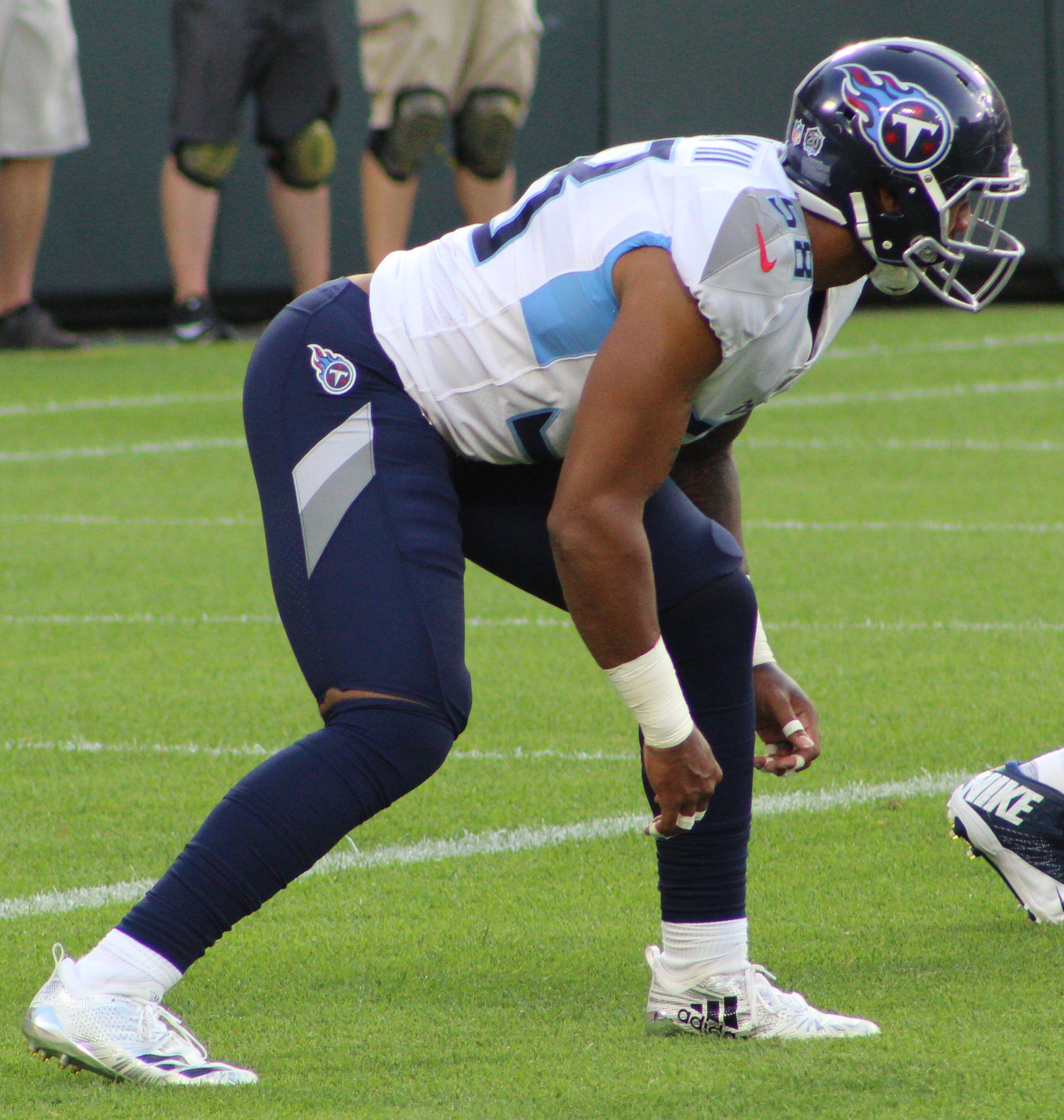
Landry in 2018

Landry was selected by the Tennessee Titans in the second round (41st overall) of the 2018 NFL draft.

Landry signed his rookie contract on June 14, 2018. He made his NFL debut in Week 2 of the 2018 season against the Houston Texans. During Week 4 against the Philadelphia Eagles, Landry recorded his first NFL sack on Carson Wentz. He finished the 26–23 overtime victory with four tackles, a sack, and a forced fumble. During Week 9 against the Dallas Cowboys, Landry sacked Dak Prescott once in the 28–14 road victory. Landry recorded a sack in each of the final two games of the season.

Landry finished his rookie season with 4.5 sacks, 44 tackles, two pass deflections, and a forced fumble.

==== 2019 season ====
During Week 4 against the Atlanta Falcons, Landry sacked Matt Ryan twice in the 24–10 road victory. During Week 8 against the Tampa Bay Buccaneers, he recorded a strip sack on Jameis Winston and recovered the ball in a 27–23 victory. In the next game against the Carolina Panthers, Landry recorded his first NFL interception off quarterback Kyle Allen in the 30–20 road loss.

Landry finished his second professional season with a then-career-high nine sacks along with 68 tackles, a forced fumble, two fumble recoveries, an interception, and a pass deflection. In the Divisional Round against the Baltimore Ravens, Landry sacked quarterback Lamar Jackson once in the 28–12 road victory.

==== 2020 season ====
During Week 2 against the Jacksonville Jaguars, Landry intercepted his first pass of the season off a pass thrown by Gardner Minshew late in the fourth quarter to secure a 33–30 victory for the Titans. Three weeks later against the Buffalo Bills, Landry recorded his first sack of the season by spinning down Josh Allen in the 42–16 victory. During a Week 9 victory of 24–17 over the Chicago Bears, Landry recorded four tackles and a sack. Two weeks later against the Baltimore Ravens, he recorded seven tackles and a sack in the 30–24 overtime road victory. In the next game against the Indianapolis Colts, Landry recorded another sack in the 45–26 road victory. In the regular-season finale against the Texans, he recorded four tackles and a sack in the 41–38 road victory.

Landry finished the 2020 season with 5.5 sacks, a then-career-high 69 tackles, an interception, and a career-high five pass deflections. In the Wild Card round of the playoffs against the Ravens, Landry led the team with 10 tackles (8 solo) and sacked quarterback Lamar Jackson twice during the 20–13 loss.

==== 2021 season ====
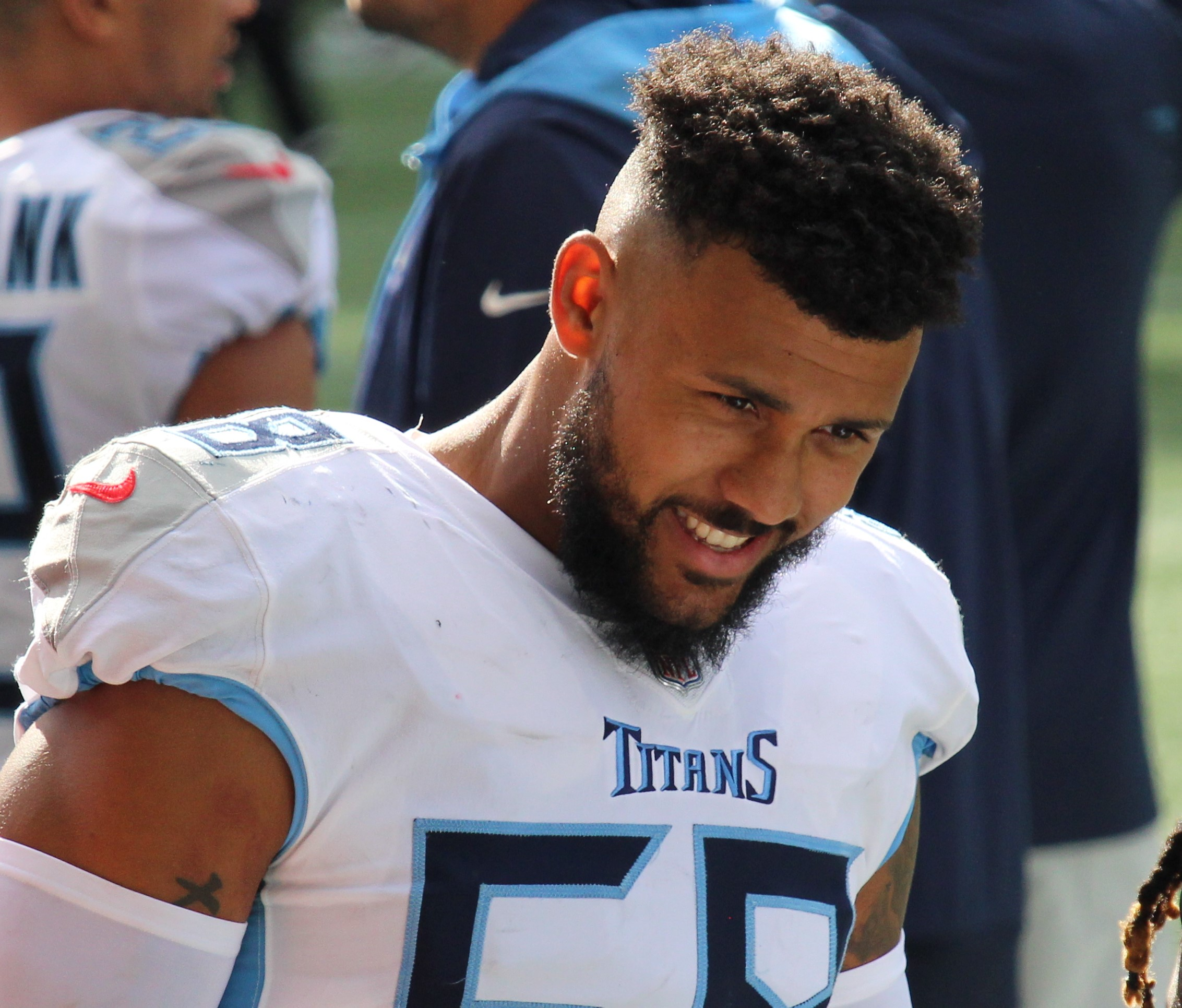
Landry in 2021

During the season-opener against the Arizona Cardinals, Landry recorded three tackles and sacked Kyler Murray once in the 38–13 loss. Three weeks later, Landry recorded seven tackles and a sack in a 27–24 overtime road loss to the New York Jets. In the next game against the Jaguars, he recorded seven tackles and sacked rookie quarterback Trevor Lawrence twice in the 37–19 road victory. The following week against the Bills, Landry recorded eight tackles and sacked Josh Allen twice in the narrow 34–31 victory. During a Week 8 overtime road victory of 34–31 over the Colts, Landry recorded five tackles, a sack, and a forced fumble. Two weeks later, he recorded five tackles and a sack in a 23–21 victory over the New Orleans Saints. During a Week 14 shutout victory of 20–0 over the Jaguars, Landry recorded three tackles and a sack. Three weeks later against the Miami Dolphins, he recorded three tackles and a sack in the 34–3 victory.

Landry finished the 2021 season with a career-high 12 sacks, a career-high 74 tackles, and a forced fumble. The Titans finished atop the AFC with a 12–5 record and earned a first-round bye in the playoffs. In the Divisional Round round of the playoffs against the Cincinnati Bengals, Landry had six tackles and 1.5 sacks in the 19–16 loss. On January 26, 2022, Landry was selected to appear in the 2022 Pro Bowl as an injury replacement. It marked his first career Pro Bowl.

==== 2022 season ====
On March 8, 2022, Landry signed a five-year, $87.5 million extension with $52.5 million guaranteed. On August 31, Landry tore his ACL in practice, prematurely ending his season. He was placed on injured reserve two days later.

==== 2023 season ====
Landry returned as a starter in 2023 alongside Denico Autry and Arden Key. In Week 14, Landry recorded three sacks and five tackles in a 28–27 win over the Miami Dolphins, earning AFC Defensive Player of the Week. He finished the season with 69 tackles and 10.5 sacks.

==== 2024 season ====
Landry continued as a starting linebacker for the 2024 season. On a Week 12 road game against the Houston Texans, Landry made a sack against C. J. Stroud for his first career safety during the final two minutes of the game, sealing off the Titans' victory in a 32–27 upset. He started all 17 games, finishing with 71 tackles, nine sacks, 18 pressures, and four pass deflections. On February 26, 2025, the Titans granted Landry permission to seek a trade, later releasing him on March 7 after failing to find a trade partner.

=== New England Patriots ===
==== 2025 season ====
On March 12, 2025, Landry signed a three-year, $43.5 million contract with the New England Patriots. In his Patriots debut against the Las Vegas Raiders, Landry tallied 2.5 sacks of Raiders quarterback Geno Smith, though the Patriots would lose 20–13. In the 2025 season, he had 49 total tackles (27 solo), 8.5 sacks, and one forced fumble in 15 games.

== Career statistics ==
=== NFL ===
Legend
	Led the league
**Bold**	Career high

==== Regular season ====
Year	Team	Games		Tackles						Fumbles				Interceptions					
Year	Team	GP	GS	Cmb	Solo	Ast	Sck	TFL	Sfty	FF	FR	Yds	TD	Int	Yds	Avg	Lng	TD	PD
2018	TEN	15	3	44	24	20	4.5	5	0	**1**	0	0	0	0	0	0.0	0	0	2
2019	TEN	16	16	68	43	25	9.0	12	0	**1**	**2**	0	0	**1**	0	0.0	0	0	1
2020	TEN	16	16	69	46	23	5.5	10	0	0	0	0	0	**1**	0	0.0	0	0	**5**
2021	TEN	17	17	**75**	**51**	24	**12.0**	14	0	**1**	0	0	0	0	0	0.0	0	0	0
2022	TEN	Did not play due to injury																	
2023	TEN	17	10	70	45	25	10.5	14	0	0	0	0	0	0	0	0.0	0	0	0
2024	TEN	17	17	71	42	**29**	9.0	**15**	**1**	0	0	0	0	0	0	0.0	0	0	4
2025	NE	15	14	49	27	22	8.5	10	0	**1**	0	0	0	0	0	0.0	0	0	0
Career		113	93	446	278	168	59.0	80	1	4	2	0	0	2	0	0.0	0	0	12

==== Postseason ====
Year	Team	Games		Tackles					Fumbles				Interceptions					
Year	Team	GP	GS	Cmb	Solo	Ast	Sck	TFL	FF	FR	Yds	TD	Int	Yds	Avg	Lng	TD	PD
2019	TEN	3	3	7	5	2	1.0	**1**	0	0	0	0	0	0	0.0	0	0	**1**
2020	TEN	1	1	**10**	**8**	2	**2.0**	**1**	0	0	0	0	0	0	0.0	0	0	0
2021	TEN	1	1	6	3	**3**	1.5	**1**	0	0	0	0	0	0	0.0	0	0	0
2025	NE	3	1	5	4	1	0.0	0	0	0	0	0	0	0	0.0	0	0	0
Career		8	6	28	20	8	4.5	3	0	0	0	0	0	0	0.0	0	0	1

=== College ===
Season	Class	Pos	GP	Tackles					Interceptions					Fumbles				
Season	Class	Pos	GP	Solo	Ast	Cmb	TfL	Sck	Int	Yds	Avg	TD	PD	FR	Yds	TD	FF	
2014	Boston College	FR	DL	6	6	4	10	0	0.0	0	0	0	0	0	0	0	0	0
2015	Boston College	SO	DL	12	38	22	60	4.5	0	0	0	0.0	0	0	1	0	0	3
2016	Boston College	JR	DE	12	34	16	22	16.5	1	1	20	20.0	0	4	0	0	0	7
2017	Boston College	SR	DE	8	22	16	8.5	5.0	0	0	0	0.0	0	2	0	0	0	0
Career				38	100	58	158	26.0	25.0	1	20	20.0	0	6	1	0	0	10

== Personal life ==
Landry and his wife, Danielle, have two sons: Greyson and Ollie. He and Greyson share the same June 5 birthday.
