= Cedrick Wilson Jr. =

American football player (born 1995)

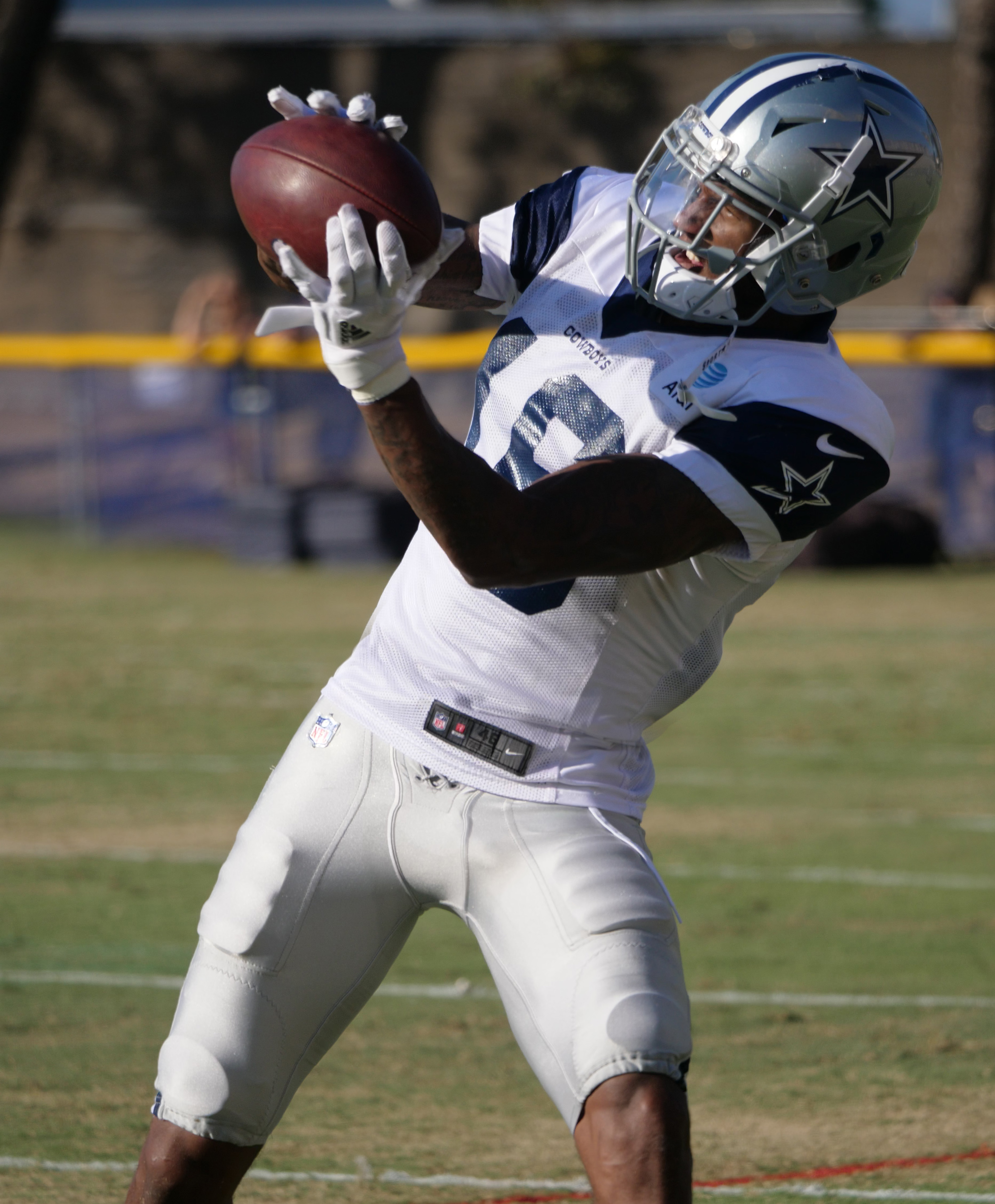
- Wilson with the Dallas Cowboys in 2019

Profile
- Position: Wide receiver

Personal information
- Born: November 20, 1995 (age 30); Memphis, Tennessee, U.S.
- Listed height: 6 ft 2 in (1.88 m)
- Listed weight: 197 lb (89 kg)

Career information
- High school: White Station (Memphis)
- College: Coffeyville CC (2014–2015); Boise State (2016–2017)
- NFL draft: 2018: 6th round, 208th overall pick

Career history
- Dallas Cowboys (2018–2021); Miami Dolphins (2022–2023); New Orleans Saints (2024–2025); Miami Dolphins (2025); Detroit Lions (2026)*
- * Offseason or practice squad member only

Awards and highlights
- First-team All-MW (2017)

Career NFL statistics as of 2025
- Receptions: 126
- Receiving yards: 1,524
- Receiving touchdowns: 12
- Stats at Pro Football Reference

Cedrick Wilson Jr. (born November 20, 1995) is an American professional football wide receiver. He played college football for the Boise State Broncos, and was selected by the Dallas Cowboys in the 2018 NFL draft.

== Early life ==
Wilson attended White Station High School, in Memphis, Tennessee. As a junior, he was named the starter at quarterback.

As a senior, he registered 142 of 239 completions for 1,973 yards, 22 passing touchdowns and 7 rushing touchdowns. He led his team to the Class 6A semifinals, while earning 6A All-State, second-team 16-AAA All-District honors and offensive player of the year by the Touchdown Club of Memphis.

== College career ==
Wilson enrolled at Coffeyville Community College. As a freshman, he registered 629 yards and 10 touchdowns, receiving All-conference honors.

As a sophomore, he posted 66 receptions, 1,045 receiving yards (second-highest in school history) and 17 touchdowns (fourth in the nation), while earning second-team Junior College All-American honors.

In 2016, he transferred to Boise State University. As a junior, he appeared in 12 games, of which he started five. He recorded 56 receptions (second on the team) for 1,129 yards (second on the team) and 11 touchdowns (led the team). He returned 13 punts for 132 yards (13.2-yard average), with a long of 73 yards against UNLV and 13 kickoffs for 277 yards (21.3-yard average). He threw a 61-yard touchdown pass against Utah State. He played most of the season with torn ligaments in his left ankle, which he injured in the fifth game of the season against New Mexico. Wilson was named Honorable Mention All-Mountain West for his 2016 season.

As a senior, he started 13 games, posting 83 receptions (led the team) for 1,511 yards (led the team) and seven touchdowns (second on the team). He returned 18 kickoffs for 465 yards (25.8-yard average). Against Virginia, he set single-game career-highs in receptions (13) and receiving yards (209), while also scoring a touchdown. During the season he played through an ankle injury, including in the 38–28 win over Oregon at the Las Vegas Bowl, where he made 10 receptions for 221 yards and one touchdown whilst earning MVP honors. Wilson was named first-team All-Mountain West for his successful 2017 season.

== Professional career ==
Pre-draft measurables
Height	Weight	Arm length	Hand span	Wingspan	40-yard dash	10-yard split	20-yard split	20-yard shuttle	Three-cone drill	Vertical jump	Broad jump	Bench press
6 ft 2 1/4 in (1.89 m)	197 lb (89 kg)	31 1/2 in (0.80 m)	9 3/4 in (0.25 m)	6 ft 5 3/8 in (1.97 m)	4.55 s	1.50 s	2.65 s	4.23 s	6.89 s	37.0 in (0.94 m)	10 ft 1 in (3.07 m)	9 reps
All values from NFL Combine

=== Dallas Cowboys ===
Wilson was selected by the Dallas Cowboys in the sixth round (208th overall) of the 2018 NFL draft. On July 31, Wilson was placed on injured reserve after being diagnosed with a torn labrum in his shoulder.

On August 31, 2019, Wilson was released after being passed on the depth chart by Devin Smith. He was signed to the practice squad on September 2. Wilson was promoted to the active roster on September 13, to serve as the No. 5 receiver after fellow receiver Tavon Austin was ruled out for Week 2 after suffering a concussion in the season opener. He was placed on injured reserve with a knee injury on December 10. Wilson appeared in six games and was declared inactive in six contests, posting five receptions for 46 yards. He played a role as both the kickoff and punt returner.

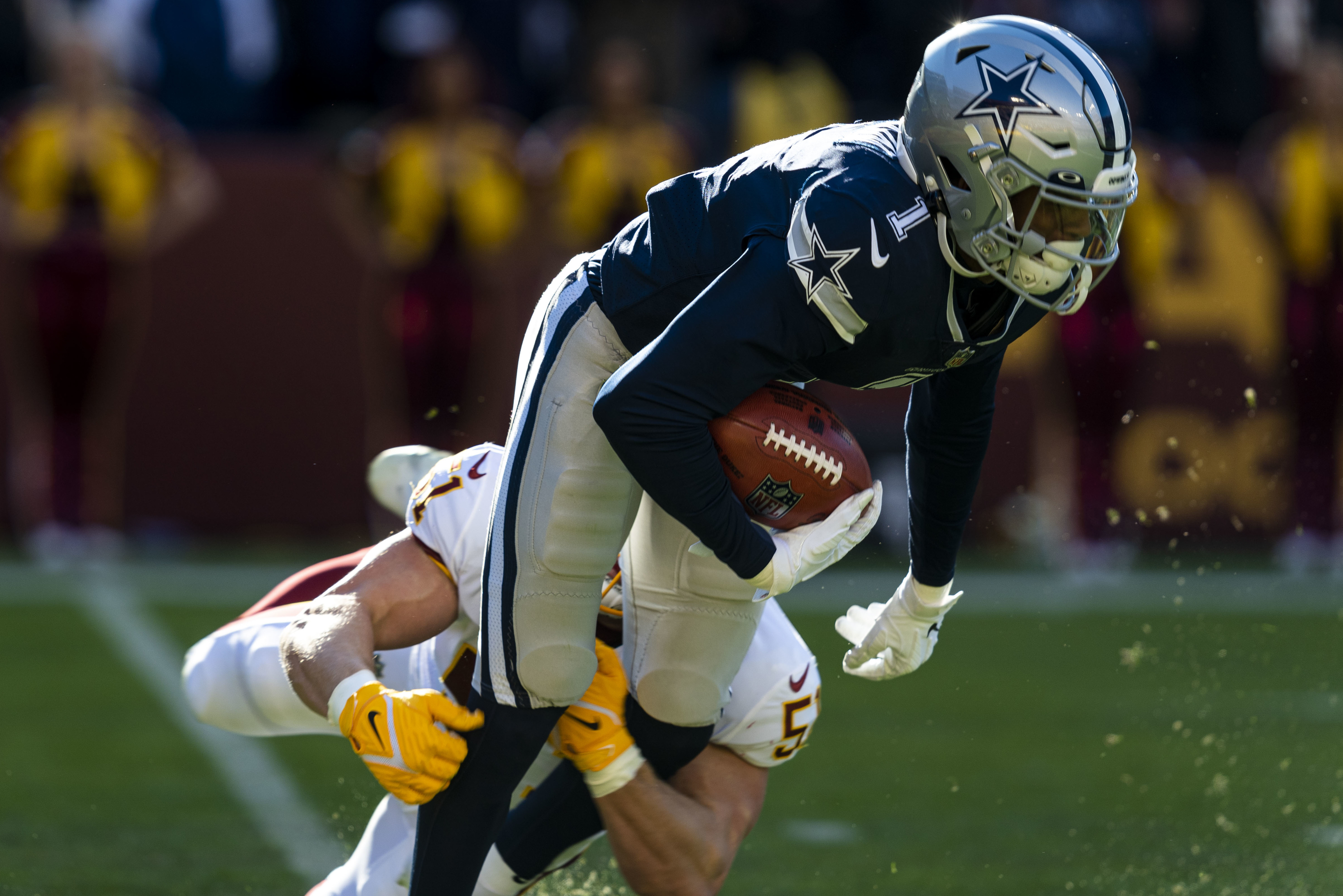
Wilson playing for the Cowboys in 2021.

In 2020, Cedrick appeared in 16 games, while posting 17 receptions for 189 yards, two receiving touchdowns, two passes for 23 yards and one touchdown pass. In the Week 3, 31–38 loss against the Seattle Seahawks, Wilson finished with five receptions for 107 receiving yards and two touchdowns, as the team was forced to play more four wide receiver sets. It was the first game in his professional career with at least 100 receiving yards in a single game. In Week 5 against the New York Giants, Wilson threw an 11-yard touchdown pass to quarterback Dak Prescott on a trick play during the 37–34 win.

The Cowboys placed an original round restricted free agent tender on Wilson on March 17, 2021. He signed the one-year contract on April 22. 2021 saw Wilson more involved with the offense as a primary deep-ball threat due to teammate Michael Gallup missing half of the season because of injuries. In Week 8 against the Minnesota Vikings, Wilson caught a 73-yard touchdown reception as the Cowboys would win the game 20–16. In Week 12, he had 104 yards on 7 receptions against the Las Vegas Raiders. Week 18 saw the best game in his career against the Philadelphia Eagles, as he had 5 receptions for 119 yards and two touchdowns. Wilson finished the season with career highs in every statistical category; 602 yards and 6 touchdowns on 45 receptions.

=== Miami Dolphins (first stint) ===
On March 17, 2022, Wilson signed a three-year, $22.8 million contract with the Miami Dolphins and was expected to compliment second-year wide receiver Jaylen Waddle. He ended up having a diminished role behind the recently acquired Tyreek Hill and Waddle, plus the emergence of Trent Sherfield as the main backup at wide receiver. He appeared in 15 games, tallying 12 receptions for 136 yards, 13 punt returns for 97 yards (7.5-yard avg.) and no touchdowns.

In August 2023, his contract was restructured by the Dolphins after his down season, with a provision to create a void year and becoming a free agent in 2024. His production had a slight improvement because of injuries to the other team's wide receivers, registering 22 receptions (fourth on the team), 296 yards and 3 touchdowns in 15 contests. He also lost his punt return specialist role when the team added Braxton Berrios.

=== New Orleans Saints ===
On March 15, 2024, Wilson signed a two-year contract with the New Orleans Saints. In Week 7 against the Denver Broncos, Wilson was on the receiving end of Jake Haener's first career touchdown pass. In Week 15 against the Washington Commanders, Wilson was part of a trick play that saw him throw a 21-yard touchdown pass to Alvin Kamara. He finished the year having played in 15 games (4 starts) for the Saints, in which he recorded 20 receptions for 211 yards and the lone touchdown from Haener.

On August 27, 2025, Wilson was released by the Saints and re-signed to the practice squad. On September 18, he was waived by New Orleans. Wilson re-signed with the Saints' practice squad on September 22.

=== Miami Dolphins (second stint) ===
On October 1, 2025, Wilson was signed by the Miami Dolphins off of the Saints' practice squad. He was acquired to improve the wide receiver depth, after Tyreek Hill suffered a season-ending left knee injury. Wilson appeared in 10 games (five starts) for the team, recording 5 receptions for 44 yards, while failing to record more than one catch in any contest.

=== Detroit Lions ===
On May 20, 2026, Wilson signed with the Detroit Lions. On August 24, Wilson was placed on injured reserve due to a knee injury suffered in the team's preseason matchup against the Washington Commanders; he was released two days later.

== Career statistics ==
=== NFL ===
Legend
**Bold**	Career high

==== Regular season ====
Year	Team	Games		Receiving					Rushing					Fumbles	
Year	Team	GP	GS	Rec	Yds	Avg	Lng	TD	Att	Yds	Avg	Lng	TD	Fum	Lost
2019	DAL	6	0	5	46	9.2	14	0	0	0	0.0	0	0	0	0
2020	DAL	**16**	0	17	189	11.1	42	2	**3**	-12	-4.0	-1	0	0	0
2021	DAL	**16**	**4**	**45**	**602**	13.4	**73**	**6**	2	**11**	5.5	6	0	**3**	0
2022	MIA	15	0	12	136	11.3	21	0	1	8	**8.0**	**8**	0	0	0
2023	MIA	15	3	22	296	**13.5**	31	3	0	0	0.0	0	0	0	0
2024	NO	15	**4**	20	211	10.6	25	1	0	0	0.0	0	0	1	**1**
2025	MIA	10	5	5	44	8.8	16	0	0	0	0	0	0	0	0
Career		93	16	126	1,524	12.1	73	12	6	7	1.2	8	0	4	1

==== Postseason ====
Year	Team	Games		Receiving					Rushing					Fumbles	
Year	Team	GP	GS	Rec	Yds	Avg	Lng	TD	Att	Yds	Avg	Lng	TD	Fum	Lost
2021	DAL	1	0	**5**	**62**	12.4	**24**	0	0	0	0.0	0	0	**1**	0
2022	MIA	1	0	1	14	**14.0**	14	0	0	0	0.0	0	0	0	0
2023	MIA	1	0	3	37	12.3	19	0	0	0	0.0	0	0	0	0
Career		3	0	9	113	12.6	24	0	0	0	0.0	0	0	1	0

=== College ===
Season	Team	GP	Receiving			
Season	Team	GP	Rec	Yds	Avg	TD
2016	Boise State	12	56	1,128	20.2	11
2017	Boise State	14	83	1,511	18.2	7
Total		26	139	2,640	19.0	18

== Personal life ==
His father Cedrick Wilson Sr., was a wide receiver in the NFL for seven years with the San Francisco 49ers and the Pittsburgh Steelers.
