= Julian Hill (American football) =

American football player (born 2000)

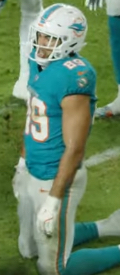
- Hill with the Miami Dolphins in 2024

No. 80 – New England Patriots
- Position: Tight end
- Roster status: Injured reserve

Personal information
- Born: July 9, 2000 (age 26); Fayetteville, North Carolina, U.S.
- Listed height: 6 ft 4 in (1.93 m)
- Listed weight: 251 lb (114 kg)

Career information
- High school: Pine Forest (Fayetteville)
- College: Campbell (2018–2022)
- NFL draft: 2023: undrafted

Career history
- Miami Dolphins (2023–2025); New England Patriots (2026–present)

Career NFL statistics as of 2025
- Receptions: 33
- Receiving yards: 288
- Stats at Pro Football Reference

Julian Marquez Hill (born July 9, 2000) is an American professional football tight end for the New England Patriots of the National Football League (NFL). He played college football for the Campbell Fighting Camels and was signed by the Miami Dolphins as an undrafted free agent in 2023.

== Early life ==
Hill was born on July 9, 2000. Between the ages of 5 and 10, Hill had a bout with homelessness while under the care of his biological mother. At age 10, he was adopted by Paul and Shannon Schaffer. They were the first ones to get him involved in sports. He attended Pine Forest High School and was a multi-sport athlete, playing football, baseball and basketball. He played quarterback in football and was thrust into a starting role three games into his freshman year, completing 52% of his passes while throwing for 927 yards and six touchdowns. His sophomore season ended prematurely when he suffered a torn ACL.

Hill rebounded as a junior with 17 passing touchdowns and 1,642 passing yards; however, he tore his ACL again in the season finale and that caused him to miss his entire senior year of football, making many recruiters lose interest in him. Hill recovered in time for the basketball season and while playing became noticed by a coach for the Campbell Fighting Camels, a Division I FCS football program. He made the team as a preferred walk-on and transitioned to being a tight end.

== College career ==
As a true freshman at Campbell, Hill played all 11 games. He played 11 games again in the 2019 season, his second, and had six receptions for 85 yards. In the COVID-19-shortened 2020 season, he posted six catches for 102 yards and was selected second-team All-Big South Conference. The following season, Hill led the Big South with 34 receptions for 367 yards and two touchdowns, being named first-team all-conference. In his final season, he earned a third all-conference selection and had 38 catches for 659 yards and five touchdowns. He finished his collegiate career having totaled 85 catches for 1,218 yards and seven touchdowns in 48 games, the last 26 of which he started.

== Professional career ==
Pre-draft measurables
Height	Weight	Arm length	Hand span	Wingspan	40-yard dash	10-yard split	20-yard split	20-yard shuttle	Three-cone drill	Vertical jump	Broad jump	Bench press
6 ft 3 5/8 in (1.92 m)	247 lb (112 kg)	33 in (0.84 m)	10 in (0.25 m)	6 ft 7 5/8 in (2.02 m)	4.68 s	1.65 s	2.73 s	4.31 s	7.36 s	34.5 in (0.88 m)	10 ft 2 in (3.10 m)	21 reps
All values from Pro Day

=== Miami Dolphins ===
After going unselected in the 2023 NFL draft, Hill was signed by the Miami Dolphins as an undrafted free agent. He made their final roster as a rookie, being the first Campbell player to make an NFL roster. In his first season with the Dolphins, Hill made a total of 15 appearances, catching 6 passes for 48 yards.

During Miami's Week 3 game against the Seattle Seahawks on September 22, 2024, Hill experienced a wardrobe malfunction. After catching a pass, Hill was tackled by Seahawks safety Rayshawn Jenkins, who inadvertently pulled down Hill’s pants, exposing his backside to the crowd and cameras. This incident was widely discussed among NFL fans and led to numerous jokes and comments on social media.

=== New England Patriots ===
On March 12, 2026, the New England Patriots signed Hill to a three-year contract. He was placed on injured reserve on June 1, due to a season-ending knee injury he suffered during practice.

== NFL career statistics ==
Legend
**Bold**	Career high

=== Regular season ===
Year	Team	Games		Receiving						Tackles			Fumbles		
Year	Team	GP	GS	Tgt	Rec	Yds	Avg	Lng	TD	Cmb	Solo	Ast	FR	Fum	Lost
2023	MIA	15	4	9	6	48	8.0	18	0	0	0	0	0	**1**	**1**
2024	MIA	16	11	19	12	100	8.3	17	0	**4**	**1**	**3**	0	**1**	0
2025	MIA	14	11	**20**	**15**	**140**	**9.3**	**20**	0	1	**1**	0	**1**	0	0
Career		45	26	48	33	288	8.7	20	0	5	2	3	1	2	1

=== Postseason ===
Year	Team	Games		Receiving						Tackles			Fumbles		
Year	Team	GP	GS	Tgt	Rec	Yds	Avg	Lng	TD	Cmb	Solo	Ast	FR	Fum	Lost
2023	MIA	1	0	0	0	0	0.0	0	0	0	0	0	0	0	0
Career		1	0	0	0	0	0.0	0	0	0	0	0	0	0	0

== Personal life ==
Hill is the son of Paul and Shannon Schaeffer.
