= Lamont Gaillard =

American football player (born 1996)

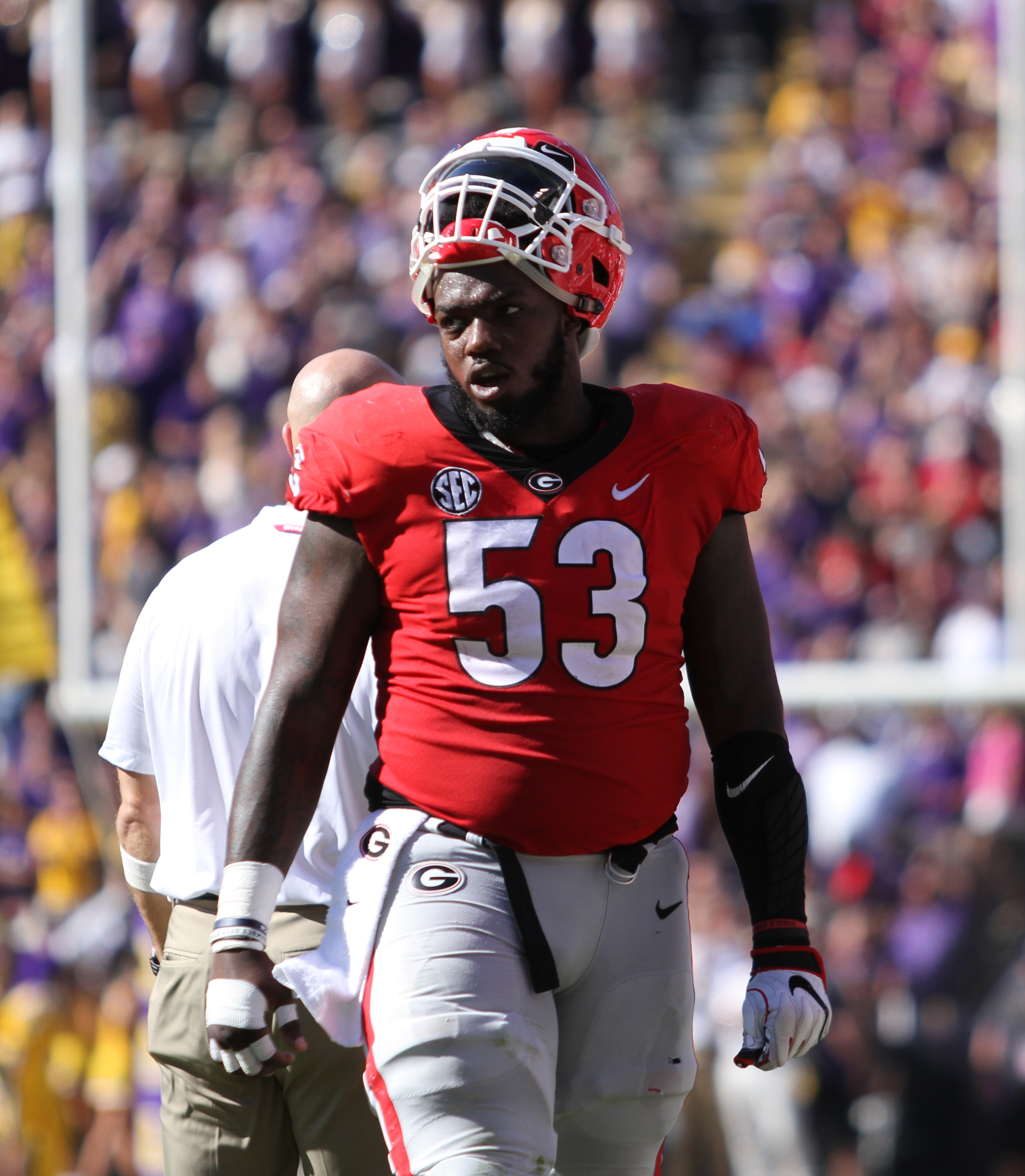
- Gaillard with the Georgia Bulldogs in 2018

Profile
- Position: Center

Personal information
- Born: February 8, 1996 (age 30); Fayetteville, North Carolina, U.S.
- Listed height: 6 ft 3 in (1.91 m)
- Listed weight: 305 lb (138 kg)

Career information
- High school: Pine Forest (Fayetteville)
- College: Georgia (2014–2018)
- NFL draft: 2019: 6th round, 179th overall pick

Career history
- Arizona Cardinals (2019–2020); Cincinnati Bengals (2021–2022)*; Miami Dolphins (2022)*; DC Defenders (2024–2025); San Antonio Brahmas (2025)
- * Offseason or practice squad member only

Career NFL statistics
- Games played: 13
- Games started: 2
- Stats at Pro Football Reference

Lamont Rockarius Gaillard (born February 8, 1996) is an American professional football center. He played college football at Georgia, and was selected by the Arizona Cardinals in the sixth round of the 2019 NFL draft.

== Early life ==
Gaillard was born and grew up in Fayetteville, North Carolina, and attended Pine Forest High School. He played defensive tackle for the Trojans and was named first-team All-Mid-South 4-A Conference as a junior after making 100 tackles with four sacks. He was rated a four-star prospect by most recruiting services and committed to play college football at Georgia going into his senior year. As a senior Gaillard participated in the 2014 Under Armour All-America Game.

== College career ==
Gaillard spent five total seasons as a member of the Georgia Bulldogs football team, redshirting his true freshman season. He was moved from defensive line to offensive line during his redshirt year and appeared in two games at right guard in his first season of play. He started all 13 of the Bulldogs games as a redshirt sophomore before moving to center before the 2017 season. He started every game for Georgia at center in each of his final two seasons. After the end of his redshirt senior season, Gaillard was invited to play in the 2019 East–West Shrine Game.

== Professional career ==
Pre-draft measurables
Height	Weight	Arm length	Hand span	40-yard dash	10-yard split	20-yard split	20-yard shuttle	Three-cone drill	Vertical jump	Broad jump	Bench press
6 ft 2 5/8 in (1.90 m)	305 lb (138 kg)	33 1/2 in (0.85 m)	10 3/8 in (0.26 m)	5.15 s	1.77 s	2.94 s	4.78 s	7.81 s	26.5 in (0.67 m)	8 ft 1 in (2.46 m)	18 reps
All values from NFL Combine/Pro Day

=== Arizona Cardinals ===
Gaillard was selected by the Arizona Cardinals in the sixth round (179th overall) in the 2019 NFL draft. The Cardinals acquired this selection from the Tampa Bay Buccaneers in exchange for the rights to head coach Bruce Arians. He signed a rookie contract with the team on May 9, 2019. Gaillard spent his rookie season on the 53-man roster but did not appear in any regular season games.

Gaillard made his NFL debut on September 13, 2020 in the season opener against the San Francisco 49ers when he took over at center following an injury to starter Mason Cole. Gaillard made his first career start the following week against the Washington Football Team on September 20, 2020. He took a leave of absence from the Cardinals after the birth of his daughter, and the team received a roster exemption for him on December 21, 2020; he returned to the team on December 28. He was waived on July 21, 2021.

=== Cincinnati Bengals ===
On July 22, 2021, Lamont was claimed off waivers by the Cincinnati Bengals. He was waived on August 22, 2021. He re-signed with the team's practice squad on September 21, 2021.

On February 15, 2022, Lamont signed a reserve/future contract. He was waived on August 30, 2022.

=== Miami Dolphins ===
On November 2, 2022, Gaillard was signed to the Miami Dolphins practice squad. He was released on December 20.

=== DC Defenders ===
On December 18, 2023, Gaillard was signed by the DC Defenders of the XFL. He was placed on Injured reserve on May 28, 2024.

On April 1, 2025, Gaillard was released by the Defenders.

=== San Antonio Brahmas ===
On May 6, 2025, Gaillard was claimed by the San Antonio Brahmas.
