= Pine Forest High School (North Carolina) =

American public school in North Carolina

Location
- 525 Andrews Rd; Fayetteville, North Carolina 28311; United States; 35°09′17″N 78°53′12″W

Information
- School type: Public
- School district: Cumberland County Schools
- CEEB code: 341317
- Principal: Juelle McDonald
- Teaching staff: 79.41 (FTE)
- Grades: 9–12
- Enrollment: 1,602 (2023-2024)
- Student to teacher ratio: 20.17
- Colors: Green and gold
- Athletics: NCHSAA 7A
- Athletics conference: Mid-South 7A/8A
- Team name: Trojans
- Feeder schools: Pine Forest Middle, Spring Lake Middle
- Website: pfhs.ccs.k12.nc.us

Pine Forest High School is a public high school in Fayetteville, North Carolina. It is situated on Andrews Road, close to Howard Hall Elementary School, Pine Forest Middle School, and Methodist University. The mascot for Pine Forest is the Trojan warrior.

== Athletics ==
Pine Forest is member of the North Carolina High School Athletic Association (NCHSAA). Listed below are sports teams offered at Pine Forest:

=== Fall Sports ===
- Boys’ Junior Varsity Soccer
- Boys’ Varsity Soccer
- Girls’ Golf
- Girls’ Tennis
- Girls’ Junior Varsity Volleyball
- Girls’ Varsity Volleyball
- Cross Country

=== Winter Sports ===
- Boys’ Junior Varsity Basketball
- Boys’ Varsity Basketball
- Girls’ Junior Varsity Basketball
- Girls’ Varsity Basketball
- Swimming
- Wrestling
- Bowling

=== Spring Sports ===
- Boys’ Junior Varsity Baseball
- Boys’ Varsity Baseball
- Girls’ Junior Varsity Softball
- Girls’ Varsity Softball
- Girls’ Junior Varsity Soccer
- Girls’ Varsity Soccer
- Varsity Track and Field
- Boys’ Golf
- Boys’ Tennis

== Notable alumni ==
- Daniel Alvarez, professional soccer player
- Pamela Brewington Cashwell, politician, first Native American woman to head a state cabinet
- Crystal Cox, track athlete, represented Team USA at the 2004 Summer Olympics
- Charles Davenport, NFL wide receiver
- Lamont Gaillard, NFL center
- Tearrius George, CFL defensive end
- Naomi Graham, middleweight boxer, competed at 2020 Summer Olympics, first female active duty service member to compete for Team USA at the Olympics
- Julian Hill, NFL tight end
- Martin Jarmond, college athletics administrator
- Harold Landry, NFL linebacker, Pro Bowl selection in 2021
- Ernie Logan, NFL defensive lineman
- Alvin Powell, NFL offensive lineman and current drug awareness and substance abuse speaker
- Bracy Walker, NFL safety
- Wallace Wright, NFL wide receiver
- Christopher Watts, Colorado man who murdered his wife and two daughters in 2018
