= Ernie Logan =

American football player (born 1968)

No. 97, 73, 93
- Positions: Defensive end, defensive tackle

Personal information
- Born: May 18, 1968 (age 58); Fort Bragg, North Carolina, U.S.
- Listed height: 6 ft 3 in (1.91 m)
- Listed weight: 290 lb (132 kg)

Career information
- High school: Pine Forest (Fayetteville, North Carolina)
- College: East Carolina
- NFL draft: 1991: 9th round, 226th overall pick

Career history
- Atlanta Falcons (1991)*; Cleveland Browns (1991–1992); Atlanta Falcons (1993); Jacksonville Jaguars (1994–1996); New York Jets (1997–2000)
- * Offseason or practice squad member only

Career NFL statistics
- Tackles: 234
- Sacks: 11
- Forced fumbles: 2
- Stats at Pro Football Reference

Ernest Edward Logan II (born May 18, 1968) is an American former professional football player. He attended Pine Forest High School in Fayetteville, North Carolina. The 6-foot-4, 290-pound Fayetteville, North Carolina native played his college football at East Carolina University from 1986 to 1990, where he racked up 100 tackles (including 16 behind the line of scrimmage) and 5.0 quarterback sacks.

He played in the National Football League (NFL) from 1991 to 2000. He was selected by the Atlanta Falcons in the ninth round of the 1991 NFL draft with the 226th overall pick.

== Post-playing career ==
Logan is currently a line coach at IMG Academy in Bradenton, Florida, after 11 years as the defensive line coach at Jacksonville University. He also did internships with the Cleveland Browns, New England Patriots and Miami Dolphins.
