= 2023 Miami Dolphins season =

58th season in franchise history

- Owner: Stephen M. Ross
- General manager: Chris Grier
- Head coach: Mike McDaniel
- Home stadium: Hard Rock Stadium

Results
- Record: 11–6
- Division place: 2nd AFC East
- Playoffs: Lost Wild Card Playoffs (at Chiefs) 7–26
- All-Pros: WR Tyreek Hill (1st team)
- Pro Bowlers: QB Tua Tagovailoa; RB Raheem Mostert; FB Alec Ingold; WR Tyreek Hill; OT Terron Armstead; CB Jalen Ramsey

Uniform
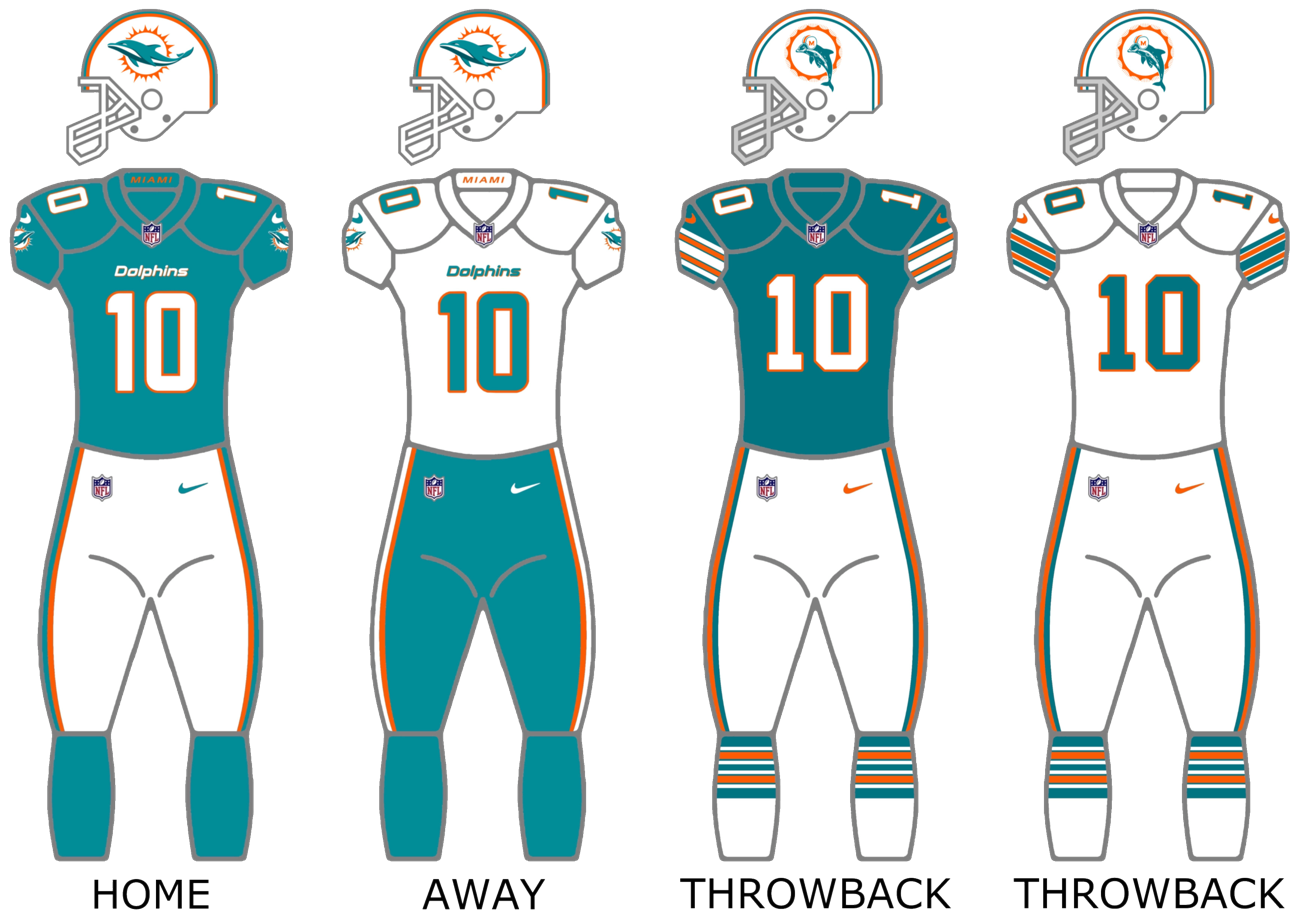

The 2023 season was the Miami Dolphins' 54th season in the National Football League (NFL), their 58th overall, their eighth under general manager Chris Grier and their second under head coach Mike McDaniel.

The Dolphins improved upon their 9–8 record from the previous two seasons after a Week 15 win over the New York Jets. With a win over the Dallas Cowboys in Week 16, they clinched a playoff spot for a second consecutive season. Despite leading the Buffalo Bills by three games with five to play, the Dolphins faltered late in the season and, combined with the Bills going undefeated since the bye, put AFC East control in their Week 18 matchup. In that game, the Dolphins lost to the Bills, giving the Bills the division due to them beating the Dolphins earlier in the season as well. The loss meant 2008 would remain the most recent season the Dolphins won the AFC East. Throughout the year, the Dolphins were noted to struggle to beat teams with winning records, having gone just 1-5 against teams that finished with a winning record.

The Dolphins once again failed to win a playoff game, not having done so since 2000, losing to the eventual repeat Super Bowl champion Kansas City Chiefs in a 26–7 loss in one of the coldest games in NFL history. This game was Tyreek Hill, Justin Houston, Melvin Ingram, and Emmanuel Ogbah's return to Arrowhead. With the Detroit Lions defeating the Los Angeles Rams and advancing to the NFC Divisional round the following day, the Dolphins officially hold the longest active playoff victory drought in the NFL.

In their Week three 70–20 victory over the Denver Broncos, the Dolphins became the first NFL team to score 70 points in a game since 1966. This was the second most points scored in a regular-season game all time.

The Miami Dolphins drew an average home attendance of 65,922 in 9 home games in the 2023 NFL season.

== Offseason ==
On January 19, 2023, the Dolphins parted ways with defensive coordinator Josh Boyer.

After firing Boyer, the Dolphins signed long time defensive coordinator Vic Fangio (well known for his defense being consistently ranked top 5 in major categories) to a contract making him the highest paid defensive coordinator in the NFL.

On March 12, the Dolphins agreed in principle to a trade with the Los Angeles Rams in which they acquired six-time Pro Bowl cornerback Jalen Ramsey in exchange for tight end Hunter Long and a 2023 3rd round pick. The Rams used the pick to select Tennessee defensive end Byron Young. The trade was officially announced 3 days later after the start of the NFL league year.

=== Free agent signings ===
Free agent signings in the 2023 Miami Dolphins season
Position	Player	Age	2022 Team	Contract
QB	Mike White	28	New York Jets	2 years, $8 million
ILB	David Long Jr.	26	Tennessee Titans	2 years, $11 million
OLB	Malik Reed	26	Pittsburgh Steelers	1 year, $1 million
WR	Braxton Berrios	27	New York Jets	1 year, $3.5 million
FS	DeShon Elliott	26	Detroit Lions	1 year, $1 million
TE	Eric Saubert	29	Denver Broncos	1 year, $1 million
G	Dan Feeney	28	New York Jets	1 year, $3.25 million
P	Jake Bailey	25	New England Patriots	1 year, $1 million
T	Isaiah Wynn	27	New England Patriots	1 year, $1 million
T	Cedric Ogbuehi	31	New York Jets	1 year, $1 million

== Draft ==
2023 Miami Dolphins draft selections
Round	Selection	Player	Position	College	Notes
1	–	Selection forfeited (Note: The Dolphins forfeited their first-round selection as well as a 2024 third-round selection as punishment for multiple violations of the league's anti-tampering policy in conversations with quarterback Tom Brady and Don Yee, the agent for then-New Orleans Saints coach Sean Payton (as well as Brady).)			
1	29	Traded to the Denver Broncos (Note: The Dolphins traded a first-round selection (29th overall), a 2024 fourth-round selection and RB Chase Edmonds to the Denver Broncos in exchange for a 2025 fifth-round selection and LB Bradley Chubb.)			From 49ers (Note: The Dolphins traded a 2021 first-round pick (3rd overall) to the San Francisco 49ers in exchange for a first-round pick (29th overall), a 2021 first-round pick (12th overall), and 2022 first- and third-round picks (29th and 102nd overall).)
2	51	Cam Smith	CB	South Carolina	
3	77	Traded to the Los Angeles Rams (Note: The Dolphins traded a third-round selection (77th overall) and TE Hunter Long to the Los Angeles Rams in exchange for CB Jalen Ramsey.)			From Patriots (Note: The Dolphins traded a 2022 fifth-round selection and WR DeVante Parker to the New England Patriots in exchange for a third-round selection (77th overall).)
3	84	De'Von Achane	RB	Texas A&M	
4	122	Traded to the Kansas City Chiefs (Note: The Dolphins traded fourth- and sixth-round selections (122nd and 178th overall), and 2022 first, second, and fourth-round selections to the Kansas City Chiefs in exchange for WR Tyreek Hill.)			
5	155	Traded to the San Francisco 49ers (Note: The Dolphins traded a fifth-round selection (155th overall) to San Francisco 49ers in exchange for RB Jeff Wilson.)			
6	178	Traded to the Kansas City Chiefs			From Bears (Note: The Dolphins traded WR Jakeem Grant to the Chicago Bears in exchange for a sixth-round selection (178th overall).)
6	197	Elijah Higgins	WR	Stanford	
7	238	Ryan Hayes	OT	Michigan	

2023 Miami Dolphins undrafted free agents
Position	Player	College
LB	Mitchell Agude	Miami (FL)
QB	James Blackman	Arkansas State
CB	Ethan Bonner	Stanford
RB	Christopher Brooks	BYU
DE	Randy Charlton	Mississippi State
WR	Chris Coleman	Cal Poly
WR	Daewood Davis	Western Kentucky
TE	Julian Hill	Campbell
T	Jarrett Horst	Michigan State
T	Alex Jensen	South Dakota
LB	Aubrey Miller	Jackson State
DT	Anthony Montalvo	UCF
LB	Garrett Nelson	Nebraska
DT	Brandon Pili	USC
G	DJ Scaife	Miami (FL)
S	Keidron Smith	Kentucky
T	James Tunstall	Cincinnati
P	Michael Turk	Oklahoma
C	Alama Uluave	San Diego State
LB	Zeke Vandenburgh	Illinois State
S	Bennett Williams	Oregon

Draft trades

== Personnel ==
=== Staff / Coaches ===
2023 Miami Dolphins staff
Front office: Chairman/managing general partner – Stephen Ross; Vice chairman/partner – Bruce Beal; Vice chairman – Jorge Pérez; Vice chairman – Matt Higgins; Vice chairman, president, and CEO – Tom Garfinkel; General manager – Chris Grier; Assistant general manager – Marvin Allen; Vice president, football administration – Brandon Shore; Senior vice president, chief financial officer – Chris Clements; Senior personnel executive – Reggie McKenzie; Co-director, player personnel – Adam Engroff; Co-director, player personnel – Anthony Hunt; Director of college scouting – Matt Winston; Senior scout – Jim Abrams; Special advisor to the vice chairman, president, and CEO – Dan Marino; Head coaches: Head coach – Mike McDaniel; Associate head coach/running backs – Eric Studesville; Assistant head coach/tight ends – Jon Embree; Offensive coaches: Offensive coordinator – Frank Smith; Quarterbacks/passing game coordinator – Darrell Bevell; Assistant quarterbacks – Chandler Henley; Wide receivers – Wes Welker; Offensive line – Butch Barry; Assistant offensive line – Lemuel Jeanpierre; Offensive assistant – Ricardo Allen; Offensive assistant – Mike Judge; Offensive assistant – Max McCaffrey; Offensive assistant – Kolby Smith; Quality control – Josh Grizzard	Defensive coaches: Defensive coordinator – Vic Fangio; Defensive line – Austin Clark; Assistant defensive line – Kenny Baker; Linebackers – Anthony Campanile; Outside linebackers – Ryan Slowik; Passing game coordinator/secondary – Renaldo Hill; Cornerbacks/pass game specialist – Sam Madison; Safeties – Joe Kasper; Assistant defensive backs – Mathieu Araujo; Senior assistant – Wade Harman; Defensive assistant – Steve Donatell; Special teams coaches: Special teams coordinator – Danny Crossman; Assistant special teams – Brendan Farrell; Strength and conditioning: Head strength and conditioning – Dave Puloka; Assistant strength and conditioning – Adam Lachance

=== Final roster ===
2023 Miami Dolphins roster
Quarterbacks (QB): 1 Tua Tagovailoa; 6 Skylar Thompson; 14 Mike White; Running backs (RB): 28 De'Von Achane; 35 Chris Brooks; 30 Alec Ingold FB; 31 Raheem Mostert; 23 Jeff Wilson; Wide receivers (WR): 0 Braxton Berrios; 3 Robbie Chosen; 83 Chase Claypool; 85 River Cracraft; 10 Tyreek Hill; 17 Jaylen Waddle; 11 Cedrick Wilson Jr.; Tight ends (TE): 89 Julian Hill; 82 Tyler Kroft; 81 Durham Smythe	Offensive linemen (OL): 72 Terron Armstead T; 66 Lester Cotton G; 74 Liam Eichenberg C; 60 Jonotthan Harrison C; 68 Robert Hunt G; 73 Austin Jackson T; 65 Robert Jones G; 70 Kendall Lamm T; 71 Kion Smith T; Defensive linemen (DL): 98 Raekwon Davis NT; 93 Da'Shawn Hand DE; 92 Zach Sieler DE; 94 Christian Wilkins DE	Linebackers (LB): 52 Justin Houston OLB; 9 Melvin Ingram OLB; 46 Bruce Irvin OLB; 51 David Long Jr. ILB; 50 Calvin Munson ILB; 91 Emmanuel Ogbah OLB; 45 Duke Riley ILB; 41 Channing Tindall ILB; Defensive backs (DB): 33 Eli Apple CB; 20 Justin Bethel CB; 22 Elijah Campbell FS; 21 DeShon Elliott SS; 8 Jevon Holland FS; 25 Xavien Howard CB; 29 Brandon Jones SS; 4 Kader Kohou CB; 40 Nik Needham CB; 5 Jalen Ramsey CB; 24 Cam Smith CB; Special teams (ST): 16 Jake Bailey P; 44 Blake Ferguson LS; 7 Jason Sanders K	Practice squad: 56 Quinton Bell OLB; 38 Ethan Bonner CB; 88 Nick Bowers TE; 80 Tanner Conner TE; 95 Byron Cowart DE; 78 Justin Ellis NT; 37 Darrynton Evans RB; 76 Ryan Hayes T; 63 Chasen Hines G; 42 A. J. Johnson ILB (PS/I); 34 Parry Nickerson CB; 96 Brandon Pili NT; 47 Malik Reed OLB; 86 Braylon Sanders WR; 84 Anthony Schwartz WR; 64 Matt Skura C; 87 Freddie Swain WR; Reserve: 26 Salvon Ahmed RB (IR); 55 Jerome Baker ILB (IR); 2 Bradley Chubb OLB (IR); 27 Keion Crossen CB (IR); 18 Erik Ezukanma WR (NF-Inj.); 53 Cameron Goode OLB (IR); 15 Jaelan Phillips OLB (IR); 57 Zeke Vandenburgh ILB (IR); 43 Andrew Van Ginkel OLB (IR); 58 Connor Williams C (IR); 77 Isaiah Wynn G (IR); Rookies in italics 53 active, 11 reserve, 16 practice squad (1 exempt)

== Preseason ==
Week	Date	Opponent	Result	Record	Venue	Recap
1	August 11	Atlanta Falcons	L 3–19	0–1	Hard Rock Stadium	Recap
2	August 19	at Houston Texans	W 28–3	1–1	NRG Stadium	Recap
3	August 26 (Note: Due to an injury involving Daewood Davis, the game was terminated with around eight minutes to go in the fourth quarter.)	at Jacksonville Jaguars	L 18–31	1–2	EverBank Stadium	Recap

== Regular season ==
=== Schedule ===
Week	Date	Opponent	Result	Record	Venue	Recap
1	September 10	at Los Angeles Chargers	**W** 36–34	1–0	SoFi Stadium	Recap
2	September 17	at **New England Patriots**	**W** 24–17	2–0	Gillette Stadium	Recap
3	September 24	Denver Broncos	**W** 70–20	3–0	Hard Rock Stadium	Recap
4	October 1	at **Buffalo Bills**	**L** 20–48	3–1	Highmark Stadium	Recap
5	October 8	New York Giants	**W** 31–16	4–1	Hard Rock Stadium	Recap
6	October 15	Carolina Panthers	**W** 42–21	5–1	Hard Rock Stadium	Recap
7	October 22	at Philadelphia Eagles	**L** 17–31	5–2	Lincoln Financial Field	Recap
8	October 29	**New England Patriots**	**W** 31–17	6–2	Hard Rock Stadium	Recap
9	November 5	at Kansas City Chiefs	**L** 14–21	6–3	(Germany) Deutsche Bank Park (Frankfurt)	Recap
10	Bye					
11	November 19	Las Vegas Raiders	**W** 20–13	7–3	Hard Rock Stadium	Recap
12	November 24	at **New York Jets**	**W** 34–13	8–3	MetLife Stadium	Recap
13	December 3	at Washington Commanders	**W** 45–15	9–3	FedExField	Recap
14	December 11	Tennessee Titans	**L** 27–28	9–4	Hard Rock Stadium	Recap
15	December 17	**New York Jets**	**W** 30–0	10–4	Hard Rock Stadium	Recap
16	December 24	Dallas Cowboys	**W** 22–20	11–4	Hard Rock Stadium	Recap
17	December 31	at Baltimore Ravens	**L** 19–56	11–5	M&T Bank Stadium	Recap
18	January 7	**Buffalo Bills**	**L** 14–21	11–6	Hard Rock Stadium	Recap

Note: Intra-division opponents are in bold text.

=== Game summaries ===
==== Week 1: at Los Angeles Chargers ====
Week 1: Miami Dolphins at Los Angeles Chargers – Game summary

Quarter	1	2	3	4	Total
**Dolphins**	7	13	7	9	**36**
Chargers	7	10	7	10	**34**

at SoFi Stadium, Inglewood, California

- Date: September 10
- Game time: 4:25 p.m. EDT/1:25 p.m. PDT
- Game weather: None (Retractable roof closed)
- Game attendance: 70,240
- Referee: Brad Allen
- TV announcers (CBS): Kevin Harlan, Trent Green and Melanie Collins
- Recap, Game Book

Game information

**First quarter**

- LAC – Austin Ekeler 1-yard run (Cameron Dicker kick), 4:39. Chargers 7–0. **Drive: 14 plays, 94 yards, 7:23.**
- MIA – Raheem Mostert 2-yard run (Jason Sanders kick), 1:15. Tied 7–7. **Drive: 9 plays, 75 yards, 3:24.**

**Second quarter**

- MIA – Jason Sanders 23-yard field goal, 11:43. Dolphins 10–7. **Drive: 8 plays, 72 yards, 3:03.**
- LAC – Donald Parham 1-yard pass from Justin Herbert (Cameron Dicker kick), 9:07. Chargers 14–10. **Drive: 6 plays, 75 yards, 2:36.**
- MIA – River Cracraft 1-yard pass from Tua Tagovailoa (Jason Sanders kick), 1:49. Dolphins 17–14. **Drive: 12 plays, 80 yards, 4:52.**
- LAC – Cameron Dicker 50-yard field goal, 0:09. Tied 17–17. **Drive: 10 plays, 43 yards, 1:33.**
- MIA – Jason Sanders 41-yard field goal, 0:00. Dolphins 20–17. **Drive: 2 plays, 52 yards, 0:09.**

**Third quarter**

- LAC – Justin Herbert 1-yard run (Cameron Dicker kick), 9:16. Chargers 24–20. **Drive: 11 plays, 75 yards, 5:41.**
- MIA – Tyreek Hill 35-yard pass from Tua Tagovailoa (Jason Sanders kick), 2:12. Dolphins 27–24. **Drive: 1 play, 35 yards, 0:06.**

**Fourth quarter**

- LAC – Joshua Kelley 2-yard run (Cameron Dicker kick), 14:00. Chargers 31–27. **Drive: 10 plays, 75 yards, 3:12.**
- MIA – Jason Sanders 45-yard field goal, 10:03. Chargers 31–30. **Drive: 9 plays, 48 yards, 3:57.**
- LAC – Cameron Dicker 25-yard field goal, 3:53. Chargers 34–30. **Drive: 13 plays, 68 yards, 6:10.**
- MIA – Tyreek Hill 4-yard pass from Tua Tagovailoa (kick failed), 1:45. Dolphins 36–34. **Drive: 8 plays, 75 yards, 2:08.**

**Top passers**

- MIA – Tua Tagovailoa – 28/45, 466 yards, 3 TD, INT
- LAC – Justin Herbert – 23/33, 228 yards, TD

**Top rushers**

- MIA – Raheem Mostert – 10 rushes, 37 yards, TD
- LAC – Austin Ekeler – 16 rushes, 117 yards, TD

**Top receivers**

- MIA – Tyreek Hill – 11 receptions, 215 yards, 2 TD
- LAC – Keenan Allen – 6 receptions, 76 yards

In a back-and-forth affair, the Dolphins got the better of the matchup, beating the Chargers 36–34. The Dolphins started off the season 1–0.

==== Week 2: at New England Patriots ====
Week 2: Miami Dolphins at New England Patriots – Game summary

Quarter	1	2	3	4	Total
**Dolphins**	3	14	0	7	**24**
Patriots	0	3	0	14	**17**

at Gillette Stadium, Foxborough, Massachusetts

- Date: September 17
- Game time: 8:20 p.m. EDT
- Game weather: Clear, 63 °F (17 °C)
- Game attendance: 64,628
- Referee: Shawn Smith
- TV announcers (NBC): Mike Tirico, Cris Collinsworth and Melissa Stark
- Recap, Game Book

Game information

**First quarter**

- MIA – Jason Sanders 23-yard field goal, 3:00. Dolphins 3–0. **Drive: 13 plays, 81 yards, 7:13.**

**Second quarter**

- MIA – Raheem Mostert 8-yard run (Jason Sanders kick), 9:39. Dolphins 10–0. **Drive: 11 plays, 73 yards, 5:21.**
- NE – Chad Ryland 49-yard field goal, 1:49. Dolphins 10–3. **Drive: 8 plays, 73 yards, 1:38.**
- MIA – Tyreek Hill 2-yard pass from Tua Tagovailoa (Jason Sanders kick), 0:11. Dolphins 17–3. **Drive: 8 plays, 75 yards, 1:38.**

**Third quarter**

- No scoring plays.

**Fourth quarter**

- NE – Hunter Henry 6-yard pass from Mac Jones (Chad Ryland kick), 11:21. Dolphins 17–10. **Drive: 8 plays, 58 yards, 3:26.**
- MIA – Raheem Mostert 43-yard run (Jason Sanders kick), 8:45. Dolphins 24–10. **Drive: 1 play, 43 yards, 0:07.**
- NE – Rhamondre Stevenson 2-yard run (Chad Ryland kick), 5:25. Dolphins 24–17. **Drive: 9 plays, 75 yards, 3:20.**

**Top passers**

- MIA – Tua Tagovailoa – 21/30, 249 yards, TD, INT
- NE – Mac Jones – 31/42, 231 yards, TD, INT

**Top rushers**

- MIA – Raheem Mostert – 18 rushes, 121 yards, 2 TD
- NE – Rhamondre Stevenson – 15 rushes, 50 yards, TD

**Top receivers**

- MIA – Jaylen Waddle – 4 receptions, 86 yards
- NE – DeVante Parker – 6 receptions, 57 yards

==== Week 3: vs. Denver Broncos ====
Week 3: Denver Broncos at Miami Dolphins – Game summary

Quarter	1	2	3	4	Total
Broncos	7	6	0	7	**20**
**Dolphins**	14	21	14	21	**70**

at Hard Rock Stadium, Miami Gardens, Florida

- Date: September 24
- Game time: 1:00 p.m. EDT
- Game weather: Partly cloudy, 86 °F (30 °C)
- Game attendance: 65,522
- Referee: Clay Martin
- TV announcers (CBS): Kevin Harlan, Trent Green and Melanie Collins
- Recap, Game Book

Game information

**First quarter**

- MIA – Tyreek Hill 54-yard pass from Tua Tagovailoa (Jason Sanders kick), 13:37. Dolphins 7–0. **Drive: 3 plays, 75 yards, 1:23.**
- MIA – De'Von Achane 8-yard run (Jason Sanders kick), 6:31. Dolphins 14–0. **Drive: 9 plays, 81 yards, 5:33.**
- DEN – Courtland Sutton 12-yard pass from Russell Wilson (Wil Lutz kick), 1:12. Dolphins 14–7. **Drive: 10 plays, 75 yards, 5:19.**

**Second quarter**

- MIA – De'Von Achane 4-yard pass from Tua Tagovailoa (Jason Sanders kick), 10:16. Dolphins 21–7. **Drive: 14 plays, 75 yards, 5:56.**
- DEN – Wil Lutz 31-yard field goal, 6:36. Dolphins 21–10. **Drive: 8 plays, 62 yards, 3:40.**
- MIA – Raheem Mostert 20-yard run (Jason Sanders kick), 1:49. Dolphins 28–10. **Drive: 6 plays, 86 yards, 1:20.**
- MIA – Raheem Mostert 3-yard run (Jason Sanders kick), 1:29. Dolphins 35–10. **Drive: 1 play, 3 yards, 1:29.**
- DEN – Wil Lutz 25-yard field goal, 0:03. Dolphins 35–13. **Drive: 9 plays, 68 yards, 1:26.**

**Third quarter**

- MIA – Raheem Mostert 1-yard run (Jason Sanders kick), 7:48. Dolphins 42–13. **Drive: 11 plays, 90 yards, 4:29.**
- MIA – Raheem Mostert 19-yard pass from Tua Tagovailoa (Jason Sanders kick), 0:29. Dolphins 49–13. **Drive: 9 plays, 77 yards, 4:44.**

**Fourth quarter**

- MIA – De'Von Achane 10-yard pass from Tua Tagovailoa (Jason Sanders kick), 14:55. Dolphins 56–13. **Drive: 2 plays, 8 yards, 0:20.**
- MIA – Robbie Chosen 68-yard pass from Mike White (Jason Sanders kick), 9:05. Dolphins 63–13. **Drive: 3 plays, 68 yards, 1:23.**
- DEN – Marvin Mims 99-yard kickoff return (Wil Lutz kick), 8:50. Dolphins 63–20.
- MIA – De'Von Achane 67-yard run (Jason Sanders kick), 8:01. Dolphins 70–20. **Drive: 2 plays, 75 yards, 0:49.**

**Top passers**

- DEN – Russell Wilson – 23/38, 306 yards, TD, INT
- MIA – Tua Tagovailoa – 23/26, 309 yards, 4 TD

**Top rushers**

- DEN – Javonte Williams – 11 rushes, 42 yards
- MIA – De'Von Achane – 18 rushes, 203 yards, 2 TD

**Top receivers**

- DEN – Courtland Sutton – 8 receptions, 91 yards, TD
- MIA – Tyreek Hill – 9 receptions, 157 yards, TD

The 70 points scored by the Dolphins are the highest by any team since the 1966 Washington Redskins scored 72 points in a game, and tied with the third highest points scored in NFL history. Miami had the opportunity to tie the single-game points record with 33 seconds remaining, but opted to kneel the football instead of attempting a 45-yard field goal. In addition to the 70 points scored, the Dolphins had 726 total yards, the second-most in league history, behind only the mark of 735 set by the Los Angeles Rams in a 1951 game against the New York Yanks. They also became the first team in NFL history to gain 350 rushing and 350 passing yards in one game, and also are the first team in NFL history to score 5 passing and 5 rushing touchdowns in the same game.

==== Week 4: at Buffalo Bills ====
Week 4: Miami Dolphins at Buffalo Bills – Game summary

Quarter	1	2	3	4	Total
Dolphins	7	7	6	0	**20**
**Bills**	14	17	10	7	**48**

at Highmark Stadium, Orchard Park, New York

- Date: October 1
- Game time: 1:00 p.m. EDT
- Game weather: Sunny, fair, 70 °F (21 °C)
- Game attendance: 70,881
- Referee: Adrian Hill
- TV announcers (CBS): Jim Nantz, Tony Romo and Tracy Wolfson
- Recap, Game Book

Game information

**First quarter**

- BUF – Gabe Davis 18-yard pass from Josh Allen (Tyler Bass kick), 10:41. Bills 7–0. **Drive: 8 plays, 75 yards, 4:19.**
- MIA – De'Von Achane 3-yard run (Jason Sanders kick), 6:30. Tied 7–7. **Drive: 7 plays, 77 yards, 4:11.**
- BUF – James Cook 1-yard run (Tyler Bass kick), 1:10. Bills 14–7. **Drive: 10 plays, 80 yards, 5:20.**

**Second quarter**

- MIA – De'Von Achane 10-yard run (Jason Sanders kick), 12:47. Tied 14–14. **Drive: 7 plays, 70 yards, 3:23.**
- BUF – Stefon Diggs 11-yard pass from Josh Allen (Tyler Bass kick), 10:02. Bills 21–14. **Drive: 5 plays, 79 yards, 2:45.**
- BUF – Stefon Diggs 55-yard pass from Josh Allen (Tyler Bass kick), 2:58. Bills 28–14. **Drive: 2 plays, 59 yards, 0:53.**
- BUF – Tyler Bass 53-yard field goal, 1:39. Bills 31–14. **Drive: 4 plays, −4 yards, 0:35.**

**Third quarter**

- MIA – Braxton Berrios 11-yard pass from Tua Tagovailoa (pass failed), 9:30. Bills 31–20. **Drive: 11 plays, 75 yards, 5:30.**
- BUF – Tyler Bass 33-yard field goal, 5:21. Bills 34–20. **Drive: 7 plays, 60 yards, 4:09.**
- BUF – Stefon Diggs 13-yard pass from Josh Allen (Tyler Bass kick), 3:00. Bills 41–20. **Drive: 4 plays, 25 yards, 2:03.**

**Fourth quarter**

- BUF – Josh Allen 11-yard run (Tyler Bass kick), 14:55. Bills 48–20. **Drive: 2 plays, 45 yards, 0:44.**

**Top passers**

- MIA – Tua Tagovailoa – 25/35, 282 yards, TD, INT
- BUF – Josh Allen – 21/25, 320 yards, 4 TD

**Top rushers**

- MIA – De'Von Achane – 8 rushes, 101 yards, 2 TD
- BUF – Latavius Murray – 4 rushes, 32 yards

**Top receivers**

- MIA – Tyreek Hill – 3 receptions, 58 yards
- BUF – Stefon Diggs – 6 receptions, 120 yards, 3 TD

A week after their historic performance, the Dolphins lost their first game of the regular season, falling to 3–1.

==== Week 5: vs. New York Giants ====
Week 5: New York Giants at Miami Dolphins – Game summary

Quarter	1	2	3	4	Total
Giants	0	10	3	3	**16**
**Dolphins**	7	10	14	0	**31**

at Hard Rock Stadium, Miami Gardens, Florida

- Date: October 8
- Game time: 1:00 p.m. EDT
- Game weather: Partly cloudy, 88 °F (31 °C)
- Game attendance: 65,654
- Referee: Ronald Torbert
- TV announcers (Fox): Kenny Albert, Jonathan Vilma and Shannon Spake
- Recap, Game Book

Game information

**First quarter**

- MIA – Jaylen Waddle 2-yard pass from Tua Tagovailoa (Jason Sanders kick), 7:09. Dolphins 7–0. **Drive: 8 plays, 89 yards, 4:18.**

**Second quarter**

- MIA – De'Von Achane 76-yard run (Jason Sanders kick), 10:02. Dolphins 14–0. **Drive: 3 plays, 94 yards, 0:58.**
- NYG – Graham Gano 49-yard field goal, 3:41. Dolphins 14–3. **Drive: 13 plays, 44 yards, 6:21.**
- NYG – Jason Pinnock 102-yard interception return (Graham Gano kick), 1:40. Dolphins 14–10.
- MIA – Jason Sanders 40-yard field goal, 0:00. Dolphins 17–10. **Drive: 9 plays, 50 yards, 1:40.**

**Third quarter**

- MIA – Tyreek Hill 69-yard pass from Tua Tagovailoa (Jason Sanders kick), 14:06. Dolphins 24–10. **Drive: 3 plays, 75 yards, 0:54.**
- NYG – Graham Gano 37-yard field goal, 4:26. Dolphins 24–13. **Drive: 4 plays, 4 yards, 2:18.**
- MIA – Raheem Mostert 2-yard run (Jason Sanders kick), 0:00. Dolphins 31–13. **Drive: 8 plays, 75 yards, 4:26.**

**Fourth quarter**

- NYG – Graham Gano 51-yard field goal, 8:51. Dolphins 31–16. **Drive: 10 plays, 18 yards, 3:54.**

**Top passers**

- NYG – Daniel Jones – 14/20, 119 yards
- MIA – Tua Tagovailoa – 22/30, 308 yards, 2 TD, 2 INT

**Top rushers**

- NYG – Eric Gray – 12 rushes, 25 yards
- MIA – De'Von Achane – 11 rushes, 151 yards, TD

**Top receivers**

- NYG – Darren Waller – 8 receptions, 86 yards
- MIA – Tyreek Hill – 8 receptions, 181 yards, TD

==== Week 6: vs. Carolina Panthers ====
Week 6: Carolina Panthers at Miami Dolphins – Game summary

Quarter	1	2	3	4	Total
Panthers	14	0	0	7	**21**
**Dolphins**	0	21	7	14	**42**

at Hard Rock Stadium, Miami Gardens, Florida

- Date: October 15
- Game time: 1:00 p.m. EDT
- Game weather: Sunny, 87 °F (31 °C)
- Game attendance: 65,529
- Referee: Craig Wrolstad
- TV announcers (CBS): Kevin Harlan, Trent Green and Melanie Collins
- Recap, Game Book

Game information

**First quarter**

- CAR – Chuba Hubbard 6-yard run (Eddy Piñeiro kick), 7:13. Panthers 7–0. **Drive: 7 plays, 64 yards, 3:47.**
- CAR – Adam Thielen 8-yard pass from Bryce Young (Eddy Piñeiro kick), 0:06. Panthers 14–0. **Drive: 10 plays, 74 yards, 5:21.**

**Second quarter**

- MIA – Raheem Mostert 3-yard pass from Tua Tagovailoa (Jason Sanders kick), 11:13. Panthers 14–7. **Drive: 9 plays, 75 yards, 3:53.**
- MIA – Jaylen Waddle 4-yard pass from Tua Tagovailoa (Jason Sanders kick), 7:00. Tied 14–14. **Drive: 3 plays, 57 yards, 1:20.**
- MIA – Tyreek Hill 41-yard pass from Tua Tagovailoa (Jason Sanders kick), 1:54. Dolphins 21–14. **Drive: 9 plays, 72 yards, 3:07.**

**Third quarter**

- MIA – Raheem Mostert 4-yard run (Jason Sanders kick), 6:21. Dolphins 28–14. **Drive: 8 plays, 91 yards, 5:11.**
- MIA – Raheem Mostert 1-yard run (Jason Sanders kick), 12:23. Dolphins 35–14. **Drive: 12 plays, 76 yards, 5:05.**
- CAR – Troy Hill 61-yard interception return (Eddy Piñeiro kick), 4:26. Dolphins 35–21.

**Fourth quarter**

- MIA – Salvon Ahmed 9-yard run (Jason Sanders kick), 2:31. Dolphins 42–21. **Drive: 5 plays, 37 yards, 1:55.**

**Top passers**

- CAR – Bryce Young – 23/38, 217 yards, TD
- MIA – Tua Tagovailoa – 21/31, 262 yards, 3 TD

**Top rushers**

- CAR – Chuba Hubbard – 19 rushes, 88 yards, TD
- MIA – Raheem Mostert – 17 rushes, 115 yards, 2 TD

**Top receivers**

- CAR – Adam Thielen – 11 receptions, 115 yards, TD
- MIA – Tyreek Hill – 6 receptions, 163 yards, TD

==== Week 7: at Philadelphia Eagles ====
Week 7: Miami Dolphins at Philadelphia Eagles – Game summary

Quarter	1	2	3	4	Total
Dolphins	3	7	7	0	**17**
**Eagles**	3	14	7	7	**31**

at Lincoln Financial Field, Philadelphia, Pennsylvania

- Date: October 22
- Game time: 8:20 p.m. EDT
- Game weather: Partly cloudy, 55 °F (13 °C)
- Game attendance: 69,879
- Referee: Brad Allen
- TV announcers (NBC): Mike Tirico, Cris Collinsworth and Melissa Stark
- Recap, Game Book

Game information

**First quarter**

- PHI – Jake Elliott 24-yard field goal, 7:54. Eagles 3–0. **Drive: 12 plays, 71 yards, 7:06.**
- MIA – Jason Sanders 40-yard field goal, 0:59. Tied 3–3. **Drive: 7 plays, 1 yard, 3:25.**

**Second quarter**

- PHI – Dallas Goedert 19-yard pass from Jalen Hurts (Jake Elliott kick), 11:25. Eagles 10–3. **Drive: 9 plays, 61 yards, 4:34.**
- PHI – Jalen Hurts 1-yard run (Jake Elliott kick), 3:10. Eagles 17–3. **Drive: 12 plays, 80 yards, 6:49.**
- MIA – Tyreek Hill 27-yard pass from Tua Tagovailoa (Jason Sanders kick), 0:39. Eagles 17–10. **Drive: 8 plays, 72 yards, 2:31.**

**Third quarter**

- MIA – Jerome Baker 22-yard interception return (Jason Sanders kick), 4:02. Tied 17–17.
- PHI – A. J. Brown 14-yard pass from Jalen Hurts (Jake Elliott kick), 0:15. Eagles 24–17. **Drive: 8 plays, 75 yards, 3:47.**

**Fourth quarter**

- PHI – Kenneth Gainwell 3-yard run (Jake Elliott kick), 4:46. Eagles 31–17. **Drive: 13 plays, 83 yards, 6:35.**

**Top passers**

- MIA – Tua Tagovailoa – 23/32, 216 yards, TD, INT
- PHI – Jalen Hurts – 23/31, 279 yards, 2 TD, INT

**Top rushers**

- MIA – Raheem Mostert – 9 rushes, 45 yards
- PHI – D'Andre Swift – 15 rushes, 62 yards

**Top receivers**

- MIA – Tyreek Hill – 11 receptions, 88 yards, TD
- PHI – A. J. Brown – 10 receptions, 137 yards, TD

==== Week 8: vs. New England Patriots ====
Week 8: New England Patriots at Miami Dolphins – Game summary

Quarter	1	2	3	4	Total
Patriots	7	0	3	7	**17**
**Dolphins**	7	10	7	7	**31**

at Hard Rock Stadium, Miami Gardens, Florida

- Date: October 29
- Game time: 1:00 p.m. EDT
- Game weather: Partly cloudy, 83 °F (28 °C)
- Game attendance: 65,836
- Referee: Land Clark
- TV announcers (CBS): Spero Dedes, Adam Archuleta and Aditi Kinkhabwala
- Recap, Game Book

Game information

**First quarter**

- NE – Kendrick Bourne 24-yard pass from Mac Jones (Chad Ryland kick), 3:32. Patriots 7–0. **Drive: 3 plays, 30 yards, 0:54.**
- MIA – Tyreek Hill 42-yard pass from Tua Tagovailoa (Jason Sanders kick), 0:22. Tied 7–7. **Drive: 6 plays, 75 yards, 3:10.**

**Second quarter**

- MIA – Cedrick Wilson Jr. 1-yard pass from Tua Tagovailoa (Jason Sanders kick), 6:10. Dolphins 14–7. **Drive: 14 plays, 53 yard, 7:25.**
- MIA – Jason Sanders 30-yard field goal, 0:26. Dolphins 17–7. **Drive: 8 plays, 28 yards, 1:22.**

**Third quarter**

- NE – Chad Ryland 38-yard field goal, 12:45. Dolphins 17–10. **Drive: 4 plays, 1 yard, 2:10.**
- MIA – Raheem Mostert 1-yard run (Jason Sanders kick), 7:35. Dolphins 24–10. **Drive: 9 plays, 77 yards, 5:10.**

**Fourth quarter**

- NE – JuJu Smith-Schuster 3-yard pass from Mac Jones (Chad Ryland kick), 8:30. Dolphins 24–17. **Drive: 13 plays, 81 yards, 5:17.**
- MIA – Jaylen Waddle 31-yard pass from Tua Tagovailoa (Jason Sanders kick), 2:43. Dolphins 31–17. **Drive: 10 plays, 75 yards, 5:47.**

**Top passers**

- MIA – Mac Jones – 19/29, 161 yards, 2 TD, INT
- NE – Tua Tagovailoa – 30/45, 324 yards, 3 TD, INT

**Top rushers**

- NE – Rhamondre Stevenson – 10 rushes, 39 yards
- MIA – Raheem Mostert – 13 rushes, 46 yards, TD

**Top receivers**

- NE – Demario Douglas – 5 receptions, 25 yards
- MIA – Tyreek Hill – 8 receptions, 112 yards, TD

==== Week 9: at Kansas City Chiefs ====
NFL Germany games

Week 9: Miami Dolphins at Kansas City Chiefs – Game summary

Quarter	1	2	3	4	Total
Dolphins	0	0	14	0	**14**
**Chiefs**	7	14	0	0	**21**

at Deutsche Bank Park, Frankfurt, Hesse, Germany

- Date: November 5
- Game time: 3:30 p.m. CET/9:30 a.m. EST
- Game weather: Light rain, 53 °F (12 °C)
- Game attendance: 50,023
- Referee: Clay Martin
- TV announcers (WTVJ/NFLN): Rich Eisen, Jason McCourty, Dan Orlovsky, Stacey Dales and Sara Walsh
- Recap, Game Book

Game information

**First quarter**

- KC – Rashee Rice 11-yard pass from Patrick Mahomes (Harrison Butker kick), 12:03. Chiefs 7–0. **Drive: 7 plays, 75 yards, 2:57.**

**Second quarter**

- KC – Jerick McKinnon 17-yard pass from Patrick Mahomes (Harrison Butker kick), 2:31. Chiefs 14–0. **Drive: 13 plays, 95 yards, 8:28.**
- KC – Bryan Cook 59-yard fumble return (Harrison Butker kick), 0:33. Chiefs 21–0.

**Third quarter**

- MIA – Cedrick Wilson Jr. 31-yard pass from Tua Tagovailoa (Jason Sanders kick), 4:47. Chiefs 21–7. **Drive: 8 plays, 80 yards, 5:10.**
- MIA – Raheem Mostert 13-yard run (Jason Sanders kick), 0:22. Chiefs 21–14. **Drive: 4 plays, 27 yards, 1:50.**

**Fourth quarter**

- No scoring plays.

**Top passers**

- MIA – Tua Tagovailoa – 21/34, 193 yards, TD
- KC – Patrick Mahomes – 20/30, 185 yards, 2 TD

**Top rushers**

- MIA – Raheem Mostert – 12 rushes, 85 yards, TD
- KC – Isiah Pacheco – 16 rushes, 66 yards

**Top receivers**

- MIA – Tyreek Hill – 8 receptions, 62 yards
- KC – Noah Gray – 3 receptions, 34 yards

This was Tyreek Hill's first game against the team he had once played for. This was also the second ever NFL game played in Germany, the previous one being the Tampa Bay Buccaneers vs Seattle Seahawks game just a year prior.

==== Week 11: vs. Las Vegas Raiders ====
Week 11: Las Vegas Raiders at Miami Dolphins – Game summary

Quarter	1	2	3	4	Total
Raiders	10	3	0	0	**13**
**Dolphins**	7	7	6	0	**20**

at Hard Rock Stadium, Miami Gardens, Florida

- Date: November 19
- Game time: 1:00 p.m. EST
- Game weather: Partly cloudy, 82 °F (28 °C)
- Game attendance: 66,026
- Referee: Bill Vinovich
- TV announcers (CBS): Kevin Harlan, Trent Green and Melanie Collins
- Recap, Game Book

Game information

**First quarter**

- LV – Daniel Carlson 34-yard field goal, 6:41. Raiders 3–0. **Drive: 7 plays, 14 yards, 4:17.**
- MIA – Tyreek Hill 38-yard pass from Tua Tagovailoa (Jason Sanders kick), 2:03. Dolphins 7–3. **Drive: 8 plays, 75 yards, 4:38.**
- LV – Davante Adams 46-yard pass from Aidan O'Connell (Daniel Carlson kick), 0:01. Raiders 10–7. **Drive: 4 plays, 75 yards, 2:02.**

**Second quarter**

- MIA – Salvon Ahmed 11-yard pass from Tua Tagovailoa (Jason Sanders kick), 2:28. Dolphins 14–10. **Drive: 9 plays, 63 yards, 5:03.**
- LV – Daniel Carlson 47-yard field goal, 0:05. Dolphins 14–13. **Drive: 4 plays, 3 yards, 0:53.**

**Third quarter**

- MIA – Jason Sanders 41-yard field goal, 5:26. Dolphins 17–13. **Drive: 7 plays, 30 yards, 2:47.**
- MIA – Jason Sanders 51-yard field goal, 0:25. Dolphins 20–13. **Drive: 8 plays, 52 yards, 3:27.**

**Fourth quarter**

- No scoring plays.

**Top passers**

- LV – Aidan O'Connell – 24/41, 271 yards, TD, 3 INT
- MIA – Tua Tagovailoa – 28/39, 325 yards, 2 TD, INT

**Top rushers**

- LV – Josh Jacobs – 14 rushes, 39 yards
- MIA – Raheem Mostert – 22 rushes, 86 yards

**Top receivers**

- LV – Davante Adams – 7 receptions, 82 yards, TD
- MIA – Tyreek Hill – 10 receptions, 146 yards, TD

==== Week 12: at New York Jets ====
Black Friday games

Week 12: Miami Dolphins at New York Jets – Game summary

Quarter	1	2	3	4	Total
**Dolphins**	3	14	3	14	**34**
Jets	0	6	0	7	**13**

at MetLife Stadium, East Rutherford, New Jersey

- Date: November 24
- Game time: 3:00 p.m. EST
- Game weather: Partly sunny, 48 °F (9 °C)
- Game attendance: 82,973
- Referee: John Hussey
- TV announcers (WFOR/Prime Video): Al Michaels, Kirk Herbstreit and Kaylee Hartung
- Recap, Game Book

Game information

**First quarter**

- MIA – Jason Sanders 38-yard field goal, 1:26. Dolphins 3–0. **Drive: 7 plays, 36 yards, 3:31.**

**Second quarter**

- MIA – Tyreek Hill 7-yard pass from Tua Tagovailoa (Jason Sanders kick), 8:21. Dolphins 10–0. **Drive: 11 plays, 60 yards, 5:59.**
- NYJ – Brandin Echols 30-yard interception return (kick failed), 0:58. Dolphins 10–6.
- MIA – Jevon Holland 99-yard interception return (Jason Sanders kick), 0:00. Dolphins 17–6.

**Third quarter**

- MIA – Jason Sanders 54-yard field goal, 11:16. Dolphins 20–6. **Drive: 7 plays, 39 yards, 3:44.**

**Fourth quarter**

- MIA – Raheem Mostert 13-yard run (Jason Sanders kick), 14:55. Dolphins 27–6. **Drive: 15 plays, 92 yards, 9:03.**
- NYJ – Garrett Wilson 1-yard pass from Tim Boyle (Greg Zuerlein kick), 4:37. Dolphins 27–13. **Drive: 6 plays, 35 yards, 1:48.**
- MIA – Raheem Mostert 34-yard run (Jason Sanders kick), 3:35. Dolphins 34–13. **Drive: 4 plays, 46 yards, 1:02.**

**Top passers**

- MIA – Tua Tagovailoa – 21/30, 243 yards, TD, 2 INT
- NYJ – Tim Boyle – 27/38, 179 yards, TD, 2 INT

**Top rushers**

- MIA – Raheem Mostert – 20 rushes, 94 yards, 2 TD
- NYJ – Breece Hall – 7 rushes, 25 yards

**Top receivers**

- MIA – Tyreek Hill – 9 receptions, 102 yards, TD
- NYJ – Garrett Wilson – 7 receptions, 44 yards, TD

==== Week 13: at Washington Commanders ====
Week 13: Miami Dolphins at Washington Commanders – Game summary

Quarter	1	2	3	4	Total
**Dolphins**	17	14	7	7	**45**
Commanders	0	7	8	0	**15**

at FedExField, Landover, Maryland

- Date: December 3
- Game time: 1:00 p.m. EST
- Game weather: Cloudy, 53 °F (12 °C)
- Game attendance: 63,459
- Referee: Tra Blake
- TV announcers (Fox): Adam Amin, Mark Schlereth and Kristina Pink
- Recap, Game Book

Game information

**First quarter**

- MIA – Tyreek Hill 78-yard pass from Tua Tagovailoa (Jason Sanders kick), 9:28. Dolphins 7–0. **Drive: 3 plays, 86 yards, 1:28.**
- MIA – Jason Sanders 49-yard field goal, 3:39. Dolphins 10–0. **Drive: 8 plays, 39 yards, 4:15.**
- MIA – Andrew Van Ginkel 33-yard interception return (Jason Sanders kick), 0:55. Dolphins 17–0.

**Second quarter**

- WAS – Sam Howell 1-yard run (Joey Slye kick), 11:18. Dolphins 17–7. **Drive: 10 plays, 75 yards, 4:37.**
- MIA – Tyreek Hill 60-yard pass from Tua Tagovailoa (Jason Sanders kick), 9:14. Dolphins 24–7. **Drive: 5 plays, 75 yards, 2:04.**
- MIA – Raheem Mostert 1-yard run (Jason Sanders kick), 0:20. Dolphins 31–7. **Drive: 11 plays, 76 yards, 5:35.**

**Third quarter**

- MIA – De'Von Achane 4-yard run (Jason Sanders kick), 9:36. Dolphins 38–7. **Drive: 9 plays, 75 yards, 5:24.**
- WAS – Sam Howell 13-yard run (Sam Howell-Logan Thomas pass), 4:31. Dolphins 38–15. **Drive: 9 plays, 75 yards, 5:05.**

**Fourth quarter**

- MIA – De'Von Achane 2-yard run (Jason Sanders kick), 1:57. Dolphins 45–15. **Drive: 13 plays, 59 yards, 7:50.**

**Top passers**

- MIA – Tua Tagovailoa – 18/24, 280 yards, 2 TD
- WAS – Sam Howell – 12/23, 127 yards, INT

**Top rushers**

- MIA – De'Von Achane – 17 rushes, 73 yards, 2 TD
- WAS – Brian Robinson Jr. – 7 rushes, 53 yards

**Top receivers**

- MIA – Tyreek Hill – 5 receptions, 157 yards, 2 TD
- WAS – Curtis Samuel – 4 receptions, 65 yards

==== Week 14: vs. Tennessee Titans ====
Week 14: Tennessee Titans at Miami Dolphins – Game summary

Quarter	1	2	3	4	Total
**Titans**	0	10	3	15	**28**
Dolphins	7	0	3	17	**27**

at Hard Rock Stadium, Miami Gardens, Florida

- Date: December 11
- Game time: 8:15 p.m. EST
- Game weather: Partly cloudy, 64 °F (18 °C)
- Game attendance: 66,068
- Referee: Adrian Hill
- TV announcers (WSFL/ESPN): Chris Fowler, Louis Riddick, Dan Orlovsky and Laura Rutledge
- Recap, Game Book

Game information

**First quarter**

- MIA – Zach Sieler 5-yard interception return (Jason Sanders kick), 8:25. Dolphins 7–0.

**Second quarter**

- TEN – Derrick Henry 1-yard run (Nick Folk kick), 6:53. Tied 7–7. **Drive: 14 plays, 86 yards, 7:13.**
- TEN – Nick Folk 28-yard field goal, 0:00. Titans 10–7. **Drive: 6 plays, 69 yards, 0:28.**

**Third quarter**

- MIA – Jason Sanders 20-yard field goal, 9:35. Tied 10–10. **Drive: 11 plays, 77 yards, 5:25.**
- TEN – Nick Folk 23-yard field goal, 0:09. Titans 13–10. **Drive: 12 plays, 60 yards, 5:44.**

**Fourth quarter**

- MIA – Jason Sanders 31-yard field goal, 12:37. Tied 13–13. **Drive: 7 plays, 59 yards, 2:32.**
- MIA – Raheem Mostert 3-yard run (Jason Sanders kick), 5:34. Dolphins 20–13. **Drive: 2 plays, 7 yards, 0:33.**
- MIA – Raheem Mostert 5-yard run (Jason Sanders kick), 4:34. Dolphins 27–13. **Drive: 2 plays, 12 yards, 0:54.**
- TEN – DeAndre Hopkins 3-yard pass from Will Levis (Will Levis–Nick Westbrook-Ikhine pass), 2:40. Dolphins 27–21. **Drive: 9 plays, 75 yards, 1:54.**
- TEN – Derrick Henry 3-yard run (Nick Folk kick), 1:49. Titans 28–27. **Drive: 4 plays, 64 yards, 0:26.**

**Top passers**

- TEN – Will Levis – 23/38, 327 yards, TD, INT
- MIA – Tua Tagovailoa – 23/33, 240 yards

**Top rushers**

- TEN – Derrick Henry – 17 rushes, 34 yards, 2 TD
- MIA – Raheem Mostert – 21 rushes, 96 yards, TD

**Top receivers**

- TEN – DeAndre Hopkins – 7 receptions, 124 yards, TD
- MIA – Jaylen Waddle – 6 receptions, 79 yards

With 4:34 to go in the game, the Dolphins had a 27–13 lead and a 99.7% chance of winning the game by one measure. The Titans drove the ball 75 yards in the span of less than two minutes to narrow the lead to six after a successful two-point conversion. Miami had the ball back with 2:40 to go but had three middling run plays result in them having to punt the ball to Tennessee with 2:15 to go because the Titans managed to call two of their timeouts. The Titans drove 64 yards in four plays that resulted in a Derrick Henry touchdown to give them the lead with 1:45 to go. The Dolphins started at their own 26-yard line with the ball but moved just 19 yards before turning it over on downs. With the loss, the Dolphins became the first team to blow a lead of at least 14 points in the final three minutes in regulation.

==== Week 15: vs. New York Jets ====
Week 15: New York Jets at Miami Dolphins – Game summary

Quarter	1	2	3	4	Total
Jets	0	0	0	0	**0**
**Dolphins**	7	17	3	3	**30**

at Hard Rock Stadium, Miami Gardens, Florida

- Date: December 17
- Game time: 1:00 p.m. EST
- Game weather: Partly cloudy, 76 °F (24 °C)
- Game attendance: 65,967
- Referee: Brad Rogers
- TV announcers (CBS): Jim Nantz, Tony Romo and Tracy Wolfson
- Recap, Game Book

Game information

**First quarter**

- MIA – Raheem Mostert 2-yard run (Jason Sanders kick), 7:37. Dolphins 7–0. **Drive: 3 plays, 1 yard, 1:28.**

**Second quarter**

- MIA – Jason Sanders 37-yard field goal, 13:56. Dolphins 10–0. **Drive: 9 plays, 22 yards, 6:27.**
- MIA – Jaylen Waddle 60-yard pass from Tua Tagovailoa (Jason Sanders kick), 7:42. Dolphins 17–0. **Drive: 1 play, 60 yards, 0:09.**
- MIA – Raheem Mostert 1-yard run (Jason Sanders kick), 1:03. Dolphins 24–0. **Drive: 11 plays, 80 yards, 4:24.**

**Third quarter**

- MIA – Jason Sanders 27-yard field goal, 8:36. Dolphins 27–0. **Drive: 9 plays, 41 yards, 5:21.**

**Fourth quarter**

- MIA – Jason Sanders 35-yard field goal, 11:42. Dolphins 30–0. **Drive: 12 plays, 42 yards, 7:43.**

**Top passers**

- NYJ – Trevor Siemian – 14/36, 110 yards, 2 INT
- MIA – Tua Tagovailoa – 21/24, 224 yards, TD

**Top rushers**

- NYJ – Breece Hall – 6 rushes, 12 yards
- MIA – Raheem Mostert – 15 rushes, 42 yards, 2 TD

**Top receivers**

- NYJ – Tyler Conklin – 4 receptions, 18 yards
- MIA – Jaylen Waddle – 8 receptions, 142 yards, TD

==== Week 16: vs. Dallas Cowboys ====
Week 16: Dallas Cowboys at Miami Dolphins – Game summary

Quarter	1	2	3	4	Total
Cowboys	7	0	3	10	**20**
**Dolphins**	3	10	6	3	**22**

at Hard Rock Stadium, Miami Gardens, Florida

- Date: December 24
- Game time: 4:25 p.m. EST
- Game weather: Cloudy, 75 °F (24 °C)
- Game attendance: 66,410
- Referee: Shawn Hochuli
- TV announcers (Fox): Kevin Burkhardt, Greg Olsen, Erin Andrews and Tom Rinaldi
- Recap, Game Book

Game information

**First quarter**

- MIA – Jason Sanders 57-yard field goal, 2:50. Dolphins 3–0. **Drive: 10 plays, 59 yards, 4:27.**
- DAL – CeeDee Lamb 49-yard pass from Dak Prescott (Brandon Aubrey kick), 1:30. Cowboys 7–3. **Drive: 3 plays, 75 yards, 1:20.**

**Second quarter**

- MIA – Jason Sanders 52-yard field goal, 4:31. Cowboys 7–6. **Drive: 6 plays, 31 yards, 2:50.**
- MIA – Raheem Mostert 4-yard pass from Tua Tagovailoa (Jason Sanders kick), 0:17. Dolphins 13–7. **Drive: 8 plays, 71 yards, 2:06.**

**Third quarter**

- MIA – Jason Sanders 54-yard field goal, 8:59. Dolphins 16–7. **Drive: 5 plays, 24 yards, 2:54.**
- DAL – Brandon Aubrey 43-yard field goal, 5:28. Dolphins 16–10. **Drive: 6 plays, 50 yards, 3:31.**
- MIA – Jason Sanders 35-yard field goal, 1:24. Dolphins 19–10. **Drive: 9 plays, 58 yards, 4:04.**

**Fourth quarter**

- DAL – Brandon Aubrey 33-yard field goal, 12:31. Dolphins 19–13. **Drive: 10 plays, 60 yards, 3:53.**
- DAL – Brandin Cooks 8-yard pass from Dak Prescott (Brandon Aubrey kick), 3:27. Cowboys 20–19. **Drive: 17 plays, 69 yards, 7:39.**
- MIA – Jason Sanders 29-yard field goal, 0:00. Dolphins 22–20. **Drive: 12 plays, 64 yards, 3:27.**

**Top passers**

- DAL – Dak Prescott – 20/32, 253 yards, 2 TD
- MIA – Tua Tagovailoa – 24/37, 293 yards, TD

**Top rushers**

- DAL – Tony Pollard – 12 rushes, 38 yards
- MIA – Raheem Mostert – 11 rushes, 46 yards

**Top receivers**

- DAL – CeeDee Lamb – 6 receptions, 118 yards, TD
- MIA – Tyreek Hill – 9 receptions, 99 yards

==== Week 17: at Baltimore Ravens ====
Week 17: Miami Dolphins at Baltimore Ravens – Game summary

Quarter	1	2	3	4	Total
Dolphins	10	3	0	6	**19**
**Ravens**	7	21	7	21	**56**

at M&T Bank Stadium, Baltimore, Maryland

- Date: December 31
- Game time: 1:00 p.m. EST
- Game weather: Clear, 50 °F (10 °C)
- Game attendance: 71,196
- Referee: Clete Blakeman
- TV announcers (CBS): Ian Eagle, Charles Davis and Evan Washburn
- Recap, Game Book

Game information

**First quarter**

- MIA – Cedrick Wilson Jr. 8-yard pass from Tua Tagovailoa (Jason Sanders kick), 11:00. Dolphins 7–0. **Drive: 8 plays, 75 yards, 4:00.**
- BAL – Justice Hill 20-yard pass from Lamar Jackson (Justin Tucker kick), 6:39. Tied 7–7. **Drive: 7 plays, 75 yards, 4:21.**
- MIA – Jason Sanders 27-yard field goal, 3:39. Dolphins 10–7. **Drive: 6 plays, 65 yards, 3:00.**

**Second quarter**

- BAL – Gus Edwards 1-yard run (Justin Tucker kick), 6:56. Ravens 14–10. **Drive: 10 plays, 89 yards, 5:50.**
- MIA – Jason Sanders 38-yard field goal, 3:10. Ravens 14–13. **Drive: 11 plays, 49 yards, 3:46.**
- BAL – Zay Flowers 75-yard pass from Lamar Jackson (Justin Tucker kick), 2:58. Ravens 21–13. **Drive: 1 play, 75 yards, 0:12.**
- BAL – Isaiah Likely 35-yard pass from Lamar Jackson (Justin Tucker kick), 1:24. Ravens 28–13. **Drive: 4 plays, 38 yards, 0:26.**

**Third quarter**

- BAL – Isaiah Likely 7-yard pass from Lamar Jackson (Justin Tucker kick), 13:29. Ravens 35–13. **Drive: 3 plays, 18 yards, 1:31.**

**Fourth quarter**

- MIA – De'Von Achane 1-yard pass from Tua Tagovailoa (pass failed), 13:57. Ravens 35–19. **Drive: 14 plays, 78 yards, 6:42.**
- BAL – Patrick Ricard 4-yard pass from Lamar Jackson (Justin Tucker kick), 9:38. Ravens 42–19. **Drive: 7 plays, 75 yards, 4:19.**
- BAL – Melvin Gordon 7-yard run (Justin Tucker kick), 4:11. Ravens 49–19. **Drive: 6 plays, 32 yards, 3:44.**
- BAL – Charlie Kolar 19-yard pass from Tyler Huntley (Justin Tucker kick), 2:28. Ravens 56–19. **Drive: 3 plays, 8 yards, 1:35.**

**Top passers**

- MIA – Tua Tagovailoa – 22/38, 237 yards, 2 TD, 2 INT
- BAL – Lamar Jackson – 18/21, 321 yards, 5 TD

**Top rushers**

- MIA – De'Von Achane – 14 rushes, 107 yards
- BAL – Gus Edwards – 16 rush, 68 yards, TD

**Top receivers**

- MIA – Tyreek Hill – 6 receptions, 76 yards
- BAL – Zay Flowers – 3 receptions, 106 yards, TD

==== Week 18: vs. Buffalo Bills ====
Week 18: Buffalo Bills at Miami Dolphins – Game summary

Quarter	1	2	3	4	Total
**Bills**	0	7	0	14	**21**
Dolphins	0	14	0	0	**14**

at Hard Rock Stadium, Miami Gardens, Florida

- Date: January 7
- Game time: 8:20 p.m. EST
- Game weather: Partly cloudy, 63 °F (17 °C)
- Game attendance: 66,292
- Referee: Alex Kemp
- TV announcers (NBC): Mike Tirico, Cris Collinsworth and Melissa Stark
- Recap, Game Book

Game information

**First quarter**

- No scoring plays.

**Second quarter**

- MIA – De'Von Achane 25-yard run (Jason Sanders kick), 8:51. Dolphins 7–0. **Drive: 11 plays, 80 yards, 6:19.**
- BUF – Trent Sherfield 6-yard pass from Josh Allen (Tyler Bass kick), 4:31. Tied 7–7. **Drive: 7 plays, 75 yards, 4:20.**
- MIA – Tyreek Hill 3-yard pass from Tua Tagovailoa (Jason Sanders kick), 1:43. Dolphins 14–7. **Drive: 9 plays, 75 yards, 2:48.**

**Third quarter**

- No scoring plays.

**Fourth quarter**

- BUF – Deonte Harty 96-yard punt return (Tyler Bass kick), 13:42. Tied 14–14.
- BUF – Dawson Knox 5-yard pass from Josh Allen (Tyler Bass kick), 7:16. Bills 21–14. **Drive: 8 plays, 74 yards, 4:52.**

**Top passers**

- BUF – Josh Allen – 30/38, 359 yards, 2 TD, 2 INT
- MIA – Tua Tagovailoa – 17/27, 173 yards, TD, 2 INT

**Top rushers**

- BUF – Josh Allen – 15 rushes, 67 yards
- MIA – De'Von Achane – 10 rushes, 56 yards, TD

**Top receivers**

- BUF – Khalil Shakir – 6 receptions, 105 yards
- MIA – Tyreek Hill – 7 receptions, 82 yards, TD

=== Standings ===
==== Division ====
AFC East
	W	L	T	PCT	DIV	CONF	PF	PA	STK
^{(2)} Buffalo Bills	11	6	0	.647	4–2	7–5	451	311	W5
^{(6)} Miami Dolphins	11	6	0	.647	4–2	7–5	496	391	L2
New York Jets	7	10	0	.412	2–4	4–8	268	355	W1
New England Patriots	4	13	0	.235	2–4	4–8	236	366	L2

==== Conference ====
AFC
#	Team	Division	W	L	T	PCT	DIV	CONF	SOS	SOV	STK
**Division leaders**
1	Baltimore Ravens	North	13	4	0	.765	3–3	8–4	.543	.529	L1
2 (Note: Buffalo claimed the No. 2 seed over Kansas City based on head-to-head victory.) (Note: Buffalo finished ahead of Miami in the AFC East based on head-to-head sweep.)	Buffalo Bills	East	11	6	0	.647	4–2	7–5	.471	.471	W5
3	Kansas City Chiefs	West	11	6	0	.647	4–2	9–3	.481	.428	W2
4	Houston Texans	South	10	7	0	.588	4–2	7–5	.474	.465	W2
**Wild cards**
5 (Note: Cleveland claimed the No. 5 seed over Miami based on conference record.)	Cleveland Browns	North	11	6	0	.647	3–3	8–4	.536	.513	L1
6	Miami Dolphins	East	11	6	0	.647	4–2	7–5	.450	.358	L2
7	Pittsburgh Steelers	North	10	7	0	.588	5–1	7–5	.540	.571	W3
**Did not qualify for the postseason**
8 (Note: Cincinnati finished ahead of Jacksonville based on head-to-head victory. Division tie break was initially used to eliminate Indianapolis (see below).)	Cincinnati Bengals	North	9	8	0	.529	1–5	4–8	.574	.536	W1
9 (Note: Jacksonville finished ahead of Indianapolis based on head-to-head sweep.)	Jacksonville Jaguars	South	9	8	0	.529	4–2	6–6	.533	.477	L1
10	Indianapolis Colts	South	9	8	0	.529	3–3	7–5	.491	.444	L1
11 (Note: Las Vegas finished ahead of Denver based on head-to-head sweep.)	Las Vegas Raiders	West	8	9	0	.471	4–2	6–6	.488	.426	W1
12	Denver Broncos	West	8	9	0	.471	3–3	5–7	.488	.485	L1
13	New York Jets	East	7	10	0	.412	2–4	4–8	.502	.454	W1
14	Tennessee Titans	South	6	11	0	.353	1–5	4–8	.522	.422	W1
15	Los Angeles Chargers	West	5	12	0	.294	1–5	3–9	.529	.388	L5
16	New England Patriots	East	4	13	0	.235	2–4	4–8	.522	.529	L2
**Tiebreakers** (Note: When breaking ties for three or more teams under the NFL's rules, they are first broken within divisions, then comparing only the highest ranked remaining team from each division.)

== Postseason ==
=== Schedule ===
Round	Date	Opponent (seed)	Result	Record	Venue	Recap
Wild Card	January 13	at Kansas City Chiefs (3)	L 7–26	0–1	Arrowhead Stadium	Recap

=== Game summaries ===
==== AFC Wild Card Playoffs: at (3) Kansas City Chiefs ====
AFC Wild Card Playoffs: (6) Miami Dolphins at (3) Kansas City Chiefs – Game summary

Quarter	1	2	3	4	Total
Dolphins	0	7	0	0	7
Chiefs	7	9	3	7	26

at Arrowhead Stadium, Kansas City, Missouri

- Date: January 13, 2024
- Game time: 8:15 p.m. EST/7:15 p.m. CST
- Game weather: −4 °F (−20 °C)
- Game attendance: 71,492
- Referee: Brad Rogers
- TV announcers (WTVJ): Mike Tirico, Jason Garrett and Kaylee Hartung
- Recap, Game Book

Game information

First quarter

- KC – Rashee Rice 11-yard pass from Patrick Mahomes (Harrison Butker kick), 11:05. Chiefs 7–0. Drive: 9 plays, 69 yards, 3:55.

Second quarter

- KC – Harrison Butker 28-yard field goal, 14:52. Chiefs 10–0. Drive: 10 plays, 48 yards, 3:12.
- MIA – Tyreek Hill 53-yard pass from Tua Tagovailoa (Jason Sanders kick), 14:01. Chiefs 10–7. Drive: 2 plays, 62 yards, 0:50.
- KC – Harrison Butker 26-yard field goal, 7:36. Chiefs 13–7. Drive: 12 plays, 72 yards, 6:25.
- KC – Harrison Butker 32-yard field goal, 0:18. Chiefs 16–7. Drive: 7 plays, 47 yards, 1:25.

Third quarter

- KC – Harrison Butker 21-yard field goal, 7:49. Chiefs 19–7. Drive: 13 plays, 69 yards, 5:32.

Fourth quarter

- KC – Isiah Pacheco 3-yard run (Harrison Butker kick), 11:06. Chiefs 26–7. Drive: 14 plays, 72 yards, 7:01.

Top passers

- MIA – Tua Tagovailoa – 20/39, 199 yards, TD, INT
- KC – Patrick Mahomes – 23/41, 262 yards, TD

Top rushers

- MIA – Raheem Mostert – 8 rushes, 33 yards
- KC – Isiah Pacheco – 24 rushes, 89 yards, TD

Top receivers

- MIA – Tyreek Hill – 5 receptions, 62 yards, TD
- KC – Rashee Rice – 8 receptions, 130 yards, TD

This game drew an average of 23 million viewers, making it the most live-streamed event in the United States. As the first-ever exclusive streaming NFL playoff game, it accounted for 30% of total internet traffic during the broadcast.
