= Jaylen Waddle =

American football player (born 1998)

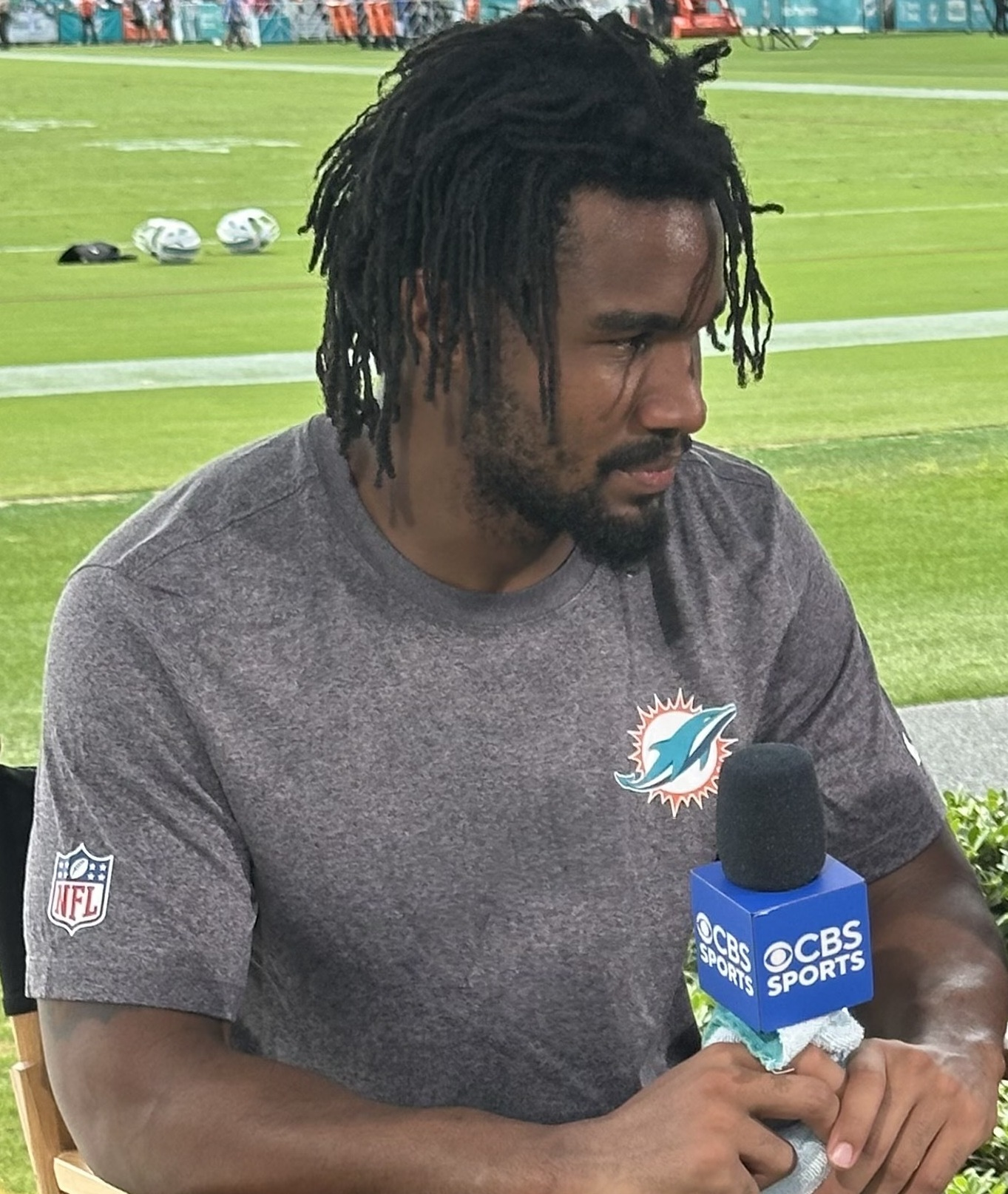
- Waddle with the Miami Dolphins in 2025

No. 17 – Denver Broncos
- Position: Wide receiver
- Roster status: Active

Personal information
- Born: November 25, 1998 (age 27); Houston, Texas, U.S.
- Listed height: 5 ft 10 in (1.78 m)
- Listed weight: 185 lb (84 kg)

Career information
- High school: Episcopal (Bellaire, Texas)
- College: Alabama (2018–2020)
- NFL draft: 2021: 1st round, 6th overall pick

Career history
- Miami Dolphins (2021–2025); Denver Broncos (2026–present)

Awards and highlights
- PFWA All-Rookie Team (2021); CFP national champion (2020); NCAA punt return yards leader (2019); NCAA average punt return yards leader (2019); SEC Special Teams Player of the Year (2019); SEC Freshman of the Year (2018); First-team All-SEC (2019); Second-team All-SEC (2020)

Career NFL statistics as of Week 9, 2026
- Receptions: 403
- Receiving yards: 5,376
- Receiving touchdowns: 28
- Stats at Pro Football Reference

Jaylen Waddle (born November 25, 1998) is an American professional football wide receiver for the Denver Broncos of the National Football League (NFL). He played college football for the Alabama Crimson Tide and was selected sixth overall by the Miami Dolphins in the 2021 NFL draft. He played the first five seasons of his career with the Dolphins until his trade to the Broncos in 2026.

== Early life ==
Waddle attended Episcopal High School in Bellaire, Texas. During his time with the Knights, Waddle appeared in three Southwest Preparatory Conference championship games, winning one as a sophomore in 2014. As a senior, he played in the U.S. Army All-American Game. He committed to the University of Alabama to play college football. He made the selection on National Signing Day of 2018 and chose the Crimson Tide over Texas, Texas A&M, Florida State, TCU, and Oregon.

== College career ==
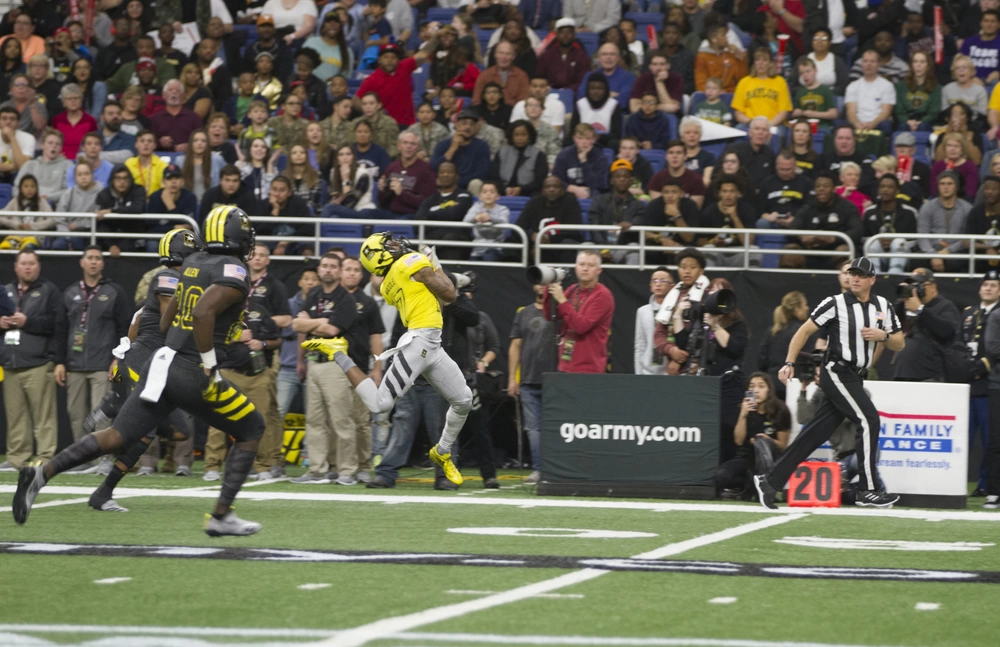
Waddle catching a pass during the Army All-American Bowl.

On September 29, 2018, against Louisiana, Waddle had three receptions for 138 yards and two receiving touchdowns to go with a 63-yard punt return for a touchdown. In the SEC Championship against Georgia, he had four receptions for 113 yards and a touchdown in the win. As a true freshman at Alabama in 2018, Waddle was named the SEC Freshman of the Year after recording 45 receptions for 848 yards and seven touchdowns. As a punt returner, he also returned 16 punts for 233 yards and a touchdown.

Waddle returned to the Crimson Tide for his sophomore season in 2019. He recorded 33 receptions for 560 yards and scored six receiving touchdowns. He also returned a punt 77 yards for a touchdown against LSU and a kickoff 98 yards for a touchdown against Auburn. He was named first-team All-SEC as a return specialist and was named SEC Special Teams Player of the Year. He led the NCAA in both punt return yards (487) and average punt return yards (24.4).

In his first four games of the COVID-19 pandemic-shortened 2020 season, Waddle recorded at least 120 receiving yards in each of the games. He had eight receptions for 134 yards and two touchdowns in the win over Missouri on September 26. In the following game, a win over Texas A&M, he had five receptions for 142 yards and one touchdown. In the next game, a win over Ole Miss, he had six receptions for 120 yards. In the next game, against Georgia, he had six receptions for 161 yards and a touchdown in the win. On October 24, Waddle broke his right ankle when he was tackled while returning the opening kickoff in a game against Tennessee. Waddle returned for the National Championship game against Ohio State. On January 14, 2021, Waddle announced that he would forgo his senior season and enter the 2021 NFL draft.

== Professional career ==
Pre-draft measurables
Height	Weight	Arm length	Hand span	Wingspan	40-yard dash
5 ft 9 1/2 in (1.77 m)	180 lb (82 kg)	30 3/8 in (0.77 m)	9 1/8 in (0.23 m)	6 ft 2 5/8 in (1.90 m)	4.37 s
All values from Pro Day

=== Miami Dolphins ===
Waddle was selected sixth overall in the 2021 NFL draft by the Miami Dolphins, reuniting him with his college quarterback Tua Tagovailoa. On May 14, 2021, Waddle signed with the Dolphins on a $27.1 million deal.

==== 2021 ====
In his first NFL game on September 12, 2021, Waddle faced off against former Alabama teammate quarterback Mac Jones and the New England Patriots. Waddle caught 4 of his 6 targets for 61 receiving yards, and also caught his first NFL receiving touchdown on a 3-yard pass from Tua Tagovailoa in the 17–16 win. His first big breakthrough came in Week 12 against the Carolina Panthers, finishing with 137 receiving yards as the Dolphins won 33–10. Throughout the season, Waddle became known for his waddling celebrations after touchdowns, inspired by his last name.

In his 16th game of the season, Waddle set the NFL rookie record for receptions in a season with 104, surpassing Anquan Boldin's then-record of 101. In 2023, this record was broken by Puka Nacua (105). Waddle finished his rookie season with 104 receptions for 1,015 yards and seven total touchdowns. He was named to the PFWA All-Rookie Team.

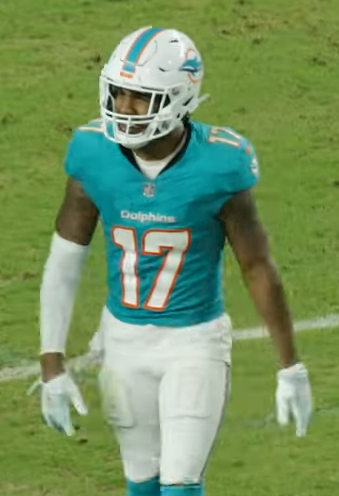
Waddle in 2024

==== 2022 ====
In a Week 2 game against the Baltimore Ravens, Waddle had a career high of 11 receptions, 171 yards, and 2 touchdowns including the game winner to help the Dolphins comeback from a 35–14 4th quarter deficit, eventually winning the game 42–38. In Week 8 against the Lions, he had eight receptions for 106 yards and two touchdowns in the win.

In a Week 16 game against the Green Bay Packers, he had an 84-yard receiving touchdown, setting the record for longest play during an NFL Christmas game.

Waddle finished the season with 75 receptions for 1,356 receiving yards and eight touchdowns. The latter two figures set career-highs. He also finished the season with 18.1 yards per catch, which led the league.

==== 2023 ====
In a Week 2 game against the Patriots, Waddle went down and was ruled out of the game. He was later reported to be in concussion protocol. Before a Week 3 game against the Denver Broncos, Waddle was ruled out with a concussion. He had seven catches for 121 yards and a touchdown against the Patriots in Week 8. he had eight receptions for 142 yards and a touchdown against the Jets in Week 15. He finished the season with 72 catches for 1,014 yards and four touchdowns in 14 games.

==== 2024 ====
On April 29, 2024, the Dolphins picked up the fifth-year option on Waddle's contract. On May 30, Waddle and the Dolphins agreed to a three–year, $84.75 million contract extension. In Week 12, he had eight receptions for 144 yards and a touchdown in a 34–15 win over the Patriots. Waddle finished the season with 58 receptions for 744 yards and two touchdowns.

==== 2025 ====
Waddle became the lead receiver after Tyreek Hill's injury after Week 4. In Week 5 against the Carolina Panthers, he had six receptions for 110 yards and a touchdown in a 24–27 loss. Waddle finished the 2025 season with 64 receptions for 910 yards and six touchdowns.

=== Denver Broncos ===
On March 18, 2026, the Dolphins traded Waddle along with a 2026 fourth-round pick (111th overall, Kage Casey) to the Denver Broncos in exchange for their 2026 first (30th overall, which the Jets used to select Omar Cooper), third (94th overall, Chris Bell), and fourth-round (130th overall, Trey Moore) picks. On March 24, the Broncos restructured Waddle's contract to free up cap space.

During the Broncos' season opener against the Kansas City Chiefs, Waddle recorded only one reception for two yards. He bounced back in Week 2 against the Jacksonville Jaguars, catching eight passes for 138 yards.

== Career statistics ==
=== NFL ===
Legend
	Led the league
**Bold**	Career high

==== Regular season ====
Year	Team	Games		Receiving					Rushing					Fumbles	
Year	Team	GP	GS	Rec	Yds	Avg	Lng	TD	Att	Yds	Avg	Lng	TD	Fum	Lost
2021	MIA	16	16	**104**	1,015	9.8	57	6	2	3	1.5	2	**1**	**2**	**1**
2022	MIA	17	17	75	**1,356**	**18.1**	**84**	**8**	3	26	8.7	9	0	1	**1**
2023	MIA	14	14	72	1,014	14.1	60	4	3	12	4.0	**12**	0	0	0
2024	MIA	15	15	58	744	12.8	63	2	**4**	12	3.0	6	0	0	0
2025	MIA	16	16	64	910	14.2	46	6	2	**28**	**14.0**	**21**	0	1	0
2026	DEN	9	8	30	337	11.2	49	2	2	23	11.5	14	0	0	0
Career		87	86	403	5,376	13.3	84	27	16	104	6.5	21	1	4	2

==== Postseason ====
Year	Team	Games		Receiving					Rushing					Fumbles	
Year	Team	GP	GS	Rec	Yds	Avg	Lng	TD	Att	Yds	Avg	Lng	TD	Fum	Lost
2022	MIA	1	1	**3**	**44**	14.7	**25**	0	**1**	8	8.0	8	0	0	0
2023	MIA	1	1	2	31	**15.5**	17	0	**1**	**9**	**9.0**	**9**	0	0	0
Career		2	2	5	75	15.0	25	0	2	17	8.5	9	0	0	0

=== College ===
Legend
	Led the NCAA
**Bold**	Career high

Season	Receiving					Punt returns			
Season	Rec	Yds	Avg	Lng	TD	Ret	Yds	Avg	TD
2018	**45**	**848**	18.8	**94**	**7**	16	233	14.6	**1**
2019	33	560	17.0	58	6	**20**	**487**	**24.4**	**1**
2020	28	591	**21.1**	90	4	2	13	6.5	0
Career	106	1,999	18.9	94	17	38	733	19.3	2
