= Taron Johnson =

American football player (born 1996)

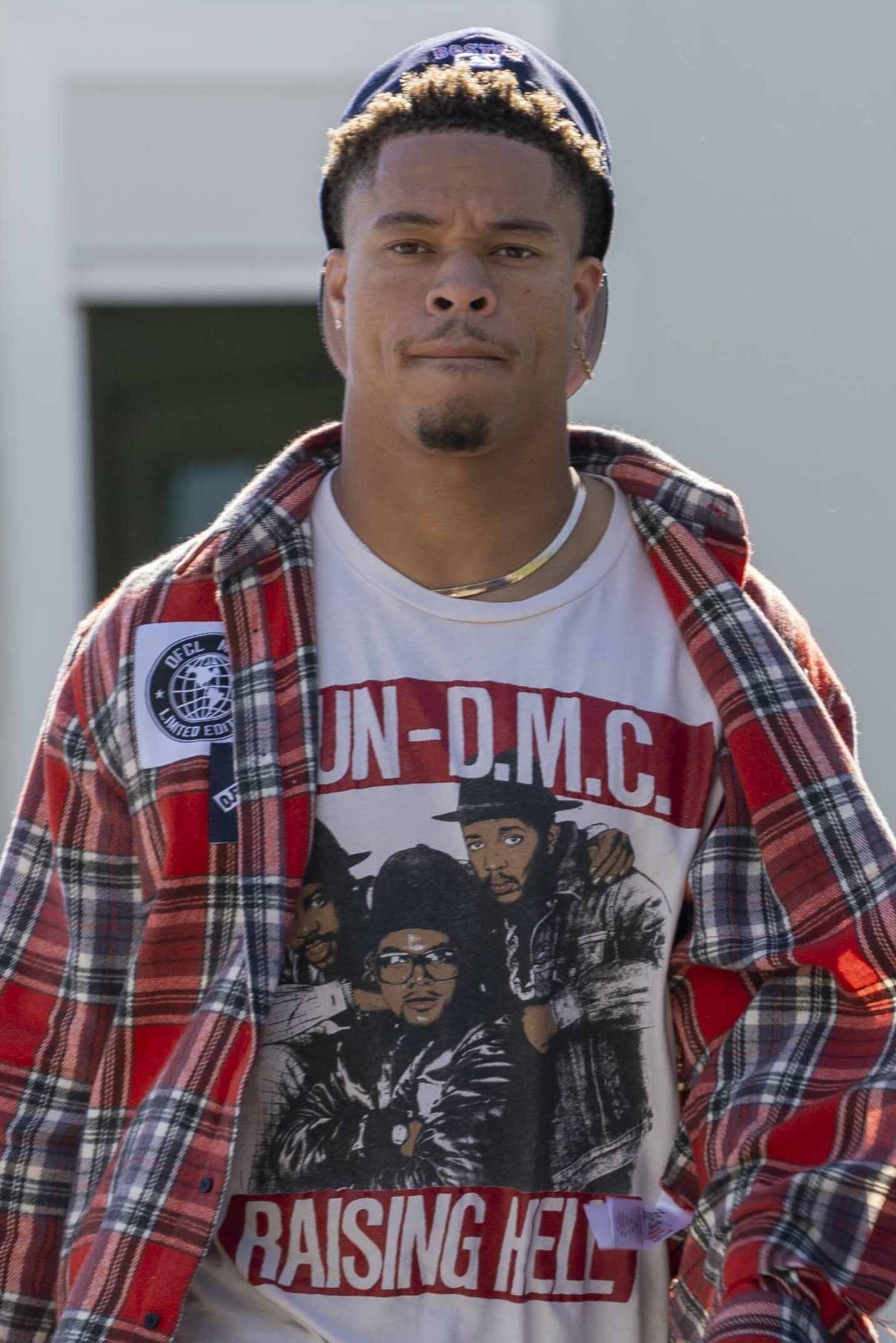
- Johnson in 2021

No. 3 – Las Vegas Raiders
- Position: Cornerback
- Roster status: Active

Personal information
- Born: July 27, 1996 (age 30); Sacramento, California, U.S.
- Listed height: 5 ft 11 in (1.80 m)
- Listed weight: 192 lb (87 kg)

Career information
- High school: Sheldon (Sacramento)
- College: Weber State (2014–2017)
- NFL draft: 2018: 4th round, 121st overall pick

Career history
- Buffalo Bills (2018–2025); Las Vegas Raiders (2026–present)

Awards and highlights
- Second-team All-Pro (2023); Big Sky Defensive Player of the Year (2017); First-team All-Big Sky (2017); Second-team All-Big Sky (2016); First-team FCS All-American (2017)

Career NFL statistics as of Week 10, 2026
- Total tackles: 606
- Sacks: 8.5
- Forced fumbles: 9
- Fumble recoveries: 4
- Pass deflections: 50
- Interceptions: 6
- Defensive touchdowns: 3
- Stats at Pro Football Reference

Taron Johnson (born July 27, 1996) is an American professional football cornerback for the Las Vegas Raiders of the National Football League (NFL). He played college football for the Weber State Wildcats and was selected by the Buffalo Bills in the 4th round of the 2018 NFL draft. Johnson was named a second team All-Pro in 2023, namely for his play as a slot cornerback.

== Early life ==
Johnson played high school football at Sheldon High School in Sacramento, California. He was pulled up to the school’s varsity squad as a sophomore, one year earlier than the standard, owing to his exceptional talent. He would go on to be the school’s first ever NFL draft pick.

== College career ==
Coming out of high school, Weber State was the only college that offered Johnson a football position, so he accepted it.

Johnson started five games as a freshman at Weber State, and was a full-time starter thereafter. As a sophomore, he set a school record with 12 pass break-ups, and then tied the record the following season as a junior. As a senior in 2017, he totaled three interceptions, nine pass break-ups, and 49 tackles, earning the Big Sky Defensive Player of the Year award and consensus First Time All-American honors.

== Professional career ==
=== Pre-draft ===
He participated in the 2018 Senior Bowl and reportedly impressed scouts and team representatives at practices during the week of the Senior Bowl. During the NFL Scouting Combine, Johnson performed all of the combined and positional drills. NFL.com lead analyst Lance Zierlein projected Johnson would be drafted in either the fifth or sixth round.

Pre-draft measurables
Height	Weight	Arm length	Hand span	Wingspan	40-yard dash	10-yard split	20-yard split	20-yard shuttle	Three-cone drill	Vertical jump	Broad jump	Bench press
5 ft 11 1/8 in (1.81 m)	192 lb (87 kg)	30 7/8 in (0.78 m)	9 1/8 in (0.23 m)	6 ft 2 in (1.88 m)	4.50 s	1.53 s	2.60 s	4.27 s	6.86 s	33.0 in (0.84 m)	9 ft 10 in (3.00 m)	17 reps
All values from NFL Combine/Pro Day

=== Buffalo Bills ===
==== 2018 ====
The Buffalo Bills selected Johnson in the fourth round (121st overall) of the 2018 NFL draft. He was the 14th cornerback drafted in 2018. Johnson became the Bills' starting nickel cornerback, as head coach Sean McDermott has utilized a base nickel defense. His success as a run defender and in coverage allowed the McDermott-era Bills to become one of the first teams to fully commit to the philosophy.

On May 11, 2018, the Buffalo Bills signed Johnson to a four–year, $3.10 million rookie contract that included a signing bonus of $646,068.

Throughout training camp, he competed for the job at starting nickelback against Phillip Gaines, Lafayette Pitts, and Breon Borders under defensive coordinator Leslie Frazier. Head coach Sean McDermott named Johnson the starting nickelback to begin the season and listed him as the fourth cornerback on the depth chart, behind Tre'Davious White, Vontae Davis, and Phillip Gaines.

On September 9, 2018, Johnson made his professional regular season debut during the Buffalo Bills' season-opener at the Baltimore Ravens and made two solo tackles as they lost 3–47. He injured his shoulder during the game and was subsequently inactive as the Bills lost 20–31 against the Los Angeles Chargers in Week 2. In Week 2, Vontae Davis announced his sudden retirement. Phillip Gaines would suffer an elbow injury and would be inactive for two games (Weeks 3–4). In Week 4, Johnson earned his first career start and made five combined tackles (four solo) and had a forced fumble and his first career sack on Aaron Rodgers for a six-yard loss during a 0–22 loss at the Green Bay Packers. On October 7, 2018, he made four solo tackles, a pass deflection, and had his first career interception on a pass by Marcus Mariota to wide receiver Nick Williams during a 12–13 victory against the Tennessee Titans. In Week 7, he collected a season-high seven solo tackles as the Bills were routed 5–37 at the Indianapolis Colts. On December 11, 2018, the Bills officially placed him on injured reserve and he was inactive for the remaining four games (Weeks 14–17) due to a shoulder injury that requires surgery that was plaguing him the entire season. He finished his rookie season during the 2018 NFL season with a total of 42 combined tackles (38 solo), three pass deflections, one sack, a forced fumble, and one interception in 11 games and two starts. At the conclusion of his rookie season, he received an overall grade of 69.6 from Pro Football Focus, which ranked 45th amongst all qualifying cornerbacks in 2018.

==== 2019 ====
Throughout training camp, Johnson competed against Kevin Johnson to be the starting nickelback. Head coach Sean McDermott named him the starting nickelback and listed him as the third cornerback on the depth chart, behind starting cornerbacks Tre'Davious White and Levi Wallace.

He injured his hamstring at the start of the season and was subsequently inactive for four games (Weeks 2–5). In Week 8, Johnson made three combined tackles (two solo) and had his lone sack of the season on Carson Wentz during a 13–31 loss against the Philadelphia Eagles. On November 28, 2019, Johnson had a season-high nine combined tackles (seven solo) and made one pass deflection during a 26–15 victory at the Dallas Cowboys. He finished the season with a total of 50 combined tackles (39 solo), five pass deflections, and one sack in 12 games and seven starts. He received an overall grade of 60.6 from Pro Football Focus in 2019.

The Buffalo Bills finished the 2019 NFL season second in the AFC East with a 10–6 record to clinch a Wildcard position. On January 4, 2020, Johnson started in his first career playoff game, but was limited to one pass deflection as the Bills lost 19–22 in overtime at the Houston Texans in the AFC Wild-Card Game.

==== 2020 ====
He entered training camp slated as the starting nickelback. He was named the starting nickelback to begin the season and was listed as the third cornerback on the depth chart, behind Tre'Davious White and Josh Norman.

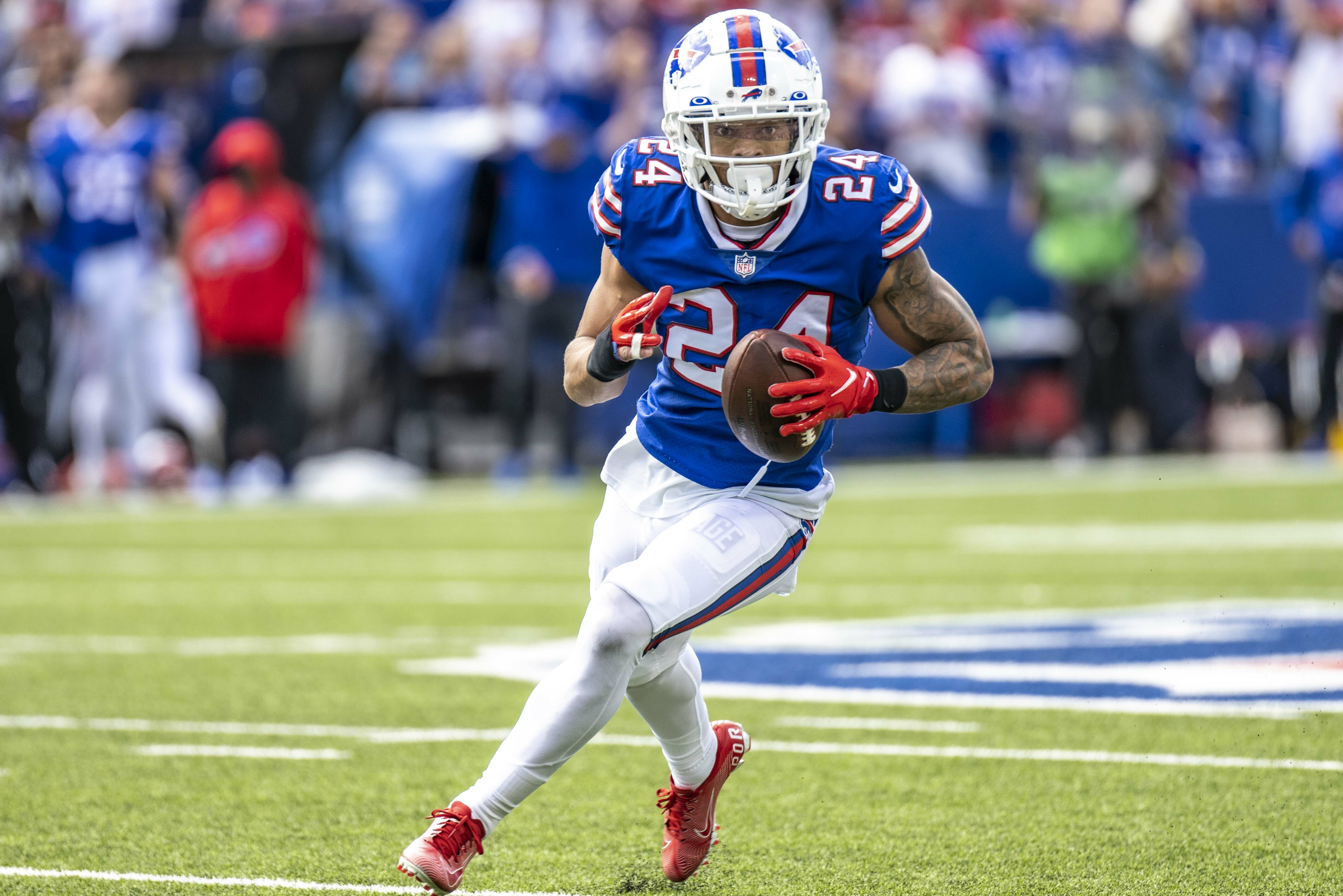
Johnson with the Buffalo Bills in 2021.

In Week 3, Johnson collected a season-high ten combined tackles (nine solo) during a 35–32 win against the Las Vegas Raiders. In Week 12, he recorded six combined tackles (three solo) and set a season-high with two pass deflections during a 27–17 win against the Los Angeles Chargers. On December 13, 2020, Johnson had seven combined tackles (four solo), one pass deflection, and had his first career pick six after picking off a pass attempt thrown by Ben Roethlisberger to wide receiver JuJu Smith-Schuster and returned it 51–yards, scoring his the first touchdown of his career as the Bills defeated the Pittsburgh Steelers 26–15 on Sunday Night Football. He finished the season with 94 combined tackles (70 solo), seven pass deflections, one interception, one sack, and one touchdown in 16 games and 11 starts. He received an overall grade of 61.5 from Pro Football Focus in 2020.

The Buffalo Bills finished atop the AFC East in the 2020 NFL season with a 13–3 record. In the AFC Wild-Card Game, they defeated the Indianapolis Colts 27–24. On January 16, 2021, Johnson appeared in the Divisional Round against the Baltimore Ravens and had six solo tackles, a pass deflection, and intercepted a pass by Lamar Jackson to tight end Mark Andrews in the Bills' endzone and returned it 101–yards and scored a touchdown as the Bills won 17–3. This return tied the longest in NFL playoff history with George Teague, and was later described as "franchise altering" by the press. On January 24, 2021, he made five combined tackles (three solo) and two pass deflections during the Bills' 24–38 loss at the Kansas City Chiefs in the AFC Championship Game.

==== 2021 ====
He returned as the Bills' starting nickelback and started alongside Tre'Davious White and Levi Wallace. On September 12, 2021, Johnson started in the Buffalo Bills' home-opener against the Pittsburgh Steelers and had seven solo tackles and set a season-high with two pass deflections during their 16–23 loss. He was inactive for a 40–0 victory against the Houston Texans in Week 4 due to a groin injury. On October 9, 2021, the Buffalo Bills signed Johnson to a three–year, $24.00 million contract extension that included $13.75 million guaranteed, $10.50 million guaranteed upon signing, and an initial signing bonus of $4.00 million.

In Week 5, he set a season-high with 12 combined tackles (eight solo) and made one pass deflection during a 38–20 win at the Kansas City Chiefs. On November 14, 2021, Johnson had four solo tackles, one pass deflection, and had his only interception of the season on a pass by Mike White to wide receiver Keelan Cole during a 45–17 victory at the New York Jets. He finished the season with 76 combined tackles (53 solo), seven pass deflections, a career-high three sacks, a forced fumble, and one interception in 16 games and 15 starts. He received an overall grade of 69.6 from Pro Football Focus in 2021.

==== 2022 ====
He returned as the de facto starting nickelback under defensive coordinator Leslie Frazier in 2022. Head coach Sean McDermott named him the first-team nickelback to begin the season and listed him as the third cornerback on the depth chart, behind Dane Jackson and Christian Benford, as Tre'Davious White recovered from his torn ACL.

On September 8, 2022, Johnson started in the Buffalo Bills' season-opener at the Los Angeles Rams and set a season-high with nine combined tackles (five solo) and had one pass deflection in their 31–10 victory. In Week 6, Johnson had six combined tackles (four solo), one pass deflection, and secured the Bills' 24–20 victory at the Kansas City Chiefs by intercepting a pass by Patrick Mahomes to wide receiver Skyy Moore with only 56 seconds remaining in the game. In Week 13, he made four combined tackles (three solo) and set a season-high with two pass deflections during a 24–10 win at the New England Patriots. He finished the season with a total of 90 combined tackles (67 solo), a career-high nine pass deflections, and one interception in 17 games and 16 starts. Pro Football Focus had Johnson earn an overall grade of 68.3 in 2022.

==== 2023 ====
Head coach Sean McDermott took over the duties as defensive coordinator following the departure of Leslie Frazier. He retained Johnson as the starting nickelback and he started alongside Tre'Davious White and Christian Benford. On October 15, 2023, Johnson collected a career-high 15 combined tackles (nine solo) and made one pass deflection during a 14–9 win against the New York Giants. In Week 16, he had seven combined tackles (six solo) and set a season-high with two pass deflections during a 24–22 victory at the Los Angeles Chargers. He started in all 17 games for the first time in his career and had a career-high 98 combined tackles (72 solo), eight pass deflections, a career-high three forced fumbles, one fumble recovery, and one sack. He received an overall grade of 80.4 from Pro Football Focus in 2023, which ranked sixth amongst all cornerbacks. He was also voted second-team AP All-Pro.

==== 2024 ====
On March 18, 2024, the Buffalo Bills signed Johnson to a three–year, $30.75 million contract extension that includes $17.82 million guaranteed upon signing and a signing bonus of $7.25 million. This deal will keep him under contract throughout the 2027 season.

Head coach Sean McDermott promoted linebackers coach Bobby Babich to defensive coordinator following the 2023 NFL season. Johnson remained the Bills' starting nickelback and began the season alongside Rasul Douglas and Christian Benford following the departure of Tre'Davious White in free agency.

On September 8, 2024, Johnson started in the Buffalo Bills' home-opener against the Arizona Cardinals, but suffered a forearm injury on the first drive in a collision with teammate Taylor Rapp on a tackle attempt during their 48–23 victory. He remained inactive for the next four games (Weeks 2–5) due to his injured forearm. In Week 6, Johnson returned and made eight combined tackles (four solo), had one pass deflection, and secured the Bills' 23–20 win at the New York Jets with an interception on a pass attempt by Aaron Rodgers to wide receiver Mike Williams with 2:01 remaining in the fourth quarter. On November 10, 2024, Johnson made three solo tackles, set a season-high with two pass deflections, made one sack, and returned an interception thrown by Joe Flacco to wide receiver Josh Downs for a 23–yard touchdown on the Colts' first offensive play of the game as the Bills won 30–20 at the Indianapolis Colts. His performance in Week 10 against the Colts earned him AFC Defensive Player of the Week. During the 2024 NFL season, Johnson had a total of 65 combined tackles (42 solo), five pass deflections, a career-high two interceptions, one forced fumble, one fumble recovery, and one sack while appearing in 12 games with 12 starts. He received an overall grade of 65.0 from Pro Football Focus in 2024, which ranked 82nd among 222 qualifying cornerbacks.

==== 2025 ====
In the offseason prior to the 2025 season, Johnson underwent shoulder surgery to repair a torn labrum he had suffered in the team's playoff matchup against the Baltimore Ravens in January. Playing in 13 games, Johnson recorded 57 tackles, his lowest since 2019, four passes defensed, and no interceptions.

On March 6, 2026, the Bills announced that Johnson was set to be released at the start of the new year.

=== Las Vegas Raiders ===
On March 11, 2026, Johnson, along with a 2026 seventh-round pick, were traded to the Las Vegas Raiders in exchange for a 2026 sixth-round pick.

== NFL career statistics ==
Legend
**Bold**	Career high
	NFL record

=== Regular season ===
Year	Team	Games		Tackles					Interceptions						Fumbles				
Year	Team	GP	GS	Cmb	Solo	Ast	TFL	Sck	PD	Int	Yds	Avg	Lng	TD	FF	FR	Yds	Avg	TD
2018	BUF	11	2	42	34	8	1	1.0	3	1	1	0	0.0	0	1	0	0	0.0	0
2019	BUF	12	7	50	39	11	2	1.0	5	0	0	0.0	0	0	1	0	0	0.0	0
2020	BUF	16	11	94	70	24	5	1.0	7	1	**51**	**51.0**	**51**	**1**	1	0	0	0.0	0
2021	BUF	16	15	76	53	23	4	**3.0**	7	1	4	4.0	4	0	1	0	0	0.0	0
2022	BUF	16	15	90	67	23	**6**	0.0	**9**	1	2	2.0	2	0	0	**1**	0	0.0	0
2023	BUF	**17**	**17**	**98**	**72**	**26**	3	1.0	8	0	0	0.0	0	0	**3**	**1**	0	0.0	0
2024	BUF	12	12	65	42	23	1	1.0	5	**2**	23	11.5	23	**1**	1	**1**	0	0.0	**1**
2025	BUF	13	8	57	34	23	1	0.0	4	0	0	0.0	0	0	0	0	0	0.0	0
2026	LVR	10	8	34	21	13	1	0.5	2	0	0	0.0	0	0	1	1	0	0.0	0
Career		124	95	606	432	174	24	8.5	50	6	80	13.3	51	2	9	4	0	0.0	1

=== Postseason ===
Year	Team	Games		Tackles					Interceptions						Fumbles		
Year	Team	GP	GS	Cmb	Solo	Ast	TFL	Sck	PD	Int	Yds	Avg	Lng	TD	FF	FR	TD
2019	BUF	1	1	0	0	0	0	0.0	1	0	–	–	–	–	0	0	–
2020	BUF	3	2	**17**	**14**	3	**2**	0.0	**3**	**1**	**101**	**101.0**	**101**	**1**	0	0	–
2021	BUF	2	2	12	9	3	1	**1.0**	0	0	–	–	–	–	0	0	–
2022	BUF	2	2	13	9	**4**	1	0.0	2	0	–	–	–	–	0	0	–
2023	BUF	2	2	8	5	3	0	0.0	0	0	–	–	–	–	**1**	0	–
2024	BUF	3	2	11	7	**4**	0	0.0	1	0	–	–	–	–	0	0	–
2025	BUF	2	1	8	7	1	1	0.0	0	0	–	–	–	–	0	0	–
Career		15	12	69	51	18	5	1.0	7	1	101	101.0	101	1	1	0	0

== Personal life ==
Johnson married his wife, Meghan, in June 2023. Together, they have a son, and were reported to be expecting a second child in August 2025.
