= Christian Benford =

American football player (born 2000)

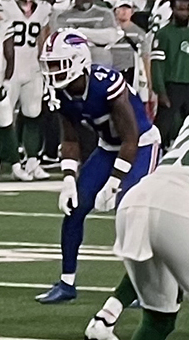
- Benford with the Buffalo Bills in 2023

No. 47 – Buffalo Bills
- Position: Cornerback
- Roster status: Active

Personal information
- Born: September 21, 2000 (age 26); Baltimore, Maryland, U.S.
- Listed height: 6 ft 1 in (1.85 m)
- Listed weight: 205 lb (93 kg)

Career information
- High school: Randallstown (Randallstown, Maryland)
- College: Villanova (2018–2021)
- NFL draft: 2022: 6th round, 185th overall pick

Career history
- Buffalo Bills (2022–present)

Awards and highlights
- First-team FCS All-American (2021); CAA Defensive Rookie of the Year (2018); 2× First-team All-CAA (2020, 2021); Third-team All-CAA (2018)

Career NFL statistics as of Week 10, 2026
- Total tackles: 218
- Sacks: 3.0
- Forced fumbles: 4
- Fumble recoveries: 4
- Pass deflections: 37
- Interceptions: 7
- Defensive touchdowns: 2
- Stats at Pro Football Reference

Christian Benford (born September 21, 2000) is an American professional football cornerback for the Buffalo Bills of the National Football League (NFL). He played college football for the Villanova Wildcats.

== Early life ==
Benford was born in Baltimore, Maryland and grew up Randallstown, Maryland, where he attended Randallstown High School. He was named All-Metro and All-Baltimore County as a senior and played for Maryland in the Big 33 Football Classic. He was also a talented basketball player, as he was a member of the Maryland Renegades AAU team. Benford committed to play college football at Villanova over an offer from Morgan State.

== College career ==
Benford played in nine games with eight starts as a true freshman and was named the Colonial Athletic Association (CAA) Defensive Rookie of the Year and third-team All-CAA after making 49 tackles with six pass breakups and five interceptions. He played in ten games with seven starts as a sophomore and broke up five passes with one interception. Benford was named first-team All-CAA in his junior season, which was shortened and played in the spring of 2021 due to the COVID-19 pandemic in the United States. As a senior, Benford recorded 39 tackles with seven interceptions and an NCAA Division I FCS-leading 18 passes broken up and was again named first-team All-CAA.

=== Pre-draft process ===
After concluding his collegiate career at Villanova, Benford was invited to participate in the 2022 Hula Bowl, a college football all-star game held in Orlando, Florida. His selection highlighted his performance at the Division I FCS level and provided an opportunity to showcase his skills to professional scouts.

== Professional career ==
=== Pre-draft ===
NFL.com media analyst Daniel Jeremiah listed Benford as the No. 23 cornerback prospect (145th overall) on his big board. Scouts Inc. had Benford listed as the No. 25 cornerback (220th overall) available in the draft. NFL draft analysts and scouts including Lance Zierlein and DraftScout.com projections for him varied from the fourth or fifth round to as late as the seventh round.

Pre-draft measurables
Height	Weight	Arm length	Hand span	Wingspan	40-yard dash	10-yard split	20-yard split	20-yard shuttle	Three-cone drill	Vertical jump	Broad jump	Bench press
6 ft 0 1/2 in (1.84 m)	208 lb (94 kg)	31 in (0.79 m)	9 3/4 in (0.25 m)	6 ft 2 3/4 in (1.90 m)	4.53 s	1.51 s	2.63 s	4.34 s	7.10 s	35.0 in (0.89 m)	10 ft 4 in (3.15 m)	17 reps
All values from Pro Day

=== 2022 ===
The Buffalo Bills selected Benford in the sixth round (185th overall) of the 2022 NFL draft. He was the 25th cornerback selected and the second cornerback drafted by the Buffalo Bills in 2022, following first-round pick (23rd overall) Kaiir Elam. The Bills acquired this selection from the Carolina Panthers in exchange for defensive end Darryl Johnson. He became the first player drafted from Villanova since Tanoh Kpassagnon (2017) and their first defensive back drafted since David Martin (1981).

External videos
- Bills select Christian Benford No. 185

On May 13, 2022, the Bills signed Benford to a four–year, $3.85 million rookie contract that included a signing bonus of $194,276.

Throughout training camp, he competed to be the No. 3 cornerback on the depth chart against Dane Jackson and Cam Lewis. After unexpectedly progressing quicker than expected and performing well, Benford became a candidate to earn a starting cornerback role, challenging fellow rookie Kaiir Elam. The continued absence of No. 1 starting cornerback Tre'Davious White and the departure of Levi Wallace necessitated replacements to begin the season. Head coach Sean McDermott named Benford the No. 2 starting cornerback to begin the regular season and paired him with Dane Jackson.

On September 8, 2022, Benford made his professional regular season debut and earned his first career start in the Buffalo Bills' season-opener at the Los Angeles Rams and recorded three combined tackles (one solo) and had a pass deflection as the defeated the Rams 31–10. In Week 3, Benford exited during the second quarter of a 19–21 loss at the Miami Dolphins due to a fractured hand. He was subsequently inactive, but was only limited to missing two games (Weeks 4–5). He was replaced as a starting cornerback by Kaiir Elam during his absence, but regained his position after Elam injured his ankle in Week 9. On November 13, 2022, Benford set a season-high with seven combined tackles (five solo), three pass deflections, and made the first interception of his career on a pass attempt thrown by Kirk Cousins to wide receiver K.J. Osborn during a 30–33 overtime loss against the Minnesota Vikings. In Week 12, he made four combined tackles (two solo) before exiting during the third quarter of the Lions' 28–25 victory at the Detroit Lions on Thanksgiving Day due to an injured oblique. On November 26, 2022, the Bills officially placed him on injured reserve where he remained inactive for the last five games (Weeks 13–18). On January 6, 2023, the Bills activated Benford from injured reserve two days before their Week 18 matchup with the New England Patriots, but he remained inactive during their 35–23 victory. He finished his rookie season with 24 combined tackles (17 solo), five pass deflections, and one interception in nine games and five starts. He received an overall grade of 59.7 from Pro Football Focus as a rookie in 2022.

=== 2023 ===
On February 28, 2023, the Buffalo Bills announced that defensive coordinator Leslie Frazier would not be returning to the in 2023 and would possibly return to coaching in 2024, but it would be unlikely be with the Bills. Following his departure, head coach Sean McDermott temporarily took over as defensive coordinator. Throughout training camp, Benford competed against Dane Jackson and Kaiir Elam for the role as the No. 2 starting cornerback. He began the season as the No. 2 starting cornerback, alongside Tre'Davious White and nickelback Taron Johnson.

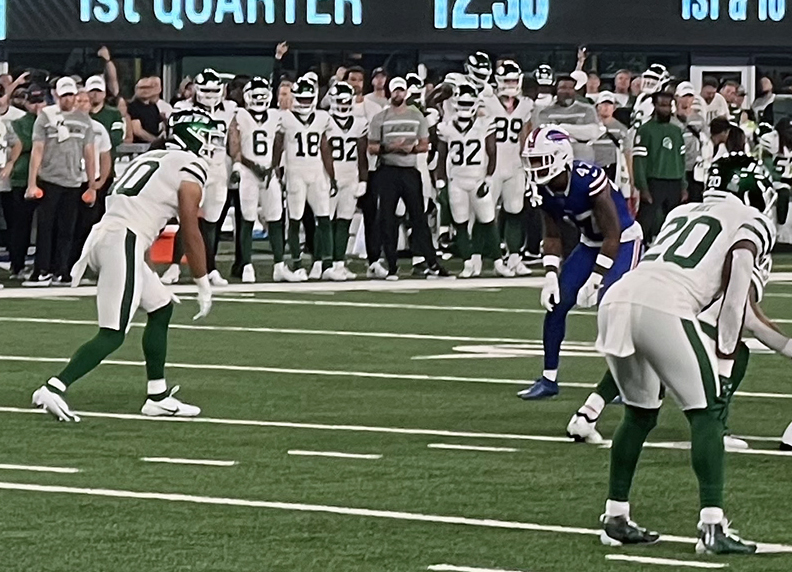
Benford (#47) lining up against Allen Lazard (#10) of the New York Jets in 2023

He would be inactive for the Bills' 20–25 loss to the Jacksonville Jaguars in Week 5 due to a shoulder injury. Simultaneously, fellow starting cornerback Tre'Davious White tore his Achilles and would be placed on injured reserve in Week 5. On October 15, 2023, he set a season-high with nine combined tackles (eight solo) and recorded one pass deflection during a 14–9 victory against the New York Giants. On October 31, 2023, the Bills traded the Green Bay Packers for cornerback Rasul Douglas and he would start alongside Benford for the remainder of the season. He was inactive again as the Bills lost 22–24 to the Denver Broncos in Week 10 after injuring his hamstring. In Week 15, Benford made one solo tackle, tied his season-high of two pass deflections, and had his first interception of the season on a pass by Dak Prescott to wide receiver Brandin Cooks as the Bills defeated the Dallas Cowboys 31–10. On January 7, 2024, Benford had three combined tackles (two solo), made one pass deflection, and intercepted a pass by Tua Tagovailoa to wide receiver Tyreek Hill on the opening drive of a 21–14 victory at the Miami Dolphins, to help the Bills finish the season on a five-game winning streak. He finished the season with a total of 54 combined tackles (43 solo), 10 passes defensed, two interceptions, and two forced fumbles, and only missed one tackle, enough for Pro Football Focus to give him their 8th highest score among corners that season, tied with Douglas. He received an overall grade of 83.0 from Pro Football Focus, which ranked 9th among all qualifying cornerbacks in 2023.

The Buffalo Bills finished the 2023 NFL season first in the AFC East with a 11–6 record to clinch a playoff berth. On January 15, 2024, Benford started in his first career playoff game, but was limited to one solo tackle before exiting in the first quarter of a 31–17 win over the Pittsburgh Steelers in the AFC Wild-Card Game after injuring his knee. He subsequently would be inactive as the Bills lost 27–24 against the Kansas City Chiefs in the Divisional Round. The Chiefs would go on to win Super Bowl LVIII.

=== 2024 ===
He entered training camp slated as the No. 1 starting cornerback following the departure of Tre'Davious White under new defensive coordinator Bobby Babich. Head coach Sean McDermott named Benford and Rasul Douglas the starting cornerbacks to begin the season, alongside nickelback Taron Johnson. In Week 2, he recorded seven combined tackles (six solo), made one pass deflection, and intercepted a pass by Tua Tagovailoa to wide receiver Robbie Chosen during a 31–10 victory at the Miami Dolphins. He was inactive for the Bills' 30–27 win against the Miami Dolphins in Week 9 after injuring his wrist. In Week 14, he set a season-high with eight combined tackles (six solo) and two pass deflections during a 42–44 loss at the Los Angeles Rams. The following week, Benford made six combined tackles (five solo), a pass deflection, and had his first career sack on Jared Goff for an eight–yard loss during a 48–42 win at the Detroit Lions in Week 15. On December 29, 2024, Benford made two solo tackles, one pass deflection, and tied his career-high with his second interception of the season on a pass by Aaron Rodgers to wide receiver Allen Lazard as the Bills defeated the New York Jets 40–14. Head coach Sean McDermott chose rest Benford and listed him inactive as a healthy scratch for the Bills' 16–23 loss at the New England Patriots in Week 18 in order to rest for the playoffs. He finished the season with a total of 64 combined tackles (50 solo), ten pass deflections, two interceptions, two forced fumbles, one fumble recovery, and one sack in 15 games and 15 starts. He received an overall grade of 79.3 from Pro Football Focus, which ranked 6th amongst 222 qualifying cornerbacks in 2024.

The Buffalo Bills finished the season a top the AFC East with a 13–4 record. On January 19, 2025, Benford recorded five combined tackles (three solo) during a 27–25 victory against his hometown Baltimore Ravens in the Divisional Round. The following week, he started in the AFC Championship Game and recorded three combined tackles (two solo) made a pass deflection as the Bills lost 29–32 at the Kansas City Chiefs.

=== 2025 ===
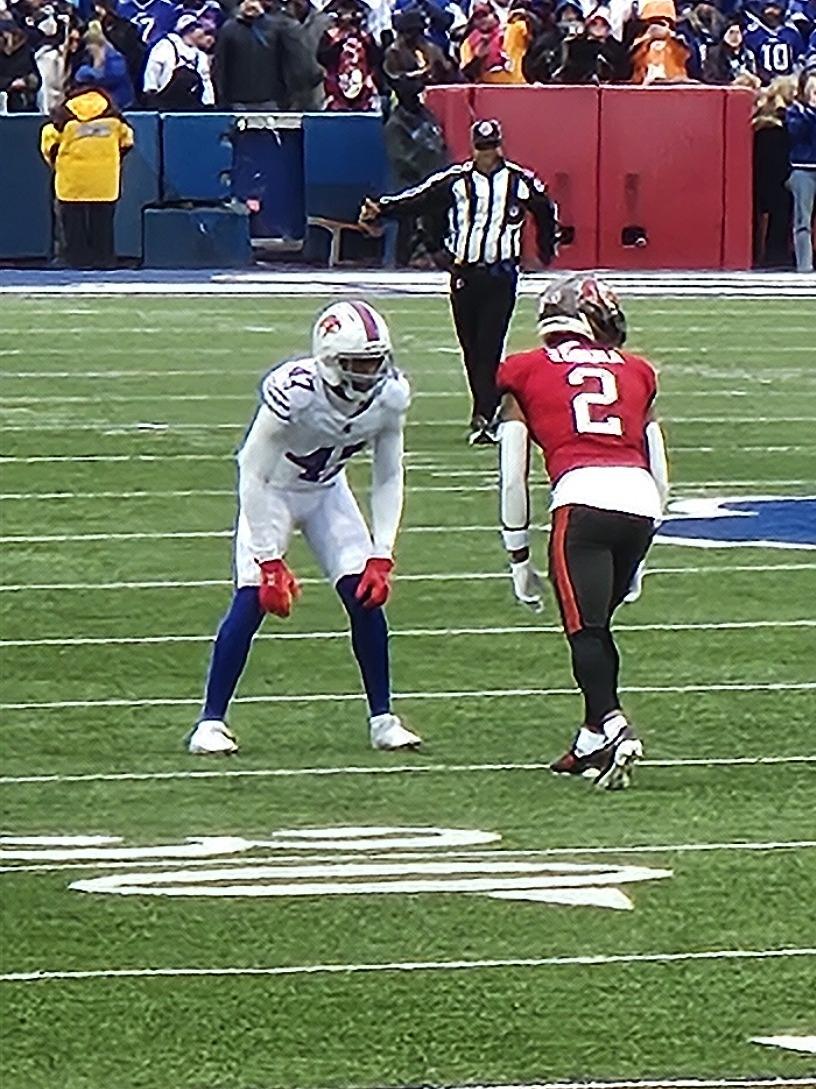
Benford lined up on Emeka Egbuka of the Tampa Bay Buccaneers in 2025

On March 29, 2025, the Buffalo Bills signed Benford to a four–year, $69 million contract extension that includes $37.63 million guaranteed, $18.85 million guaranteed upon signing, and an initial signing bonus of $7.5 million. Including incentives, the entire contract has a maximum value of $76 million. In Week 13, Benford recorded an interception and recovered a fumble for a touchdown in a 26-7 win over the Pittsburgh Steelers, earning AFC Defensive Player of the Week. In Week 14, Benford intercepted a pass thrown by Cincinnati Bengals quarterback Joe Burrow to wide receiver Ja'Marr Chase and returned it 63 yards for a touchdown. Benford's pick-six touchdown was part of a sequence in which the Bills scored 21 points in under 5 minutes in the fourth quarter to take the lead en route to a 39–34 win over the Bengals. He also recorded a sack on a cornerback blitz.

== NFL career statistics ==
Legend
	Led the league
**Bold**	Career High

=== Regular season ===
Year	Team	Games		Tackles						Interceptions						Fumbles				
Year	Team	GP	GS	Cmb	Solo	Ast	TFL	Sck	Sfty	PD	Int	Yds	Avg	Lng	TD	FF	FR	Yds	Avg	TD
2022	BUF	9	5	24	17	7	1	0.0	0	5	1	35	**35.0**	35	0	0	0	—	—	0
2023	BUF	15	14	54	43	11	3	0.0	0	**10**	**2**	8	4.0	8	0	**2**	1	0	0.0	0
2024	BUF	15	15	**64**	**50**	**14**	3	1.0	0	**10**	**2**	30	15.0	24	0	**2**	1	**43**	**43.0**	0
2025	BUF	14	14	43	32	11	**4**	**2.0**	0	4	**2**	**63**	31.5	**63**	**1**	0	**2**	23	11.5	**1**
2026	BUF	8	8	33	23	10	0	0.0	0	8	0	0	—	0	0	0	0	—	—	0
Career		61	56	218	165	53	11	3.0	0	37	7	136	19.4	63	1	4	4	66	16.5	1

=== Postseason ===
Year	Team	Games		Tackles						Interceptions						Fumbles				
Year	Team	GP	GS	Cmb	Solo	Ast	TFL	Sck	Sfty	PD	Int	Yds	Avg	Lng	TD	FF	FR	Yds	Avg	TD
2023	BUF	1	1	1	1	0	0	0.0	0	0	0	–	–	–	–	**1**	0	0	0.0	0
2024	BUF	3	3	**12**	**8**	**4**	**1**	0.0	0	1	0	–	–	–	–	0	0	0	0.0	0
2025	BUF	2	2	5	4	1	0	0.0	0	**2**	0	–	–	–	–	0	0	0	0.0	0
Career		6	6	18	13	5	1	0.0	0	3	0	0	0	0	0	1	0	0	0.0	0

== Personal life ==
Christian Benford had a son while in college at Villanova. His son's name is Calvin. Outside of football, Benford is very philanthropic. He is deeply invested in giving back to local communities, working with organizations like the Baltimore Homeless Project and Buffalo City Mission, hosting food and clothing drives, and inspiring kids through the NFL Foundation's Play 60 movement and youth camps.

In March 2025, Mynd Matters Publishing announced that they were partnering with Benford and that he would be joining their team as a children's author.
