= Rasul Douglas =

American football player (born 1995)

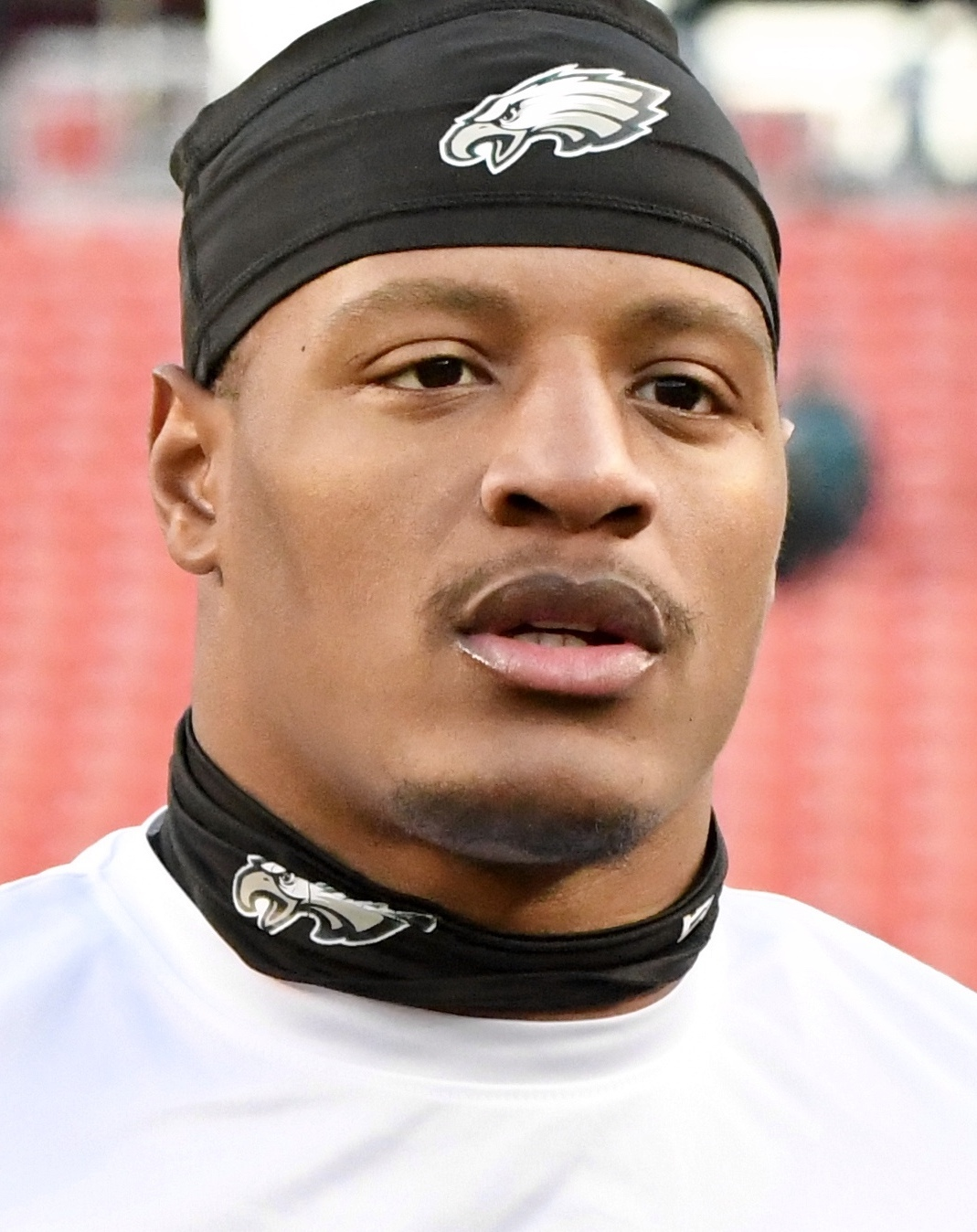
- Douglas with the Philadelphia Eagles in 2019

No. 29 – Washington Commanders
- Position: Cornerback
- Roster status: Active

Personal information
- Born: August 29, 1995 (age 31); East Orange, New Jersey, U.S.
- Listed height: 6 ft 2 in (1.88 m)
- Listed weight: 209 lb (95 kg)

Career information
- High school: East Orange Campus
- College: Nassau CC (2012–2014); West Virginia (2015–2016)
- NFL draft: 2017: 3rd round, 99th overall pick

Career history
- Philadelphia Eagles (2017–2019); Carolina Panthers (2020); Las Vegas Raiders (2021)*; Houston Texans (2021)*; Arizona Cardinals (2021)*; Green Bay Packers (2021–2023); Buffalo Bills (2023–2024); Miami Dolphins (2025); Washington Commanders (2026–present)
- * Offseason or practice squad member only

Awards and highlights
- Super Bowl champion (LII); First-team All-Big 12 (2016)

Career NFL statistics as of Week 10, 2026
- Tackles: 532
- Sacks: 3.0
- Forced fumbles: 4
- Fumble recoveries: 3
- Pass deflections: 99
- Interceptions: 24
- Defensive touchdowns: 3
- Stats at Pro Football Reference

Rasul Douglas (born August 29, 1995) is an American professional football cornerback for the Washington Commanders of the National Football League (NFL). Douglas played college football for the West Virginia Mountaineers and was selected by the Philadelphia Eagles in the third round of the 2017 NFL draft. He has also been a member of the Carolina Panthers, Las Vegas Raiders, Houston Texans, Arizona Cardinals, Green Bay Packers, and Buffalo Bills.

== College career ==
Douglas started his college career at Nassau Community College. After redshirting in 2012, he recorded 83 tackles and five interceptions over the 2013 and 2014 seasons. In 2015, he transferred to West Virginia University. During his first season at West Virginia, he appeared in 11 games and recorded seven tackles and an interception. As a senior in 2016, Douglas was named first-team All-Big 12 Conference after he tied for the nation lead with eight interceptions. He also had 70 tackles and a sack.

== Professional career ==
=== Pre-draft ===
External videos
- Eagles Unofficial Visit: Rasul Douglas
- Meet the Prospect: Rasul Douglas

Coming out of West Virginia, Douglas was projected to be a third-to-fifth round pick from the majority of NFL draft experts and analysts. He received an invitation to the NFL Combine and completed all of the required combine and positional drills. On March 31, 2017, Douglas participated at West Virginia's pro day and opted to run the 40, 20, and 10-yard dash once again while also performing positional drills. Team representatives and scouts from all 32 NFL teams attended to scout Douglas, K. J. Dillon, Shelton Gibson, Tyler Orlosky, and 14 other prospects. He was ranked the 19th best cornerback prospect in the draft by NFLDraftScout.com. Pro Football Focus ranked Douglas as the 16th best cornerback prospect in the 2017 NFL Draft.

Pre-draft measurables
Height	Weight	Arm length	Hand span	Wingspan	40-yard dash	10-yard split	20-yard split	20-yard shuttle	Three-cone drill	Vertical jump	Broad jump	Bench press
6 ft 1 5/8 in (1.87 m)	209 lb (95 kg)	32 3/8 in (0.82 m)	9 1/4 in (0.23 m)	6 ft 4 7/8 in (1.95 m)	4.59 s	1.52 s	2.64 s	4.26 s	6.97 s	33.5 in (0.85 m)	10 ft 0 in (3.05 m)	16 reps
All values from NFL Combine

=== Philadelphia Eagles ===
External videos
- Eagles select Rasul Douglas 99th overall
- Rasul Douglas College Highlights

The Philadelphia Eagles selected Douglas in the third round (99th overall) of the 2017 NFL draft. The Baltimore Ravens originally held the third round pick (99th overall), but orchestrated a trade to send defensive tackle Timmy Jernigan and the 99th overall pick to the Eagles in exchange for their third round pick (74th overall), which was used to select defensive end Chris Wormley. He was the 17th cornerback selected in the draft, and the second selected by Philadelphia after Sidney Jones in the second round (42nd overall).

==== 2017 season ====
On May 11, 2017, the Philadelphia Eagles signed Douglas to a four–year, $3.17 million contract that included an initial signing bonus of $706,288.

External videos
- Rookies Journey: Rasul Douglas

Throughout training camp, Douglas competed against Patrick Robinson, Jalen Mills, Ron Brooks, Ronald Darby, Jaylen Watkins, Aaron Grymes, and Sidney Jones for a role as a starting cornerback under defensive coordinator Jim Schwartz. Head coach Doug Pederson named him the fourth cornerback on the Eagles' depth chart to start the regular season, behind Darby, Mills, and Robinson.

Douglas was inactive for the Eagles' season-opening 30–17 victory over the Washington Redskins. During the second quarter, starting cornerback Darby dislocated his ankle, sidelining him for 4–6 weeks. In Week 2, Douglas made his professional regular season debut against the Kansas City Chiefs and finished with four solo tackles and a pass deflection in the 27–20 loss. In Week 3 against the New York Giants, Douglas earned his first career start at nickelback alongside Jalen Mills and Patrick Robinson and recorded four combined tackles (three solo), defended a pass, and had his first career interception on a pass thrown by quarterback Eli Manning to wide receiver Brandon Marshall during a 27–24 victory. In Week 6 on the road against the Carolina Panthers, Douglas made a season-high three pass break ups and also made two solo tackles and intercepted a pass by Cam Newton during a 28–33 victory. He was inactive as a healthy scratch in Week 15 as the Eagles defeated the New York Giants. He finished his rookie season with 25 combined tackles (23 solo), 11 passes defended, two interceptions in 14 games and five starts.

The Philadelphia Eagles finished first in the NFC East with a 13–3 record, clinching a first round bye. On January 13, 2018, Douglas appeared in his first career playoff game, but was limited to special teams during a 15–10 victory against the Atlanta Falcons in the Divisional Round. On February 4, 2018, Douglas appeared on special teams in Super Bowl LII during a 41–33 victory against the New England Patriots.

==== 2018 season ====
During training camp, Douglas competed to be the starting nickelback and primary backup cornerback against Sidney Jones, Daryl Worley, Avonte Maddox, De'Vante Bausby, and Chandon Sullivan. Head coach Doug Pederson named Douglas as the fourth cornerback on the depth chart to begin the regular season, behind starters Ronald Darby and Jalen Mills, as well as nickelback Avonte Maddox.

On September 6, 2018, Douglas appeared in the Philadelphia Eagles' home-opener against the Atlanta Falcons and broke up a pass and made his first interception of the season off a pass thrown by Matt Ryan to wide receiver Julio Jones during a 12–18 victory. On December 9, 2018, he racked up nine solo tackles, a pass deflection, and intercepted a pass attempt by Dak Prescott during a 23–29 loss at the Dallas Cowboys. The following week, Douglas collected a season-high 14 combined tackles (11 solo) during a 30–23 victory at the Los Angeles Rams in Week 15. He finished his sophomore season in 2018 with a total of 58 combined tackles (48 solo), four pass deflections, and three interceptions in 16 games and seven starts.

The Philadelphia Eagles finished the 2018 NFL season second in the NFC East with a 9–7 record to clinch a Wildcard spot. On January 6, 2019, Douglas started in the first playoff game of his career and collected eight solo tackles and broke up a pass during a 16–15 victory at the Chicago Bears in the NFC Wildcard Game.

==== 2019 season ====
Head coach Doug Pederson named Douglas a backup cornerback to begin the season and listed him fourth on the depth chart, behind starting cornerbacks Ronald Darby and Sidney Jones and nickelback Avonte Maddox.

In Week 6, he collected a season-high six combined tackles (five solo) during a 34–27 victory at the Minnesota Vikings. He finished the 2019 NFL season with a total of 35 combined tackles (24 solo) and ten pass deflections in 16 games and six starts.

==== 2020 season ====
Douglas competed against Avonte Maddox, Cre'von LeBlanc, and Nickell Robey-Coleman to be the No. 2 starting cornerback opposite Darius Slay. On September 5, 2020, the Philadelphia Eagles waived Douglas during final roster cuts.

=== Carolina Panthers ===
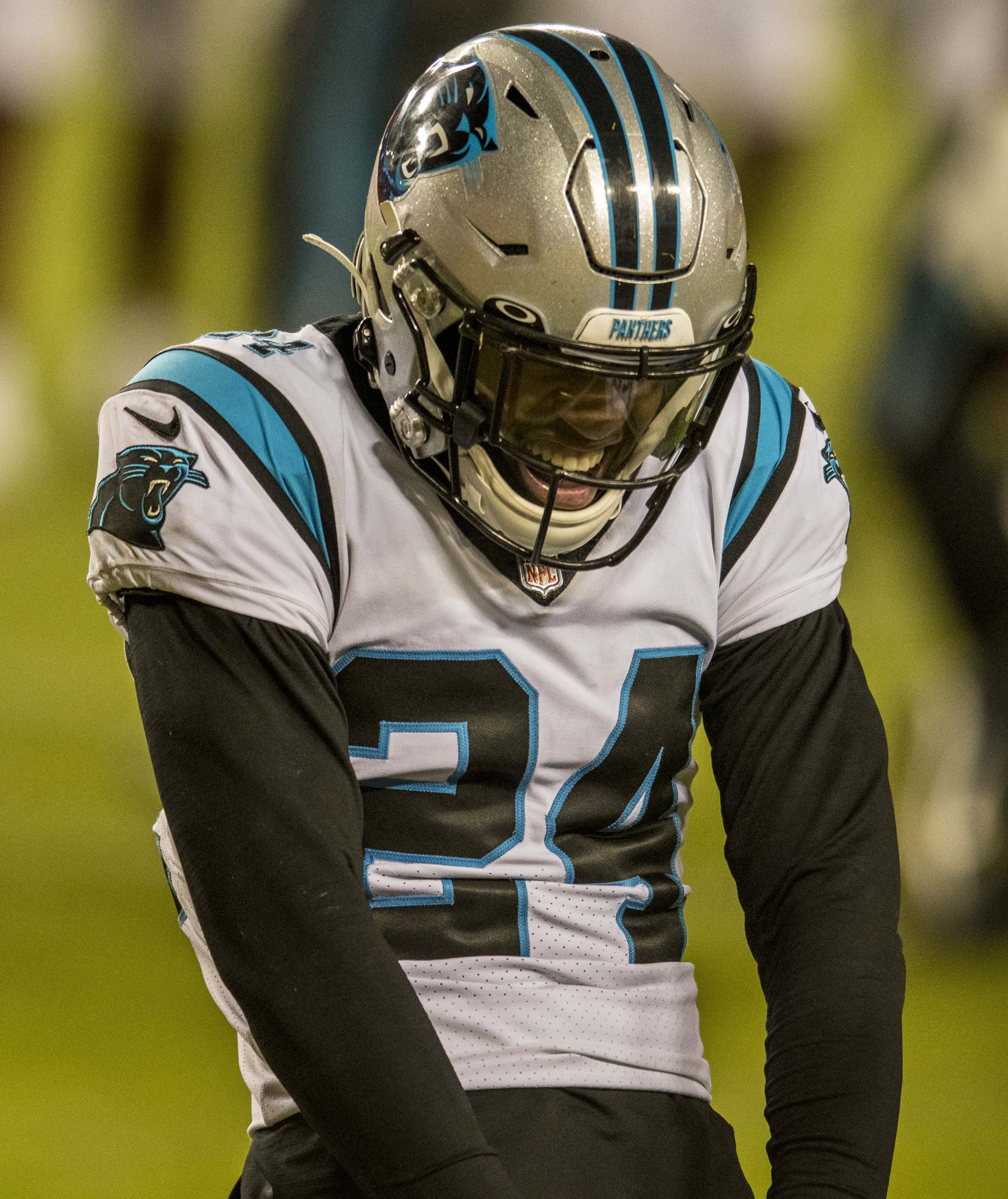
Douglas with the Carolina Panthers in 2020

On September 6, 2020, the Carolina Panthers claimed Douglas off waivers. Head coach Matt Rhule named him the third cornerback on the depth chart, behind starters Donte Jackson and rookie Troy Pride, to begin the season. By Week 2, he was promoted to starter alongside Donte Jackson after surpassing Troy Pride on the depth chart. On October 11, 2020, Douglas racked up a season-high eight combined tackles (six solo) and broke up a pass as the Panthers won 23–16 at the Atlanta Falcons. The following week, he made one solo tackle and a season-high three pass deflections during a 16–23 loss against the Chicago Bears in Week 6. On October 23, 2020, the Carolina Panthers placed Douglas on the reserve/COVID-19 list and he was subsequently sidelined for two games (Weeks 7–8). On November 2, 2020, the Panthers activated Douglas from their reserve/COVID-19 list. He finished the 2020 NFL season with a total of 62 combined tackles (50 solo) and nine pass deflections in 14 games and 11 starts.

=== Las Vegas Raiders ===
==== 2021 season ====
On April 19, 2021, the Las Vegas Raiders signed Douglas. During training camp, Douglas competed to be a starting cornerback against Trayvon Mullen, Damon Arnette, Amik Robertson, Isaiah Johnson, and Nate Hobbs. On August 23, 2021, the Las Vegas Raiders released Douglas.

=== Houston Texans ===
On August 25, 2021, the Houston Texans signed Douglas. On August 31, 2021, he was released by the Houston Texans.

=== Arizona Cardinals ===
On September 3, 2021, Douglas was signed to the practice squad of the Arizona Cardinals.

=== Green Bay Packers ===
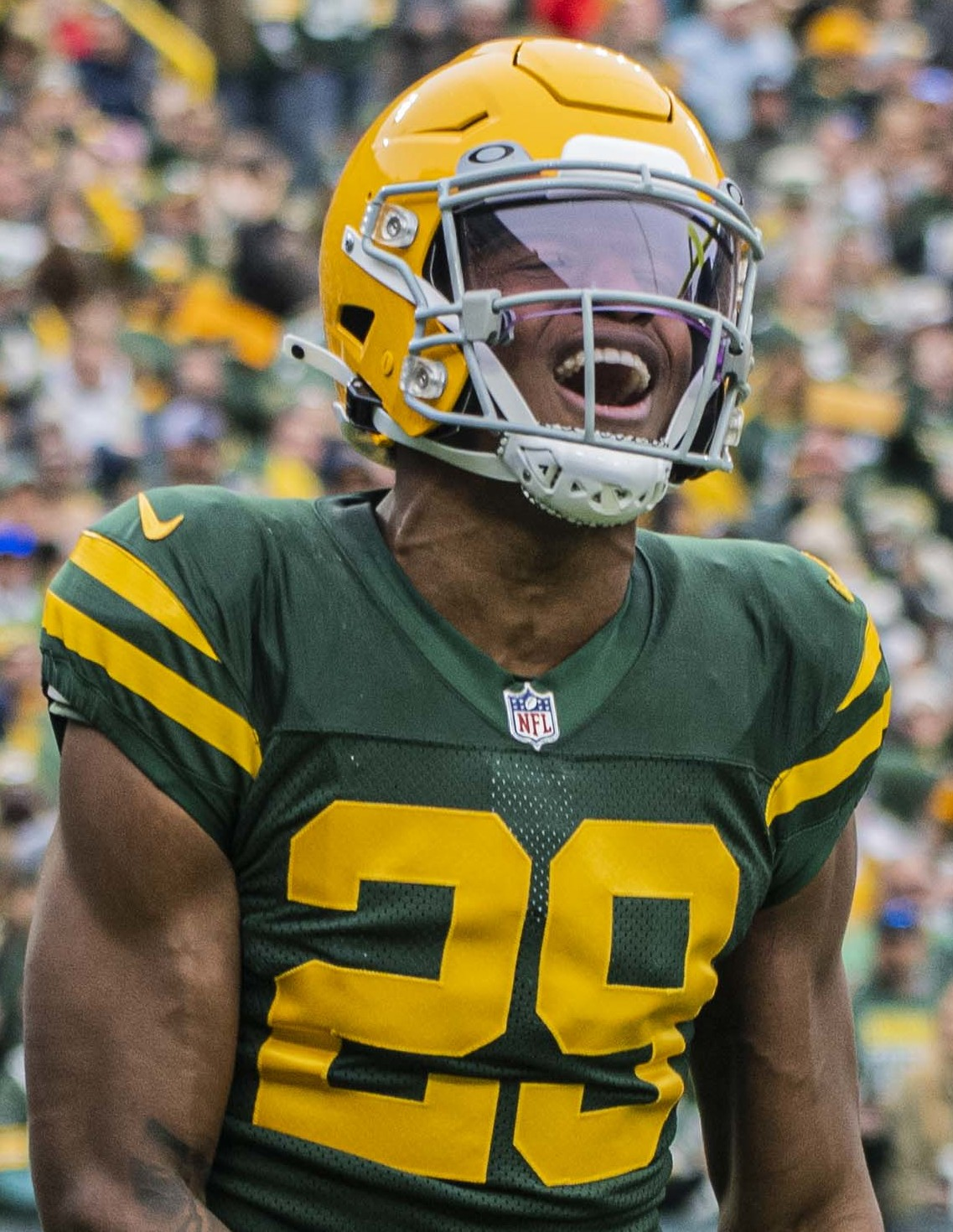
Douglas with the Green Bay Packers in 2021

On October 6, 2021, the Green Bay Packers signed Douglas off the Arizona Cardinals' practice squad, following injuries to starting cornerbacks Jaire Alexander and Kevin King. On October 17, 2021, Douglas appeared in his first game as a member of the Green Bay Packers after replacing backup cornerback Isaac Yiadom after Yiadom committed a pass interference penalty on the opening drive. Douglas made five solo tackles in his debut with the Packers in Week 6 as they won 24–14 at the Chicago Bears. Going into Week 7, head coach Matt LaFleur named Douglas the third cornerback on the depth chart behind starting cornerbacks Eric Stokes and Chandon Sullivan and made him the starting nickelback. On October 28, 2021, Douglas made a season-high nine solo tackles, deflected two pases, and had his first interception with the Packers on a Hail Mary pass thrown by Kyler Murray to wide receiver A. J. Green in the end zone during the final seconds to seal a 24–21 win at the Arizona Cardinals. Leading into a Week 10 matchup against the Seattle Seahawks, defensive coordinator Joe Barry named Douglas a starting cornerback alongside Eric Stokes, supplanting Kevin King who had returned from injury.

On November 28, 2021, Douglas made six combined tackles (three solo), a career-high four pass deflections, and intercepted a pass from Matthew Stafford that was intended for Cooper Kupp and returned it 33 yards to score his first career touchdown during the third quarter of a 36–28 win over the Los Angeles Rams. For his performance, Douglas received his first National Football Conference Defensive Player of the Week honor. Immediately the following week, on December 12, 2021, Douglas made two solo tackles, one pass deflection, and recorded his second consecutive interception return for a touchdown after intercepting a pass by Bears quarterback Justin Fields to wide receiver Darnell Mooney en route to a 45–30 victory against the Chicago Bears. On December 25, 2021, Douglas made five solo tackles, two pass deflections, and a career-high two interceptions on passes Baker Mayfield, including one with the Browns driving for a potential game-winning drive with under a minute to play In a 24–22 Christmas Day victory over the Cleveland Browns. He finished the season with 57 combined tackles (52 solo), 13 pass deflections, a career-high five interceptions, and two touchdowns in 13 games and nine starts.

==== 2022 season ====
On March 19, 2022, the Green Bay Packers signed Douglas to a three–year, $21.00 million extension that includes an initial signing bonus of $5.30 million. Head coach Matt LaFleur named Douglas the third cornerback on the depth chart to begin the regular season, behind starters Jaire Alexander and Eric Stokes.

In Week 3, Douglas collected a season-high eight solo tackles and made two pass deflections during a 14–12 win at the Tampa Bay Buccaneers. On October 23, 2022, Douglas racked up a season-high ten combined tackles (five solo) and a season-high three pass deflections as the Packers lost 21–23 at the Washington Commanders. The following week, he recorded six solo tackles, one pass break up, a season-high one sack, and intercepted a pass thrown by Josh Allen during a 17–27 loss at the Buffalo Bills. In Week 10, Douglas became a starting cornerback alongside Jaire Alexander for the last eight games of the season after Eric Stokes injured his ankle and was inactive for the rest of the season. He did the season with 85 combined tackles (69 solo), 13 pass deflections, four interceptions, one forced fumble, and one sack in 17 games and 12 starts.

==== 2023 season ====
Douglas began the regular season as a starting cornerback alongside Jaire Alexander due to Eric Stokes beginning the season on the physically unable to perform list. He started in the Green Bay Packers' season-opener at the Chicago Bears and collected a season-high eight combined tackles (six solo) and had one pass deflection during their 38-20 victory.

=== Buffalo Bills ===
On October 31, 2023, Douglas along with a fifth-round pick in the 2024 NFL draft were traded to the Buffalo Bills in exchange for a 2024 third-round pick (91st overall; which the Packers would use to draft Ty'Ron Hopper). Before Week 10, head coach Sean McDermott named Douglas a starting cornerback alongside Dane Jackson, supplanting Christian Benford.

On November 19, 2023, Douglas had four combined tackles (two solo), a season-high three pass deflections, one fumble recovery, and intercepted two pass attempts thrown by Zach Wilson as the Bills routed the New York Jets 32–6. On December 31, 2023, Douglas made two combined tackles (one solo), a season-high three pass deflections, intercepted two passes by Bailey Zappe, and returned one interception 40–yards for a touchdown as the Bills defeated the New England Patriots 27–21. He was named AFC Defensive Player of the Week for a stand-out game in Week 17 against the Patriots. He finished the 2023 NFL season with 61 combined tackles (47 solo), a career-high 14 pass deflections, five interceptions, three fumble recoveries, one sack, and a career-high two touchdowns in 16 games and 15 starts. Douglas earned an overall grade of 81.0 from Pro Football Focus, ranking 12th among all qualifying cornerbacks.

Douglas tore his MCL at some point during the season, but did not miss any games, and played the Bills' final postseason game on the torn ligament. The Buffalo Bills finished the 2023 NFL season first in the AFC East with an 11–5 record, clinching a playoff berth. On January 21, 2024, Douglas made two combined tackles (one solo) and forced a fumble as the Bills lost 24–27 to the Kansas City Chiefs in the Divisional Round.

==== 2024 season ====
During the off-season, linebackers coach Bobby Babich was promoted to defensive coordinator and former No. 1 starting cornerback Tre'Davious White departed to join the Los Angeles Rams during free agency. Throughout training camp, Douglas competed to be the No. 1 starting cornerback against Christian Benford and Kaiir Elam. Head coach Sean McDermott named Douglas and Benford the starting cornerback duo to begin the season.

On September 29, 2024, Douglas collected a season-high seven combined tackles (five solo) as the Bills lost 10–35 at the Baltimore Ravens. In Week 14, he made six combined tackles (four solo) before exiting in the third quarter of 42–44 loss at the Los Angeles Rams after suffering an injury while giving up a touchdown to Cooper Kupp. He injured his back and subsequently missed the next two games (Weeks 15–16). He finished the season with 58 combined tackles (43 solo), five pass deflections, and one forced fumble in 15 games and 15 starts. His overall grade was 59.2 from Pro Football Focus in 2024. On January 19, 2025, Douglas made six combined tackles (five solo) and secured a 27–25 Divisional Playoff win by recovering an onside kick in the final minute against the Baltimore Ravens.

=== Miami Dolphins ===
On August 27, 2025, Douglas signed a one-year contract with the Miami Dolphins. In Week 14, Douglas recorded five pass breakups and an interception in a 34–10 win over the New York Jets, earning AFC Defensive Player of the Week.

=== Washington Commanders ===
On July 9, 2026, Douglas signed a one-year, $3.8 million contract with the Washington Commanders.

== NFL career statistics ==
Legend
	Won the Super Bowl
	Led the league
**Bold**	Career high

=== Regular season ===
Year	Team	Games		Tackles					Interceptions						Fumbles			
Year	Team	GP	GS	Cmb	Solo	Ast	Sck	TFL	Int	Yds	Avg	Lng	TD	PD	FF	FR	Yds	TD
2017	PHI	14	5	25	23	2	0.0	0	2	7	3.5	7	0	11	0	0	0	0
2018	PHI	16	7	58	48	10	0.0	**6**	3	14	4.7	17	0	4	0	0	0	0
2019	PHI	16	6	35	24	11	0.0	3	0	0	0.0	0	0	10	0	0	0	0
2020	CAR	14	11	62	50	12	0.0	1	0	0	0.0	0	0	9	0	0	0	0
2021	GB	12	9	57	52	5	0.0	1	**5**	**105**	21.0	**55**	**2**	13	**1**	0	0	0
2022	GB	17	12	**85**	**69**	16	**1.0**	4	4	26	6.5	22	0	13	**1**	0	0	0
2023	GB	7	7	32	26	6	0.0	2	1	−2	−2	−2	0	**6**	0	1	0	0
2023	BUF	9	8	29	21	8	**1.0**	1	4	58	14.5	40	1	**8**	0	**2**	**2**	0
2024	BUF	15	15	58	43	15	0.0	5	0	0	0.0	0	0	5	**1**	0	0	0
2025	MIA	15	13	62	37	**25**	**1.0**	2	2	43	**21.5**	38	0	13	**1**	0	0	0
Career		135	93	503	393	110	3.0	25	21	251	11.5	55	3	92	4	3	2	0

=== Postseason ===
Year	Team	Games		Tackles					Interceptions						Fumbles			
Year	Team	GP	GS	Cmb	Solo	Ast	Sck	TFL	Int	Yds	Avg	Lng	TD	PD	FF	FR	Yds	TD
2017	PHI	3	0	0	0	0	0.0	0	0	0	0.0	0	0	0	0	0	0	0
2018	PHI	2	2	10	10	0	0.0	0	0	0	0.0	0	0	**1**	0	0	0	0
2019	PHI	1	0	0	0	0	0.0	0	0	0	0.0	0	0	0	0	0	0	0
2021	GB	1	1	5	3	2	0.0	0	0	0	0.0	0	0	**1**	0	0	0	0
2023	BUF	1	1	2	1	1	0.0	0	0	0	0.0	0	0	0	**1**	0	0	0
2024	BUF	3	3	**16**	**12**	**4**	0.0	0	0	0	0.0	0	0	0	0	0	0	0
Career		11	7	33	26	7	0.0	0	0	0	0.0	0	0	2	1	0	0	0

== Personal life ==
Douglas grew up in East Orange, New Jersey, where he and his six other siblings were raised by his grandmother, and attended East Orange Campus High School. Douglas welcomed his first child, son Jeremiah Lusar Douglas, with his girlfriend Ny-Asia Franklin on October 2, 2018.
