= Nickel defense =

American football defensive formation

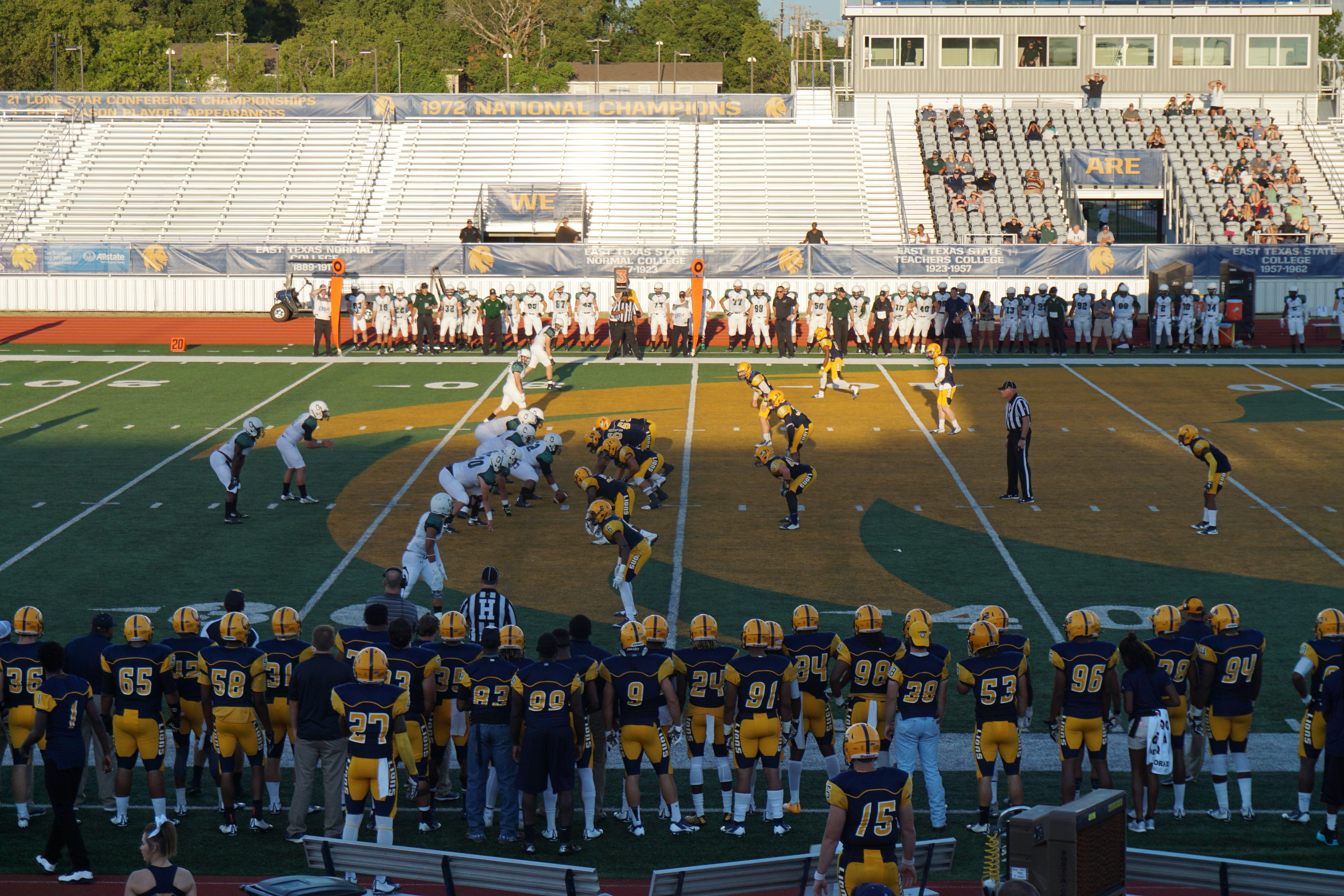
The Texas A&M–Commerce Lions in a nickel defense against the Adams State Grizzlies in 2015

In American football, a nickel defense (also known as a 4–2–5 or 3–3–5) is any defensive alignment that uses five defensive backs, of whom the fifth is known as a nickelback. The original and most common form of the nickel defense features four down linemen and two linebackers. Because the traditional 4–2 form preserves the defense's ability to stop an opponent's running game, it has remained more popular than its variants, to the extent that even when another formation technically falls within the "nickel" definition, coaches and analysts will refer to it by a more specific designation (e.g., "3–3–5" for a lineup of three down linemen and three linebackers) that conveys more information with equal or greater concision.

The nickel defense originated as an innovation of Philadelphia Eagles defensive coach Jerry Williams in 1960 and used successfully in the Eagles' Championship victory over Vince Lombardi's Green Bay Packers that year. He later employed it effectively as a measure to defend against star tight end Mike Ditka of the Chicago Bears, holding Ditka to a single reception in the Eagles' 1961 victory over the Bears. The nickel defense was later used by then Chicago Bears assistant George Allen, who came up with the name "nickel" and later marketed the idea as his own. The nickel defense was popularized by head coach Don Shula and defensive coordinator Bill Arnsparger of the Miami Dolphins in the 1970s and is now commonly employed in obvious passing situations or against a team that frequently uses three+ wide receiver sets on offense. In the 2010s and 2020s, Sean McDermott has primarily used a base nickel defense for his teams due to opponents largely focusing their offenses on the pass. As defensive coordinator of the Carolina Panthers, McDermott had hybrid linebacker/safety Shaq Thompson play as his "big nickel", while as head coach of the Buffalo Bills, he utilized cornerback Taron Johnson in the designated nickel spot due to his tackling and coverage abilities. Thompson later joined the Bills in McDermott's final year as Buffalo's head coach, playing as the third linebacker in run situations and when Johnson was injured.

In college football, TCU is known to use a nickel defense as its base set, typically playing three safeties and two linebackers. Former Horned Frogs coach Gary Patterson installed the nickel partly out of necessity upon finding that larger and more prominent programs, most notably those of the large public universities in Texas, were able to "recruit away" most of the large athletes who would otherwise be available to the TCU program. As it turned out, the nickel proved to be a very good set against the spread offenses proliferating throughout college football in the early 21st century.

A common defensive front adjustment for 3–4 teams to accommodate the nickel backfield involves putting the two outside linebackers into a three-point stance shading the offensive tackles (i.e., a 5 technique). To complete the adjustment, the 3–4 defensive ends are moved to face or shade the offensive guards. The nose tackle is removed for a defensive back. The purpose of this is to leave the four best pass rushers on the field in a long yardage situation. This is not the only adjustment that can be made. Bill Arnsparger would often remove linebackers from a 3–4 to create nickel and dime sets, replacing them with defensive backs.

== See also ==
- Dime defense
- 3–3–5 defense
