= Bobby Babich =

American football player and coach (born 1983)

Green Bay Packers
- Title: Secondary coach/pass game coordinator

Personal information
- Born: July 30, 1983 (age 43); Tulsa, Oklahoma, U.S.
- Listed height: 5 ft 10 in (1.78 m)
- Listed weight: 180 lb (82 kg)

Career information
- Position: Cornerback
- High school: Fargo South
- College: North Dakota State (2002–2005)

Career history
- Kent State (2006) Graduate assistant; Eastern Illinois (2007–2010) Secondary coach; Carolina Panthers (2011) Administrative assistant for the coaching staff; Carolina Panthers (2012) Defensive assistant; Cleveland Browns (2013–2014) Assistant defensive backs coach; Cleveland Browns (2015) Assistant secondary-Safeties; FIU (2016) Secondary coach & Defensive pass game coordinator; Buffalo Bills (2017) Assistant defensive backs coach; Buffalo Bills (2018–2021) Safeties coach; Buffalo Bills (2022–2023) Linebackers coach; Buffalo Bills (2024–2025) Defensive coordinator; Green Bay Packers (2026–present) Secondary coach/pass game coordinator

Bobby Babich (born July 30, 1983) is an American professional football coach and former player who is the secondary coach/pass game coordinator for the Green Bay Packers of the National Football League (NFL). He played college football for the North Dakota State Bison and previously served as a coach in various defensive roles with the Kent State Golden Flashes, Eastern Illinois Panthers, Carolina Panthers, Cleveland Browns, FIU Panthers, and Buffalo Bills, the latter of which he served as their defensive coordinator.

== Early life ==
Babich was born in Tulsa, Oklahoma, the son of football coach Bob Babich. He attended Fargo South High School in North Dakota where he played football and track and field, being a running back and cornerback in the former. He was selected first-team all-conference and first-team all-state as a senior in football and also received all-conference honors in track.

Babich played college football cornerback for the North Dakota State Bison, whom his father was the coach for. He totaled 10 tackles and an interception as a true freshman in 2002. He then started 10 games with 29 tackles as a sophomore in 2003, and had 22 tackles in 11 starts as a junior in 2004. He led the team in interceptions as a senior and ended his collegiate career having been named academic all-conference twice.

== Coaching career ==
=== Early career ===
A year after the end of his playing career, Babich entered coaching, serving as a graduate assistant with the Kent State Golden Flashes in 2006. One year later, he was hired by the Eastern Illinois Panthers as secondary coach. He served in this role through 2010.

Babich first entered the National Football League (NFL) in 2011, being hired by the Carolina Panthers to the role of administrative assistant to the coaching staff. In this role, he was an assistant to defensive backs and helped the team's day-to-day operations. This year was the first of four consecutive years when he had to face off against his father, who was at the time serving as the defensive coordinator for the Chicago Bears; Bob beat Bobby in all four "Babich Bowls". He received a promotion to defensive assistant in the 2012 season.

In 2013, Babich joined the Cleveland Browns and served through 2015 as an assistant defensive backs coach. He initially accepted a position as defensive coordinator and defensive backs coach for the Edinboro Fighting Scots in 2016, but then moved to the FIU Panthers as secondary coach and defensive pass game coordinator before the season started.

=== Buffalo Bills ===
In 2017, Babich was hired by the Buffalo Bills as assistant defensive backs coach under Sean McDermott, joining his father who was also on the team's staff. He helped in the development of Jordan Poyer and Micah Hyde, two of the best safeties in the league, and in 2017 helped Hyde earn a spot in the Pro Bowl while Tre'Davious White was the leader in rookie pass deflections. He received a promotion to safeties coach in 2018. USA Today noted that "all his groups performed admirably"; in 2020, he helped them reach the conference championship while being third in the league in takeaways, and in 2021 they had the top overall defense in the league, led in six major defensive categories, and both Hyde and Poyer were named All-Pro.

Babich was moved from safeties coach to linebackers coach in 2022, replacing his father who had retired. He worked with Pro Bowler Tremaine Edmunds and helped Matt Milano earn first-team All-Pro honors in his first year in his new position. The following year, after Edmunds left, Babich helped develop Terrel Bernard, who went from having seen little playing time in 2022 to being a top player in 2023. The team reached the AFC Divisional Round of the playoffs, with Bernard getting injured playing a role in their defeat by the Kansas City Chiefs.

After having been interviewed by other teams for defensive coordinator positions multiple times following the 2023 season, Babich was promoted by the Bills to serve in that capacity on January 30, 2024.

=== Green Bay Packers ===
The Bills chose not to retain Babich following the end of the 2025 season. Instead, he was hired as the next passing game coordinator for the Green Bay Packers on January 28, 2026.
