= Levi Wallace =

American football player (born 1995)

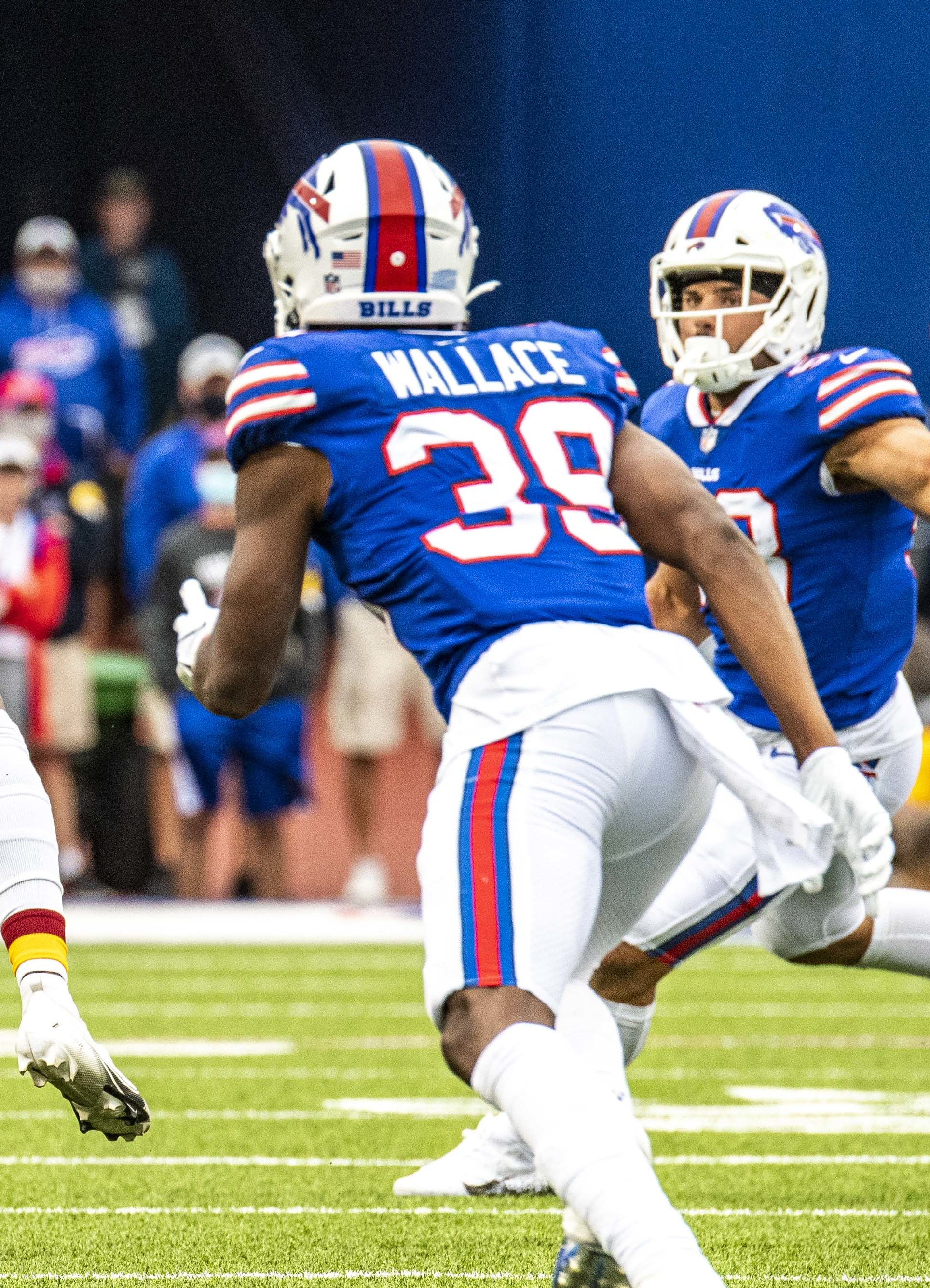
- Wallace with the Buffalo Bills in 2021

No. 39, 29
- Position: Cornerback

Personal information
- Born: June 12, 1995 (age 31); Tucson, Arizona, U.S.
- Listed height: 6 ft 0 in (1.83 m)
- Listed weight: 179 lb (81 kg)

Career information
- High school: Tucson
- College: Alabama (2014–2017)
- NFL draft: 2018: undrafted

Career history
- Buffalo Bills (2018–2021); Pittsburgh Steelers (2022–2023); Denver Broncos (2024); Jacksonville Jaguars (2025)*
- * Offseason or practice squad member only

Awards and highlights
- 2× CFP national champion (2015, 2017)

Career NFL statistics
- Total tackles: 333
- Fumble recoveries: 1
- Pass deflections: 56
- Interceptions: 12
- Stats at Pro Football Reference

Levi Wallace (born June 12, 1995) is an American former professional football player who was a cornerback in the National Football League (NFL). He played college football for the Alabama Crimson Tide, and signed with the Buffalo Bills as an undrafted free agent in 2018. He played in the NFL for the Bills, Pittsburgh Steelers, and Denver Broncos from 2018 to 2024.

== Early life ==
Wallace attended Tucson High School in Tucson, Arizona, where he played football and track and field. He received very little recruiting interest due to his slender frame, athletic limitations, and underwhelming statistical production as a wide receiver, cornerback, and kick returner. After receiving no scholarship offers, Wallace decided to attend the University of Alabama, as his father grew up in Tuscaloosa and was a fan of their football team. Wanting to stay involved in athletics, he played intramural flag football during his first semester in fall of 2013. He considered leaving the university after his first semester, as his father was suffering from ALS and in increasingly poor health. However, his father convinced him to try out for a spot on the Crimson Tide football team as a walk-on. Wallace agreed, and after a successful tryout in January 2014, he was granted a spot as a walk-on defensive back.

== College career ==
Wallace spent his first two seasons at Alabama on the scout team. He eventually earned a scholarship in Alabama’s fall camp in 2016. He played in 11 games, primarily on special teams and as a backup cornerback, recording 11 tackles and two pass breakups

During his senior year in 2017, following the departure of Marlon Humphrey to the NFL, Wallace started 14 games at cornerback. He was a starter during the 2018 College Football Playoff National Championship game, where Alabama won in overtime over Georgia, 26–23. Wallace totaled 48 tackles, two sacks, 18 pass breakups, and three interceptions (one returned for a touchdown) in his senior year.

== Professional career ==
Pre-draft measurables
Height	Weight	Arm length	Hand span	Wingspan	40-yard dash	10-yard split	20-yard split	20-yard shuttle	Three-cone drill	Vertical jump
6 ft 0 1/4 in (1.84 m)	179 lb (81 kg)	32 3/4 in (0.83 m)	9 3/8 in (0.24 m)	6 ft 5 3/8 in (1.97 m)	4.63 s	1.56 s	2.57 s	4.26 s	6.91 s	33.0 in (0.84 m)
All values from NFL Combine/Alabama’s Pro Day

=== Buffalo Bills ===
==== 2018 season ====
On May 1, 2018, the Buffalo Bills signed Wallace to a three-year, $1.71 million contract as an undrafted free agent. Throughout training camp, Wallace competed for a roster spot as a backup cornerback against Taron Johnson, Ryan Carter, Breon Borders, and Lafayette Pitts. On September 1, 2018, the Bills waived Wallace as part of their final roster cuts, but signed him to their practice squad the following day.

On November 6, 2018, the Bills promoted Wallace from their practice squad to the active roster after releasing Phillip Gaines. On November 11, 2018, Wallace made his professional regular season debut and first career start and made one tackle and a pass deflection during a 41–10 victory at the New York Jets in Week 10. In Week 16, he collected a season-high eight combined tackles during a 24–12 loss at the New England Patriots. He finished his rookie season in 2018 with 37 combined tackles (24 solo) and three pass deflections in seven games and seven starts.

==== 2019 season ====
Wallace was named a starting cornerback to begin the season, opposite Tre'Davious White. Following an inconsistent start to the season, Wallace eventually saw his playing time reduced in favor of Kevin Johnson. In week 15, Wallace caught his first career interception against the Pittsburgh Steelers on Sunday Night Football, picking off Devlin Hodges to seal a 17–10 Bills victory in the final moments to help Buffalo clinch a playoff berth. In the regular season finale against the Jets, Wallace logged another interception off Sam Darnold, but suffered a sprained ankle on the play, which kept him out of the Bills' playoff game against the Houston Texans. In the 2019 season, he started in all 16 games. He finished with 76 total tackles (66 solo), two interceptions, and nine passes defended.

==== 2020 season ====
On April 2, 2020, Wallace was re-signed to a one-year contract by the Bills, regaining his starting position despite the team signing veteran cornerback Josh Norman. In Week 3 against the Los Angeles Rams, Wallace recorded his first interception of the season during the 35–32 win. Wallace injured his ankle the following week against the Las Vegas Raiders and was ruled out the rest of the game. He was placed on injured reserve on October 7, 2020. He was activated on October 31. He was placed on the reserve/COVID-19 list on November 14, 2020, and activated on November 19. In Week 14 against the Steelers on Sunday Night Football, Wallace intercepted a pass thrown by Ben Roethlisberger late in the fourth quarter to secure a 26–15 win for the Bills. In the 2020 season, Wallace appeared in 12 games, all starts. He finished with 48 total tackles, two interceptions, and eight passes defended.

In the Divisional Round of the playoffs against the Baltimore Ravens, Wallace recorded one sack on Lamar Jackson during the 17–3 win.

==== 2021 season ====
Wallace re-signed with the Bills on a one-year contract on March 26, 2021. He became the top cornerback on the roster after White suffered a torn ACL in week 12 and missed the rest of the season, but Buffalo still finished the year with the league's top passing defense despite White's injury. Wallace, in particular, allowed just a 72.6 passer rating when targeted by opposing quarterbacks. In the 2021 season, Wallace started all 17 regular season games and both of the Bills' postseason games. He finished with 58 total tackles, two interceptions, and ten passes defended.

=== Pittsburgh Steelers ===
On March 17, 2022, the Steelers signed Wallace to a two-year, $8 million contract that includes a signing bonus of $2.96 million. In the 2022 season, he appeared in 15 games and started nine. He finished with 48 total tackles, a career-high four interceptions, and 13 passes defended.

=== Denver Broncos ===
On April 22, 2024, the Denver Broncos signed Wallace to a one-year contract. While filling in for an injured Riley Moss in Week 13 against the Cleveland Browns, Wallace struggled against former Broncos receiver Jerry Jeudy who recorded nine catches for 235 yards and a touchdown, the majority of which occurred with Wallace in coverage. This led to Wallace being benched in favor of rookie Kris Abrams-Draine in the 4th quarter.

On December 24, Wallace was waived by the Broncos.

=== Jacksonville Jaguars ===
On August 2, 2025, the Jacksonville Jaguars signed Wallace. He was placed on injured reserve on August 9, and released on August 13.

On July 17, 2026, Wallace retired from professional football.
