= Tre'Davious White =

American football player (born 1995)

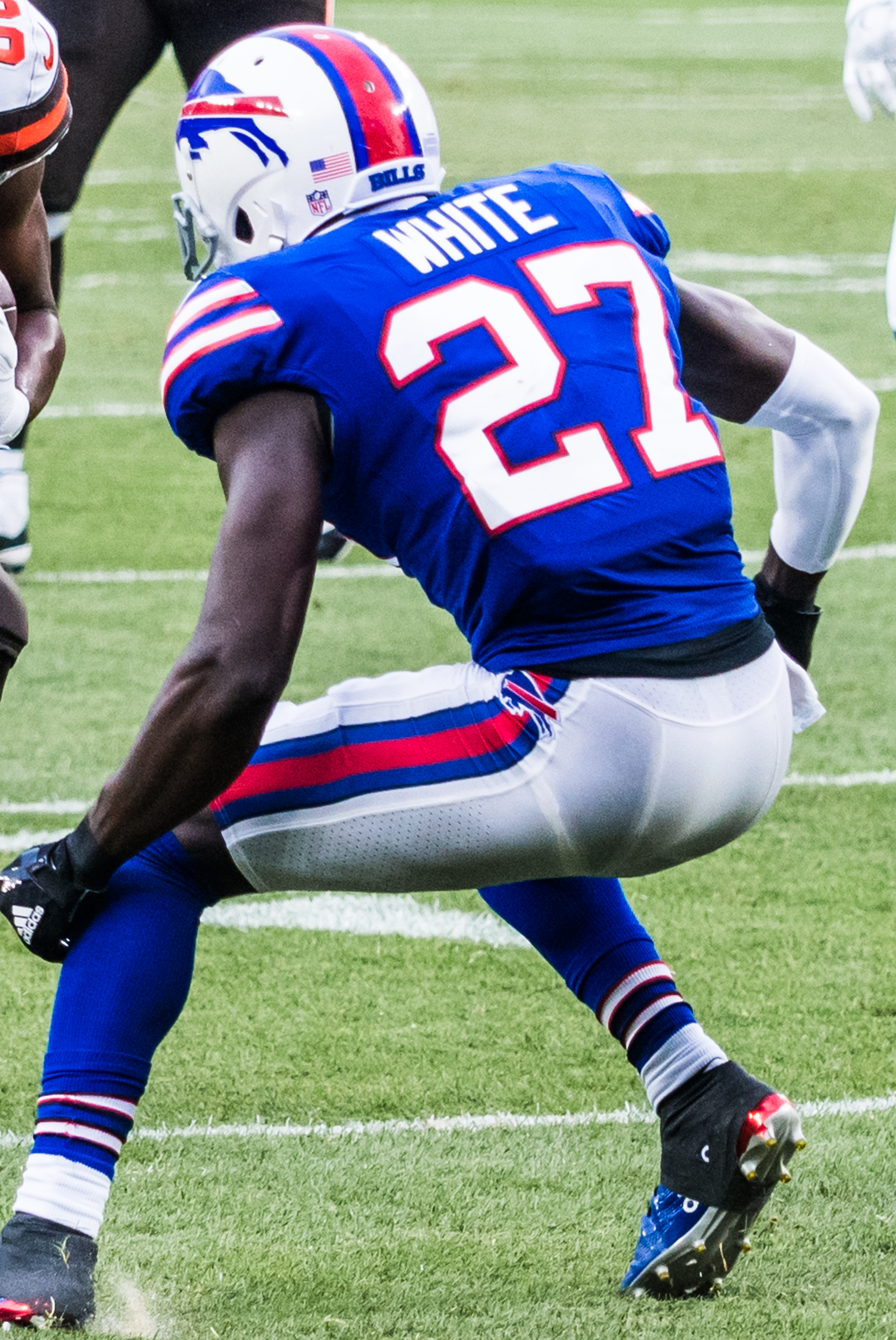
- White with the Buffalo Bills in 2018

No. 27 – Buffalo Bills
- Position: Cornerback
- Roster status: Practice squad

Personal information
- Born: January 16, 1995 (age 31); Shreveport, Louisiana, U.S.
- Listed height: 5 ft 11 in (1.80 m)
- Listed weight: 192 lb (87 kg)

Career information
- High school: Green Oaks (Shreveport)
- College: LSU (2013–2016)
- NFL draft: 2017: 1st round, 27th overall pick

Career history
- Buffalo Bills (2017–2023); Los Angeles Rams (2024); Baltimore Ravens (2024); Buffalo Bills (2025–present)

Awards and highlights
- First-team All-Pro (2019); Second-team All-Pro (2020); 2× Pro Bowl (2019, 2020); NFL interceptions co-leader (2019); PFWA All-Rookie Team (2017); Consensus All-American (2016); First-team All-SEC (2016); Second-team All-SEC (2015)

Career NFL statistics as of Week 11, 2026
- Total tackles: 373
- Forced fumbles: 5
- Fumble recoveries: 5
- Pass deflections: 84
- Interceptions: 19
- Defensive touchdowns: 1
- Stats at Pro Football Reference

Tre'Davious White Sr. (born January 16, 1995) is an American professional football cornerback for the Buffalo Bills of the National Football League (NFL). He played college football for the LSU Tigers, earning consensus All-American as a senior in 2016. He was selected by the Buffalo Bills in the first round of the 2017 NFL draft. Since earning a starting position as a rookie, White became one of the league's top cornerbacks as part of a resurgent Bills defense, having garnered two Pro Bowl selections and All-Pro honors. Following three injury-riddled seasons and his subsequent release, White signed with the Los Angeles Rams and was traded to the Baltimore Ravens at the trade deadline in 2024, before returning to the Bills in 2025.

== Early life ==
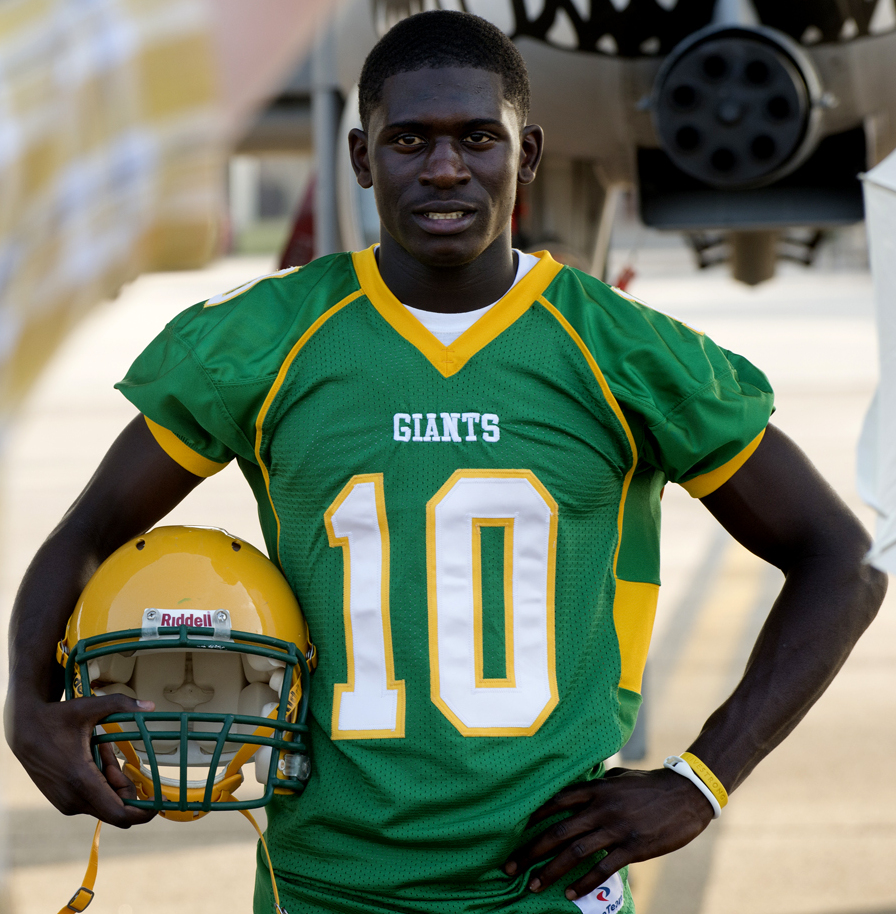
White as a Green Oaks High School student in 2012

White attended Green Oaks High School in Shreveport, Louisiana. He played both cornerback and quarterback. He was rated by Rivals.com as a five-star recruit and was ranked as the fourth best cornerback and 18th best overall player in his class. White committed to Louisiana State University (LSU) to play college football under head coach Les Miles.

== College career ==
White stated that he originally committed to LSU as a wide receiver, but that he chose to remain a defensive back when he realized he was unlikely to see significant playing time on a roster that included future NFL stars Odell Beckham Jr. and Jarvis Landry. As a true freshman at LSU, White played in 13 games with 11 starts. He finished the season with 55 tackles and two interceptions. As a sophomore in 2014 he started all 13 games and also served as the punt returner. He recorded 33 tackles, two interceptions and a punt return touchdown. As a junior, he was chosen to wear the No. 18 Jersey, which signifies the player with the best leadership qualities on the team. He finished the year with 44 tackles and returned a punt 69 yards for a touchdown against Syracuse. The Associated Press and Southeastern Conference (SEC) coaches both selected White for their All-SEC second team. White was expected to be a late first-round choice in the 2016 NFL draft, but he instead chose to return to LSU for his senior season. After the season, he earned first-team All-SEC honors from the AP. He was also a consensus All-American, earning first-team honors from the American Football Coaches Association and Walter Camp Football Foundation.

== Professional career ==
=== Pre-draft ===
White was invited to the Senior Bowl and was set to play until he injured his ankle during practice. He was able to raise his draft stock after practicing well and showing an ability to learn quickly while working with Cleveland Browns defensive backs coach DeWayne Walker for the Senior Bowl. He attended the NFL Combine and was able to complete all the combine and positional drills.

External videos
- Tre'Davious White's NFL Combine Workout
- Tre'Davious White's 40-yard dash
- NFL Draft Profile: Tre'Davious White

White also participated at LSU's Pro Day and opted to attempt to beat his combine times in the 40, 20, and 10-yard dash, but was unable to. NFL draft experts and analysts projected him to be selected in the first or second round. He was ranked the third best cornerback in the draft by Sports Illustrated, Pro Football Focus, and ESPN, ranked the fourth best cornerback by NFL analyst Bucky Brooks, ranked the fifth best cornerback by NFL analyst Mike Mayock, and ranked the seventh best cornerback by DraftScout.com.

"He was a four-year starter in the SEC, so that tells you something. He's not flashy or sexy, but he's one of the more solid cornerbacks in this draft. He plays off, he plays inside, he plays soft, he plays press. Even though we don't talk about him like other players in this draft, he's still a good football player.”

— Mike Mayock (NFL draft analyst)

Pre-draft measurables
Height	Weight	Arm length	Hand span	Wingspan	40-yard dash	10-yard split	20-yard split	20-yard shuttle	Three-cone drill	Vertical jump	Broad jump	Bench press
5 ft 11 1/4 in (1.81 m)	192 lb (87 kg)	32 1/8 in (0.82 m)	9 1/8 in (0.23 m)	6 ft 3 3/4 in (1.92 m)	4.47 s	1.52 s	2.61 s	4.32 s	6.90 s	32.0 in (0.81 m)	9 ft 11 in (3.02 m)	16 reps
All values are from NFL Combine

=== Buffalo Bills (first stint) ===
The Buffalo Bills selected White in the first round (27th overall) of the 2017 NFL draft. He was the fifth cornerback drafted in 2017.

External videos
- Bills draft Tre'Davious White 27th overall
- Tre'Davious White gets selected in Round 1

"We felt good about the pick with Tre’Davious White. Solid person, solid football player, we felt like if we could get him it would be a good pick for us and there he was at 27. He’s versatile, plays inside, outside, and he’s also a returner so there’s special teams value, so we feel good about it.”

— Sean McDermott (Bills' Head coach)

==== 2017 ====
On May 18, 2017, the Bills signed White to a four–year, $10.09 million contract that includes $7.78 million guaranteed and a signing bonus of $5.47 million.

He entered training camp as the de facto No. 1 starting cornerback due to the departures of Stephon Gilmore, Ronald Darby, and Nickell Robey-Coleman. Head coach Sean McDermott named White the No. 1 starting cornerback on the Bills' depth chart to start the regular season, alongside E. J. Gaines.

On September 10, 2017, White made his professional regular season debut and first career start in the Buffalo Bills' season-opener against the New York Jets, recording four solo tackles and two pass deflections in Bills' 21–12 victory. On September 24, 2017, White recorded a season–high seven combined tackles (six solo), a season–high four pass deflections, and made his first career interception off a pass thrown by Trevor Siemian to wide receiver Bennie Fowler during a 26–16 victory against the Denver Broncos in Week 3. He was named the NFL Defensive Rookie of the Month for September. In Week 4, he made four combined tackles (three solo), a pass deflection, and recovered a fumble by quarterback Matt Ryan after it was forced during a sack by defensive end Jerry Hughes and returned it 52–yards for his first career touchdown during the second quarter of a 23–17 upset win over the Atlanta Falcons. On October 22, 2017, White made one solo tackle on wide receiver Adam Humphries, which caused a fumble that he recovered late in the fourth quarter to set up the Bills' game–winning field goal during their 30–27 victory against the Tampa Bay Buccaneers. On November 26, 2017, White recorded one solo tackle, broke up a pass, and intercepted a pass thrown by quarterback Alex Smith to wide receiver Tyreek Hill and returned it 63–yards with 1:28 left in the fourth quarter to seal a 16–10 victory at the Kansas City Chiefs. The following week the Bills played against the New England Patriots, while White made five combined tackles (four solo), a pass deflection, and intercepted a pass by Tom Brady intended for tight end Rob Gronkowski during a 23–3 loss. Immediately after the play, Gronkowski dive into White elbow-first while he was grounded and drew a personal foul. White suffered a concussion as a result of the hit, while Gronkowski was upset and claimed that White should have been flagged for a pass interference penalty, but nonetheless was suspended one game for the hit. He started in all 16 games as a rookie in 2017 and recorded 69 combined tackles (53 solo), 18 pass deflections, and four interceptions. Pro Football Focus gave White an overall grade of 91.6, which ranked third among all qualifying cornerbacks in 2017. White was a finalist for 2017 Defensive Rookie of the Year award, but lost to Marshon Lattimore of the New Orleans Saints. He was named to the PFWA All-Rookie Team.

The Buffalo Bills finished the 2017 NFL season second in the AFC East with a 9–7 record, clinching a wild-card berth, their first playoff appearance since 1999. On January 7, 2018, White started in his first career playoff game and recorded one tackle and a pass deflection as the Bills lost 10–3 in the AFC Wild Card Game against the Jacksonville Jaguars.

==== 2018 ====
He returned as the No. 1 starting cornerback remaining under defensive coordinator Leslie Frazier and was paired with newly acquired free agent signing Vontae Davis. In Week 4, he recorded five solo tackles and a season–high three pass deflections as the Bills were shutout at the Green Bay Packers 0–27. On October 29, 2018, he racked up a season–high eight combined tackles (six solo) and made one pass deflection during a 6–25 loss to the New England Patriots. In Week 9, White made three combined tackles (two solo), deflected a pass, and intercepted a pass by quarterback Mitchell Trubisky and returned it for 37–yards in the 41–9 loss to the Chicago Bears. He finished the 2018 season with 54 combined tackles, 8 passes defensed, and two interceptions as the Bills finished with the number one ranked pass defense.

==== 2019 ====
Head coach Sean McDermott named White and Levi Wallace the starting cornerbacks to begin the regular season. On September 22, 2019, White made two solo tackles, two pass deflections, and a career-high two interceptions on passes thrown by Andy Dalton during a 21–17 win against the Cincinnati Bengals. In Week 7, he made five combined tackles (four solo), a pass deflection, and caused two crucial turnovers, intercepting Ryan Fitzpatrick at the Buffalo two–yard line and also forcing receiver Preston Williams to fumble at Miami's 30–yard line, as the Bills scored off of both turnovers during a 31–21 win against the Miami Dolphins. He was named the AFC Defensive Player of the Week for his performance.

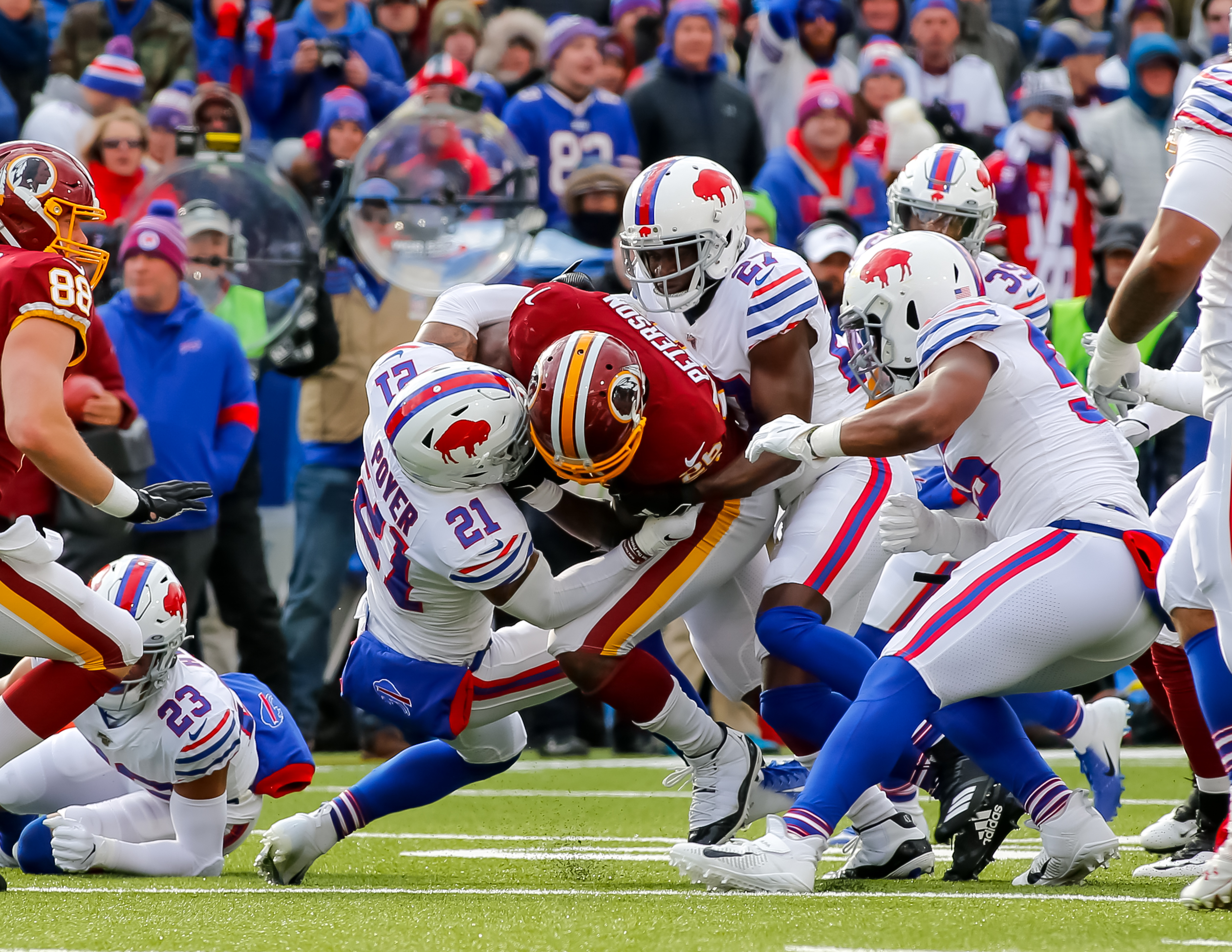
White and teammates bringing down Adrian Peterson in a game against the Washington Redskins

In Week 9, White made four combined tackles (three solo) and recorded his first career sack on rookie quarterback Dwayne Haskins for a nine–yard loss as the Bills routes the Washington Redskins 24–9. In Week 12, White recorded three solo tackles, a career–high four pass deflections, and intercepted a pass thrown by Brandon Allen during a 20–3 win against the Denver Broncos. On December 15, 2019, White recorded four combined tackles (three solo), two pass deflections, and made two interceptions off pass attempts by Devlin Hodges, setting a career–high six interceptions in a season, to help the Bills on Sunday Night Football win 17–10 at the Pittsburgh Steelers. On December 17, 2019, it was announced that White earned the first Pro Bowl invite of his career. Despite sitting out Week 17 to rest for the playoffs, White still finished as a co-leader with six interceptions in 2019 and did not allow a single touchdown reception by opponents throughout the season. He finished with a total of 58 combined tackles (48 solo), 17 pass deflections, a career–high five interceptions, and one sack in 15 games and 15 starts.

The Buffalo Bills finished the 2019 NFL season second in the AFC East with a 10–6 record to clinch a Wildcard berth. On January 4, 2020, White was matched up against Texans' receiver DeAndre Hopkins and made five combined tackles (four solo) and a forced fumble on Hopkins, recovered by teammate Tremaine Edmunds, during a 22–19 overtime loss at the Houston Texans in the Wildcard Game. He was ranked 47th by his fellow players on the NFL Top 100 Players of 2020.

==== 2020 ====
On April 23, 2020, the Buffalo Bills exercised the fifth–year option on White's rookie contract for one–year, $10.24 million. He returned as the No. 1 starting cornerback and was paired with newly acquired free agent Josh Norman.

On September 5, 2020, the Buffalo Bills signed White to a four–year, $69.00 million contract extension that included $55.25 million guaranteed, $36.70 million guaranteed upon signing, and an initial signing bonus of $10.50 million, keeping him under contract through the 2025 season. The contract made him the highest-paid defensive back in the league at the time.

In Week 4, he collected a season–high eight combined tackles (six solo) and broke up a pass during a 30–23 win at the Las Vegas Raiders. Prior to Week 5, White had a back injury flare up and subsequently missed a Week 5 loss at the Tennessee Titans. On November 8, 2020, White recorded seven combined tackles (six solo), made a pass deflection, recovered a fumble by Russell Wilson that was forced by teammate Jerry Hughes, and intercepted a pass by Wilson in the fourth quarter during a 44–34 victory against the Seattle Seahawks. On November 29, 2020, he tied his season–high of eight combined tackles (four solo), made a season–high two pass deflections, and had his second consecutive game with an interception after picking off a pass thrown by Justin Herbert to tight end Hunter Henry as the Bills defeated the Los Angeles Chargers 27–17. In Week 15, White had three solo tackles, a pass deflection, and forced a fumble while sacking quarterback Drew Lock that was recovered by Jerry Hughes and then was returned for a 21–yard touchdown during a 48–19 win at the Denver Broncos. Head coach Sean McDermott opted to rest his starters, including White, during the Bills' Week 17 victory against the Miami Dolphins, to have them rested heading into the playoffs. He finished the 2020 season with 57 combined tackles (44 solo), 11 pass deflections, two fumble recoveries, three interceptions, 1.5 sacks, and a forced fumble in 14 games and 14 starts. He was named a second-team All-Pro and was invited to the 2021 Pro Bowl following the season's conclusion. He was ranked 95th by his fellow players on the NFL Top 100 Players of 2021.

==== 2021 ====
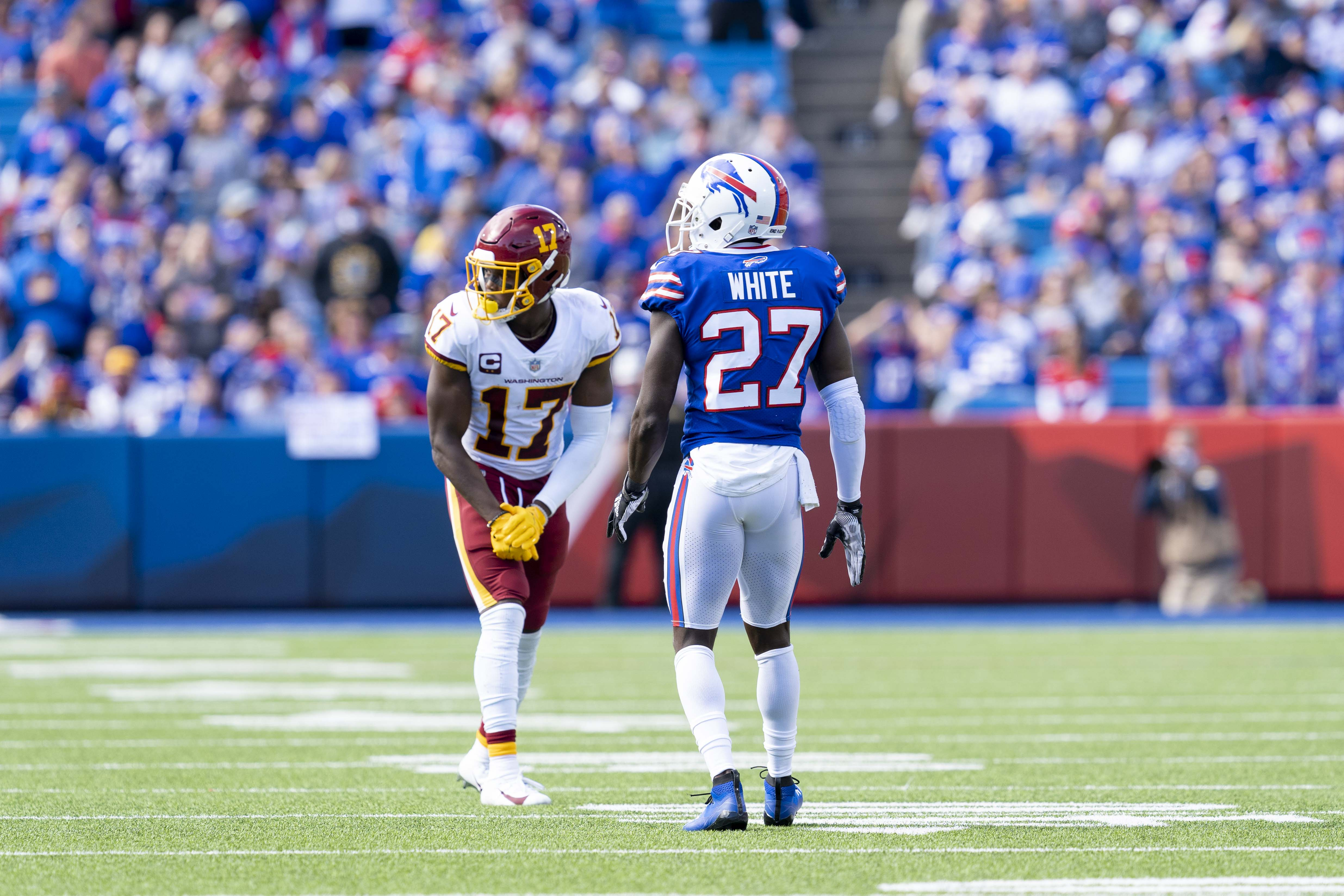
White lined up on Terry McLaurin against Washington in 2021

Head coach Sean McDermott retained White as the No. 1 starting cornerback and paired him with Levi Wallace. On September 19, 2021, White racked up a season–high eight combined tackles (six solo) and had a pass deflection during a 35–0 victory at the Miami Dolphins. On November 14, 2021, he recorded five combined tackles (three solo), broke up a pass, and had his only interception of the season on a pass by Mike White to wide receiver Elijah Moore during a 45–17 win at the New York Jets.

On November 25, 2021, White made one pass deflection before suffering a non-contact injury and exiting during the second quarter of a 31–6 win at the New Orleans Saints during a Thanksgiving. The following day, it was revealed that he had torn his ACL and was ruled out for the rest of the season. On November 30, 2021, the Buffalo Bills officially placed him on injured reserve and he subsequently missed the last six games (Weeks 13–18). He completed the season with a total of 41 combined tackles (27 solo), six pass deflections, one forced fumble, a fumble recovery, one interception, and was credited with half a sack in 11 games and 11 starts.

==== 2022 ====
He underwent surgery and was still recovering at the start of training camp and noted that the injury was the first time since middle school that he, a three-sport athlete in high school, had been sedentary, and briefly fell into depression; he eventually was coaxed out by his former LSU teammates, Bills teammates and reporter Michele Tafoya, a personal friend; he purposely chose to slow-walk his injury recovery in deference to the training staff's decisions. On August 30, 2022, the Buffalo Bills placed him on the physically unable to perform list and he missed the first seven games of the regular season.

On November 1, 2022, the Buffalo Bills activated him off injured reserve and placed him on the active roster. On November 24, 2022, White made his return to play for the Thanksgiving game—52 weeks to the day of his injury. He was limited to the first two drives before leaving the Bills' 28–25 win at the Detroit Lions, as part of the coaching staff's limited phase-in plan for White's return. In Week 15, he made three solo tackles and a season–high three pass deflections during a 32–29 win against the Miami Dolphins. On December 24, 2022, White collected a season–high five combined tackles (four solo) and made a pass deflection during a 35–13 win at the Chicago Bears. He finished with 20 combined tackles (16 solo), six pass deflections, and one interception in six games and six starts.

==== 2023 ====
Defensive coordinator Leslie Frazier opted to step away from coaching for at least the 2023 season. Head coach Sean McDermott took over his duties as defensive coordinator and retained White as the No. 1 starting cornerback and was paired with Christian Benford.

On September 24, 2023, White tied his season-high of three solo tackles, made a pass deflection, and had his lone interception of the season on a pass thrown by Sam Howell to wide receiver Curtis Samuel as the Bills routed the Washington Commanders 37–3. The following week, White recorded three solo tackles and deflected a pass before exiting in the third quarter of a 48–20 win against the Miami Dolphins after suffering a non-contact lower leg injury. The next day, the team announced he had torn his Achilles tendon and would miss the remainder of the season. On October 7, 2023, the Buffalo Bills officially placed White on injured reserve where he missed the last 13 games (Weeks 5–18) of the 2023 NFL season. He was limited to 12 combined tackles (ten solo), two pass deflections, and one interception in four games and four starts.

==== 2024 ====
On March 13, 2024, White was released by the Bills. He was designated a post-June 1 cut, though allowed to sign with any team once the league year began.

=== Los Angeles Rams ===
On March 26, 2024, the Los Angeles Rams signed White to a one–year, $4.25 million contract that includes $3.25 million guaranteed and an initial signing bonus of $1.75 million and can be worth up to $10 million with incentives.

White was still recovering from undergoing surgery to repair his Achilles tendon and the Rams planned to slowly have him begin practicing while he recovered. Their plans immediately changed following Darious Williams sustaining a hamstring injury and White was instantly put back into preparations to start the season.

He entered training camp slated as the No. 1 starting cornerback under defensive coordinator Chris Shula after the Rams did not re-sign Ahkello Witherspoon and was paired with Darious Williams. Head coach Sean McVay named White and Cobie Durant the starting cornerbacks to begin the season after Williams suffered a hamstring injury. On September 8, 2024, he started in the Los Angeles Rams' season–opener at the Detroit Lions and collected a season–high five combined tackles (three solo) during a 20–26 overtime loss. Head coach Sean McVay benched White as a healthy scratch after Week 4 and he never played another snap for the Rams, missing the next four games (Weeks 5–9) until they found a trade partner. His signing by the Rams was said to be a "huge flop" by NFL analysts and reporters.

=== Baltimore Ravens ===
On November 5, 2024, White along with a seventh-round pick in the 2027 NFL draft was traded to the Baltimore Ravens for a seventh-round pick in the 2026 NFL draft. Head coach John Harbaugh named White the fourth cornerback on the depth chart upon his arrival. He was listed on the depth chart behind starting cornerbacks Marlon Humphrey and Brandon Stephens, as well as rookie first-round pick Nate Wiggins. He finished his stint with the Ravens with only ten combined tackles (seven solo) and three pass deflections in seven games without a start.

=== Buffalo Bills (second stint) ===
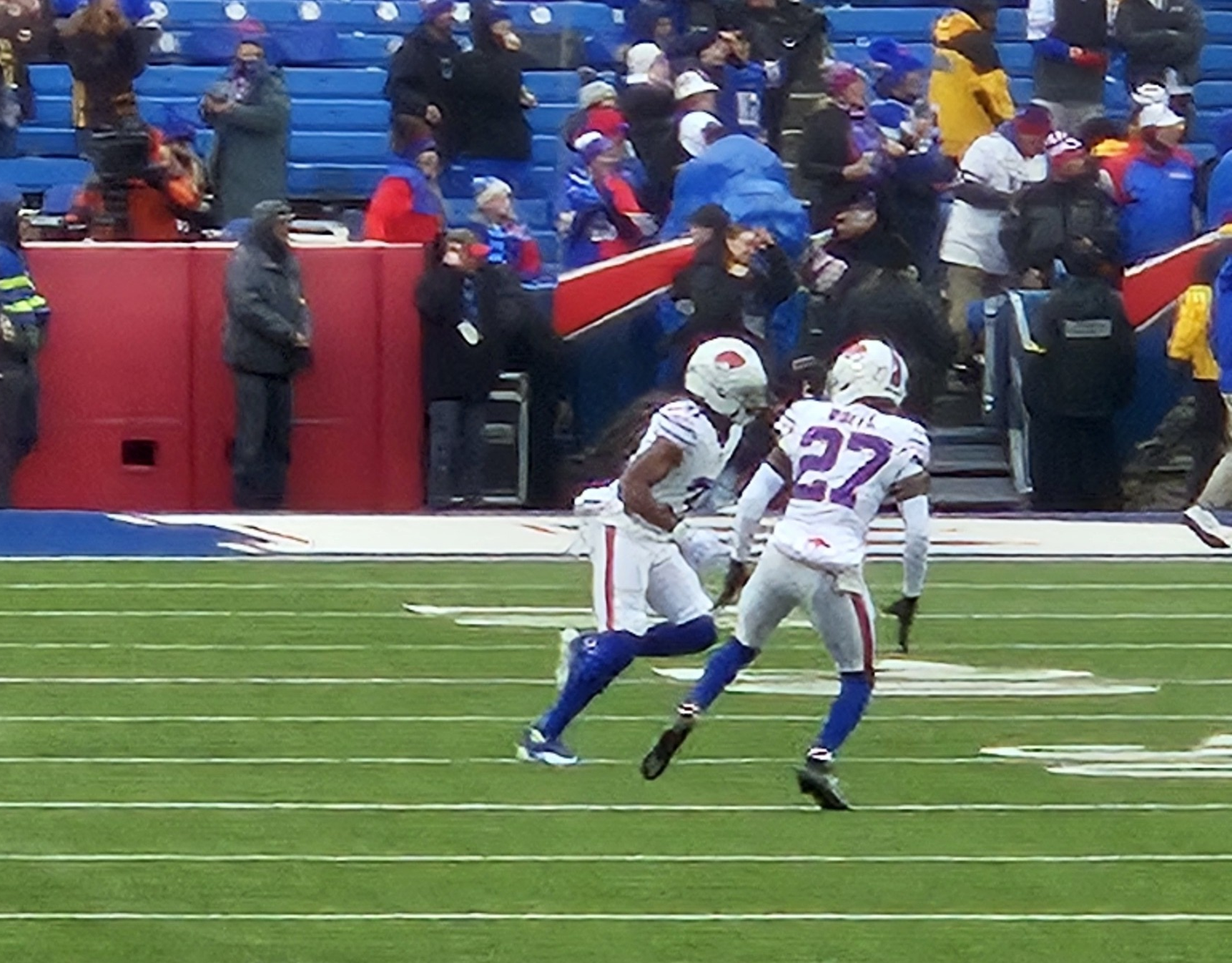
White (#27) warming up with teammate Maxwell Hairston (#31) before a game against the Tampa Bay Buccaneers in 2025

On April 17, 2025, the Buffalo Bills signed White to a one-year, $6.8 million contract. Intended to be a mentor and backup to first-round draft pick Maxwell Hairston, White was forced to start early in the season due to injuries to Hairston and other Bills cornerbacks. His play was described as "underperforming" due to his "sapped" athleticism at this point of his career and a preseason groin injury, allowing a 117 passer rating when targeted through the first six games of the season. Once Hairston was activated, White and Hairston began alternating playing time with one another, though the former continued to start and out-snapped the latter against the Pittsburgh Steelers as Buffalo's pass defense improved as a whole in the second half of the season. He finished the 2025 season with 40 tackles, one interception, and ten passes defended.

White had a successful game in the Bills' wild card round playoff game against the Jacksonville Jaguars; he deflected three passes by Jacksonville quarterback Trevor Lawrence, including a key deflection into the hands of teammate Cole Bishop to seal the Bills' victory in the game.

White's second playoff game of the 2025 season was not as successful. In their divisional round game against the Denver Broncos, in overtime on 2nd and 7 in their own territory, Broncos quarterback Bo Nix fired a deep pass to Marvin Mims, which fell incomplete. However, White, who was guarding Mims, was flagged for a crucial defensive pass interference, which gave the Broncos 30 yards and set them up on the Bills' 8-yard line. On the subsequent play, White, unhappy about the previous call, was flagged again for unsportmanlike conduct as the Broncos kicked a field goal to win a thrilling 33–30 overtime victory. White would finish with 4 tackles and no pass deflections or interceptions.

After beginning the 2026 season as a free agent, White re-signed with the Bills on October 19, 2026, initially as a member of the practice squad.

== NFL career statistics ==
Legend
	Led the league
**Bold**	Career high

=== Regular season ===
Year	Team	Games		Tackles				Interceptions						Fumbles	
Year	Team	GP	GS	Cmb	Solo	Ast	Sck	PD	Int	Yds	Avg	Lng	TD	FF	FR
2017	BUF	16	16	**69**	**53**	**16**	0.0	**18**	4	**86**	**21.5**	**63**	0	1	**2**
2018	BUF	16	16	54	44	10	0.0	8	2	37	18.5	37	0	0	0
2019	BUF	15	15	58	48	10	1.0	17	**6**	57	9.5	49	0	**2**	0
2020	BUF	14	14	57	44	13	**1.5**	11	3	28	9.3	28	0	1	**2**
2021	BUF	11	11	41	27	14	0.5	6	1	0	0.0	0	0	1	1
2022	BUF	6	6	20	16	4	0.0	6	1	0	0.0	0	0	0	0
2023	BUF	4	4	12	10	2	0.0	2	1	2	2.0	2	0	0	0
2024	LAR	4	4	12	9	3	0.0	2	0	0	0.0	0	0	0	0
2024	BAL	7	0	10	7	3	0.0	3	0	0	0.0	0	0	0	0
2025	BUF	16	16	40	29	11	0.0	10	1	0	0.0	0	0	0	0
2026	BUF	1	0	0	0	0	0.0	1	0	0	0.0	0	0	0	0
Total		110	102	373	287	86	3.0	84	19	210	11.1	63	0	5	5

=== Postseason ===
Year	Team	Games		Tackles				Interceptions						Fumbles	
Year	Team	GP	GS	Cmb	Solo	Ast	Sck	PD	Int	Yds	Avg	Lng	TD	FF	FR
2017	BUF	1	1	1	0	1	0.0	1	0	0	0.0	0	0	0	0
2019	BUF	1	1	5	4	1	0.0	0	0	0	0.0	0	0	**1**	0
2020	BUF	3	3	**20**	**14**	**6**	0.0	2	0	0	0.0	0	0	0	0
2021	BUF	0	0	Did not play due to injury											
2022	BUF	2	2	6	4	2	0.0	2	0	0	0.0	0	0	0	0
2023	BUF	0	0	Did not play due to injury											
2024	BAL	2	0	1	1	0	0.0	0	0	0	0.0	0	0	0	0
2025	BUF	2	2	6	5	1	0.0	**3**	0	0	0.0	0	0	0	0
Total		11	9	39	28	11	0.0	8	0	0	0.0	0	0	1	0

== Personal life ==
White is married with two children. His eldest, son Tre'Davious Jr., was born shortly after he was selected.

In 2018, as part of a cross-promotion between Pegula Sports and Entertainment sports properties, White appeared in a commercial for the fictional "Tre White Goalie Academy" promoting White's effort to be elected to a Pro Bowl. The commercial became a sort of running gag for White, who notes the similarities between the goaltender and defensive back positions in that both serve as a last line of defense against scoring, and that there were no collegiate hockey teams in Louisiana (White had been a track and basketball star during football offseason in high school). White became a fan of Buffalo Sabres goaltender Carter Hutton (whom White mock-mistakenly called "Sutton" in the video) as a result of making the commercial, having otherwise largely been unaware of hockey before joining the Bills. In White's first Sunday Night Football appearance in 2019, White identified his alma mater as the Tre White Goalie Academy during on-screen introductions; White subsequently caught two interceptions in the game, playing a major role in the Bills' playoff-clinching win.
