= Sean McDermott =

American football coach (born 1974)

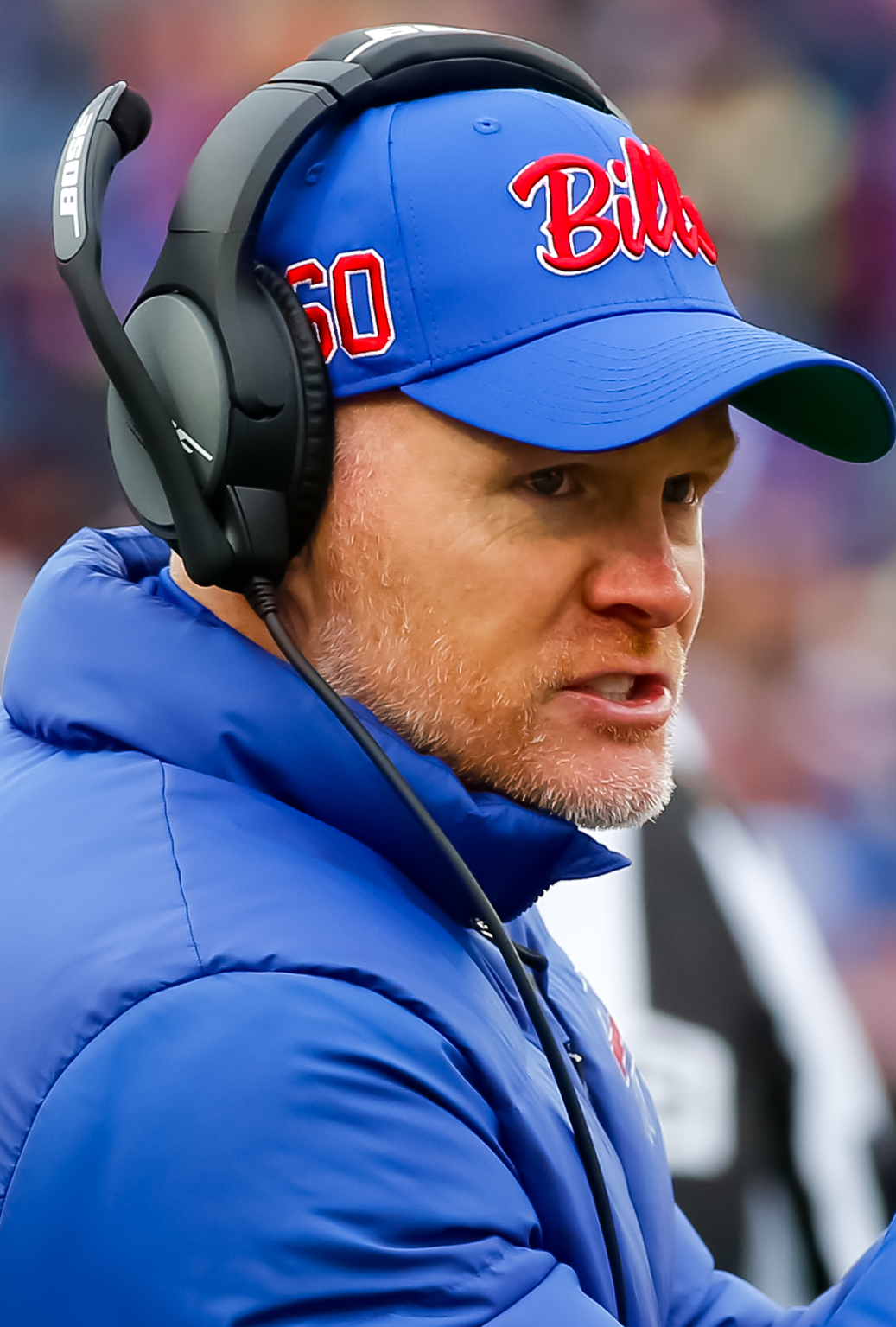
- McDermott with the Buffalo Bills in 2019

Personal information
- Born: March 21, 1974 (age 52); Omaha, Nebraska, U.S.

Career information
- Position: Safety
- High school: La Salle College (Wyndmoor, Pennsylvania)
- College: William & Mary (1993–1997)

Career history

Coaching
- William & Mary (1998) Graduate assistant; Philadelphia Eagles (2001–2010); Assistant to head coach (2001); Defensive assistant & quality control (2002–2003); Assistant defensive backs coach (2004–2006); Linebackers coach (2007); Defensive backs coach (2008); Defensive coordinator & defensive backs coach (2009–2010); Carolina Panthers (2011–2016) Defensive coordinator; Buffalo Bills (2017–2025) Head coach

Operations
- Philadelphia Eagles (1999–2000) Scouting administrative coordinator

Awards and highlights
- As a head coach: Greasy Neale Award (2024)

Head coaching record
- Regular season: 98–50 (.662)
- Postseason: 8–8 (.500)
- Career: 106–58 (.646)
- Coaching profile at Pro Football Reference

Sean Michael McDermott (born March 21, 1974) is an American professional football coach who served most recently as the head coach for the Buffalo Bills of the National Football League from 2017 to 2025. He began his NFL coaching career as an assistant for the Philadelphia Eagles in 2001, serving as defensive coordinator from 2009 to 2010, and was later the defensive coordinator of the Carolina Panthers from 2011 to 2016. Following his six seasons with the Panthers, which included an appearance in Super Bowl 50, McDermott was hired as the Bills' head coach in 2017.

McDermott's nine seasons with Buffalo saw improved fortunes for the franchise, which had been mostly unsuccessful during the 2000s and 2010s. In his first season, he led the Bills to their first playoff appearance since 1999, ending the longest active postseason drought in the four major North American sports. Three years later, McDermott helped the Bills clinch their division and win a playoff game for the first time since 1995 en route to their first AFC Championship Game appearance since 1993. He led Buffalo to eight playoff appearances (including seven consecutive), five consecutive division titles, and two AFC Championship Game appearances. McDermott was less successful in the postseason and was unable to reach the Super Bowl, leading to his firing after the 2025 season.

== Early life ==
Born in Omaha, Nebraska, McDermott grew up in the Philadelphia suburbs. His family lived in West Chester and Paoli before settling in Lansdale when McDermott was in the second grade. McDermott first attended North Penn High School before transferring to La Salle College High School, where he played football. He was named All-Southeastern Pennsylvania at defensive back in 1992 and graduated in 1993. McDermott was also a national prep champion wrestler in 1992 and 1993.

McDermott received a bachelor's degree in finance while at the College of William and Mary, where he was an all-conference safety (1997). McDermott was teammates with future Pittsburgh Steelers head coach Mike Tomlin, who was a wide receiver and faced McDermott frequently. He also received Academic all-conference honors in 1996 and 1997 and NSCA Strength and Conditioning All-America accolades.

== Coaching career ==
=== Philadelphia Eagles ===
McDermott originally joined the Philadelphia Eagles in 1999 as a scouting administrative coordinator, a position he held until being promoted to Andy Reid's coaching staff in 2001. He became defensive quality control coach and later assistant defensive backs coach. In 2004, McDermott helped replace Steve Spagnuolo by serving as assistant defensive backs coach, as Spagnuolo was assigned the linebackers coach position. That same year, McDermott saw both of his starting safeties (Brian Dawkins and Michael Lewis) earn Pro Bowl berths for the first time in team history. McDermott and the Eagles appeared in Super Bowl XXXIX that season but lost to the New England Patriots, who won their second straight Super Bowl title. Under McDermott's watch, Dawkins went on to earn two more Pro Bowl berths following the 2005 and 2006 seasons.

In 2007, McDermott was assigned linebackers coach, after Spagnuolo had left to take the defensive coordinator job for the New York Giants. On January 28, 2008, Eagles head coach Andy Reid named McDermott as the secondary coach.

On May 18, 2009, McDermott was named the interim defensive coordinator as a result of defensive coordinator Jim Johnson's medical leave of absence. Two months later on July 24, due to the continuing decline of Johnson, the Eagles announced McDermott would take over as full-time defensive coordinator. Johnson died four days later. Thanks in part to what he learned under Johnson, McDermott would go on to implement a variety of blitzes in his later defensive gameplans.

McDermott was fired as the defensive coordinator on January 15, 2011, after 12 years with the Eagles.

=== Carolina Panthers ===
McDermott was hired as the defensive coordinator of the Carolina Panthers on January 17, 2011. He was reunited with new Panthers head coach Ron Rivera, a former Eagles assistant whom McDermott served alongside from 1999 to 2003. McDermott was Pro Football Focus's second runner up to their Defensive Coordinator of the Year award in 2015.

As the Panthers' defensive coordinator, McDermott led the team to finishes in the top ten in overall defense from 2012 to 2015.

In the 2015 season, McDermott and the Panthers reached Super Bowl 50, which was played on February 7, 2016. His defense only gave up one offensive touchdown in the game, but the Panthers lost to the Denver Broncos by a score of 24–10.

=== Buffalo Bills ===
==== 2017 season ====
On January 11, 2017, McDermott was hired by the Buffalo Bills as the 19th head coach in franchise history.

On September 10, 2017, McDermott won his NFL head coaching debut in the season opening 21–12 victory over the New York Jets, becoming just the third Bills head coach to win his first game with the team after Marv Levy and Rex Ryan.

After a Week 2 loss to the Carolina Panthers, also McDermott's first return to Charlotte since leaving the Panthers organization, McDermott would lead the Bills to four wins in the next five games, including a victory over the reigning NFC champion Atlanta Falcons. However, they lost the next two games, including a 47–10 loss to the New Orleans Saints, which prompted him to make the controversial decision to bench starting quarterback Tyrod Taylor in favor of rookie backup Nathan Peterman. Peterman played poorly against the Los Angeles Chargers in his first career start, throwing five interceptions in the first half. He was benched for Taylor during the second half of the 54–24 loss, which dropped the Bills to 5–5.

Despite the string of losses, the Bills then went on a 4–2 run to finish the season at 9–7, clinching the #6-seed in the AFC and their first playoff appearance in 18 years, thus ending both the NFL's and the North American professional sports franchise's longest active playoff droughts during McDermott's first year as head coach. The Bills would go on to lose to the Jacksonville Jaguars 10–3 in the AFC Wild Card game.

==== 2018 season ====
In 2018, McDermott's Bills finished 6–10 and missed the playoffs, but had a strong finish to the season after a 2–7 start. After suffering blowout losses in four of the first nine games, partly caused by a lack of offensive talent, the Bills adjusted their roster, allowing them to stay competitive in each of the last seven games. Buffalo's defense improved in 2018. The 2018 season was McDermott's only losing season as a head coach.

==== 2019 season ====
McDermott was nominated for NFL Head Coach of the Year for the 2019 season after leading the Bills to a 10–6 record, receiving their second playoff berth in three seasons as the #5-seed in the AFC. The Bills would lose 22–19 to the Houston Texans in overtime during the Wild Card Round despite a 16–0 third quarter lead.

==== 2020 season ====
On August 12, 2020, McDermott signed a contract extension through 2025. The 2020 season marked many instances of growth and success for McDermott and the Bills. Quarterback Josh Allen developed dramatically, turning into an MVP candidate and leading the Bills to their first AFC East Division Title since 1995, as well as a 13–3 record, tied for second best in the league with the Green Bay Packers and behind the Kansas City Chiefs. They also tied a franchise record for wins previously set in 1990 and 1991. After winning their first division title since 1995, they won their first playoff game in 25 years with a win against the Indianapolis Colts in the Wild Card Round, before defeating the Baltimore Ravens 17–3 for a trip to their first AFC Championship Game in 27 years.

In the AFC Championship, the Bills lost to the Kansas City Chiefs 38–24, ending their 2020 season, and ending the Bills' hopes of returning to the Super Bowl for the first time in 27 years. McDermott was questioned by fans and analysts for his play calling, with criticism specifically aimed at his decision making in regards to attempting field goals instead of touchdowns on a pair of fourth and goal situations. The Bills finished their 2020 season with a cumulative record of 15–4.

==== 2021 season ====
Prior to the 2021 season, the Bills increased protection for Allen by drafting offensive tackle Spencer Brown from Northern Iowa. After losing the season opener verus Pittsburgh 23–16, the Bills went on a four–game winning streak, including a 35–0 shutout against Miami and a 40–0 shutout over Houston. The Bills had a record of 5–1 within the division, with the sole loss to New England having taken place during particularly poor weather—wind gusts nearby were measured at over 55 miles per hour. Overall, the Bills would finish 11–6. In the AFC Wild Card game, they beat the Patriots 47–17 in a 'perfect' offensive performance, with each Buffalo possession ending in either a touchdown or kneeling to end the period. There was much anticipation going into the next round, as they would be once again be facing the Chiefs, led by Patrick Mahomes. The game was hailed as one of the greatest modern NFL playoff games, with some commentators initially proclaiming it not only as the best playoff game in history, but one of the greatest games ever played, a high-scoring shootout between Allen and Mahomes reaching its climax in the final two minutes of the fourth quarter, where a combined 25 points were scored. The Bills had emerged from the fracas with 13 seconds left in regulation and a 36–33 lead. However, Buffalo's defense would not hold, and Kansas City was able to score a field goal to tie the game 36–36 as time expired. The Chiefs then won the coin toss for possession to begin overtime, and ultimately scored a touchdown on the resulting drive to win the game 42–36. After the season, partially in reaction to this result—given Buffalo's offense was not given a chance to participate in the overtime period—the NFL changed their postseason rules to guarantee both teams a possession of the ball, even if the opening drive results in a touchdown.

==== 2022 season ====
In the 2022 season, McDermott led the Bills to a 13–3 record and a first-place finish in the AFC East. The Bills did not play 17 games in 2022 due to the Damar Hamlin incident in Week 17, which McDermott got praise for helping cancel. The Bills won the Wild Card Round against the Miami Dolphins 34–31. The Bills' season ended in the Divisional Round with a 27–10 loss to the Cincinnati Bengals. Following Leslie Frazier's resignation in February 2023, McDermott assumed play-calling duties on defense for the 2023 season. On June 23, 2023, the Bills announced McDermott's contract had been extended through the 2027 season.

==== 2023 season ====
As of the end of the 2023 season, McDermott became second on the Bills' all-time wins list, behind only Marv Levy. In the 2023 season, McDermott led the team to an 11–6 record and an AFC East title. Following a Wild Card Round win over the Pittsburgh Steelers, the Bills lost to the Chiefs 27–24 in the Divisional Round.

==== 2024 season ====
In the 2024 season, McDermott led the Bills to a 13–4 record and another AFC East title. Following wins over the Denver Broncos in the Wild Card Round and the Baltimore Ravens in the Divisional Round, the Bills lost to the Kansas City Chiefs in the AFC Championship.

==== 2025 season ====
In 2025, the Bills went 12–5, but it was not enough to win the division, seeding them as a wild card team. In the Wild Card Round, the Bills beat the Jacksonville Jaguars on the road, their first road playoff win in 33 years. The Bills lost in the Divisional Round to the Broncos in overtime, after which McDermott criticized the referees for a pivotal play that was ruled an interception and ultimately led to the Bills losing. On January 19, 2026, it was announced that McDermott was fired after nine seasons with the Bills. Despite eight playoff appearances, and despite being perceived to have "overachieved" with a weaker roster in his final year, the Bills never reached the Super Bowl in McDermott's tenure with the team, with the Denver loss a major factor in Bills owner Terry Pegula's decision to remove him.

== Coaching tree ==
Sean McDermott has worked under two head coaches:

- Andy Reid, Philadelphia Eagles (2001–2010)
- Ron Rivera, Carolina Panthers (2011–2016)

Coaches under McDermott who have become NFL or NCAA head coaches:

- David Culley, Houston Texans (2021)
- Brian Daboll, New York Giants (2022–2025)
- Joe Brady, Buffalo Bills (2026–present)

== Head coaching record ==
Team	Year	Regular season					Postseason			
Team	Year	Won	Lost	Ties	Win %	Finish	Won	Lost	Win %	Result
BUF	2017	9	7	0	.563	2nd in AFC East	0	1	.000	Lost to Jacksonville Jaguars in AFC Wild Card Game
BUF	2018	6	10	0	.375	3rd in AFC East	—	—	—	—
BUF	2019	10	6	0	.625	2nd in AFC East	0	1	.000	Lost to Houston Texans in AFC Wild Card Game
BUF	2020	13	3	0	.813	1st in AFC East	2	1	.667	Lost to Kansas City Chiefs in AFC Championship Game
BUF	2021	11	6	0	.647	1st in AFC East	1	1	.500	Lost to Kansas City Chiefs in AFC Divisional Game
BUF	2022	13	3	0	.813	1st in AFC East	1	1	.500	Lost to Cincinnati Bengals in AFC Divisional Game
BUF	2023	11	6	0	.647	1st in AFC East	1	1	.500	Lost to Kansas City Chiefs in AFC Divisional Game
BUF	2024	13	4	0	.765	1st in AFC East	2	1	.667	Lost to Kansas City Chiefs in AFC Championship Game
BUF	2025	12	5	0	.706	2nd in AFC East	1	1	.500	Lost to Denver Broncos in AFC Divisional Game
Total		98	50	0	.662		8	8	.500	

== 9/11 controversy ==
In December 2023, independent journalist Tyler Dunne published an exploratory article into McDermott's time as head coach of the Bills, with multiple critiques from Bills players and Dunne himself. In it, Dunne reported that during a 2019 team meeting, McDermott told the team they needed to work together like "the terrorists on Sept. 11, 2001," whom he cited as a group of people who worked perfectly to orchestrate their plan and began asking questions to the team about the terrorists' tactics.

McDermott was widely criticized in the sports media and on social media sites, with some questioning his leadership ability and calling for McDermott to be fired. When asked about it on the day of the article's release, he stated that he regretted it and apologized to the team soon after for not better communicating his point.

== Personal life ==
McDermott and his wife have three children. He is a devout Christian and has been outspoken about his faith.

In 2021, McDermott revealed that he has been treated for skin cancer "several times" since at least 2017.

McDermott made a guest cameo as himself in the 2025 Hallmark Channel original film, Holiday Touchdown: A Bills Love Story.
