= 2017 Buffalo Bills season =

58th season in franchise history; return to playoffs after 17-year drought

- Owner: Terry and Kim Pegula
- General manager: Brandon Beane
- Head coach: Sean McDermott
- Offensive coordinator: Rick Dennison
- Defensive coordinator: Leslie Frazier
- Home stadium: New Era Field

Results
- Record: 9–7
- Division place: 2nd AFC East
- Playoffs: Lost Wild Card Playoffs (at Jaguars) 3–10
- Pro Bowlers: 3: OG Richie Incognito; RB LeSean McCoy; S Micah Hyde

Uniform
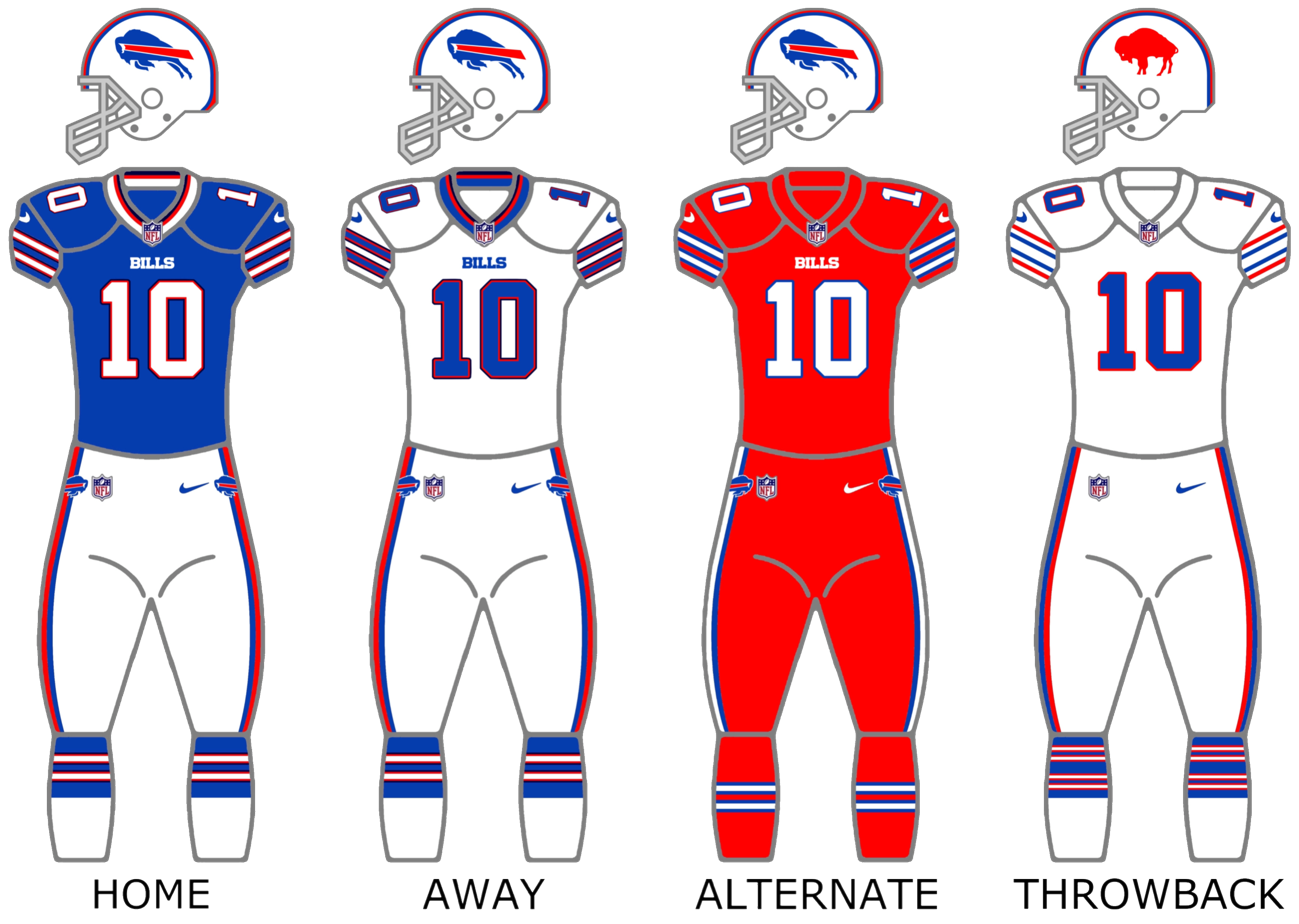

The 2017 season was the Buffalo Bills' 58th overall, 48th in the National Football League (NFL) and third full season under the ownership of Terry and Kim Pegula. The season was the first under the leadership of general manager Brandon Beane and head coach Sean McDermott. On December 31, 2017, the final week of the regular season, the Bills finally ended their 18-year playoff drought (previously the longest active drought in the NFL and the longest active playoff drought among the four major professional North American sport leagues) with the Bills winning 22–16 over the Dolphins and the Cincinnati Bengals upsetting the Baltimore Ravens 31–27.

The Bills also improved on their 7–9 record from 2016 and clinched their first winning season since 2014 (when Doug Marrone was head coach). However, the #6 seed Bills lost the Wild Card game against the #3 seed Jacksonville 10–3, extending their playoff victory drought to 22 years.

== Offseason ==
Beane joined the Bills after 19 seasons with the Carolina Panthers, the last two as assistant to then-general manager Dave Gettleman. Beane, who signed an undisclosed deal on May 9, 2017, replaced Doug Whaley, who was fired by Pegula after the 2017 NFL draft. Whaley was fired, along with the team's entire scouting staff, on April 30, 2017, less than 12 hours after the conclusion of the 2017 NFL draft. Over the course of the 2016 offseason and into the 2017 season, many of Whaley's draft picks were purged from the roster in trades and cuts. Of the 28 players Whaley had drafted from 2014 to 2017, only nine were still on the roster by the end of August. The 2017 season was also the first under McDermott, who spent the previous eight seasons as defensive coordinator, the last six with the Panthers. McDermott, who signed an undisclosed deal on January 11, 2017, replaced Rex Ryan, who was fired along with his twin brother Rob on December 27, 2016.

== Transactions ==
=== Coaching and front office changes ===
==== Coaching staff ====
Position	Name	Reason	2017 Replacement	Date	Notes
Head coach	Rex Ryan (Weeks 1–16), Anthony Lynn (Week 17)	Fired (Ryan)	Sean McDermott	January 11	
Defensive coordinator	Dennis Thurman	Fired	Leslie Frazier	January 13	
Linebackers coach	Bobby April III	Fired	Bob Babich	January 13	
Offensive line coach	Aaron Kromer	Fired	Juan Castillo	January 13	
Defensive line coach	John Blake	Fired	Mike Waufle	January 14	
Tight ends coach	Tony Sparano, Jr.	Fired	Rob Boras	January 17	
Running backs coach	Anthony Lynn (Weeks 1–2), Vacant (Weeks 3–17)	Resigned	Kelly Skipper	January 18	
Offensive coordinator	Greg Roman (Weeks 1–2), Anthony Lynn (Weeks 3–16)	Fired (Roman)	Rick Dennison	January 19	
Assistant offensive line coach	Pat Meyer	Fired	Andrew Dees	January 20	
Quarterbacks coach	David Lee	Fired	David Culley	January 24	
Wide receivers coach	Sanjay Lal	Fired	Phil McGeoghan	February 2	
Defensive quality control coach	position created		John Egorugwu	February 2	
Offensive quality control coach	position created		Marc Lubick	February 2	
Assistant special teams coach	Eric Smith	Fired	Matthew Smiley	February 2	
Special teams quality control	Kathryn Smith	position abolished		February 2	
Assistant defensive line coach	Jason Rebrovich	Fired	Bill Teerlinck	February 2	
Defensive backs coach	Tim McDonald	Fired	Gill Byrd	February 7	
Assistant defensive backs coach	Ed Reed	Fired	Bobby Babich	February 7	
Player engagement and alumni director	Paul Lancaster	Fired	Marlon Kerner	April 3	
Assistant strength and conditioning coach	Hal Luther	Fired	Will Greenberg	April 3	
Assistant athletic trainer	Jason Rebrovich	Fired	Denny Kellington	April 3	

==== Front office ====
Position	Name	Reason	2017 replacement	Date	Notes
General manager	Doug Whaley	Fired	Brandon Beane	May 9	
Player personnel advisor	Kelvin Fisher	Fired	Vacant		
Assistant general manager	Vacant		Joe Schoen	May 14	
Player personnel director	Jim Monos	Fired	Malik Boyd	May 17	
Assistant director of college scouting	Vacant		Lake Dawson	May 18	
National scout	Vacant		Marvin Allen	May 18	
National scout	Vacant		Brian Adams	May 18	
College scouting director	Vacant		Terrance Gray	May 25	
BLESTO scout	Vacant		Marcus Cooper	May 25	
Northeast area scout	Vacant		Pete Harris	May 25	
Pro scout	Vacant		Chris Marrow	May 25	

=== Roster changes ===
==== Arrivals ====
Position	Player	2016 Team	Date signed	Notes
LS	Reid Ferguson	None	January 2, 2017	2 years/$1.02 million (Reserve/Future)
RB	Cedric O'Neal	Philadelphia Eagles	January 2, 2017	2 years/$1.02 million (Reserve/Future)
CB	Joe Powell	New York Giants	January 2, 2017	2 years/$1.02 million (Reserve/Future)
CB	Max Valles	Buffalo Bills	January 2, 2017	2 years/$1.02 million (Reserve/Future)
QB	Josh Woodrum	Chicago Bears	January 2, 2017	2 years/$1.02 million (Reserve/Future)
SS	Colt Anderson	Buffalo Bills	January 27, 2017	1-year extension/$900,000
LB	Ramon Humber	New England Patriots	February 16, 2017	1 year/$900,000
FB	Mike Tolbert	Carolina Panthers	March 8, 2017	
S	Micah Hyde	Green Bay Packers	March 9, 2017	
S	Jordan Poyer	Cleveland Browns	March 9, 2017	
FB	Patrick DiMarco	Atlanta Falcons	March 9, 2017	
G	Vladimir Ducasse	Baltimore Ravens	March 9, 2017	
K	Steven Hauschka	Seattle Seahawks	March 9, 2017	4 years
WR	Corey Brown	Carolina Panthers	March 12, 2017	
DE	Ryan Davis	Dallas Cowboys	March 13, 2017	
WR	Jeremy Butler	San Diego Chargers	March 13, 2017	
RB	Joe Banyard	Jacksonville Jaguars	March 17, 2017	
CB	Leonard Johnson	Carolina Panthers	March 17, 2017	
WR	Corey Washington	None	March 17, 2017	
WR	Andre Holmes	Oakland Raiders	March 18, 2017	3 years/$6.5 million
CB	Marcus Cromartie	San Francisco 49ers	April 7, 2017	
OT	Cameron Jefferson	Denver Broncos	April 7, 2017	
LB	Jacob Lindsey	None	April 7, 2017	
DE	Jake Metz	Philadelphia Eagles	April 7, 2017	
G	Jordan Mudge	None	April 7, 2017	
CB	Bradley Sylve	None	April 7, 2017	
LB	Junior Sylvestre	Indianapolis Colts	April 7, 2017	
LB	Eddie Yarbrough	Denver Broncos	April 7, 2017	
DE	Ian Seau	Los Angeles Rams	April 10, 2017	
QB	T.J. Yates	Miami Dolphins	April 10, 2017	
S	Trae Elston	Cleveland Browns	April 21, 2017	
CB	Shareece Wright	Baltimore Ravens	May 1, 2017	1 year
CB	Charles James	Houston Texans/Indianapolis Colts	May 2, 2017	
LB	Carl Bradford	San Francisco 49ers	May 9, 2017	
TE	Wes Saxton	Washington Redskins	May 24, 2017	
WR	Rod Streater	San Francisco 49ers	May 24, 2017	
LB	Gerald Hodges	San Francisco 49ers	May 25, 2017	
CB	Greg Mabin	None	June 1, 2017	
WR	Rashad Ross	San Francisco 49ers	June 6, 2017	
S	Bacarri Rambo	Miami Dolphins	July 25, 2017	
LB	Sam Barrington	Kansas City Chiefs/New Orleans Saints	July 25, 2017	
G	Karim Barton	Tennessee Titans	July 25, 2017	
RB	Taiwan Jones	Oakland Raiders	August 2, 2017	
WR	Anquan Boldin	Detroit Lions	August 7, 2017	1 year/$2.75 million
CB	Jumal Rolle	Baltimore Ravens	August 12, 2017	
TE	Rory Anderson	Chicago Bears	August 20, 2017	
S	Adrian McDonald	Los Angeles Chargers	August 20, 2017	
QB	Keith Wenning	None	August 28, 2017	
QB	Joe Webb	Carolina Panthers	September 4, 2017	
DT	Cedric Thornton	Dallas Cowboys	September 5, 2017	
S	Shamarko Thomas	Pittsburgh Steelers	October 3, 2017	

==== Departures ====
Position	Player	2017 Team	Date signed	Notes	Source
CB	Nickell Robey-Coleman	Los Angeles Rams	March 7, 2017		
CB	Stephon Gilmore	New England Patriots	March 9, 2017	5 years/$65 million	
WR	Robert Woods	Los Angeles Rams	March 9, 2017	5 years/$39 million	
LS	Garrison Sanborn	Tampa Bay Buccaneers	March 14, 2017	1 year/$950,000	
QB	E.J. Manuel	Oakland Raiders	March 20, 2017	1 year/$800,000	
RB	Mike Gillislee	New England Patriots	April 24, 2017	2 years/$6.4 million	
S	Corey Graham	Philadelphia Eagles	August 3, 2017	1 year	

=== Trades ===
Player/picks acquired	From	Date traded	Player/picks traded
Conditional 7th-round pick	Los Angeles Chargers	July 26, 2017	Cardale Jones
E. J. Gaines; 2nd-round pick	Los Angeles Rams	August 11, 2017	Sammy Watkins; 6th-round pick
Jordan Matthews; 3rd-round pick	Philadelphia Eagles	August 11, 2017	Ronald Darby
2019 4th-round pick	Kansas City Chiefs	August 28, 2017	Reggie Ragland
Kaelin Clay; 2019 7th-round pick	Carolina Panthers	September 2, 2017	Kevon Seymour
Conditional 6th-round pick	Jacksonville Jaguars	October 27, 2017	Marcell Dareus
Kelvin Benjamin	Carolina Panthers	October 31, 2017	3rd-round pick 7th-round pick

==== Cuts ====
Position	Player	Date	Notes / Source
TE	Gerald Christian	March 6, 2017	
K	Dan Carpenter	March 6, 2017	
S	Phillip Thomas	March 6, 2017	
WR	Marcus Easley	March 8, 2017	
S	Aaron Williams	March 9, 2017	
CB	Marcus Cromartie	May 11, 2017	
CB	Marcus Roberson	May 11, 2017	
WR	Corey Washington	May 11, 2017	
LB	Junior Sylvestre	May 15, 2017	
WR	Jeremy Butler	May 15, 2017	
OT	Cyrus Kouandjio	May 24, 2017	
QB	Josh Woodrum	May 24, 2017	
CB	Charles Gaines	May 25, 2017	
S	Jonathan Dowling	June 1, 2017	
LB	Anthony Harrell	July 25, 2017	
C	Patrick Lewis	July 25, 2017	
CB	Charles James	August 12, 2017	
K	Austin Rehkow	August 20, 2017	
S	Bacarri Rambo	August 29, 2017	
G	Karim Barton	August 29, 2017	
DE	Jake Metz	August 29, 2017	
RB	Cedric O'Neal	August 29, 2017	
CB	Jumal Rolle	August 29, 2017	
WR	Rashad Ross	August 29, 2017	
QB	Keith Wenning	September 2, 2017	
RB	Jordan Johnson	September 2, 2017	
WR	Jeremy Butler	September 2, 2017	
WR	Dezmin Lewis	September 2, 2017	
WR	Brandon Reilly	September 2, 2017	
WR	Daikiel Shorts	September 2, 2017	
TE	Rory Anderson	September 2, 2017	
TE	Wes Saxton	September 2, 2017	
OT	Cameron Jefferson	September 2, 2017	
G	Jordan Mudge	September 2, 2017	
OT	Michael Ola	September 2, 2017	
OG	Greg Pyke	September 2, 2017	
OG	Zach Voytek	September 2, 2017	
DE	Marquavius Lewis	September 2, 2017	
DT	Nigel Williams	September 2, 2017	
DE	Ian Seau	September 2, 2017	
DE	Max Valles	September 2, 2017	
LB	Sam Harrington	September 2, 2017	
LB	Carl Bradford	September 2, 2017	
LB	Jacob Lindsey	September 2, 2017	
CB	Marcus Sayles	September 2, 2017	
CB	Bradley Sylve	September 2, 2017	
S	Shamiel Gary	September 2, 2017	
S	Adrian McDonald	September 2, 2017	
S	Joe Powell	September 2, 2017	
S	B.T. Sanders	September 2, 2017	
RB	Jonathan Williams	September 3, 2017	
LB	Gerald Hodges	September 3, 2017	
CB	Marcus Sayles	September 5, 2017	
S	B.T. Sanders	September 5, 2017	
CB	Greg Mabin	September 12, 2017	
WR	Daikiel Shorts	September 12, 2017	
LB	Jelani Jenkins	September 19, 2017	
S	Robert Blanton	October 3, 2017	
DE	Eric Lee	October 3, 2017	

==== Retirements ====
Position	Player	Date	Source
WR	Percy Harvin	March 17, 2017	
WR	Anquan Boldin	August 20, 2017	

=== Draft ===
2017 Buffalo Bills draft
Round	Pick	Player	Position	College	Notes
1	27	Tre'Davious White *	Cornerback	LSU	Trade from KC
2	37	Zay Jones	Wide receiver	East Carolina	Trade from LAR
2	63	Dion Dawkins *	Guard	Temple	Trade from ATL
5	163	Matt Milano *	Linebacker	Boston College	Compensatory pick from NE
5	171	Nathan Peterman	Quarterback	Pittsburgh	Trade from DAL
6	195	Tanner Vallejo	Linebacker	Boise State	
Made roster † Pro Football Hall of Fame * Made at least one Pro Bowl during career

Notes

- The Bills sent their 2017 first-round pick (10th overall), later revealed to be Patrick Mahomes, to the Kansas City Chiefs in order to trade down during the 2017 draft and select Tre'Davious White 27th overall. The Bills acquired an additional third-round selection (91st overall), later revealed to be John Johnson—who was traded, along with their original second-round selection (44th overall), later revealed to be Gerald Everett, to the Los Angeles Rams in order to trade up and select Zay Jones 37th overall—an additional fifth-round selection (149th overall), later revealed to be Damontae Kazee—who was traded to the Atlanta Falcons along with the Bills third round pick and another fifth rounder for the Falcons second-round selection (63rd overall), later revealed to be Dion Dawkins. The Bills sent their 2016 second-round pick (49th overall), fourth-round pick and 2017 fourth-round pick (both 117th overall), later revealed to be Jarran Reed, Pharoh Cooper and Josh Reynolds, respectively, to the Chicago Bears in order to trade up during the 2016 draft and select Reggie Ragland 41st overall (Reynolds was later traded to the Rams). The Bills acquired a fifth-round selection (163rd overall), later revealed to be Matt Milano, as part of a trade that sent Mike Gillislee to the New England Patriots. The Bills acquired a fifth-round selection (171st overall), later revealed to be Nathan Peterman, as part of a trade that sent their seventh-round pick (228th overall), later revealed to be Joey Ivie, along with Matt Cassel, to the Dallas Cowboys.

=== Undrafted free agents ===
Position	Player	College	Notes
TE	Jason Croom	Tennessee	
RB	Jordan Johnson	Buffalo	
DE	Marquavius Lewis	South Carolina	
P	Austin Rehkow	Idaho	
WR	Brandon Reilly	Nebraska	
G	Greg Pyke	Georgia	
S	B.T. Sanders	Nicholls State	
CB	Marcus Sayles	West Georgia	
WR	Daikiel Shorts	West Virginia	
TE	Keith Towbridge	Louisville	
S	Jeremy Tyler	West Virginia	
DT	Nigel Williams	Virginia Tech	
G	Zach Voytek	New Haven	

== Staff ==
2017 Buffalo Bills staff
Front office: Owner/CEO – Terry Pegula; Owner – Kim Pegula; President – Russ Brandon; General manager – Brandon Beane; Assistant general manager – Joe Schoen; Vice president of player personnel – Brian Gaine; College scouting director – Terrance Gray; Senior VP of football administration – Jim Overdorf; Assistant director of college scouting – Lake Dawson; Director of pro personnel – Malik Boyd; Director of football administration – Kevin Meganck; Director of football operations – Brendan Rowe; Head coaches: Head coach – Sean McDermott; Offensive coaches: Offensive coordinator – Rick Dennison; Quarterbacks – David Culley; Running backs – Kelly Skipper; Wide receivers – Phil McGeoghan; Tight ends – Rob Boras; Offensive line/run game coordinator – Juan Castillo; Assistant offensive line – Andrew Dees; Offensive assistant – Chad Hall; Offensive quality control/assistant quarterbacks – Marc Lubick	Defensive coaches: Defensive coordinator – Leslie Frazier; Defensive line – Mike Waufle; Assistant defensive line – Bill Teerlinck; Linebackers – Bob Babich; Defensive backs – Gill Byrd; Assistant defensive backs – Bobby Babich; Defensive assistant – Jim Salgado; Defensive quality control – John Egorugwu; Special teams coaches: Special teams – Danny Crossman; Assistant special teams – Matthew Smiley; Strength and conditioning: Head strength and conditioning – Eric Ciano; Assistant head strength and conditioning – Hal Luther; Strength and conditioning assistant – Jason Oszvart; Strength and conditioning assistant – Mark Loecher

== Final roster ==
2017 Buffalo Bills roster
Quarterbacks (QB): 2 Nathan Peterman; 5 Tyrod Taylor; 14 Joe Webb; Running backs (RB): 42 Patrick DiMarco FB; 25 LeSean McCoy; 45 Marcus Murphy; 35 Mike Tolbert FB; Wide receivers (WR): 13 Kelvin Benjamin; 16 Malachi Dupre; 11 Zay Jones; 89 Brandon Reilly; 15 Brandon Tate; 10 Deonte Thompson; Tight ends (TE): 85 Charles Clay; 84 Nick O'Leary; 88 Khari Lee; 82 Logan Thomas	Offensive linemen (OL): 73 Dion Dawkins T; 62 Vladimir Ducasse G; 72 Ryan Groy C; 66 Seantrel Henderson T; 64 Richie Incognito G; 68 Conor McDermott T; 76 John Miller G; 79 Jordan Mills T; 70 Eric Wood C; Defensive linemen (DL): 75 Cap Capi DE; 56 Ryan Davis DE; 94 Rickey Hatley DT; 55 Jerry Hughes DE; 91 Cedric Thornton DT; 92 Adolphus Washington DT; 95 Kyle Williams DT; 54 Eddie Yarbrough DE	Linebackers (LB): 57 Lorenzo Alexander OLB; 52 Preston Brown MLB; 50 Ramon Humber OLB; 44 Deon Lacey OLB; 58 Matt Milano OLB; 40 Tanner Vallejo MLB; Defensive backs (DB): 33 Colt Anderson FS; 41 Breon Borders CB; 28 E. J. Gaines CB; 23 Micah Hyde SS; 24 Leonard Johnson CB; 30 Lafayette Pitts CB; 21 Jordan Poyer FS; 29 Shamarko Thomas SS; 27 Tre'Davious White CB; 20 Shareece Wright CB; Special teams (ST): 69 Reid Ferguson LS; 4 Stephen Hauschka K; 6 Colton Schmidt P	Practice squad: 19 Quan Bray WR; 7 Cory Carter P; 80 Jason Croom TE; 61 Josh James T; 97 Marquavius Lewis DE; 31 Dean Marlowe FS; 38 L. J. McCray SS; 60 Adam Redmond C; 74 De'Ondre Wesley RT; 53 Xavier Woodson-Luster MLB; Reserve: 17 Jeremy Butler WR (IR); 39 Travaris Cadet RB (IR); 77 Cordy Glenn LT (IR); 18 Andre Holmes WR (IR); 26 Taiwan Jones RB (IR); 90 Shaq Lawson DE (IR); 87 Jordan Matthews WR (IR); 89 Keith Towbridge TE (IR); Rookies in italics 53 active, 8 reserve, 10 practice squad

== Preseason ==
Week	Date	Opponent	Result	Record	Venue	Recap
1	August 10	Minnesota Vikings	L 10–17	0–1	New Era Field	Recap
2	August 17	at Philadelphia Eagles	L 16–20	0–2	Lincoln Financial Field	Recap
3	August 26	at Baltimore Ravens	L 9–13	0–3	M&T Bank Stadium	Recap
4	August 31	Detroit Lions	W 27–17	1–3	New Era Field	Recap

== Regular season ==
=== Schedule ===
Week	Date	Opponent	Result	Record	Venue	Recap
1	September 10	**New York Jets**	**W** 21–12	1–0	New Era Field	Recap
2	September 17	at Carolina Panthers	**L** 3–9	1–1	Bank of America Stadium	Recap
3	September 24	Denver Broncos	**W** 26–16	2–1	New Era Field	Recap
4	October 1	at Atlanta Falcons	**W** 23–17	3–1	Mercedes-Benz Stadium	Recap
5	October 8	at Cincinnati Bengals	**L** 16–20	3–2	Paul Brown Stadium	Recap
6	Bye					
7	October 22	Tampa Bay Buccaneers	**W** 30–27	4–2	New Era Field	Recap
8	October 29	Oakland Raiders	**W** 34–14	5–2	New Era Field	Recap
9	November 2	at **New York Jets**	**L** 21–34	5–3	MetLife Stadium	Recap
10	November 12	New Orleans Saints	**L** 10–47	5–4	New Era Field	Recap
11	November 19	at Los Angeles Chargers	**L** 24–54	5–5	StubHub Center	Recap
12	November 26	at Kansas City Chiefs	**W** 16–10	6–5	Arrowhead Stadium	Recap
13	December 3	**New England Patriots**	**L** 3–23	6–6	New Era Field	Recap
14	December 10	Indianapolis Colts	**W** 13–7 (OT)	7–6	New Era Field	Recap
15	December 17	**Miami Dolphins**	**W** 24–16	8–6	New Era Field	Recap
16	December 24	at **New England Patriots**	**L** 16–37	8–7	Gillette Stadium	Recap
17	December 31	at **Miami Dolphins**	**W** 22–16	9–7	Hard Rock Stadium	Recap

Note: Intra-division opponents are in bold text.

=== Game summaries ===
==== Week 1: vs. New York Jets ====
Week One: New York Jets at Buffalo Bills – Game summary

Quarter	1	2	3	4	Total
Jets	0	6	6	0	**12**
**Bills**	0	7	7	7	**21**

at New Era Field, Orchard Park, New York

- Date: September 10
- Game time: 1:00 p.m. EDT
- Game weather: 65 °F (18 °C), sun and clouds
- Game attendance: 68,751
- Referee: John Hussey
- TV announcers (CBS): Kevin Harlan, Rich Gannon, and Steve Tasker
- Recap, Game book

Game information

**First quarter**

- No scoring plays.

**Second quarter**

- BUF – Charles Clay 1-yard pass from Tyrod Taylor (Steven Hauschka kick), 11:26. Bills 7–0. **Drive: 12 plays, 77 yards, 5:31.**
- NYJ – Chandler Catanzaro 48-yard field goal, 6:34. Bills 7–3. **Drive: 9 plays, 45 yards, 4:52.**
- NYJ – Chandler Catanzaro 52-yard field goal, 1:44. Bills 7–6. Drive: 8 plays, 31 yards, 2:15.

**Third quarter**

- BUF – Andre Holmes 1-yard pass from Taylor (Steven Hauschka kick), 6:52. Bills 14–6. **Drive: 6 yards, 64 yards, 2:13.**
- NYJ – Josh McCown 1-yard run (pass failed), 2:00. Bills 14–12. **Drive: 11 plays, 75 yards, 4:52.**

**Fourth quarter**

- BUF – Mike Tolbert 1-yard run (Steven Hauschka kick), 12:47. Bills 21–12. **Drive: 9 plays, 80 yards, 4:03.**

**Top passers**

- NYJ – Josh McCown – 26/39, 187 yards, 2 INT
- BUF – Tyrod Taylor – 16/28, 224 yards, 2 TD, INT

**Top rushers**

- NYJ – Bilal Powell – 7 rushes, 22 yards
- BUF – LeSean McCoy – 22 rushes, 110 yards

**Top receivers**

- NYJ – Jermaine Kearse – 7 receptions, 59 yards
- BUF – Jordan Matthews – 2 receptions, 61 yards

With the defending Super Bowl champion New England Patriots losing 42–27 to the Kansas City Chiefs to kick off the 2017 NFL season and Hurricane Irma delaying the game between the Miami Dolphins and the Tampa Bay Buccaneers to Week 11, the Bills hoped to take advantage and grab first place in the AFC East by beating the Jets, who swept them in 2016. Quarterback Tyrod Taylor threw 1-yard touchdown passes to both tight end Charles Clay and wide receiver Andre Holmes, while fullback Mike Tolbert rushed for a third touchdown. With Tolbert's score, the Bills recorded a rushing touchdown in 13 straight games, tying a team record set in 1980 and extending the longest active streak in the NFL. Safeties Jordan Poyer and Micah Hyde both got their first takeaways as Bills in the fourth quarter, with Hyde's interception ending any hope of a Jets rally. With the win, the Bills opened the season at 1–0 and in first place in the AFC East heading into their Week 2 matchup with head coach Sean McDermott's former team, the Carolina Panthers.

==== Week 2: at Carolina Panthers ====
Week Two: Buffalo Bills at Carolina Panthers – Game summary

Quarter	1	2	3	4	Total
Bills	0	0	0	3	**3**
**Panthers**	3	3	0	3	**9**

at Bank of America Stadium, Charlotte, North Carolina

- Date: September 17
- Game time: 1:00 p.m. EDT
- Game weather: 83 °F (28 °C), sunny
- Game attendance: 74,122
- Referee: Walt Coleman
- TV announcers (CBS): Kevin Harlan and Rich Gannon
- Recap, Gamebook

Game information

**First quarter**

- CAR – Graham Gano 34-yard field goal, 8:54. Panthers 3–0. **Drive: 13 plays, 59 yards, 6:11.**

**Second quarter**

- CAR – Graham Gano 28-yard field goal, 2:06. Panthers 6–0. **Drive: 10 plays, 46 yards, 6:51.**

**Third quarter**

- No scoring plays.

**Fourth quarter**

- BUF – Steven Hauschka 45-yard field goal, 11:15. Panthers 6–3. **Drive: 9 plays, 30 yards, 4:18.**
- CAR – Graham Gano 20-yard field goal, 2:38. Panthers 9–3. **Drive: 15 plays, 73 yards, 8:34.**

**Top passers**

- BUF – Tyrod Taylor – 17/25, 125 yards
- CAR – Cam Newton – 20/32, 228 yards

**Top rushers**

- BUF – Tyrod Taylor – 8 rushes, 55 yards
- CAR – Jonathan Stewart – 15 rushes, 40 yards

**Top receivers**

- BUF – LeSean McCoy – 6 receptions, 34 yards
- CAR – Kelvin Benjamin – 6 receptions, 77 yards

Looking for their first 2–0 start since 2014, the Bills traveled to Bank of America Stadium for an inter-conference matchup with the Panthers. Many former Panthers players and personnel made their return to Carolina as members of the Bills, including fullback Mike Tolbert, cornerback Leonard Johnson, wide receiver Kaelin Clay, general manager Brandon Beane and head coach Sean McDermott. Unfortunately, despite the defense sacking Panthers quarterback Cam Newton six times and only allowing three field goals from Graham Gano, the Bills offense could not take advantage, only managing a 45-yard field goal from Steven Hauschka in the fourth quarter, the team's lowest points since losing 45–3 to the San Francisco 49ers in 2012. A potential game-winning touchdown pass from quarterback Tyrod Taylor to rookie WR Zay Jones on 4th-and-11 with 9 seconds remaining sailed off Jones’ fingertips, putting the game away for the Panthers. The Bills fell to 1–1 with the loss.

==== Week 3: vs. Denver Broncos ====
Week Three: Denver Broncos at Buffalo Bills – Game summary

Quarter	1	2	3	4	Total
Broncos	3	10	3	0	**16**
**Bills**	0	13	7	6	**26**

at New Era Field, Orchard Park, New York

- Date: September 24
- Game time: 1:00 p.m. EDT
- Game weather: 83 °F (28 °C), sunny
- Game attendance: 68,865
- Referee: Carl Cheffers
- TV announcers (CBS): Spero Dedes and Adam Archuleta
- Recap, Gamebook

Game information

**First quarter**

- DEN – Brandon McManus 38-yard field goal, 0:53. Broncos 3–0. **Drive: 12 plays, 53 yards, 5:03.**

**Second quarter**

- BUF – Andre Holmes 2-yard pass from Tyrod Taylor (Steven Hauschka kick), 11:41. Bills 7–3. **Drive: 10 plays, 74 yards, 4:08.**
- DEN – Jamaal Charles 12-yard run (Brandon McManus kick), 10:26. Broncos 10–7. **Drive: 3 plays, 79 yards, 1:15.**
- BUF – Steven Hauschka 49-yard field goal, 2:51. Tied 10–10. **Drive: 5 plays, 1 yard, 1:55.**
- DEN – Brandon McManus 35-yard field goal, 0:42. Broncos 13–10. **Drive: 9 plays, 58 yards, 2:09.**
- BUF – Steven Hauschka 55-yard field goal, 0:01. Tied 13–13. **Drive: 5 plays, 38 yards, 0:41.**

**Third quarter**

- DEN – Brandon McManus 28-yard field goal, 7:47. Broncos 16–13. **Drive: 10 plays, 49 yards, 4:58.**
- BUF – Charles Clay 6-yard pass from Taylor (Steven Hauschka kick), 6:20. Bills 20–16. **Drive: 4 plays, 69 yards, 1:27.**

**Fourth quarter**

- BUF – Steven Hauschka 53-yard field goal, 13:52. Bills 23–16. **Drive: 4 plays, −3 yards, 1:37.**
- BUF – Steven Hauschka 27-yard field goal, 3:14. Bills 26–16. **Drive: 16 plays, 53 yards, 7:30.**

**Top passers**

- DEN – Trevor Siemian – 24/40, 259 yards, 2 INT
- BUF – Tyrod Taylor – 20/26, 213 yards, 2 TD

**Top rushers**

- DEN – Jamaal Charles – 9 rushes, 56 yards, TD
- BUF – Mike Tolbert – 11 rushes, 41 yards

**Top receivers**

- DEN – Demaryius Thomas – 6 receptions, 98 yards
- BUF – Jordan Matthews – 3 receptions, 61 yards

Following a close loss to the Panthers, the Bills returned home to host the Denver Broncos. Despite running back LeSean McCoy only amassing 21 rushing yards, the Bills still managed to score with quarterback Tyrod Taylor passing for 213 yards and two touchdowns and kicker Steven Hauschka kicking four field goals, including two from beyond 50 yards. The Bills defense intercepted quarterback Trevor Siemian twice as the team won a close-fought game 26–16. An unsportsmanlike-conduct penalty against linebacker Von Miller allowed the Bills to continue a stalled drive in the fourth quarter and ice the game with Hauschka's fourth field goal. With the win, the Bills improved to 2–1 heading into their Week 4 matchup against the defending NFC Champion Atlanta Falcons.

Prior to the game, several members of both teams knelt during the national anthem in the wake of President Donald Trump's comments regarding NFL players who protested.

==== Week 4: at Atlanta Falcons ====
Week Four: Buffalo Bills at Atlanta Falcons – Game summary

Quarter	1	2	3	4	Total
**Bills**	0	7	7	9	**23**
Falcons	0	10	0	7	**17**

at Mercedes-Benz Stadium, Atlanta, Georgia

- Date: October 1
- Game time: 1:00 p.m. EDT
- Game weather: Played indoors (retractable roof closed)
- Game attendance: 71,273
- Referee: Terry McAulay
- TV announcers (CBS): Greg Gumbel, Trent Green, and Jamie Erdahl
- Recap, Gamebook

Game information

**First quarter**

- No scoring plays.

**Second quarter**

- ATL – Matt Bryant 28-yard field goal, 10:31. Falcons 3–0. **Drive: 6 plays, 44 yards, 3:55.**
- BUF – Jordan Matthews 9-yard pass from Tyrod Taylor (Steven Hauschka kick), 6:51. Bills 7–3. **Drive: 8 plays, 77 yards, 3:40.**
- ATL – Devonta Freeman 1-yard run (Matt Bryant kick), 0:18. Falcons 10–7. **Drive: 9 plays, 78 yards, 3:02.**

**Third quarter**

- BUF – Tre'Davious White 52-yard fumble return (Steven Hauschka kick), 10:55. Bills 14–10.

**Fourth quarter**

- BUF – Steven Hauschka 24-yard field goal, 12:00. Bills 17–10. **Drive: 19 plays, 82 yards, 11:20.**
- ATL – Justin Hardy 3-yard pass from Matt Ryan (Matt Bryant kick), 7:00. Tied 17–17. **Drive: 10 plays, 75 yards, 5:00.**
- BUF – Steven Hauschka 56-yard field goal, 4:44. Bills 20–17. **Drive: 5 plays, 37 yards, 2:16.**
- BUF – Steven Hauschka 55-yard field goal, 3:06. Bills 23–17. **Drive: 4 plays, −2 yards, 0:21.**

**Top passers**

- BUF – Tyrod Taylor – 12/20, 182 yards, TD
- ATL – Matt Ryan – 24/42, 242 yards, TD, 2 INT

**Top rushers**

- BUF – LeSean McCoy – 20 rushes, 76 yards
- ATL – Tevin Coleman – 9 rushes, 79 yards

**Top receivers**

- BUF – Charles Clay – 5 receptions, 112 yards
- ATL – Tevin Coleman – 4 receptions, 65 yards

Looking to continue their winning ways after upsetting the Broncos the previous week, the Bills traveled to Atlanta to take on the Atlanta Falcons, who made it to the Super Bowl the previous season, as fullback Patrick DiMarco made his first return to Atlanta since signing with the Bills in free agency. The Bills defense held the Falcons in check for most of the game and tight end Charles Clay recorded his first 100-yard receiving game since 2015. A key highlight was a fumble from Falcons quarterback Matt Ryan that arguably looked like a forward pass, but was ruled a fumble and returned for a 52-yard touchdown by rookie cornerback Tre'Davious White. With the win, the Bills improve to 3–1 for the first time since 2011 and regained sole possession of first place in the AFC East with the Patriots losing 33–30 to the Panthers, but lost starting receiver Jordan Matthews and starting linebacker Ramon Humber to multi-week thumb injuries.

==== Week 5: at Cincinnati Bengals ====
Week Five: Buffalo Bills at Cincinnati Bengals – Game summary

Quarter	1	2	3	4	Total
Bills	0	10	3	3	**16**
**Bengals**	0	10	0	10	**20**

at Paul Brown Stadium, Cincinnati, Ohio

- Date: October 8
- Game time: 1:00 p.m. EDT
- Game weather: 63 °F (17 °C), light rain
- Game attendance: 52,367
- Referee: Pete Morelli
- TV announcers (CBS): Tom McCarthy, Steve Beuerlein, and Steve Tasker
- Recap, Gamebook

Game information

**First quarter**

- CIN – A. J. Green 77-yard pass from Andy Dalton (Randy Bullock kick), 11:39. Bengals 7–0. **Drive: 1 play, 77 yards, 0:10.**
- BUF – Steven Hauschka 31-yard field goal, 0:15. Bengals 7–3. **Drive: 10 plays, 72 yards, 4:10.**

**Second quarter**

- CIN – Randy Bullock 30-yard field goal, 9:05. Bengals 10–3. **Drive: 12 plays, 63 yards, 6:09.**
- BUF – Brandon Tate 12-yard pass from Tyrod Taylor (Steven Hauschka kick), 3:15. Tied 10–10. **Drive: 6 plays, 23 yards, 1:34.**

**Third quarter**

- BUF – Steven Hauschka 38-yard field goal, 1:59. Bills 13–10. **Drive: 9 plays, 51 yards, 4:40.**

**Fourth quarter**

- CIN – Joe Mixon 5-yard run (Randy Bullock kick), 15:00. Bengals 17–13. **Drive: 7 plays, 75 yards, 1:59.**
- BUF – Steven Hauschka 28-yard field goal, 9:03. Bengals 17–16. **Drive: 4 plays, 2 yards, 1:38.**
- CIN – Randy Bullock 29-yard field goal, 3:37. Bengals 20–16. **Drive: 11 plays, 59 yards, 5:26.**

**Top passers**

- BUF – Tyrod Taylor – 20/37, 166 yards, TD, INT
- CIN – Andy Dalton – 22/36, 328 yards, TD, 2 INT

**Top rushers**

- BUF – LeSean McCoy – 6 rushes, 26 yards
- CIN – Joe Mixon – 15 rushes, 51 yards, TD

**Top receivers**

- BUF – Nick O'Leary – 5 receptions, 54 yards
- CIN – A. J. Green – 7 receptions, 189 yards, TD

Looking to continue their winning ways after upsetting the Falcons the week prior, the Bills traveled down to Cincinnati to take on the Bengals, who got their first win of the season when they defeated their rival Cleveland Browns 31–7 the previous week. Already missing wideout Jordan Matthews, the Bills offense sputtered for the most part after tight end Charles Clay suffered a knee injury in the second quarter and was ruled out the rest of the game. The Bengals rallied behind strong performances from quarterback Andy Dalton and receiver A. J. Green despite the duo committing three turnovers, and won a close-fought game in the rain 20–16. With the loss, Buffalo fell to 3–2 going into their bye week.

==== Week 7: vs. Tampa Bay Buccaneers ====
Week Seven: Tampa Bay Buccaneers at Buffalo Bills – Game summary

Quarter	1	2	3	4	Total
Buccaneers	6	0	7	14	**27**
**Bills**	3	7	7	13	**30**

at New Era Field, Orchard Park, New York

- Date: October 22
- Game time: 1:00 p.m. EDT
- Game weather: 74 °F (23 °C), sunny
- Game attendance: 68,561
- Referee: Clete Blakeman
- TV announcers (Fox): Chris Myers, Daryl Johnston, and Laura Okmin
- Recap, Gamebook

Game information

**First quarter**

- TB – Patrick Murray 50-yard field goal, 9:44. Buccaneers 3–0. **Drive: 11 plays, 43 yards, 5:16.**
- BUF – Steven Hauschka 25-yard field goal, 5:45. Tied 3–3. **Drive: 11 plays, 69 yards, 3:59.**
- TB – Patrick Murray 25-yard field goal, 0:22. Buccaneers 6–3. **Drive: 11 plays, 68 yards, 5:23.**

**Second quarter**

- BUF – LeSean McCoy 1-yard run (Steven Hauschka kick), 9:26. Bills 10–6. **Drive: 12 plays, 78 yards, 5:56.**

**Third quarter**

- BUF – Logan Thomas 22-yard pass from Tyrod Taylor (Steven Hauschka kick), 11:36. Bills 17–6. **Drive: 8 plays, 75 yards, 3:24.**
- TB – O. J. Howard 7-yard pass from Jameis Winston (Patrick Murray kick), 7:11. Bills 17–13. **Drive: 7 plays, 75 yards, 4:25.**

**Fourth quarter**

- BUF – Steven Hauschka 52-yard field goal, 13:31. Bills 20–13. **Drive: 10 plays, 46 yards, 4:26.**
- TB – O. J. Howard 33-yard pass from Jameis Winston (Patrick Murray kick), 10:08. Tied 20–20. **Drive: 7 plays, 75 yards, 3:23.**
- TB – Mike Evans 12-yard pass from Winston (Patrick Murray kick), 3:14. Buccaneers 27–20. **Drive: 10 plays, 54 yards, 6:16.**
- BUF – LeSean McCoy 7-yard run (Steven Hauschka kick), 2:28. Tied 27–27. **Drive: 3 plays, 75 yards, 0:46.**
- BUF – Steven Hauschka 30-yard field goal, 0:14. Bills 30–27. **Drive: 7 plays, 21 yards, 2:06.**

**Top passers**

- TB – Jameis Winston – 32/44, 384 yards, 3 TD, INT
- BUF – Tyrod Taylor – 20/33, 268 yards, TD

**Top rushers**

- TB – Doug Martin – 20 rushes, 49 yards
- BUF – LeSean McCoy – 23 rushes, 91 yards, 2 TD

**Top receivers**

- TB – Mike Evans – 7 receptions, 88 yards, TD
- BUF – LeSean McCoy – 5 receptions, 31 yards

Fresh off their bye week, the Bills returned home to host the Tampa Bay Buccaneers. LeSean McCoy scored his first two touchdowns of the season as the Bills won a shootout match 30–27, with their final 10 points coming in the last three minutes of the game. With Tampa Bay taking the lead after forcing McCoy to fumble and capitalizing with a Mike Evans touchdown pass from Jameis Winston, Tyrod Taylor led the Bills 75 yards downfield, connecting with newly signed receiver Deonte Thompson for 44 yards to help set up McCoy's second touchdown. Tre'Davious White then forced the Buccaneers to fumble on their ensuing drive, setting up Steven Hauschka's game winning field goal. The Bills improve to 4–2 with the win.

Note: Former Bills Garrison Sanborn and Ryan Fitzpatrick made their first return to New Era Field since signing with the Buccaneers in free agency.

==== Week 8: vs. Oakland Raiders ====
Week Eight: Oakland Raiders at Buffalo Bills – Game summary

Quarter	1	2	3	4	Total
Raiders	7	0	0	7	**14**
**Bills**	0	14	6	14	**34**

at New Era Field, Orchard Park, New York

- Date: October 29
- Game time: 1:00 p.m.
- Game weather: 42 °F (6 °C), rain
- Game attendance: 69,599
- Referee: Ed Hochuli
- TV announcers (CBS): Andrew Catalon and James Lofton
- Recap, Gamebook

Game information

**First quarter**

- OAK – Jamize Olawale 1-yard run (Giorgio Tavecchio kick), 9:28. Raiders 7–0. **Drive: 13 plays, 81 yards, 5:32.**

**Second quarter**

- BUF – Andre Holmes 6-yard pass from Tyrod Taylor (Steven Hauschka kick), 8:46. Tied 7–7. **Drive: 9 plays, 64 yards, 4:40.**
- BUF – Matt Milano 40-yard fumble return (Steven Hauschka kick), 0:32. Bills 14–7.

**Third quarter**

- BUF – Steven Hauschka 35-yard field goal, 11:44. Bills 17–7. **Drive: 4 plays, −3 yards, 1:22.**
- BUF – Steven Hauschka 44-yard field goal, 8:18. Bills 20–7. **Drive: 6 plays, 15 yards, 2:23.**

**Fourth quarter**

- BUF – Tyrod Taylor 1-yard run (Steven Hauschka kick), 14:57. Bills 27–7. **Drive: 12 plays, 80 yards, 7:19.**
- OAK – DeAndré Washington 4-yard pass from Derek Carr (Giorgio Tavecchio kick), 10:50. Bills 27–14. **Drive: 9 plays, 75 yards, 4:07.**
- BUF – LeSean McCoy 48-yard run (Steven Hauschka kick), 3:12. Bills 34–14. **Drive: 1 play, 48 yards, 0:09.**

**Top passers**

- OAK – Derek Carr – 31/49, 313 yards, TD, 2 INT
- BUF – Tyrod Taylor – 20/27, 165 yards, TD

**Top rushers**

- OAK – DeAndré Washington – 6 rushes, 26 yards
- BUF – LeSean McCoy – 27 rushes, 161 yards, TD

**Top receivers**

- OAK – DeAndré Washington – 8 receptions, 62 yards, TD
- BUF – LeSean McCoy – 6 receptions, 22 yards

The Bills hosted the Oakland Raiders in week 8. This was the first week they were without All-Pro defensive lineman Marcell Dareus, who was traded to the Jacksonville Jaguars for a sixth-round draft pick just two days prior to the game. Nonetheless, the defense was still able to limit a potent Raiders offense to just 14 points, causing four turnovers in the process. LeSean McCoy led the team with over 180 yards from scrimmage and rookie linebacker Matt Milano also scored off a fumble recovery. With the win, the Bills improved to 5–2 for the third time since 2008.

==== Week 9: at New York Jets ====
Week Nine: Buffalo Bills at New York Jets – Game summary

Quarter	1	2	3	4	Total
Bills	0	7	0	14	**21**
**Jets**	7	3	14	10	**34**

at MetLife Stadium, East Rutherford, New Jersey

- Date: November 2
- Game time: 8:25 p.m.
- Game weather: 68 °F (20 °C), clear
- Game attendance: 77,562
- Referee: Jerome Boger
- TV announcers (NFLN): Jim Nantz, Tony Romo, Tracy Wolfson, and Jay Feely
- Recap, Gamebook

Game information

**First quarter**

- NYJ – Josh McCown 10-yard run (Chandler Catanzaro kick), 7:43. Jets 7–0. **Drive: 8 plays, 54 yards, 3:46.**

**Second quarter**

- BUF – Zay Jones 10-yard pass from Tyrod Taylor (Steven Hauschka kick), 14:52. Tied 7–7. **Drive: 8 plays, 62 yards, 3:16.**
- NYJ – Chandler Catanzaro 45-yard field goal, 10:26. Jets 10–7. **Drive: 9 plays, 52 yards, 4:26.**

**Third quarter**

- NYJ – Robby Anderson 25-yard pass from Josh McCown (Chandler Catanzaro kick), 9:50. Jets 17–7. **Drive: 7 plays, 74 yards, 3:49.**
- NYJ – Matt Forte 10-yard run (Chandler Catanzaro kick), 4:16. Jets 24–7. **Drive: 2 plays, 61 yards, 0:57.**

**Fourth quarter**

- NYJ – Matt Forte 5-yard run (Chandler Catanzaro kick), 11:21. Jets 31–7. **Drive: 1 play, 5 yards, 0:05.**
- NYJ – Chandler Catanzaro 32-yard field goal, 6:42. Jets 34–7. **Drive: 6 plays, 18 yards, 3:47.**
- BUF – Deonte Thompson 26-yard pass from Tyrod Taylor (Steven Hauschka kick), 4:10. Jets 34–14. **Drive: 10 plays, 75 yards, 2:32.**
- BUF – Tyrod Taylor 1-yard run (Steven Hauschka kick), 2:29. Jets 34–21. **Drive: 7 plays, 52 yards, 1:41.**

**Top passers**

- BUF – Tyrod Taylor – 29/40, 285 yards, 2 TD
- NYJ – Josh McCown – 14/20, 140 yards, TD

**Top rushers**

- BUF – Tyrod Taylor – 6 rushes, 35 yards, TD
- NYJ – Matt Forte – 14 rushes, 77 yards, 2 TD

**Top receivers**

- BUF – Deonte Thompson – 7 receptions, 81 yards, TD
- NYJ – Robby Anderson – 4 receptions, 48 yards, TD

Coming off the convincing win against Oakland, the Bills traveled to New York for a Thursday Night rematch against their division rivals, the New York Jets. Though heavily favored to win, the Bills played poorly on defense and allowed the Jets to run for 194 yards and three rushing touchdowns. The offense surrendered three fumbles which ultimately influenced the course of the game, despite receivers Zay Jones and Deonte Thompson catching their first touchdowns as members of the Bills. With the loss, the Bills fell to 5–3.

==== Week 10: vs. New Orleans Saints ====
Week Ten: New Orleans Saints at Buffalo Bills – Game summary

Quarter	1	2	3	4	Total
**Saints**	7	10	20	10	**47**
Bills	3	0	0	7	**10**

at New Era Field, Orchard Park, New York

- Date: November 12
- Game time: 1:00 p.m.
- Game weather: 42 °F (6 °C), cloudy
- Game attendance: 67,501
- Referee: Terry McAulay
- TV announcers (Fox): Kenny Albert, Ronde Barber, and Kristina Pink
- Recap, Gamebook

Game information

**First quarter**

- BUF – Steven Hauschka 37-yard field goal, 10:58. Bills 3–0. **Drive: 9 plays, 57 yards, 4:02.**
- NO – Mark Ingram II 1-yard run (Wil Lutz kick), 6:18. Saints 7–3. **Drive: 9 plays, 75 yards, 4:40.**

**Second quarter**

- NO – Mark Ingram II 3-yard run (Wil Lutz kick), 9:03. Saints 14–3. **Drive: 8 plays, 48 yards, 4:47.**
- NO – Wil Lutz 23-yard field goal, 1:39. Saints 17–3. **Drive: 10 plays, 75 yards, 4:04.**

**Third quarter**

- NO – Alvin Kamara 5-yard run (Wil Lutz kick), 9:40. Saints 24–3. **Drive: 9 plays, 75 yards, 5:20.**
- NO – Mark Ingram II 3-yard run (kick failed), 8:24. Saints 30–3. **Drive: 1 play, 3 yards, 0:05.**
- NO – Drew Brees 7-yard run (Wil Lutz kick), 0:22. Saints 37–3. **Drive: 10 plays, 94 yards, 6:33.**

**Fourth quarter**

- NO – Wil Lutz 53-yard field goal, 4:53. Saints 40–3. **Drive: 14 plays, 38 yards, 9:25.**
- NO – Trey Edmunds 41-yard run (Wil Lutz kick), 3:04. Saints 47–3. **Drive: 2 plays, 44 yards, 0:51.**
- BUF – Nick O'Leary 7-yard pass from Nathan Peterman (Steven Hauschka kick), 1:54. Saints 47–10. **Drive: 6 plays, 75 yards, 1:10.**

**Top passers**

- NO – Drew Brees – 18/25, 184 yards
- BUF – Nathan Peterman – 7/10, 79 yards, TD

**Top rushers**

- NO – Mark Ingram II – 21 rushes, 131 yards, 3 TD
- BUF – LeSean McCoy – 8 rushes, 49 yards

**Top receivers**

- NO – Michael Thomas – 9 receptions, 117 yards
- BUF – Kelvin Benjamin – 3 receptions, 42 yards

For the second consecutive week, the Bills run defense under-performed, allowing 296 rushing yards and six rushing touchdowns against the New Orleans Saints. To make matters worse, the offense was unable to stay on the field, attaining only five first downs and a field goal prior to rookie quarterback Nathan Peterman replacing Tyrod Taylor late in the fourth quarter. With the blowout loss, the Bills fall to 5–4.

==== Week 11: at Los Angeles Chargers ====
Week Eleven: Buffalo Bills at Los Angeles Chargers – Game summary

Quarter	1	2	3	4	Total
Bills	7	0	3	14	**24**
**Chargers**	10	27	10	7	**54**

at StubHub Center, Carson, California

- Date: November 19
- Game time: 4:05 p.m. ET/1:05 p.m. PT
- Game weather: 76 °F (24 °C), partly cloudy
- Game attendance: 25,015
- Referee: John Parry
- TV announcers (Fox): Chris Myers, Daryl Johnston, and Laura Okmin
- Recap, Gamebook

Game information

**First quarter**

- LAC – Korey Toomer 59-yard interception return (Nick Novak kick), 11:44. Chargers 7–0. **Drive: 6 plays, 34 yards, 3:16.**
- BUF – LeSean McCoy 27-yard run (Steven Hauschka kick), 9:02. Tied 7–7. **Drive: 2 plays, 64 yards, 0:48.**
- LAC – Nick Novak 33-yard field goal, 3:57. Chargers 10–7. **Drive: 12 plays, 59 yards, 5:05.**

**Second quarter**

- LAC – Keenan Allen 21-yard pass from Philip Rivers (Nick Novak kick), 12:53. Chargers 17–7. **Drive: 6 plays, 46 yards, 3:16.**
- LAC – Keenan Allen 2-yard pass from Philip Rivers (Nick Novak kick), 10:32. Chargers 24–7. **Drive: 4 plays, 15 yards, 2:11.**
- LAC – Nick Novak 28-yard field goal, 4:55. Chargers 27–7. **Drive: 9 plays, 66 yards, 4:14.**
- LAC – Melvin Gordon 10-yard run (Nick Novak kick), 1:09. Chargers 34–7. **Drive: 5 plays, 57 yards, 2:37.**
- LAC – Nick Novak 39-yard field goal, 0:00. Chargers 37–7. **Drive: 6 plays, 33 yards, 0:35.**

**Third quarter**

- LAC – Nick Novak 28-yard field goal, 10:21. Chargers 40–7. **Drive: 11 plays, 65 yards, 4:39.**
- BUF – Steven Hauschka 50-yard field goal, 7:34. Chargers 40–10. **Drive: 8 plays, 46 yards, 2:47.**
- LAC – Melvin Ingram 39-yard fumble return (Nick Novak kick), 1:51. Chargers 47–10. **Drive: 8 plays, 22 yards, 2:49.**

**Fourth quarter**

- BUF – LeSean McCoy 12-yard pass from Tyrod Taylor (Steven Hauschka kick), 13:51. Chargers 47–17. **Drive: 8 plays, 78 yards, 3:00.**
- LAC – Austin Ekeler 21-yard run (Nick Novak kick), 7:57. Chargers 54–17. **Drive: 9 plays, 58 yards, 5:54.**
- BUF – Tyrod Taylor 2-yard run (Steven Hauschka kick), 4:49. Chargers 54–24. **Drive: 11 plays, 75 yards, 3:08.**

**Top passers**

- BUF – Tyrod Taylor – 15/25, 158 yards, TD
- LAC – Philip Rivers – 20/32, 251 yards, 2 TD

**Top rushers**

- BUF – LeSean McCoy – 13 rushes, 114 yards, TD
- LAC – Melvin Gordon – 20 rushes, 80 yards, TD

**Top receivers**

- BUF – Zay Jones – 4 receptions, 68 yards
- LAC – Keenan Allen – 12 receptions, 159 yards, 2 TD

Nathan Peterman started in Tyrod Taylor's place. Peterman was benched at halftime after going 6 of 14 for 66 yards with 5 interceptions.

==== Week 12: at Kansas City Chiefs ====
Week Twelve: Buffalo Bills at Kansas City Chiefs – Game summary

Quarter	1	2	3	4	Total
**Bills**	7	6	3	0	**16**
Chiefs	0	3	7	0	**10**

at Arrowhead Stadium, Kansas City, Missouri

- Date: November 26
- Game time: 1:00 p.m. ET/12:00 p.m. CT
- Game weather: 62 °F (17 °C), partly cloudy
- Game attendance: 74,929
- Referee: Bill Vinovich
- TV announcers (CBS): Greg Gumbel, Trent Green, and Jamie Erdahl
- Recap, Gamebook

Game information

**First quarter**

- BUF – Zay Jones 11-yard pass from Tyrod Taylor (Steven Hauschka kick), 1:29. **Drive: 9 plays, 58 yards, 4:24.** Bills 7–0.

**Second quarter**

- BUF – Steven Hauschka 34-yard field goal, 12:01. **Drive: 6 plays, 28 yards, 2:50.** Bills 10–0.
- KC – Harrison Butker 45-yard field goal, 1:44. **Drive: 5 plays, 32 yards, 1:46.** Bills 10–3.
- BUF – Steven Hauschka 56-yard field goal, 0:04. **Drive: 8 plays, 38 yards, 1:40.** Bills 13–3.

**Third quarter**

- KC – Albert Wilson 19-yard pass from Alex Smith (Harrison Butker kick), 9:19. **Drive: 9 plays, 85 yards, 5:41.** Bills 13–10.
- BUF – Steven Hauschka 49-yard field goal, 6:52. **Drive: 5 plays, 44 yards, 2:27.** Bills 16–10.

**Fourth quarter**

- No scoring plays.

**Top passers**

- BUF – Tyrod Taylor – 19/29, 183 yards, TD
- KC – Alex Smith – 23/36, 199 yards, TD, INT

**Top rushers**

- BUF – LeSean McCoy – 22 rushes, 49 yards
- KC – Alex Smith – 5 rushes, 35 yards

**Top receivers**

- BUF – Charles Clay – 4 receptions, 60 yards
- KC – Tyreek Hill – 7 receptions, 41 yards

After consecutive weeks of playing bad defense, the Bills were finally able to rebound, holding Kansas City to just 10 points as Tyrod Taylor returned to the starting lineup on offense. Tre'Davious White sealed the win for Buffalo in the fourth quarter with an interception off Chiefs quarterback Alex Smith. With the win, the Bills snap their three-game losing streak and improve to 6–5.

==== Week 13: vs. New England Patriots ====
Week Thirteen: New England Patriots at Buffalo Bills – Game summary

Quarter	1	2	3	4	Total
**Patriots**	3	6	14	0	**23**
Bills	0	3	0	0	**3**

at New Era Field, Orchard Park, New York

- Date: December 3
- Game time: 1:00 p.m.
- Game weather: 48 °F (9 °C), mostly cloudy
- Game attendance: 68,499
- Referee: Gene Steratore
- TV announcers (CBS): Jim Nantz, Tony Romo, and Tracy Wolfson
- Recap, Gamebook

Game information

**First quarter**

- NE – Stephen Gostkowski 50-yard field goal, 1:30. Patriots 3–0. **Drive: 14 plays, 59 yards, 6:21.**

**Second quarter**

- NE – Stephen Gostkowski 31-yard field goal, 6:26. Patriots 6–0. **Drive: 7 plays, 56 yards, 3:21.**
- BUF – Steven Hauschka 49-yard field goal, 3:205. Patriots 6–3. **Drive: 7 plays, 45 yards, 3:21.**
- NE – Stephen Gostkowski 39-yard field goal, 0:15. Patriots 9–3. **Drive: 10 plays, 55 yards, 2:50.**

**Third quarter**

- NE – Rex Burkhead 1-yard run (Stephen Gostkowski kick), 9:02. Patriots 16–3. **Drive: 10 plays, 70 yards, 5:58.**
- NE – Rex Burkhead 14-yard run (Stephen Gostkowski kick), 1:08. Patriots 23–3. **Drive: 9 plays, 78 yards, 4:38.**

**Fourth quarter**

- No scoring plays.

**Top passers**

- NE – Tom Brady – 21/30, 258 yards, INT
- BUF – Tyrod Taylor – 9/18, 65 yards, INT

**Top rushers**

- NE – Dion Lewis – 15 rushes, 92 yards
- BUF – LeSean McCoy – 15 rushes, 93 yards

**Top receivers**

- NE – Rob Gronkowski – 9 receptions, 147 yards
- BUF – Zay Jones – 2 receptions, 22 yards

Though Buffalo was able to hold the potent New England Patriots offense to just nine first-half points, it was not enough to beat them, as the Patriots won 23–3. Multiple Bills starters were injured, including Tyrod Taylor and Shaq Lawson. Perhaps the defining moment of the game occurred in the fourth quarter, when Tre'Davious White intercepted a pass intended for Rob Gronkowski. Upset that no pass interference penalty was called on White, Gronkowski reacted by jumping elbow-first onto White, who was still on the ground. The play resulted in White landing on the concussion protocol and Gronkowski receiving a one-game suspension as a result of his actions.

==== Week 14: vs. Indianapolis Colts ====
Week Fourteen: Indianapolis Colts at Buffalo Bills – Game summary

Quarter	1	2	3	4	OT	Total
Colts	0	0	0	7	0	**7**
**Bills**	0	7	0	0	6	**13**

at New Era Field, Orchard Park, New York

- Date: December 10
- Game time: 1:00 p.m.
- Game weather: 32 °F (0 °C), heavy lake effect snow
- Game attendance: 60,222
- Referee: Brad Allen
- TV announcers (CBS): Spero Dedes, Adam Archuleta, and Steve Tasker
- Recap, Gamebook

Game information

**First quarter**

- No scoring plays.

**Second quarter**

- BUF – Kelvin Benjamin 8-yard pass from Nathan Peterman (Steven Hauschka kick), 0:27. Bills 7–0. **Drive: 7 plays, 80 yards, 1:15.**

**Third quarter**

- No scoring plays.

**Fourth quarter**

- IND – Jack Doyle 3-yard pass from Jacoby Brissett (Adam Vinatieri kick), 1:16. Tied 7–7. **Drive: 19 plays, 77 yards, 9:53.**

**Overtime**

- BUF – LeSean McCoy 21-yard run, 1:33. Bills 13–7. **Drive: 6 plays, 65 yards, 0:52.**

**Top passers**

- IND – Jacoby Brissett – 11/22, 69 yards, TD
- BUF – Nathan Peterman – 5/10, 57 yards, TD

**Top rushers**

- IND – Frank Gore – 36 rushes, 130 yards
- BUF – LeSean McCoy – 32 rushes, 156 yards, TD

**Top receivers**

- IND – Marlon Mack – 2 receptions, 21 yards
- BUF – Kelvin Benjamin – 3 receptions, 38 yards, TD

The game against Indianapolis, called the "Snow Bowl" by the media, was notable for being held in the midst of a lake-effect snow storm that left over a foot of snow on the stadium's turf. The heavy snow and strong winds caused severe complications, making it difficult for CBS to televise the game due to low visibility and prompting both teams to run the ball far more often and make more fourth-down conversion attempts than would otherwise have been attempted, since kicking the ball was less reliable. The amount of snow on the ground did prove to be an advantage for the punters, since the ball did not bounce upon landing, making precision coffin corner punts easier. Nathan Peterman made his second start with Tyrod Taylor injured, and was able to post a respectable performance before leaving in the third quarter with a concussion. The low-scoring game went into overtime, and did not end until LeSean McCoy rushed for a touchdown with under two minutes to go in the extra period. The Bills improved to 7–6 with the win.

The Bills would not win another overtime game until 2026.

==== Week 15: vs. Miami Dolphins ====
Week Fifteen: Miami Dolphins at Buffalo Bills – Game summary

Quarter	1	2	3	4	Total
Dolphins	3	3	0	10	**16**
**Bills**	7	14	3	0	**24**

at New Era Field, Orchard Park, New York

- Date: December 17
- Game time: 1:00 p.m.
- Game weather: 22 °F (−6 °C), mostly cloudy
- Game attendance: 62,202
- Referee: Jerome Boger
- TV announcers (CBS): Beth Mowins and Jay Feely
- Recap, Gamebook

Game information

**First quarter**

- BUF – LeSean McCoy 4-yard run (Steven Hauschka kick), 10:12. Bills 7–0. **Drive: 10 plays, 81 yards, 4:48.**
- MIA – Cody Parkey 28-yard field goal, 3:16. Bills 7–3. **Drive: 7 plays, 50 yards, 3:51.**

**Second quarter**

- MIA – Cody Parkey 41-yard field goal, 9:15. Bills 7–6. **Drive: 14 plays, 71 yards, 7:04.**
- BUF – LeSean McCoy 16-yard pass from Tyrod Taylor (Steven Hauschka kick), 6:05. Bills 14–6. **Drive: 8 plays, 75 yards, 3:10.**
- BUF – Tyrod Taylor 9-yard run (Steven Hauschka kick), 0:33. Bills 21–6. **Drive: 8 plays, 80 yards, 1:50.**

**Third quarter**

- BUF – Stephen Hasuschka 34-yard field goal, 5:40. Bills 24–6. **Drive: 5 plays, 7 yards, 2:06.**

**Fourth quarter**

- MIA – Kenyan Drake 1-yard run (Cody Parkey kick), 7:57. Bills 24–13. **Drive: 6 plays, 13 yards, 1:35.**
- MIA – Cody Parkey 26-yard field goal, 0:39. Bills 24–16. **Drive: 17 plays, 78 yards, 3:54.**

**Top passers**

- MIA – Jay Cutler – 28/49, 274 yards, 3 INT
- BUF – Tyrod Taylor – 17/29, 224 yards, TD

**Top rushers**

- MIA – Kenyan Drake – 16 rushes, 78 yards, TD
- BUF – LeSean McCoy – 20 rushes, 50 yards, TD

**Top receivers**

- MIA – Jarvis Landry – 10 receptions, 99 yards
- BUF – Charles Clay – 5 receptions, 68 yards

LeSean McCoy surpassed 10,000 rushing yards during the game, becoming just the 30th NFL running back to do so.

==== Week 16: at New England Patriots ====
Week Sixteen: Buffalo Bills at New England Patriots – Game summary

Quarter	1	2	3	4	Total
Bills	3	10	3	0	**16**
**Patriots**	0	13	10	14	**37**

at Gillette Stadium, Foxborough, Massachusetts

- Date: December 24
- Game time: 1:00 p.m.
- Game weather: 35 °F (2 °C), cloudy
- Game attendance: 65,878
- Referee: Craig Wrolstad
- TV announcers (CBS): Jim Nantz, Tony Romo, and Tracy Wolfson
- Recap, Gamebook

Game information

**First quarter**

- BUF – Steven Hauschka 41-yard field goal, 5:30. Bills 3–0. **Drive: 16 plays, 47 yards, 8:04.**

**Second quarter**

- NE – Stephen Gostkowski 21-yard field goal, 14:14. Tied 3–3. **Drive: 13 plays, 79 yards, 6:16.**
- BUF – Jordan Poyer 19-yard interception return (Steven Hauschka kick), 10:28. Bills 10–3.
- NE – Rob Gronkowski 17-yard pass from Tom Brady (Stephen Gostkowski kick), 7:06. Tied 10–10. **Drive: 9 plays, 75 yards, 3:22.**
- NE – Stephen Gostkowski 40-yard field goal, 1:55. Patriots 13–10. **Drive: 7 plays, 66 yards, 3:00.**
- BUF – Steven Hauschka 23-yard field goal, 0:00. Tied 13–13. **Drive: 13 plays, 71 yards, 1:55.**

**Third quarter**

- BUF – Steven Hauschka 30-yard field goal, 10:21. Bills 16–13. **Drive: 10 plays, 63 yards, 4:39.**
- NE – Stephen Gostkowski 34-yard field goal, 5:08. Tied 16–16. **Drive: 13 plays, 59 yards, 5:13.**
- NE – Mike Gillislee 1-yard run (Stephen Gostkowski kick), 0:55. Patriots 23–16. **Drive: 4 plays, 65 yards, 1:59.**
- NE – Dion Lewis 12-yard pass from Tom Brady (Stephen Gostkowski kick), 9:27. Patriots 30–16. **Drive: 7 plays, 60 yards, 3:41.**

**Fourth quarter**

- NE – Dion Lewis 12-yard pass from Tom Brady (Stephen Gostkowski kick), 9:27. Patriots 30–16. **Drive: 7 plays, 60 yards, 3:41.**
- NE – Dion Lewis 4-yard run (Stephen Gostkowski kick), 3:58. Patriots 37–16. **Drive: 8 plays, 54 yards, 3:25.**

**Top passers**

- BUF – Tyrod Taylor – 21/38, 281 yards
- NE – Tom Brady – 21/28, 224 yards, 2 TD, INT

**Top rushers**

- BUF – LeSean McCoy – 17 rushes, 71 yards
- NE – Dion Lewis – 24 rushes, 129 yards, TD

**Top receivers**

- BUF – Deonte Thompson – 4 receptions, 91 yards
- NE – Rob Gronkowski – 5 receptions, 67 yards, TD

A play near the end of the second quarter proved to be particularly controversial. Receiver Kelvin Benjamin caught a pass in the closing seconds of the second quarter that was initially ruled a touchdown by the on-field officials; however, the league's replay official, Alberto Riveron, determined that Benjamin did not have control of the ball until after his foot left the turf and Riveron overturned the touchdown, forcing the Bills to settle for a field goal. Bills owner Terrence Pegula indicated he would protest the decision. Though the first half was close, the Patriots outscored the Bills 24–3 in the second half, culminating in a 37–16 loss for Buffalo, and a 2–0 season sweep for New England.

==== Week 17: at Miami Dolphins ====
Week Seventeen: Buffalo Bills at Miami Dolphins – Game summary

Quarter	1	2	3	4	Total
**Bills**	7	3	9	3	**22**
Dolphins	0	0	3	13	**16**

at Hard Rock Stadium, Miami Gardens, Florida

- Date: December 31
- Game time: 4:25 p.m.
- Game weather: 71 °F (22 °C), clear
- Game attendance: 65,571
- Referee: Jeff Triplette
- TV announcers (CBS): Andrew Catalon and James Lofton
- Recap, Gamebook

Game information

**First quarter**

- BUF – Nick O'Leary 26-yard pass from Tyrod Taylor (Steven Hauschka kick), 10:14. Bills 7–0. **Drive: 7 plays, 72 yards, 3:12.**

**Second quarter**

- BUF – Steven Hauschka 23-yard field goal, 14:46. Bills 10–0. '**Drive: 11 plays, 80 yards, 4:52.**

**Third quarter**

- BUF – Steven Hauschka 49-yard field goal, 10:17. Bills 13–0. **Drive: 9 plays, 42 yards, 4:43.**
- BUF – Kyle Williams 1-yard run (run failed), 7:08. Bills 19–0. **Drive: 5 plays, 50 yards, 1:35.**
- MIA – Cody Parkey 36-yard field goal, 2:30. Bills 19–3. **Drive: 11 plays, 57 yards, 4:38.**

**Fourth quarter**

- BUF – Steven Hauschka 33-yard field goal, 11:41. Bills 22–3. **Drive: 10 plays, 60 yards, 5:49.**
- MIA – Jarvis Landry 1-yard pass from David Fales (pass failed), 6:16. Bills 22–9. **Drive: 10 plays, 75 yards, 5:25.**
- MIA – David Fales 1-yard run (Cody Parkey kick), 1:56. Bills 22–16. **Drive: 10 plays, 68 yards, 2:54.**

**Top passers**

- BUF – Tyrod Taylor – 19/27, 204 yards, TD
- MIA – David Fales – 29/42, 265 yards, TD, INT

**Top rushers**

- BUF – Marcus Murphy – 7 rushes, 41 yards
- MIA – Kenyan Drake – 14 rushes, 75 yards

**Top receivers**

- BUF – Charles Clay – 6 receptions, 64 yards
- MIA – Jarvis Landry – 9 receptions, 92 yards, TD

The Bills started off the game up 10–0 by halftime and 19–0 by the time the Dolphins added a field goal. The Bills then fought off a comeback, including a fight that saw Jarvis Landry and Kenyan Drake get ejected. After a Miami touchdown that left them down six, history from the Bills–Dolphins game two weeks prior repeated itself: the Dolphins recovered an onside kick, then threw an interception with a minute to go to seal the game. With the win, Buffalo improved to 9–7, earning its first winning season since 2014.

At the end of the game, the Bills were still waiting for the final outcome between the Cincinnati Bengals and the Baltimore Ravens to determine their fates for the season. With 49 seconds left in that game, Bengals quarterback Andy Dalton threw a 49-yard go-ahead touchdown pass to Tyler Boyd on a 4th-and-12 play to go up 31–27. The Ravens were unable to respond on the following drive, sealing the win for the Bengals. The Bengals' victory ended the Ravens season with a 9–7 record. This allowed the Bills, also 9–7, to enter the playoffs with the tiebreaker over the Ravens, thus reaching the postseason for the first time in 17 years.

After the game, thousands of grateful Bills fans donated money to Dalton's personal charity. Most of the donations were in $17 increments in honor of the Bills breaking their 17-year playoff drought. In the first 72 hours after the game, over 11,000 people donated a combined over $250,000 to the Andy & Jordan Dalton Foundation, while Tyler Boyd's charity of choice, the Western Pennsylvania Youth Athletic Association, received $50,000 in donations from Bills fans. Relatedly, the Bills organization announced that they were sending Buffalo wings from Duff's Famous Wings to the Bengals organization, where they were consumed by residents of The Children's Home of Cincinnati. Retired punter Brian Moorman, who punted for the Bills through most of the 17-year playoff drought, also saw an uptick in $17 donations to his charity, the P.U.N.T. Foundation, which has extensive operations in Western New York.

As a result of Buffalo making it into the NFL playoffs for the first time since 1999, ending the longest active playoff drought in all of North American professional sports, the Cleveland Browns then held the longest NFL postseason drought, 15 seasons at the time and eventually 17 seasons, until they reached the playoffs in 2020. MLB's Seattle Mariners then held the longest such drought in all North American sports at 17 seasons at the time, and eventually 21 years, until they reached the playoffs in 2022.

=== Standings ===
==== Division ====
AFC East
	W	L	T	PCT	DIV	CONF	PF	PA	STK
^{(1)} New England Patriots	13	3	0	.813	5–1	10–2	458	296	W3
^{(6)} Buffalo Bills	9	7	0	.563	3–3	7–5	302	359	W1
Miami Dolphins	6	10	0	.375	2–4	5–7	281	393	L3
New York Jets	5	11	0	.313	2–4	5–7	298	382	L4

==== Conference ====
AFC
#	Team	Division	W	L	T	PCT	DIV	CONF	SOS	SOV	STK
**Division leaders**
1 (Note: New England claimed the No. 1 seed over Pittsburgh based on head-to-head victory.)	New England Patriots	East	13	3	0	.813	5–1	10–2	.484	.466	W3
2	Pittsburgh Steelers	North	13	3	0	.813	6–0	10–2	.453	.423	W2
3 (Note: Jacksonville claimed the No. 3 seed over Kansas City based on conference record.)	Jacksonville Jaguars	South	10	6	0	.625	4–2	9–3	.434	.394	L2
4	Kansas City Chiefs	West	10	6	0	.625	5–1	8–4	.477	.481	W4
**Wild Cards**
5 (Note: Tennessee finished ahead of Buffalo, Baltimore and Los Angeles Chargers based on conference record, claiming the No. 5 seed. Buffalo and Baltimore finished ahead of Los Angeles Chargers based on conference record. Buffalo claimed the No. 6 seed over Baltimore based on strength of victory.)	Tennessee Titans	South	9	7	0	.563	5–1	8–4	.434	.396	W1
6	Buffalo Bills	East	9	7	0	.563	3–3	7–5	.492	.396	W1
**Did not qualify for the postseason**
7	Baltimore Ravens	North	9	7	0	.563	3–3	7–5	.441	.299	L1
8	Los Angeles Chargers	West	9	7	0	.563	3–3	6–6	.457	.347	W2
9	Cincinnati Bengals	North	7	9	0	.438	3–3	6–6	.465	.321	W2
10 (Note: Oakland finished ahead of Miami based on head-to-head victory.)	Oakland Raiders	West	6	10	0	.375	2–4	5–7	.512	.396	L4
11	Miami Dolphins	East	6	10	0	.375	2–4	5–7	.543	.531	L3
12 (Note: Denver finished ahead of the New York Jets based on head-to-head victory.)	Denver Broncos	West	5	11	0	.313	2–4	4–8	.492	.413	L2
13	New York Jets	East	5	11	0	.313	2–4	5–7	.520	.438	L4
14 (Note: Indianapolis finished ahead of Houston based on head-to-head sweep.)	Indianapolis Colts	South	4	12	0	.250	2–4	3–9	.480	.219	W1
15	Houston Texans	South	4	12	0	.250	1–5	3–9	.516	.375	L6
16	Cleveland Browns	North	0	16	0	.000	0–6	0–12	.520	–	L16
**Tiebreakers** (Note: When breaking ties for three or more teams under the NFL's rules, they are first broken within divisions, then comparing only the highest ranked remaining team from each division.)

== Postseason ==
=== Schedule ===
Round	Date	Opponent	Result	Record	Venue	Recap
Wild Card	January 7, 2018	at Jacksonville Jaguars (3)	L 3–10	0–1	EverBank Field	Recap

=== Game summaries ===
==== AFC Wild Card Playoffs: at (3) Jacksonville Jaguars ====
AFC Wild Card Playoffs: (6) Buffalo Bills at (3) Jacksonville Jaguars – Game summary

Quarter	1	2	3	4	Total
Bills	0	3	0	0	3
Jaguars	0	3	7	0	10

at EverBank Field, Jacksonville, Florida

- Date: January 7, 2018
- Game time: 1:05 p.m. EST
- Game weather: 53 °F (12 °C), sunny
- Game attendance: 69,442
- Referee: John Hussey
- TV announcers (CBS): Jim Nantz, Tony Romo, Tracy Wolfson and Jay Feely
- Recap, Game Book

Game information

First quarter

- No scoring plays.

Second quarter

- BUF – Steven Hauschka 31-yard field goal, 1:53. Bills 3–0. Drive: 18 plays, 71 yards, 8:06.
- JAX – Josh Lambo 44-yard field goal, 0:07. Tied 3–3. Drive: 6 plays, 27 yards, 0:38.

Third quarter

- JAX – Ben Koyack 1-yard pass from Blake Bortles (Josh Lambo kick), 0:48. Jaguars 10–3. Drive: 15 plays, 86 yards, 8:52.

Fourth quarter

- No scoring plays.

Top passers

- BUF – Tyrod Taylor – 17/37, 134 yards, INT
- JAX – Blake Bortles – 12/23, 87 yards, TD

Top rushers

- BUF – LeSean McCoy – 19 rushes, 75 yards
- JAX – Blake Bortles – 10 rushes, 88 yards

Top receivers

- BUF – LeSean McCoy – 6 receptions, 44 yards
- JAX – Dede Westbrook – 5 receptions, 48 yards

The Bills were looking to win their first playoff game since 1995, as they faced the #3-seeded Jacksonville Jaguars, another team that had recently ended a lengthy playoff drought. Despite taking a 3–0 lead shortly before halftime on a kick by Steven Hauschka, the Jaguars would rally for the victory in a hard-fought defensive game, only sealing the victory with an interception by Jalen Ramsey on the Bills' final drive.
