= Kelvin Benjamin =

American football player (born 1991)

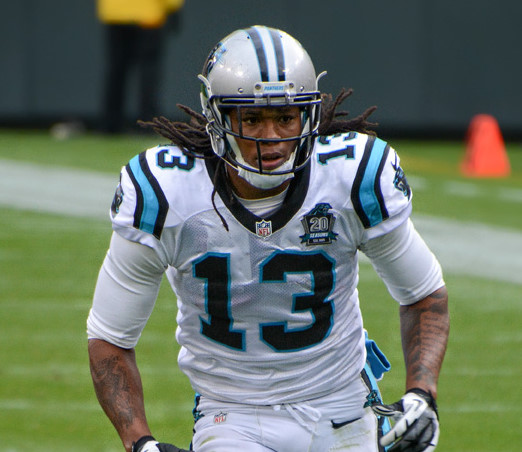
- Benjamin with the Carolina Panthers in 2014

No. 13, 81
- Position: Wide receiver

Personal information
- Born: February 5, 1991 (age 35); Belle Glade, Florida, U.S.
- Listed height: 6 ft 5 in (1.96 m)
- Listed weight: 245 lb (111 kg)

Career information
- High school: Glades Central (Belle Glade)
- College: Florida State (2011–2013)
- NFL draft: 2014: 1st round, 28th overall pick

Career history
- Carolina Panthers (2014–2017); Buffalo Bills (2017–2018); Kansas City Chiefs (2018); New York Giants (2021)*
- * Offseason or practice squad member only

Awards and highlights
- BCS national champion (2013); First-team All-American (2013); Second-team All-ACC (2013)

Career NFL statistics
- Receptions: 209
- Receiving yards: 3,021
- Receiving touchdowns: 20
- Stats at Pro Football Reference

Kelvin Benjamin (born February 5, 1991) is an American former professional football player who was a wide receiver in the National Football League (NFL). He played college football for the Florida State Seminoles and was selected by the Carolina Panthers in the first round of the 2014 NFL draft. He also played for the Buffalo Bills and Kansas City Chiefs.

After totaling over 1,000 receiving yards in his rookie season, Benjamin missed his sophomore year with a torn ACL. He returned in 2016 and had 941 receiving yards and seven touchdowns. Midway through 2017, Benjamin was traded to the Bills and appeared in six games with the team. With his play continuing to decline and his effort being called into question, the team released Benjamin during the 2018 season. He subsequently signed with the Chiefs but made just two catches in three regular season games. He did not appear in the team's playoff run and was eventually cut.

== Early life ==
Born and raised in Belle Glade, Florida, Benjamin was born to an American mother and a Jamaican father who was deported to Jamaica when Benjamin was very young. As a middle schooler he spent half of his years in a juvenile detention center. After he got out of the juvenile detention center, Benjamin shifted his focus on football. He had to repeat both 3rd and 7th grades, however, which caused him to finish high school at the age of 20, the age at which he would be considered ineligible. Benjamin attended Glades Central High School in Belle Glade, Florida, where he played football, basketball and ran track. In football, he played as a wide receiver. He was named First-team All-Palm Beach County by Sun-Sentinel and was selected to the Palm Beach Post All-Area First-team. As a senior, he hauled in 30 catches for 551 yards with six touchdowns, although he just played in eight games. In track & field, Benjamin competed in the jumping events. He got a personal-best jump of 1.84 meters in the high jump at the 2009 FHSAA 2A District 13, where he tied for third place. At the 2010 Glades Central Invitational, he took gold in the long jump event, recording a career-best leap of 6.48 meters (21'3").

Regarded as a four-star recruit by Rivals.com, Benjamin was ranked as the No. 7 wide receiver and the No. 60 overall player nationally in his class. Scout.com ranked him as the No. 12 receiver in the nation, while ESPN.com had him as the No. 23. According to 247Sports.com, he was the No. 13 wide receiver and the No. 89 player nationally. He chose Florida State University over scholarship offers from Auburn, Florida, Miami (FL), and Virginia Tech, among others.

College recruiting
Name	Hometown	School	Height	Weight	40^{‡}	Commit date
Kelvin Benjamin; WR	Belle Glade, Florida	Glades Central High School	6 ft 5 in (1.96 m)	210 lb (95 kg)	4.60	Jan 9, 2011
Kelvin Benjamin; WR	Recruit ratings: Scout: Rivals: 247Sports: (80)					
Overall recruit ranking: Scout: 23 (WR) Rivals: 8 (WR), 60 (National), 16 (FL)
‡ Refers to 40-yard dash; Note: In many cases, Scout, Rivals, 247Sports, On3, and ESPN may conflict in their listings of height, weight and 40 time.; In these cases, the average was taken. ESPN grades are on a 100-point scale.; Sources: "2011 Florida State Football Commitments". Rivals.; "2011 Florida State Football Recruiting Commits". Scout.; "Scout.com Team Recruiting Rankings". Scout.; "2011 Team Ranking". Rivals.com.

== College career ==
After being redshirted in 2011, Benjamin played in all 14 games in 2012, recording 30 receptions for 495 yards and four touchdowns. As a sophomore in 2013, he had 54 receptions for 1,011 yards and 15 touchdowns, including the game-winning touchdown against Auburn in the BCS National Championship with 13 seconds remaining. Sports Illustrated named Benjamin to their All-American first-team and he was also selected to the All-Atlantic Coast Conference (ACC) Second-team by the coaches and All-ACC Third-team by media. After the season, Benjamin decided to forgo his final two years of eligibility to enter the 2014 NFL draft.

== Professional career ==
=== Pre-draft ===
Despite forgoing two years of eligibility, Benjamin was still given a first-round grade by the NFL Draft Advisory Board, which is typically conservative with underclassmen draft entrants, and was widely considered one of the top wide receivers in the 2014 NFL draft. Benjamin's size, physicality, and high-pointing ability drew parallels to players including Alshon Jeffery and Plaxico Burress. While many scouts were concerned about his hands and a current lack of precise route running at this point, many projected him as a first-round pick due to his potential. Benjamin was selected by the Carolina Panthers with the 28th pick of the first round. NFL Media analyst Mike Mayock praised the Panthers selection of Benjamin after it occurred. "He's 6-foot-5, 240 pounds with 35-inch arms, and you're talking about a catching radius." Mayock then went on to compare Benjamin to other college wide receivers that only had one year of college production. "However, there's one thing about wide receivers with only one year of college production (like Benjamin at FSU) and it's a little sobering when you look at the names on that list: Stephen Hill, Greg Little, Devin Thomas, Anthony Gonzalez," Mayock said.

Pre-draft measurables
Height	Weight	Arm length	Hand span	Wingspan	40-yard dash	10-yard split	20-yard split	20-yard shuttle	Three-cone drill	Vertical jump	Broad jump	Bench press	Wonderlic
6 ft 5 in (1.96 m)	240 lb (109 kg)	34 7/8 in (0.89 m)	10 1/4 in (0.26 m)	6 ft 11 in (2.11 m)	4.61 s	1.65 s	2.63 s	4.39 s	7.33 s	33.0 in (0.84 m)	9 ft 11 in (3.02 m)	13 reps	7
All values from NFL Combine or Florida State Pro Day

=== Carolina Panthers ===
==== 2014 ====
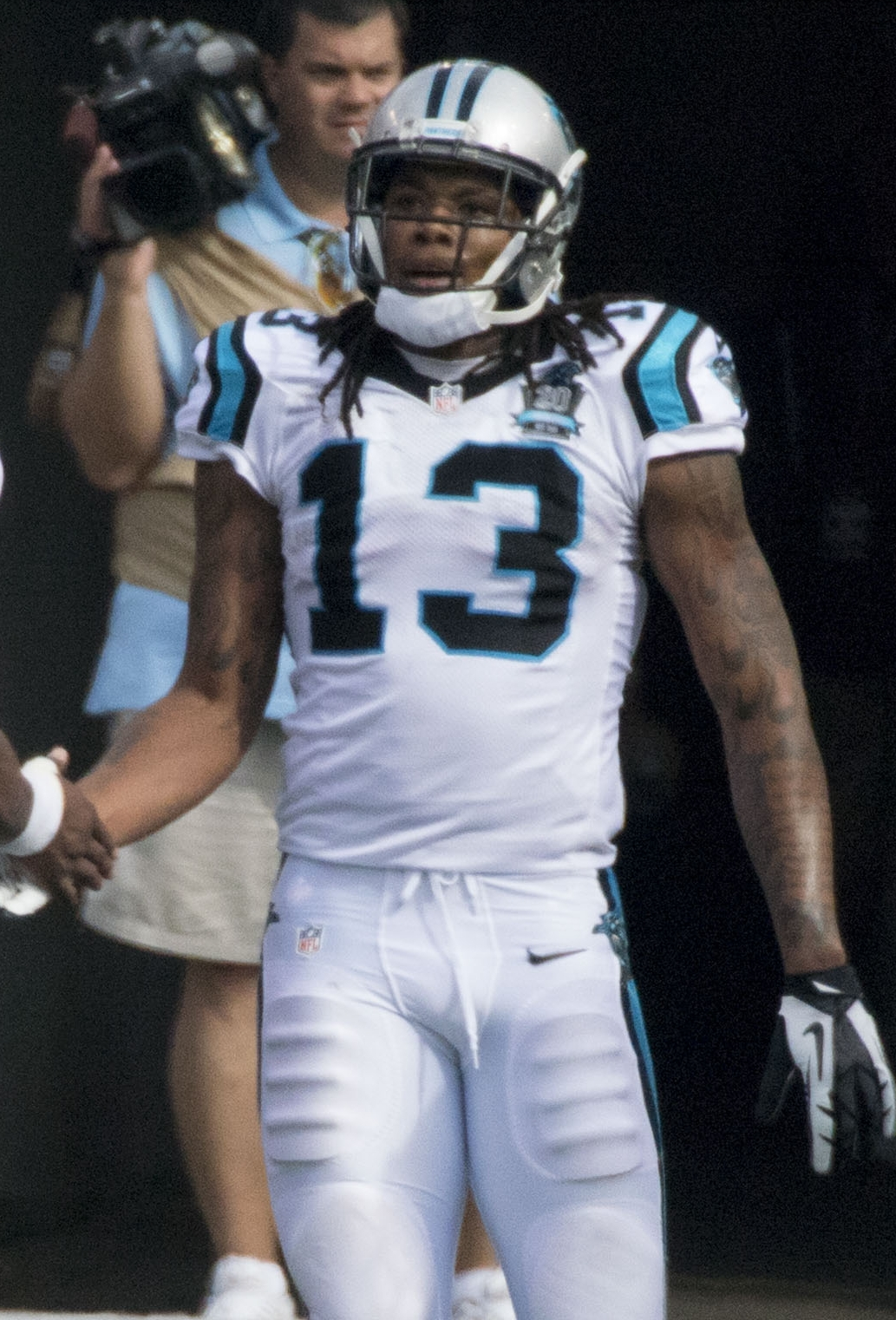
Benjamin with the Panthers in 2014

After losing Steve Smith, Brandon LaFell, Ted Ginn Jr., and Domenik Hixon in the offseason, the Panthers chose Benjamin high in the draft. Panthers general manager Dave Gettleman said to reporters Benjamin's tape reminded him of a young Plaxico Burress. During training camp and the preseason, Benjamin was in a competition for the Panthers No. 1 receiver spot with former Pittsburgh Steelers wide receiver Jerricho Cotchery. On June 4, 2014, Benjamin signed a four-year $7.66 million deal.

During his debut performance on September 7, 2014, against the Tampa Bay Buccaneers, Benjamin recorded six receptions for 92 yards and one touchdown; quarterback Derek Anderson had a 152.1 quarterback rating when throwing towards Benjamin. With his touchdown reception, Benjamin joined Randy Moss, Calvin Johnson, A. J. Green, Demaryius Thomas, Percy Harvin, Brandin Cooks, and Mike Williams as the only rookie first-round wide receivers to catch a touchdown reception during their debut performance. Additionally, Benjamin's 92 yards were the seventh-most for a wide receiver in the first game of his rookie season behind Anquan Boldin, Randy Moss, Eddie Royal, DeSean Jackson, Julian Edelman, Demaryius Thomas, and Allen Hurns. Benjamin was voted the Pepsi NFL Rookie of the Week for his Week 1 performance. In Week 3 against the Pittsburgh Steelers, Benjamin recorded his first 100-yard game, catching 8 passes for 115 yards and one touchdown.

With a touchdown reception against the Baltimore Ravens in Week 4, Benjamin became the only rookie wide receiver in the past 10 years to record a 25+ yard receiving touchdown in three of the team's first four games, joining Randy Moss, who accomplished the feat in 1998. Furthermore, Benjamin and Marques Colston were the only rookies in 30 years to gain 300 receiving yards and catch three touchdown passes in their team's first four games. On October 2, 2014, it was announced that the NFL named Benjamin the NFL Offensive Rookie of the Month for September.

In the Panthers Week 8 matchup against the defending champion Seattle Seahawks, Benjamin racked up 94 yards against the All-Pro cornerback Richard Sherman. Benjamin finished the season with 73 receptions, 1,008 receiving yards, and nine receiving touchdowns. He and teammate Greg Olsen became the first receiving duo to amass 1,000 receiving yards in the same year for the Panthers since Muhsin Muhammad and Patrick Jeffers in 1999. Benjamin became only the 11th rookie wide receiver in NFL history to record a 1,000-yard season. During the Panthers playoff loss to the Seattle Seahawks in the Divisional Round, Benjamin recorded seven catches for 75 receiving yards and two receiving touchdowns.

==== 2015 ====
Benjamin tore his ACL in a joint training camp practice with the Miami Dolphins, ending his 2015 season. In that season the Panthers made it to Super Bowl 50 but lost 24-10 to the Denver Broncos.

==== 2016 ====
After missing the whole 2015 season with a torn ACL, Benjamin returned in the season opener game against the defending Super Bowl champion Denver Broncos. Benjamin had six receptions for 91 yards and a touchdown the Panthers' 21-20 loss at Denver, and followed that with seven receptions for 108 yards and two touchdowns against the San Francisco 49ers. He had no receptions in Week 3, and though he caught a pass in every remaining game that season, his yardage totals were erratic and never again broke 100. Nevertheless, he ended the season leading the team with seven touchdown receptions, and second to tight end Greg Olsen with 63 receptions for 941 yards.

==== 2017 ====
On May 2, 2017, the Panthers exercised Benjamin's fifth-year option.

=== Buffalo Bills ===
==== 2017 ====
Benjamin signing an autograph at Bills training camp in August 2018

On October 31, 2017, the Panthers traded Benjamin to the Buffalo Bills for a 2018 third-round draft pick (later used to select Rashaan Gaulden) and the seventh round draft pick that was previously acquired from the Los Angeles Chargers (used on Andre Smith). Benjamin suffered a torn meniscus in the right knee against the Chargers. The injury sidelined Benjamin for two weeks. Upon returning against the Indianapolis Colts, Benjamin scored his first touchdown with the Bills, an 8-yard pass from Nathan Peterman. However, he tweaked his injured knee in the third quarter and left the game afterwards. Against the New England Patriots in Week 16, Benjamin had a touchdown catch overturned due to a controversial ruling. He finished the game with five receptions for 70 yards, but the Bills wound up losing 37–16. He finished the 2017 season with 48 receptions for 692 receiving yards and three receiving touchdowns.

==== 2018 ====
On December 4, 2018, Benjamin was released by the Bills. He finished the season playing in 12 games, starting 10, recording 23 receptions for 354 yards and just one touchdown. Prior to his release Benjamin had a catch rate of 35 percent, the worst in the league. It was also noted by fans and sports commentators that his effort had noticeably declined.

=== Kansas City Chiefs ===
Two days after being released by the Bills, Benjamin signed a one-year deal with the Kansas City Chiefs. Benjamin made just two catches in three regular season games with the team, and did not appear in their two playoff games.

=== New York Giants ===
Benjamin signed with the New York Giants on May 16, 2021. He worked out at the tight end spot during the team's minicamp. He was cut on July 28 before the team's first official practice. He blamed Giants coach Joe Judge following his release, feeling he was not given a proper chance and calling his tenure in New York a "hoax".

== NFL career statistics ==
=== Regular season ===
Year	Team	Games		Receiving					Fumbles	
Year	Team	GP	GS	Rec	Yds	Avg	Lng	TD	Fum	Lost
2014	CAR	16	15	73	1,008	13.8	51	9	1	1
2015	CAR	0	0	Did not play due to injury						
2016	CAR	16	13	63	941	14.9	50	7	1	1
2017	CAR	8	8	32	475	14.8	43	2	0	0
2017	BUF	6	6	16	217	13.7	35	1	0	0
2018	BUF	12	10	23	354	15.4	40	1	0	0
2018	KC	3	0	2	26	13.0	17	0	0	0
Total		61	52	209	3,021	14.5	51	20	2	2

=== Postseason ===
Year	Team	Games		Receiving					Fumbles	
Year	Team	GP	GS	Rec	Yds	Avg	Lng	TD	Fum	Lost
2014	CAR	2	2	11	108	9.8	28	2	0	0
2015	CAR	0	0	Did not play due to injury						
2017	BUF	1	1	1	9	9.0	9	0	0	0
2018	KC	0	0	Did not play						
Total		3	3	12	117	9.8	28	2	0	0

== Career accomplishments ==
=== Panthers franchise records ===
As of 2026's NFL off-season, Benjamin held at least five Panthers franchise records, including:

- Receiving touchdowns: playoff game (Two on January 10, 2015, at the Seattle Seahawks; with Steve Smith Sr.)
- Receiving touchdowns: rookie season (nine in 2014)
- Receiving yards per game: rookie season (63.0 in 2014)
- Total touchdowns: playoff game (Two on January 10, 2015, at the Seattle Seahawks; with Steve Smith Sr. ×2, Jonathan Stewart, and Cam Newton)
- 100+ yard receiving games: rookie season (3)
