= Nick O'Leary =

American football player (born 1992)

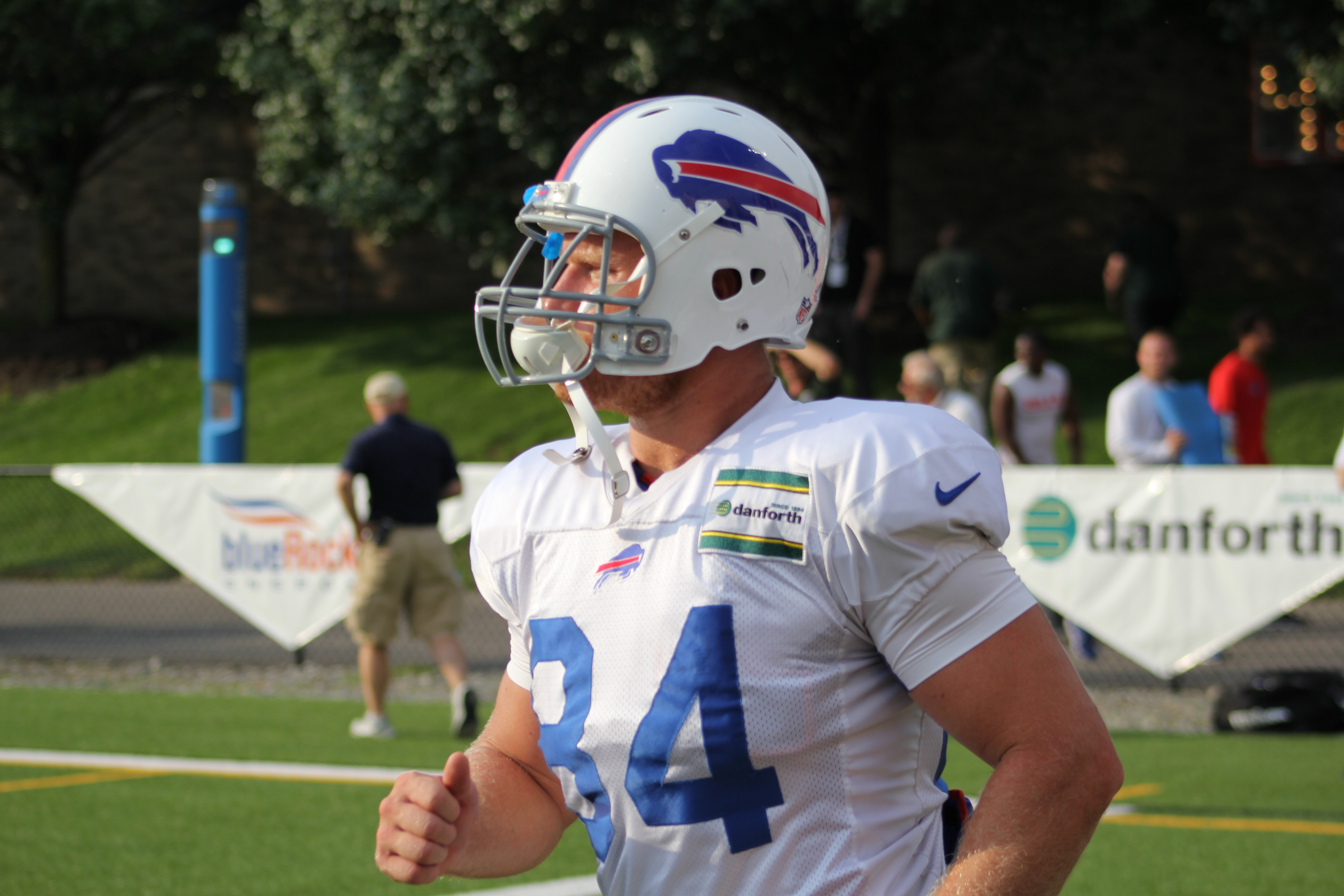
- O'Leary with the Buffalo Bills in 2015

No. 84, 83, 86
- Position: Tight end

Personal information
- Born: August 31, 1992 (age 34); North Palm Beach, Florida, U.S.
- Listed height: 6 ft 3 in (1.91 m)
- Listed weight: 252 lb (114 kg)

Career information
- High school: William T. Dwyer (Palm Beach Gardens, Florida)
- College: Florida State (2011–2014)
- NFL draft: 2015: 6th round, 194th overall pick

Career history

Playing
- Buffalo Bills (2015–2017); Miami Dolphins (2018–2019); Jacksonville Jaguars (2019); Las Vegas Raiders (2020)

Coaching
- Florida State (2023–present) Offensive assistant

Awards and highlights
- BCS national champion (2013); John Mackey Award (2014); Ozzie Newsome Award (2014); Consensus All-American (2014); First-team All-ACC (2014); Second-team All-ACC (2013)

Career NFL statistics
- Receptions: 53
- Receiving yards: 668
- Receiving touchdowns: 4
- Stats at Pro Football Reference

Nicklaus O'Leary (born August 31, 1992) is an American former professional football player who was a tight end in the National Football League (NFL). He played college football for the Florida State Seminoles, earning consensus All-American honors in 2014. He was selected by the Buffalo Bills in the sixth round of the 2015 NFL draft.

== Early life ==
Nicklaus O'Leary is one of five children of Bill and Nan (Nicklaus) O'Leary. He attended Dwyer High School in Palm Beach Gardens, Florida, where he played football and lacrosse. He won state titles in both football and lacrosse. As a senior, he had 51 receptions for 875 yards and 12 touchdowns. Considered a four-star recruit by Rivals.com, he was listed as the top-ranked tight end recruit in his class.

== College career ==
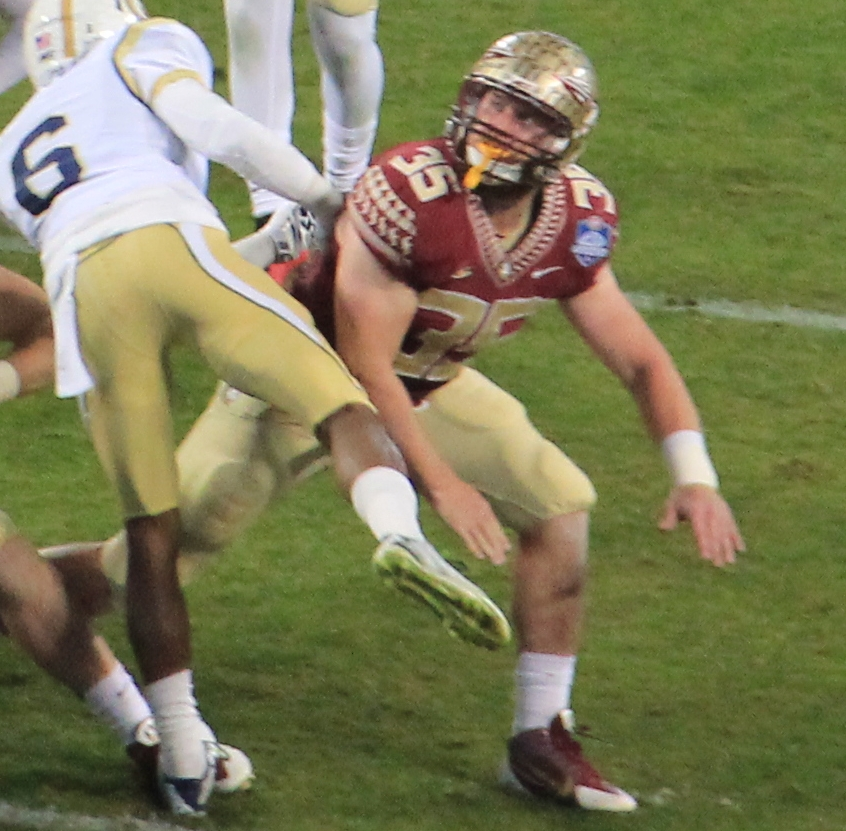
Nick O'Leary at FSU.

As a true freshman in 2011, O'Leary played in all 13 games with two starts. He finished the season with 12 receptions for 164 yards and one touchdown. As a sophomore in 2012, he started 11 of 13 games, recording 21 receptions for 252 yards and three touchdowns. As a junior in 2013, he was a John Mackey Award finalist after recording 33 receptions for 557 yards with seven touchdowns. After considering entering the 2014 NFL draft, O'Leary returned to Florida State for his senior season. During his senior season, he set Florida State's record for career receptions for a tight end. He again was a finalist for the John Mackey Award, this time winning it. He was also named a consensus All-American. O'Leary finished the season with 48 receptions for 618 yards and six touchdowns. For his career, O'Leary had 114 receptions for 1,591 yards and 17 touchdowns.

== Professional career ==
Pre-draft measurables
| Height | Weight | Arm length | Hand span | Wingspan | 40-yard dash | 10-yard split | 20-yard split | 20-yard shuttle | Three-cone drill | Vertical jump | Broad jump | Bench press |
|---|---|---|---|---|---|---|---|---|---|---|---|---|
| 6 ft 3 1/4 in (1.91 m) | 252 lb (114 kg) | 29 3/4 in (0.76 m) | 9 3/8 in (0.24 m) | 6 ft 2 in (1.88 m) | 4.93 s | 1.81 s | 2.94 s | 4.50 s | 7.40 s | 30.5 in (0.77 m) | 9 ft 2 in (2.79 m) | 21 reps |
All values from NFL Combine

=== Buffalo Bills ===
O'Leary was selected by the Buffalo Bills in the sixth round (194th overall) of the 2015 NFL draft.

On September 8, 2015, the Bills cut O'Leary and re-signed him to the practice squad two days later. On December 8, 2015, he was promoted to the active roster after Matthew Mulligan was cut.

On November 12, 2017, in a 47–10 loss to the New Orleans Saints, he caught his first career touchdown, a seven-yard pass from quarterback Nathan Peterman.

On September 1, 2018, O'Leary was released by the Bills.

=== Miami Dolphins ===
On September 20, 2018, O'Leary was signed to the Miami Dolphins' practice squad. He was promoted to the active roster on October 5, 2018. He scored his first touchdown with the Dolphins in Week 6 against the Bears on a five-yard pass from Brock Osweiler. On December 1, 2018, O'Leary signed a one-year contract extension with the Dolphins through the 2019 season.

On October 29, 2019, O’Leary was released by the Dolphins.

=== Jacksonville Jaguars ===
On November 18, 2019, O'Leary was signed by the Jacksonville Jaguars.

=== Las Vegas Raiders ===
On April 6, 2020, O'Leary was signed by the Las Vegas Raiders. He was placed on the reserve/non-football injury list on May 28, 2020. On June 23, 2020, it was revealed that O'Leary underwent a heart procedure because there was a 100% blockage in one artery adjacent with the heart. Some sources surfaced that O'Leary was retiring from football, but O'Leary still intended to play in 2021, regardless of his recent procedure.

== Coaching career ==
In 2023, O'Leary joined Florida State as a student assistant coach, working with the offense.

== Career statistics ==
=== NFL ===
| Year | Team | Games | | Receiving | | | | | | | |
| Year | Team | GP | GS | Tgt | Rec | Yds | Avg | Lng | TD | R/G | Y/G |
|---|---|---|---|---|---|---|---|---|---|---|---|
| 2015 | BUF | 4 | 0 | 3 | 1 | 37 | 37.0 | 37 | 0 | 0.3 | 9.3 |
| 2016 | BUF | 16 | 7 | 14 | 9 | 114 | 12.7 | 28 | 0 | 0.6 | 7.1 |
| 2017 | BUF | 15 | 5 | 32 | 22 | 322 | 14.6 | 32 | 2 | 1.5 | 21.5 |
| 2018 | MIA | 12 | 7 | 10 | 8 | 86 | 10.8 | 19 | 1 | 0.7 | 10.2 |
| 2019 | MIA | 7 | 2 | 5 | 4 | 37 | 9.3 | 19 | 0 | 0.6 | 5.3 |
| 2019 | JAX | 5 | 3 | 13 | 9 | 72 | 8.0 | 15 | 1 | 1.8 | 14.4 |
| Career | | 59 | 24 | 77 | 53 | 668 | 12.6 | 37 | 4 | 0.8 | 11.3 |

=== College ===
| Season | Team | GP | Receiving | | |
| Season | Team | GP | Rec | Yds | TD |
|---|---|---|---|---|---|
| 2011 | Florida State | 13 | 12 | 164 | 1 |
| 2012 | Florida State | 13 | 21 | 252 | 3 |
| 2013 | Florida State | 12 | 33 | 557 | 7 |
| 2014 | Florida State | 13 | 48 | 618 | 6 |
| Total | | 51 | 114 | 1,591 | 17 |

== Personal life ==
O'Leary's maternal grandfather is golfing legend Jack Nicklaus. Nick's father, Bill, was a highly recruited tight end who played at the University of Georgia, and his mother, Nan, played volleyball at Georgia.
