= Ramon Humber =

American football player (born 1987)

No. 59, 54, 53, 50
- Position: Linebacker

Personal information
- Born: August 10, 1987 (age 39); Minneapolis, Minnesota, U.S.
- Listed height: 5 ft 11 in (1.80 m)
- Listed weight: 232 lb (105 kg)

Career information
- High school: Champlin Park (Champlin, Minnesota)
- College: North Dakota State
- NFL draft: 2009: undrafted

Career history
- Indianapolis Colts (2009–2010); New Orleans Saints (2010–2015); New England Patriots (2016)*; Buffalo Bills (2016–2018); New England Patriots (2018)
- * Offseason or practice squad member only

Awards and highlights
- Super Bowl champion (LIII)

Career NFL statistics
- Total tackles: 312
- Sacks: 4.5
- Forced fumbles: 2
- Stats at Pro Football Reference

Ramon Humber (born August 10, 1987) is an American former professional football player who was a linebacker in the National Football League (NFL). He attended Champlin Park High School in Brooklyn Park, Minnesota, then played college football for the North Dakota State Bison. He was signed by the Indianapolis Colts as an undrafted free agent in 2009.

== Professional career ==
Pre-draft measurables
Height	Weight
5 ft 10 3/4 in (1.80 m)	224 lb (102 kg)
Values from Pro Day

=== Indianapolis Colts ===
Humber led the Colts with 17 special teams tackles during 2009 and was active on special teams in that season's playoffs and Super Bowl. In 2010, he was placed on injured reserve after two games with a broken hand and was waived from injured reserve on November 9, 2010.

=== New Orleans Saints ===
The New Orleans Saints signed him on December 1. He played in 13 games in 2011. In 2012, he was suspended for the first three games of the season for a violation of the NFL substance abuse policy, then restored to the active roster. In the 2015 season, he finished with one sack, 47 total tackles, and one pass defended in 14 games. On February 8, 2016, Humber was released by the Saints.

=== New England Patriots (first stint) ===
The New England Patriots signed Humber to a one-year contract on March 9, 2016. On August 30, 2016, Humber was released by the Patriots.

=== Buffalo Bills ===
On August 31, 2016, Humber was signed by the Buffalo Bills. He played in all 16 games, including one start. Most of his contributions during the 2016 season occurred on special teams, as he tied for the team lead with 12 special teams tackles.

On February 16, 2017, Humber re-signed with the Bills. On September 10, in the season opener against the New York Jets, he recorded a career-high 12 tackles in the 21–12 victory. Humber played in 13 games with nine starts, recording a career-high 89 tackles, which finished third on the team.

On March 20, 2018, Humber re-signed with the Bills on a one-year contract. He played in nine games before being released on November 10.

=== New England Patriots (second stint) ===
On November 14, 2018, Humber signed with the Patriots to a one-year deal. Humber appeared in 6 games for the Patriots. Humber finished the 2018 season with nine tackles. Humber helped the Patriots reach Super Bowl LIII where they beat the Los Angeles Rams 13–3.

== NFL career statistics ==
Legend
**Bold**	Career high

=== Regular season ===
Year	Team	Games		Tackles					Interceptions					Fumbles			
Year	Team	GP	GS	Cmb	Solo	Ast	Sck	TFL	Int	Yds	TD	Lng	PD	FF	FR	Yds	TD
2009	IND	**16**	2	33	28	5	0.0	1	0	0	0	0	0	**1**	0	0	0
2010	IND	2	0	2	1	1	0.0	0	0	0	0	0	0	0	0	0	0
2010	NOR	3	0	2	2	0	0.0	0	0	0	0	0	0	0	0	0	0
2011	NOR	13	3	22	16	6	**1.0**	2	0	0	0	0	**1**	0	0	0	0
2012	NOR	13	0	12	10	2	0.0	0	0	0	0	0	0	0	0	0	0
2013	NOR	**16**	3	29	18	11	0.5	2	0	0	0	0	**1**	0	0	0	0
2014	NOR	15	6	50	38	12	**1.0**	2	0	0	0	0	**1**	0	0	0	0
2015	NOR	14	4	47	29	18	**1.0**	2	0	0	0	0	**1**	0	0	0	0
2016	BUF	**16**	1	17	15	2	0.0	0	0	0	0	0	0	0	0	0	0
2017	BUF	13	**9**	**89**	**60**	**29**	**1.0**	**8**	0	0	0	0	**1**	**1**	0	0	0
2018	BUF	9	0	9	9	0	0.0	0	0	0	0	0	0	0	0	0	0
2018	NWE	6	0	0	0	0	0.0	0	0	0	0	0	0	0	0	0	0
Career		136	28	312	226	86	4.5	17	0	0	0	0	5	2	0	0	0

=== Playoffs ===
Year	Team	Games		Tackles					Interceptions					Fumbles			
Year	Team	GP	GS	Cmb	Solo	Ast	Sck	TFL	Int	Yds	TD	Lng	PD	FF	FR	Yds	TD
2009	IND	**3**	0	2	2	0	0.0	0	0	0	0	0	0	0	0	0	0
2010	NOR	1	0	2	2	0	0.0	0	0	0	0	0	0	0	0	0	0
2011	NOR	2	0	1	1	0	0.0	0	0	0	0	0	0	0	0	0	0
2013	NOR	2	**1**	5	**3**	2	0.0	0	0	0	0	0	0	0	0	0	0
2017	BUF	1	**1**	**6**	**3**	**3**	0.0	**1**	0	0	0	0	0	0	0	0	0
2018	NWE	**3**	0	3	2	1	0.0	0	0	0	0	0	0	0	0	0	0
Career		12	2	19	13	6	0.0	1	0	0	0	0	0	0	0	0	0
