= Paul Lancaster =

American artist

Paul E. Lancaster
- Born: August 31, 1930; Lobelville, Tennessee
- Died: June 18, 2019 (aged 88); Nashville, Tennessee
- Resting place: Mount Olivet Cemetery
- Style: Folk art

Paul E. Lancaster (August 31, 1930 – June 18, 2019) was an American painter and framer known for his self-taught folk art.

== Early life ==
Lancaster was born in Lobelville, Tennessee. He claimed Cherokee ancestry through a grandfather. At one point he made a living working at various grocery stores and markets. He later joined the United States Army where he claimed he was offered a position as a medical illustrator, but he declined this role as he felt it would be a waste of his artistic talent.

== Painting ==
Lancaster received no formal art education and was self-taught. Accounts vary on when Lancaster first took up painting and illustration, including while hospitalized for tuberculosis in 1953, as a child in the 1930s and 1940s, or while in the Army in 1959. His art is in the permanent collection of a number of museums and galleries, including the Smithsonian Institution and the galleries of the University of Virginia. Additionally, Lancaster's art was the focus and subject of exhibitions at the Reece Museum and the Parthenon.

He was a framer at the Lyzon Gallery in Nashville for nearly 30 years. The gallery's owner, Myron King, did not promote Lancaster's more complicated and unique paintings, instead he encouraged the artist to make simple etchings that could be sold to locals. Following Lancaster's retirement from the Lyzon Gallery in 1995, Lancaster continued to paint as an independent artist. According to a profile in British art magazine Raw Vision, his style was said to incorporate floral, human figure, and fantasy elements. Many of the landscapes and settings of his paintings were inspired middle and west Tennessee, where he was raised.

Lancaster died in 2019.
