= Marc Lubick =

American football player and coach (born 1977)

Buffalo Bills
- Title: Game management/Assistant wide receivers coach

Personal information
- Born: November 13, 1977 (age 49); Bozeman, Montana, U.S.

Career information
- Position: Defensive back
- High school: Fort Collins (CO)
- College: Montana State

Career history

Coaching
- Colorado State (2002) Academic graduate assistant; Colorado State (2005–2009); Wide receivers coach (2005–2007); Tight ends coach & recruiting coordinator (2008–2009); Houston Texans (2010–2013); Offensive assistant coach (2010–2011); Assistant wide receivers coach (2012–2013); Vanderbilt (2014) Wide receivers coach; Denver Broncos (2015–2016) Assistant wide receivers coach; Buffalo Bills (2017–present); Offensive quality control & assistant quarterbacks coach (2017); Offensive assistant & defensive special projects (2018–2019); Game management & assistant wide receivers coach (2020–present)

Operations
- St. Louis Rams (2003–2004) Scouting assistant

Awards and highlights
- Super Bowl champion (50)

Marc Lubick (born November 13, 1977) is an American football coach who is the assistant wide receivers coach for the Buffalo Bills of the National Football League (NFL).

== College playing career ==
Lubick played collegiately as a defensive back at Montana State University from 1997 to 1999.

== Coaching career ==
Lubick launched his coaching career in 2000 as a defensive student assistant at Colorado State University. After the 2002 campaign, Lubick joined the St. Louis Rams for two years as a scout. He returned to CSU and served as their wide receivers coach from 2005 to 2007 and their tight ends coach and recruiting coordinator from 2008 to 2009. Lubick would follower this by serving four years with the Houston Texans, including two seasons as an assistant wide receivers coach. He would become the wide receivers coach at Vanderbilt in 2014 following those four years only to return to the NFL the next year with the Denver Broncos as an assistant wide receivers coach. On February 7, 2016, Lubick was part of the Broncos coaching staff that won Super Bowl 50. In the game, the Broncos defeated the Carolina Panthers by a score of 24–10. After this Super Bowl win he went to the Buffalo Bills in a number of different offensive roles and is still currently there. Following the 2025 season, Lubick was retained by new head coach Joe Brady to continue to serve as the team's passing game specialist.

== Personal life ==
Marc is the son of former Colorado State Rams football coach Sonny Lubick and brother of University of Kansas co-offensive coordinator Matt Lubick.

Marc is married and lives with his wife Stephanie.
