= Cedric O'Neal =

American football player (born 1994)

No. 22 – Jousters
- Position: Running back
- Roster status: Active

Personal information
- Born: January 29, 1994 (age 32); Dublin, Georgia, U.S.
- Listed height: 5 ft 10 in (1.78 m)
- Listed weight: 215 lb (98 kg)

Career information
- High school: Dublin
- College: Valdosta State
- NFL draft: 2016: undrafted

Career history
- Philadelphia Eagles (2016)*; Buffalo Bills (2016)*; Jousters (2020)
- * Offseason or practice squad member only

Awards and highlights
- NCAA Division II national champion (2012)
- Stats at Pro Football Reference

Cedric O'Neal (born January 29, 1994) is an American football running back. He was signed by the Philadelphia Eagles after going undrafted in the 2016 NFL draft. He played college football at Valdosta State.

== Professional career ==
=== Philadelphia Eagles ===
O'Neal was signed on May 5, 2016, by the Philadelphia Eagles as an undrafted free agent. He was waived on August 21, 2016, but was re-signed on August 29, only to be waived on September 3, 2016.

=== Buffalo Bills ===
O'Neal was signed by the Buffalo Bills on December 15, 2016. He signed a reserve/future contract with the Bills on January 2, 2017. On August 29, 2017, he was released by the Bills.

=== The Spring League ===
O'Neal was selected by the Jousters of The Spring League during its player selection draft on October 10, 2020.
