= Nathan Peterman =

American football player (born 1994)

No. 2, 3, 14
- Position: Quarterback

Personal information
- Born: May 4, 1994 (age 32); Jacksonville, Florida, U.S.
- Listed height: 6 ft 2 in (1.88 m)
- Listed weight: 220 lb (100 kg)

Career information
- High school: Bartram Trail (St. Johns, Florida)
- College: Tennessee (2012–2014); Pittsburgh (2015–2016)
- NFL draft: 2017: 5th round, 171st overall pick

Career history
- Buffalo Bills (2017–2018); Oakland / Las Vegas Raiders (2018–2021); Chicago Bears (2022–2023); New Orleans Saints (2024)*; Las Vegas Raiders (2024)*; Atlanta Falcons (2024)*
- * Offseason or practice squad member only

Career NFL statistics
- Passing attempts: 160
- Passing completions: 85
- Completion percentage: 53.1%
- TD–INT: 4–13
- Passing yards: 712
- Passer rating: 39.4
- Stats at Pro Football Reference

Nathan Michael Peterman (born May 4, 1994) is an American former professional football player who was a quarterback in the National Football League (NFL) for eight seasons. He played college football for the Pittsburgh Panthers following a stint with the Tennessee Volunteers. Peterman was selected by the Buffalo Bills in the fifth round of the 2017 NFL draft.

Peterman struggled in the NFL, throwing five interceptions during the first half of his starting debut and posting a 0.0 passer rating in the 2018 season opener. His 11 interceptions between 2017 and 2018 are the most for a quarterback with less than 100 passing attempts. Released by the Bills during the 2018 season, Peterman spent his last six seasons as a member of the Oakland / Las Vegas Raiders, Chicago Bears, New Orleans Saints, and Atlanta Falcons. After retiring as a player, Peterman became a sports agent.

== Early life ==
Peterman attended Bartram Trail High School in St. Johns, Florida. While at Bartram Trail, he played for the Bears football team. As a senior, Peterman threw for 2,392 yards and 36 touchdowns. He was rated as a four-star recruit and committed to the University of Tennessee to play college football under head coach Derek Dooley.

== College career ==
=== Tennessee ===
In 2012, Peterman redshirted in first year at Tennessee. After a poor performance against Vanderbilt, Dooley was fired as head coach.

After his redshirt freshman year, Peterman's head coach was Butch Jones. Peterman was one of the three backup quarterbacks as Justin Worley won the starting job in the offseason. Peterman made his collegiate debut in a home game at Neyland Stadium against Austin Peay in relief of Worley in a 45–0 victory. He was 4-of-8 passing for 28 yards against the Governors. After the game against #2 Oregon at Autzen Stadium, where Tennessee was defeated by a score of 59–14, Worley was benched in favor of Peterman. Peterman made his first career start against #19 Florida at Ben Hill Griffin Stadium in Gainesville, Florida. However, Peterman was injured in the game and was eventually benched for Worley during the game after completing 4-of-11 passes for only five yards and two interceptions. The injury ended up being a broken hand. Overall, Peterman appeared in four games that season, completing 10-of-23 passes for 45 yards and two interceptions.

As a sophomore in 2014, Peterman remained behind Worley on the depth chart. He played in seven games and made one start, which came against #4 Alabama at Neyland Stadium, after Worley was injured in the 34–3 loss to #3 Ole Miss. Despite getting the start, Joshua Dobbs relieved Peterman in the game. Dobbs started the next game against South Carolina and kept the job for the rest of the season. Peterman made one last appearance as a member of the Volunteers against Kentucky. In relief of Dobbs in the 50–16 victory, Peterman finished the game. He completed 10 of 20 passes for 49 yards on the 2014 season.

=== Pittsburgh ===
Peterman transferred as a graduate transfer to the University of Pittsburgh in 2015. Under new head coach Pat Narduzzi, Peterman entered the season as the backup to Chad Voytik, but replaced him as the starter after two games. In his first start, Peterman completed 20 of 29 passes for 219 yards, two touchdowns, and two interceptions in a 27–24 loss to Iowa. He kept the starting job for the rest of the year, completing 193-of-314 passes for 2,287 yards, 20 touchdowns, and eight interceptions as the Panthers finished with an 8–5 record.

Peterman returned as a starter his senior year in Pittsburgh. Peterman had a career day against the eventual National Champion Clemson Tigers on November 12. He threw for 308 yards and five touchdowns in the narrow 43–42 victory. Pittsburgh's victory was Clemson's only loss of the season. Peterman threw for 2,855 yards, 27 touchdowns, and seven interceptions as the Panthers once again finished with an 8–5 record.

== Professional career ==
=== Pre-draft ===
On November 16, 2016, it was announced that Peterman accepted an invitation to play in the 2017 Senior Bowl. During Senior Bowl practices, Peterman impressed scouts and media in attendance after displaying his decent size, accuracy, mobility, and powerful arm. Peterman met with representatives from the New Orleans Saints during the week and was praised by NFL analysts Daniel Jeremiah and Charles Davis. On January 28, 2017, Peterman played in the Senior Bowl and completed 16 of 23 passes for 153 yards and a touchdown during the North's 16–15 loss to the South. Peterman played for Chicago Bears head coach John Fox's North team during the game. Peterman was one of 15 collegiate quarterbacks who received an invitation to participate at the NFL Scouting Combine in Indianapolis, Indiana. He completed most of the combine drills, but opted to skip the bench press. Peterman finished fifth among quarterbacks in the three-cone drill, seventh in the 40-yard dash and tied for sixth in the vertical jump and short shuttle.

Pre-draft measurables
Height	Weight	Arm length	Hand span	40-yard dash	10-yard split	20-yard split	20-yard shuttle	Three-cone drill	Vertical jump	Broad jump	Wonderlic
6 ft 2 1/2 in (1.89 m)	226 lb (103 kg)	32 in (0.81 m)	9 7/8 in (0.25 m)	4.82 s	1.67 s	2.80 s	4.31 s	7.14 s	31 in (0.79 m)	9 ft 2 in (2.79 m)	33
All values from NFL Combine

=== Buffalo Bills ===
==== 2017 season ====
The Buffalo Bills selected Peterman in the fifth round (171st overall) of the 2017 NFL draft. He was the eighth quarterback selected.

Peterman was brought in to compete for the Bills' backup quarterback position along with T. J. Yates and Cardale Jones. Peterman performed well enough to win the backup quarterback job after Jones was traded to the Los Angeles Chargers. Following the third preseason game against the Baltimore Ravens, Peterman became the only healthy quarterback for the Bills as starter Tyrod Taylor and Yates both sustained concussions in the game. This left open the possibility of Peterman starting for the team in Week 1, but Taylor recovered in time to start the season opener against the New York Jets. Had Peterman started the game, he would have been the second-lowest drafted rookie quarterback to start a season opener since the AFL–NFL merger.

During Week 10 against the Saints, Peterman made his NFL debut with less than five minutes left in the game. With the Bills trailing 47–3, he led a scoring drive, completing seven of 10 passes for 79 yards and a touchdown in the 47–10 loss. Peterman threw his first career touchdown on a seven-yard pass to tight end Nick O'Leary. Peterman was named the starter for the next game against the Los Angeles Chargers due to Taylor's struggles. During the 54–24 road loss, Peterman threw for 66 yards and five interceptions in the first half and was relieved by Taylor at halftime. His five interceptions tied an NFL record for the most thrown in a player's first career start. Two weeks later against the New England Patriots, Taylor suffered a knee injury during the fourth quarter and was relieved by Peterman, who had 50 passing yards and a nine-yard carry in the 23–3 loss. Due to Taylor's injury, Peterman was named the starter the Week 14 matchup against the Indianapolis Colts. During the game, which was played in a snowstorm, he completed five of 10 passes for 57 yards and a touchdown before leaving the eventual 13–7 overtime victory in the third quarter with a concussion.

Peterman finished his rookie year with 252 passing yards, two touchdowns, and five interceptions in four games and two starts. The Bills finished second in the AFC East and qualified for the playoffs as the #6-seed. During the Wild Card Round against the Jacksonville Jaguars, Peterman entered the game with less than two minutes remaining in the fourth quarter after Taylor suffered a concussion. He managed to convert two first downs for the Buffalo offense, including a four-yard scramble to move the chains on fourth down, before throwing a critical interception to Jaguars cornerback Jalen Ramsey, thus sealing the 10–3 victory for Jacksonville and ending the Bills' season.

==== 2018 season ====
During the offseason, the Bills traded Taylor to the Cleveland Browns. Peterman competed with rookie first-round draft pick Josh Allen and free-agent signing A. J. McCarron for the starting quarterback position. After trading McCarron to the Oakland Raiders, the Bills named Peterman their opening day starter over Allen.

Starting in the season opener against the Ravens, Peterman completed five of 18 passes for 24 yards and two interceptions. He did not lead the Bills to a first down until the third quarter and was benched in favor of Josh Allen after posting a 0.0 passer rating during the 47–3 road loss. On September 12, 2018, the Bills named Allen the starter for the Week 2 matchup against the Chargers, relegating Peterman to the bench. Four weeks later, the Bills signed Derek Anderson to serve as Allen's backup.

During Week 6 against the Houston Texans, after Allen suffered an elbow injury in the third quarter and with Anderson inactive, Peterman entered the game and threw a touchdown to Zay Jones to put Buffalo in the lead in the fourth quarter. However, after the Texans later tied the game at 13, Peterman threw two interceptions that cost the Bills the game, including a pick-six to cornerback Johnathan Joseph that proved to be Houston's winning score. Peterman finished the 20–13 road loss with 61 passing yards. On October 17, 2018, Bills head coach Sean McDermott confirmed that Anderson would start in the next game against the Colts with Allen ruled out. The following week against the Patriots on Monday Night Football, Anderson suffered a concussion late in the fourth quarter and was relieved by Peterman, who completed both of his passing attempts for 23 yards in the 25–6 loss. Due to Anderson's injury, Peterman was named the starter for the Week 9 matchup against the Bears. In what would become Peterman's final start as a Bill, he rushed for a touchdown, snapping the team's streak of 11 straight quarters and 39 straight possessions without a touchdown, and had a career-high 188 passing yards, but also threw three interceptions, including a pick six, during the 41–9 loss. By then, Peterman had become the butt of jokes among NFL fans for his play, which USA Today called "historically bad".

Peterman was benched in favor of another midseason signing, Matt Barkley, for the Week 10 matchup against the New York Jets. Barkley led the Bills to a 41–10 road victory over the Jets. With the Bills entering their bye week and Allen expected to be ready to play by the time of their next game, the Bills released Peterman on November 12. He finished his tenure in Buffalo with 548 passing yards, four total touchdowns (three passing, one rushing), and 12 interceptions for a passer rating of 32.5.

=== Oakland / Las Vegas Raiders (first stint) ===
After workouts with the Detroit Lions and Denver Broncos, Peterman was signed by the Oakland Raiders as part of their practice squad on December 19, 2018, as head coach Jon Gruden had previously raved about Peterman's play in college. Peterman signed a reserve/future contract with the Raiders on January 1, 2019.

Peterman had a strong preseason, but was placed on injured reserve with an elbow injury on September 2, 2019.

On April 16, 2020, the Raiders re-signed Peterman, a restricted free agent, to an original-round tender. He was fined US$15,000 by the NFL on October 5 for attending a maskless charity event hosted by teammate Darren Waller during the COVID-19 pandemic in violation of the NFL's COVID-19 protocols for the 2020 season. Peterman made his Raiders debut in Week 12 against the Atlanta Falcons in relief of starter Derek Carr. Peterman completed three of five passes for 25 yards and rushed once for nine yards in the 43–6 blowout road loss.

On February 4, 2021, Peterman signed a one-year contract extension with the Raiders. During a Week 5 20–9 loss to the Bears, he briefly relieved Derek Carr in the fourth quarter after Carr suffered an injury. On November 2, Peterman was released and was re-signed to the practice squad. His contract expired when the team's season ended on January 15, 2022.

=== Chicago Bears ===
==== 2022 season ====
On May 11, 2022, Peterman signed with the Bears. He was released on August 30, but was signed to the practice squad the next day. The Bears flexed Peterman to the active roster on November 26, after an injury to starter Justin Fields.

During pregame warmups in Week 12, primary backup Trevor Siemian, who was slated to start that week, suffered an oblique injury which led many people to believe that the Bears were going to start Peterman against the New York Jets, but Siemian ultimately ended up starting the game.

On December 3, 2022, Peterman was signed to the active roster after Siemian was placed on injured reserve, becoming Fields' primary backup. During a Week 15 25–20 loss to the Philadelphia Eagles, Peterman made his Bears debut and had an incomplete pass. In the next game against his former team, the Buffalo Bills, Peterman made a relief appearance in place of Fields during the waning moments of the 35–13 loss, completing three of five passes for 25 yards before spiking the ball at the 50-yard line and attempting a Hail Mary pass that was intercepted by Bills safety Jaquan Johnson on the final play.

On January 4, 2023, Peterman was named the starter for the regular season finale against the Minnesota Vikings, replacing Justin Fields, who was ruled out with a sore hip. Peterman completed 11-of-19 passes for 114 yards and a touchdown in the 29–13 loss.

==== 2023 season ====
Peterman was re-signed to a one-year deal on March 31, 2023. He was released as part of final roster moves on August 29, but was re-signed to the active roster two days later. Peterman was named the second-string option behind starter Justin Fields and ahead of undrafted rookie Tyson Bagent, beating out veteran P. J. Walker for the role. On September 20, Peterman was cut for a second time, but was re-signed the next day. However, he was demoted to third string before Week 4 in favor of an increasingly impressive Bagent. On October 5, Peterman was cut for a third time, but was re-signed to the practice squad four days later.

=== New Orleans Saints ===
On March 18, 2024, Peterman signed with the New Orleans Saints. His contract was terminated on August 2.

=== Las Vegas Raiders (second stint) ===
On August 13, 2024, Peterman re-signed with the Las Vegas Raiders. He was released as one of the early cuts of the 53-man roster on August 27.

=== Atlanta Falcons ===
On September 3, 2024, the Atlanta Falcons signed Peterman to their practice squad. He became a free agent after the season.

=== Retirement ===
On June 3, 2026, Peterman announced his retirement from professional football after the Broncos decided not to sign him following a tryout.

== Career statistics ==
Legend
**Bold**	Career high

=== NFL ===
==== Regular season ====
Year	Team	Games			Passing									Rushing					Sacks		Fumbles	
Year	Team	GP	GS	Record	Cmp	Att	Pct	Yds	Y/A	Lng	TD	Int	Rtg	Att	Yds	Avg	Lng	TD	Sck	SckY	Fum	Lost
2017	BUF	4	2	**1–1**	24	49	49.0	252	5.1	21	**2**	5	38.4	7	23	3.3	9	0	1	5	**2**	0
2018	BUF	4	2	0–2	**44**	**81**	54.3	**296**	3.7	26	1	**7**	30.7	**10**	**50**	5.0	**24**	**1**	**7**	**34**	0	0
2018	OAK	0	0	—	DNP																	
2019	OAK	0	0	—	Did not play due to injury																	
2020	LV	1	0	—	3	5	**60.0**	25	5.0	12	0	0	**72.9**	1	9	**9.0**	9	0	2	16	0	0
2021	LV	1	0	—	0	0	0.0	0	0.0	0	0	0	0.0	2	2	1.0	1	0	0	0	0	0
2022	CHI	3	1	0–1	14	25	56.0	139	**5.6**	**28**	1	1	68.6	2	7	3.5	6	0	1	6	0	0
2023	CHI	2	0	—	0	0	0.0	0	0.0	0	0	0	0.0	2	−4	−2.0	−2	0	1	5	1	0
Career		15	5	1–4	85	160	53.1	712	4.5	28	4	13	39.4	24	87	3.6	24	1	12	66	3	0

==== Postseason ====
Year	Team	Games			Passing									Rushing					Sacks		Fumbles	
Year	Team	GP	GS	Record	Cmp	Att	Pct	Yds	Y/A	Lng	TD	Int	Rtg	Att	Yds	Avg	Lng	TD	Sck	SckY	Fum	Lost
2017	BUF	1	0	—	1	3	33.3	14	4.7	14	0	1	9.7	1	4	4.0	4	0	0	0	1	0
2021	LV	0	0	—	DNP																	
Career		1	0	—	1	3	33.3	14	4.7	14	0	1	9.7	1	4	4.0	4	0	0	0	1	0

=== College ===
Year	Team	Games			Passing						
Year	Team	GP	GS	Record	Cmp	Att	Pct	Yds	TD	Int	RTg
2012	Tennessee	0	0	–	Redshirt						
2013	Tennessee	3	1	0–1	10	23	43.5	45	0	2	42.5
2014	Tennessee	6	1	0–1	10	20	50	49	0	0	70.6
2015	Pittsburgh	13	11	6–4	**193**	**313**	**61.7**	2,287	20	**8**	139.0
2016	Pittsburgh	13	13	**8–5**	185	306	60.5	**2,855**	**27**	7	**163.4**
Career		35	26	14–11	398	662	60.1	5,236	47	17	144.9

== Post-playing career ==
In 2026, Peterman underwent training to become an agent for Range Sports, his agency when he was a player, with a focus on student athlete compensation.

== Personal life ==
The younger son of a pastor, Peterman credits his Christian faith in helping him face adversity. Peterman is married to Morgan Peterman (née Shull), his college girlfriend from Tennessee.
