= Adrian McDonald =

- Full name: Adrian William McDonald
- Born: 25 May 1962 (age 64) Mildura, Victoria, Australia
- School: St Patrick's College, Goulburn

Rugby union career
- Position: Scrum-half
International career
Years	Team	Apps	(Points)
1983, 1991	Australia		

Adrian William McDonald (born 25 May 1962) is an Australian former rugby union player.

Born in Mildura, Victoria, McDonald was a scrum-half and had two years in the 1st XV at St Patrick's College, Goulburn, from where he won ACT Schools selection. He subsequently moved to Sydney and played first grade for Parramatta.

McDonald earned Australian under 21s representative honours in 1982 and 1983.

After being a reserve to Dominic Vaughan in New South Wales' loss to Argentina in 1983, McDonald took his place in the Wallabies squad for the 2nd Test against the Pumas, with Vaughan having suffered concussion in the previous international. He didn't get to gain a cap as he spent the match on the bench, backing up Tony Parker.

McDonald played at Eastwood for six seasons, before crossing to Randwick in 1990. He made Australia's expanded 35-man squad for the 1991 Rugby World Cup, losing out to Nick Farr-Jones and Peter Slattery when the final side was named. Both players suffered injuries in the quarter-final win over Ireland and McDonald was flown to Dublin as cover. He ultimately wasn't required for their remaining fixtures as the Wallabies went on to win the tournament, meaning he would return home holding a winner's medal without being capped.

A four-time premiership winner at Randwick, McDonald captained West Harbour for a season in 1995, then finished his career in Western Australia, captaining the state against the touring 1996 Wales team. He won three grand finals with Perth club Associates.
