= Jeremy Butler (American football) =

American football player (born 1991)

No. 17, 10, 88
- Position: Wide receiver

Personal information
- Born: April 22, 1991 (age 35); Bradenton, Florida, U.S.
- Listed height: 6 ft 2 in (1.88 m)
- Listed weight: 213 lb (97 kg)

Career information
- High school: Booker (Sarasota, Florida)
- College: UT Martin
- NFL draft: 2014: undrafted

Career history
- Baltimore Ravens (2014−2015); Tampa Bay Buccaneers (2016); New York Jets (2016); San Diego Chargers (2016); Buffalo Bills (2017)

Career NFL statistics
- Receptions: 33
- Receiving yards: 374
- Stats at Pro Football Reference

Jeremy Butler (born April 22, 1991) is an American former professional football player who was a wide receiver in the National Football League (NFL). He was signed by the Baltimore Ravens as an undrafted free agent in 2014 and played for them in 2015 and 2016. He played college football for the UT Martin Skyhawks.

== College career ==
Butler played at the University of Tennessee at Martin as a wide receiver and earned third-team All-American honors after his improved senior year.

== Professional career ==
=== Baltimore Ravens ===
After going undrafted in the 2014 NFL draft Butler was signed as a free agent to the Baltimore Ravens on May 12, 2014. Butler was placed on the injured reserve list after suffering a shoulder sprain for his rookie season on September 1, 2014.

After returning from injury in his second year, he was expected to compete for a roster spot on the team, however he was released on September 5, 2015 as part of the final roster cuts. He was later re-signed to the practice squad. The Ravens activated Butler from the practice squad on October 26, 2015 as a result of many injuries and he became a frequent contributor to the offense.

On September 3, 2016, Butler was released by the Ravens.

=== Tampa Bay Buccaneers ===
On September 4, 2016, Butler was signed to the Buccaneers practice squad. He was promoted to the active roster on October 4, 2016. He was released on October 9, 2016.

=== New York Jets ===
On October 11, 2016, Butler signed with the New York Jets. He was released on October 29, 2016.

=== San Diego Chargers ===
Butler was claimed off waivers by the Chargers on October 31, 2016.

=== Buffalo Bills ===
On March 13, 2017, Butler signed a one-year contract with the Buffalo Bills. He was waived/injured on September 2, 2017 and placed on injured reserve.
