= Isaiah McKenzie =

American football player (born 1995)

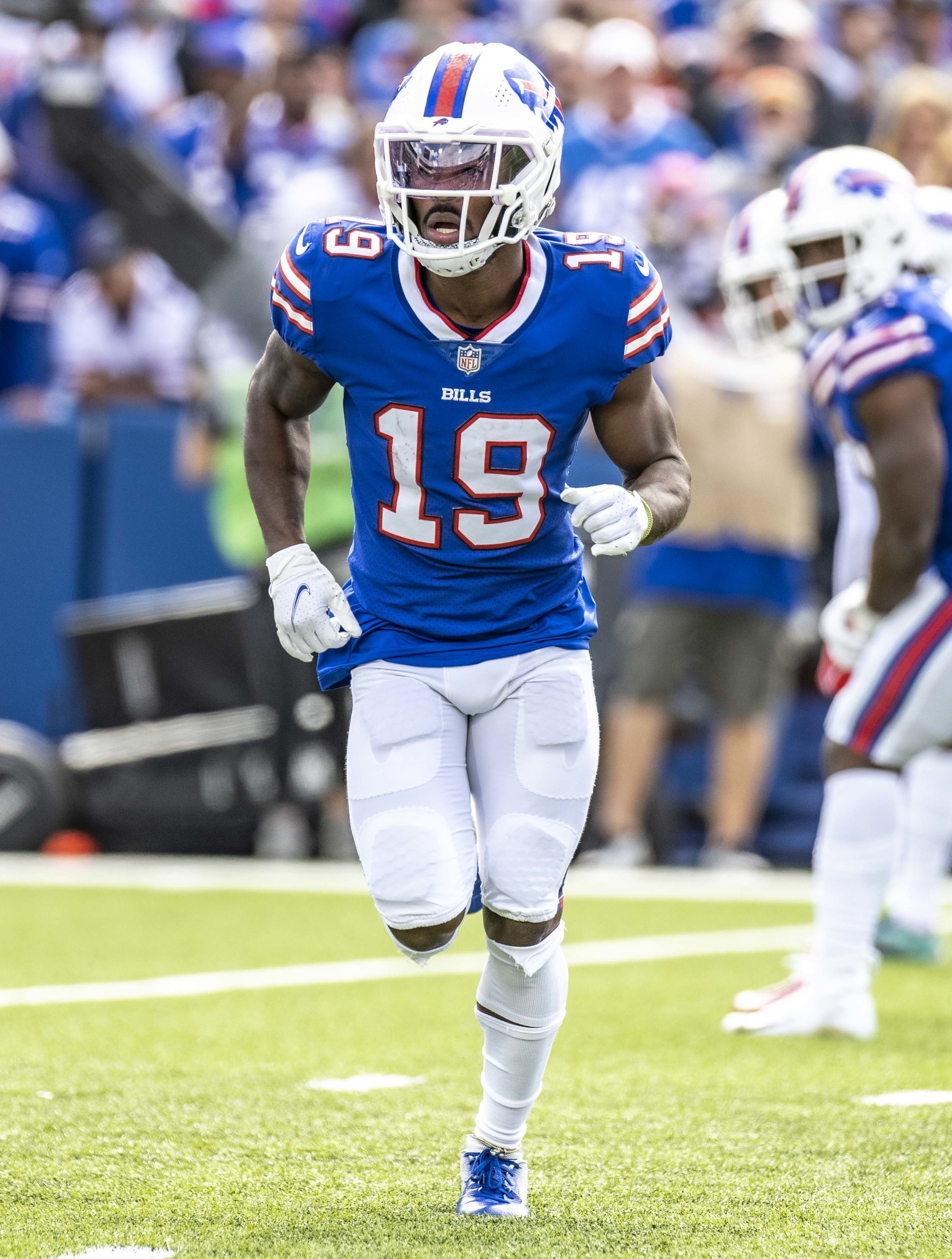
- McKenzie with the Buffalo Bills in 2021

Profile
- Positions: Wide receiver, return specialist

Personal information
- Born: April 9, 1995 (age 31); Miami, Florida, U.S.
- Listed height: 5 ft 8 in (1.73 m)
- Listed weight: 173 lb (78 kg)

Career information
- High school: American Heritage School (Plantation, Florida)
- College: Georgia (2014–2016)
- NFL draft: 2017: 5th round, 172nd overall pick

Career history
- Denver Broncos (2017–2018); Buffalo Bills (2018–2022); Indianapolis Colts (2023); New York Giants (2024)*; Miami Dolphins (2024)*
- * Offseason or practice squad member only

Awards and highlights
- Second-team All-SEC (2016)

Career NFL statistics
- Receptions: 152
- Receiving yards: 1,427
- Rushing yards: 244
- Return yards: 1,986
- Total Touchdowns: 16
- Stats at Pro Football Reference

Isaiah McKenzie (born April 9, 1995) is an American professional football wide receiver and return specialist. He played college football for the Georgia Bulldogs, and was selected by the Denver Broncos in the fifth round of the 2017 NFL draft.

McKenzie plays primarily at wide receiver and punt returner but has also seen playing time at the NFL level as a running back and cornerback.

== College career ==
McKenzie's first two years with the Georgia Bulldogs saw him accumulate 190 receiving yards and 195 rushing yards, as he was primarily used as a kick returner. After Kirby Smart replaced Mark Richt as head coach, McKenzie was more prominently featured in the Georgia passing game. He caught 44 receptions for 633 yards and 7 touchdowns as a junior, becoming the Bulldogs' top receiver. Leading into the 2017 NFL draft, draft analyst Mel Kiper Jr. compared McKenzie to Antonio Brown due to similarities in their kick-return abilities and athleticism.

== Professional career ==
Pre-draft measurables
Height	Weight	Arm length	Hand span	Wingspan	40-yard dash	10-yard split	20-yard split	20-yard shuttle	Three-cone drill	Vertical jump	Broad jump	Bench press
5 ft 7 1/2 in (1.71 m)	173 lb (78 kg)	28 7/8 in (0.73 m)	8 7/8 in (0.23 m)	5 ft 9 1/2 in (1.77 m)	4.42 s	1.52 s	2.57 s	4.15 s	6.64 s	36.0 in (0.91 m)	10 ft 3 in (3.12 m)	11 reps
All values from NFL Combine

=== Denver Broncos ===
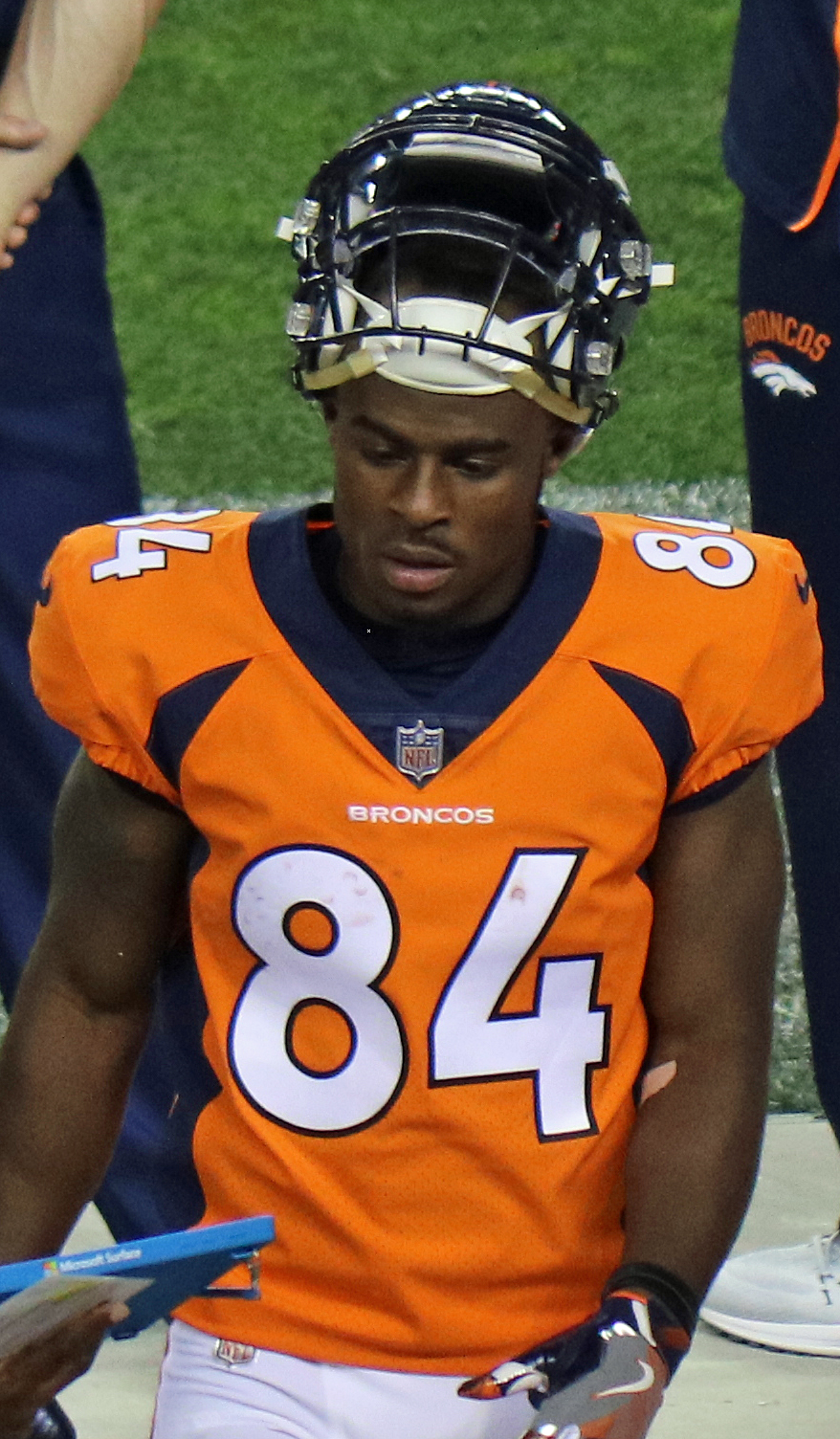
McKenzie with Denver in 2017

McKenzie was selected by the Denver Broncos in the fifth round, 172nd overall, in the 2017 NFL draft.

On September 11, 2017, in the season opener against the Los Angeles Chargers on Monday Night Football, McKenzie returned three punt returns for 48 net yards in his NFL debut. On September 24, against the Buffalo Bills, McKenzie recorded his first career rushing attempt, a four-yard carry. He totaled four receptions for 29 yards on the season.

On September 10, 2018, McKenzie was waived by the Broncos and was re-signed to the practice squad. He was promoted to the active roster on October 25, 2018. He was waived again on November 2, 2018.

=== Buffalo Bills ===
On November 5, 2018, McKenzie was claimed off waivers by the Bills.

==== 2018 ====
McKenzie was used as the primary kick returner, but also saw significant time on offense. He scored his first NFL touchdown, rushing 6 yards on a jet sweep, against the Jacksonville Jaguars on November 25. Against the New York Jets, he was used in the run game after LeSean McCoy and Chris Ivory suffered injuries, rushing for 22 yards on four carries with another touchdown to go with 47 receiving yards in the 27–23 loss. He had 18 receptions for 179 receiving yards to go along with 66 rushing yards and two rushing touchdowns on the season.

==== 2019 ====
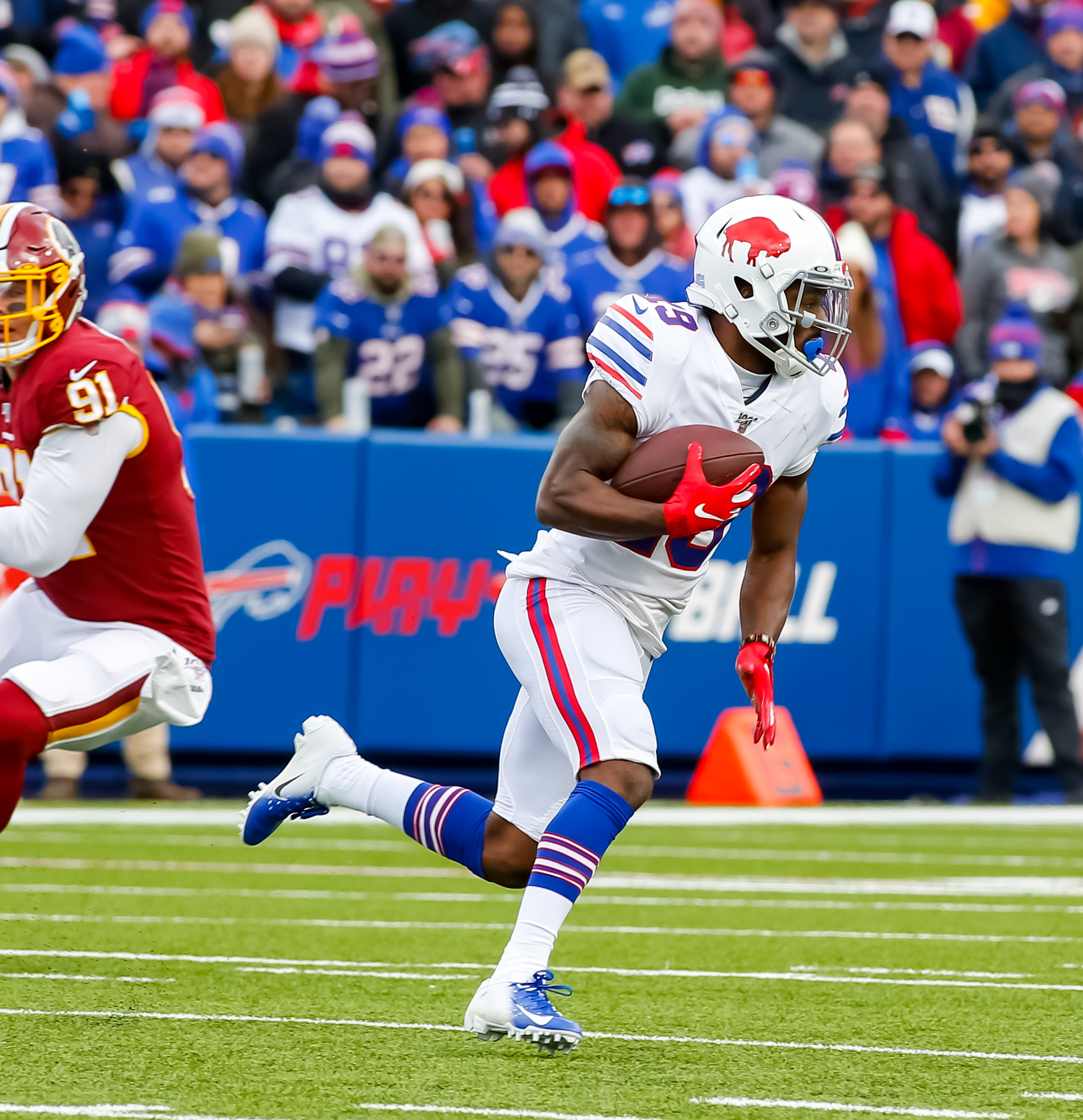
McKenzie in a game against the Washington Redskins in 2019

McKenzie's kick return role decreased after the Bills added free agent kick returner Andre Roberts, but he still found decent playing time on special teams and as a gadget player on offense. He caught 27 passes for 254 yards and a touchdown, in addition to rushing 8 times for 49 yards. McKenzie played a big role in helping the Bills defeat the Tennessee Titans in week 5, as his 46-yard reception helped set up the game-winning touchdown.

For the Bills' final game of the 2019 season, against the Jets, he was pressed into service as a reserve cornerback, as the Bills were resting the starters and the backups suffered injuries.

==== 2020 ====
On March 30, 2020, McKenzie re-signed with the Bills.

On November 15, 2020, in a Week 10 game against the Arizona Cardinals, McKenzie threw a 12-yard touchdown pass to quarterback Josh Allen on a trick play during the 32–30 loss. This was McKenzie's first career touchdown pass. In the Bills' final game of the 2020 season against the Miami Dolphins, McKenzie had arguably his best game as a professional, catching six passes for 65 yards and two touchdowns. He also returned a punt 84 yards for a touchdown, his first career special teams score on his only punt return of the season.

In the AFC Championship against the Kansas City Chiefs, McKenzie recorded one catch for a six-yard touchdown during the 38–24 loss.

==== 2021 ====
On March 29, 2021, McKenzie signed a one-year, $1.15 million contract with the Bills.

On August 26, 2021, McKenzie was fined $14,650 for violating the NFL's COVID-19 protocol.

McKenzie became the primary kick returner in 2021, but was benched after fumbling a kickoff in a loss to the Indianapolis Colts. Due to starting slot receiver Cole Beasley being diagnosed with COVID-19 prior to a pivotal week 16 game against the New England Patriots, McKenzie had a career day with 11 receptions for 125 yards and a touchdown as the Bills beat the Patriots 33–21.

==== 2022 ====
On March 13, 2022, McKenzie signed a two-year extension with the Buffalo Bills. McKenzie had a hot start to the season as the Bills' primary slot receiver with Beasley's departure from the team, catching 17 passes for 162 yards and three touchdowns within the first six games. He was also the leading receiver for the Bills during a Thanksgiving game against the Detroit Lions. He finished the season with a career high of 42 receptions, 423 yards, and four touchdowns.

On March 17, 2023, McKenzie was released by the Bills.

=== Indianapolis Colts ===
On March 22, 2023, McKenzie signed with the Colts. The Colts suspended him for three games for conduct detrimental to the team on December 19.

=== New York Giants ===
On March 12, 2024, McKenzie signed with the New York Giants He was released on August 27.

=== Miami Dolphins ===
On December 17, 2024, McKenzie was signed to the Miami Dolphins practice squad.

== NFL career statistics ==
Legend
	Led the league
**Bold**	Career high

=== Regular season ===
Year	Team	Games		Receiving					Rushing					Returning					Fumbles	
Year	Team	GP	GS	Rec	Yds	Y/R	Lng	TD	Att	Yds	Y/A	Lng	TD	Ret	Yds	Y/R	Lng	TD	Fum	Lost
2017	DEN	11	0	4	29	7.3	14	0	1	4	4.0	4	0	24	233	9.7	44	0	**6**	**3**
2018	DEN	1	0	0	0	—	0	0	0	0	—	0	0	2	13	6.5	11	0	0	0
2018	BUF	7	1	18	179	**9.9**	23	0	**10**	**66**	**6.6**	15	**2**	26	324	12.5	33	0	2	1
2019	BUF	15	**8**	27	254	9.4	**46**	1	8	49	6.1	16	0	4	69	17.3	24	0	0	0
2020	BUF	**16**	7	30	282	9.4	**46**	**5**	**10**	9	0.9	14	0	3	116	**38.7**	**84**	**1** (Note: Led the league in punts returned (1).)	0	0
2021	BUF	15	2	20	178	8.9	28	1	9	47	5.2	10	1	**43**	**731**	17.0	75	0	2	1
2022	BUF	15	**8**	**42**	**423**	10.1	30	4	9	55	6.1	**18**	1	6	144	24.0	42	0	0	0
2023	IND	10	0	11	82	7.5	30	0	2	11	5.5	7	0	22	265	12.0	42	0	2	0
Career		90	26	152	1,427	9.4	46	11	49	241	4.9	18	4	108	1,630	15.1	84	1	12	5

=== Postseason ===
Year	Team	Games		Receiving					Rushing					Returning					Fumbles	
Year	Team	GP	GS	Rec	Yds	Y/R	Lng	TD	Att	Yds	Y/A	Lng	TD	Ret	Yds	Y/R	Lng	TD	Fum	Lost
2019	BUF	1	0	**4**	23	5.8	10	0	0	0	—	0	0	0	0	—	0	0	0	0
2020	BUF	**3**	0	3	14	4.7	7	**1**	2	9	4.5	5	0	0	0	—	0	0	0	0
2021	BUF	2	**1**	**4**	**48**	**12.0**	**19**	0	**6**	**44**	**7.3**	**15**	0	**5**	**57**	**11.4**	**22**	0	0	0
2022	BUF	1	**1**	2	10	5.0	8	0	0	0	0.0	0	0	0	0	—	0	0	0	0
Career		7	2	13	95	7.3	19	1	8	53	6.6	15	0	5	57	11.4	22	0	0	0

== Business ventures ==
In 2020, McKenzie and his friends Mel Rodriguez and Chase McKenzie opened LaTraila Barbecue, a restaurant in Miami Lakes, Florida.
