= 2020 Buffalo Bills season =

61st season in franchise history; first division title and playoff win since 1995

- Owner: Terry and Kim Pegula
- General manager: Brandon Beane
- Head coach: Sean McDermott
- Offensive coordinator: Brian Daboll
- Defensive coordinator: Leslie Frazier
- Home stadium: Bills Stadium

Results
- Record: 13–3
- Division place: 1st AFC East
- Playoffs: Won Wild Card Playoffs (vs. Colts) 27–24; Won Divisional Playoffs (vs. Ravens) 17–3; Lost AFC Championship (at Chiefs) 24–38
- All-Pros: 5: WR Stefon Diggs (1st team); QB Josh Allen (2nd team); WR Cole Beasley (2nd team); CB Tre'Davious White (2nd team); RS Andre Roberts (2nd team)
- Pro Bowlers: 5: QB Josh Allen; WR Stefon Diggs; MLB Tremaine Edmunds; CB Tre'Davious White; RS Andre Roberts

Uniform
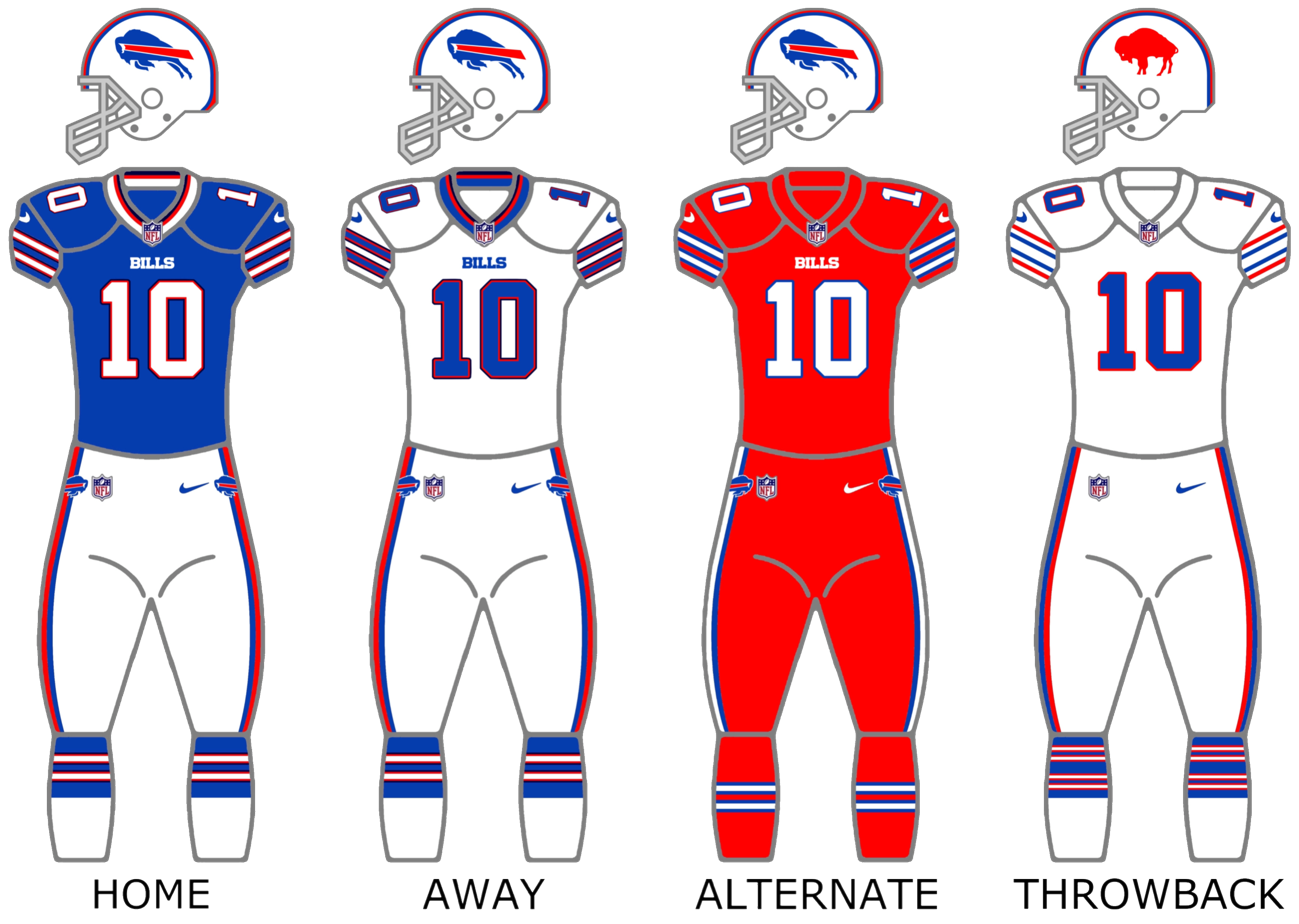

The 2020 season was the Buffalo Bills' 61st as a franchise, 51st in the National Football League (NFL), the sixth full season under the ownership of Terry and Kim Pegula and fourth under the head coach/general manager tandem of Sean McDermott and Brandon Beane. After acquiring players such as Stefon Diggs, Mario Addison, and A. J. Klein during the offseason, the Bills offense, led by quarterback Josh Allen, took another step forward, scoring an at the time franchise-record 501 points and leading the Bills to 13 wins in the regular season, and their first playoff wins and first AFC Championship appearance of the 21st century.

The Bills began the season strong with a 4–0 start, their first since 2008. Despite two straight losses afterwards, with both of their games during their losing streak postponed due to a COVID-19 outbreak within the Tennessee Titans' organization, the Bills won 9 of their final 10 games, with their only loss during that span being the "Hail Murray" game against the Arizona Cardinals, to finish on a six-game winning streak with a 13–3 record, improving on their 10–6 record from 2019 and tying the franchise record set in the Super Bowl seasons of 1990 and 1991.

In addition to returning to the playoffs for the third time in four years after previously going 17 consecutive seasons without a playoff appearance, the team won the AFC East division title for the first time since 1995 (during the Marv Levy/Jim Kelly era) after a 48–19 win over the Denver Broncos in Week 15, becoming only the second team other than the 2008 Miami Dolphins to win the division over the New England Patriots since the New York Jets in 2002. Not only did they sweep the Patriots for the first time since 1999, but the Bills swept their entire division for the first time in franchise history. They also qualified for the playoffs in consecutive years for the first time since 1998 and 1999 (during the Wade Phillips/Doug Flutie era), which was also the last time the Bills had back-to-back double-digit-win seasons. This was the first of five straight AFC East titles for the Bills.

The #2 seed Bills began their playoff run in the Wild Card Round against the #7 seed Indianapolis Colts, winning 27–24 for their first playoff victory since 1995. After this, they defeated the #5 seed Baltimore Ravens 17–3 in the Divisional Round, advancing to their first AFC Championship Game since 1993, where they faced the #1 seed and defending Super Bowl champion Kansas City Chiefs, who they coincidentally faced in their last AFC Championship Game appearance. The Bills would lose 38–24.

The Bills would not make another AFC Championship game appearance until 2024. Coincidentally, the Bills would face the Chiefs in the AFC Championship that year as well.

== Draft ==
2020 Buffalo Bills draft
Draft order		Player name	Position	College	Contract	Notes
Round	Selection	Player name	Position	College	Contract	Notes
1	22	Traded to the Minnesota Vikings (Note: The Bills traded their first-, fifth- and sixth-round selections and 2021 fourth-round selection to the Minnesota Vikings in exchange for Minnesota's seventh-round selection (CB Dane Jackson) and WR Stefon Diggs.)				
2	54	A. J. Epenesa	DE	Iowa		
3	86	Zack Moss	RB	Utah		
4	128	Gabe Davis	WR	UCF		
5	155	Traded to the Minnesota Vikings				From Browns (Note: The Bills traded a 2021 seventh-round selection and G Wyatt Teller to the Cleveland Browns in exchange for Cleveland's fifth- and sixth-round selections (155th and 188th overall).)
5	167	Jake Fromm	QB	Georgia		
6	188	Tyler Bass	K	Georgia Southern		From Browns
6	201	Isaiah Hodgins	WR	Oregon State		
6	207	Traded to the Minnesota Vikings				From Ravens via Patriots (Note: The Bills traded C Russell Bodine to the New England Patriots in exchange for the sixth-round selection New England acquired from the Baltimore Ravens.)
7	236	Traded to the Cleveland Browns (Note: The Bills traded a seventh-round selection to the Cleveland Browns in exchange for WR Corey Coleman.)				
7	239	Dane Jackson	CB	Pittsburgh		From Vikings

Draft trades

=== Undrafted free agents ===
2020 Buffalo Bills Undrafted Free Agents
Name	Position	College	Ref.
Trey Adams	OT	Washington	
Ike Brown	CB	FIU	
Reggie Gilliam	FB	Toledo	
Marquel Harrell	G	Auburn	
Garrett Taylor	S	Penn State	
Josh Thomas	S	Appalachian State	
Brandon Walton	OT	Florida Atlantic	
Antonio Williams	RB	North Carolina	

== Staff ==
2020 Buffalo Bills staff
Front office: Owner/CEO – Terry Pegula; Owner/president – Kim Pegula; General manager – Brandon Beane; Assistant general manager – Joe Schoen; Director of player personnel – Dan Morgan; Director of college scouting – Terrance Gray; Senior VP of football administration – Jim Overdorf; Assistant director of college scouting – Lake Dawson; Director of pro personnel – Malik Boyd; Director of football administration – Kevin Meganck; Director of football operations – Brendan Rowe; Head coaches: Head coach – Sean McDermott; Assistant head coach/defensive coordinator – Leslie Frazier; Offensive coaches: Offensive coordinator – Brian Daboll; Quarterbacks – Ken Dorsey; Assistant quarterbacks – Shea Tierney; Running backs – Kelly Skipper; Wide receivers – Chad Hall; Assistant wide receivers/game management – Marc Lubick; Tight ends – Rob Boras; Offensive line – Bobby Johnson; Assistant offensive line – Terry Heffernan; Assistant offensive line – Ryan Wendell	Defensive coaches: Defensive line – Eric Washington; Assistant defensive line – Jacques Cesaire; Linebackers – Bob Babich; Defensive backs – John Butler; Safeties – Bobby Babich; Nickel – Jim Salgado; Defensive quality control/assistant linebackers – John Egorugwu; Special teams coaches: Special teams coordinator – Heath Farwell; Assistant special teams – Matthew Smiley; Strength and conditioning: Head strength and conditioning – Eric Ciano; Assistant strength and conditioning – Will Greenberg; Assistant strength and conditioning – Hal Luther; Strength and conditioning assistant – Mark Loecher; Strength and conditioning assistant – Jason Oszvart

== Final roster ==
2020 Buffalo Bills roster
Quarterbacks (QB): 17 Josh Allen; 5 Matt Barkley; 10 Jake Fromm; Running backs (RB): 25 Taiwan Jones; 26 Devin Singletary; 22 T. J. Yeldon; Wide receivers (WR): 11 Cole Beasley; 15 John Brown; 13 Gabe Davis; 14 Stefon Diggs; 19 Isaiah McKenzie; 18 Andre Roberts; Tight ends (TE): 86 Reggie Gilliam; 88 Dawson Knox; 81 Tyler Kroft; 85 Lee Smith	Offensive linemen (OL): 71 Ryan Bates C/T; 65 Ike Boettger G; 73 Dion Dawkins T; 68 Jordan Devey G; 76 Jon Feliciano G/C; 60 Mitch Morse C; 77 Ty Nsekhe T; 75 Daryl Williams T; 66 Brian Winters G; Defensive linemen (DL): 97 Mario Addison DE; 94 Vernon Butler DT; 57 A. J. Epenesa DE; 55 Jerry Hughes DE; 90 Quinton Jefferson DT; 92 Darryl Johnson DE; 93 Trent Murphy DE; 91 Ed Oliver DT; 99 Harrison Phillips DT; 61 Justin Zimmer DT	Linebackers (LB): 53 Tyrel Dodson MLB/OLB; 49 Tremaine Edmunds MLB; 54 A. J. Klein OLB; 44 Tyler Matakevich MLB; 58 Matt Milano OLB; 59 Andre Smith OLB; Defensive backs (DB): 23 Micah Hyde FS; 46 Jaquan Johnson FS; 24 Taron Johnson CB; 31 Dean Marlowe FS/SS; 33 Siran Neal CB; 29 Josh Norman CB; 21 Jordan Poyer SS; 39 Levi Wallace CB; 27 Tre'Davious White CB; Special teams (ST): 2 Tyler Bass K; 9 Corey Bojorquez P; 69 Reid Ferguson LS	Practice squad: 72 Trey Adams T; 84 Nate Becker TE; 74 Brandin Bryant DT; 51 Bryan Cox Jr. DE; 32 Devonta Freeman RB (Protected); 87 Tanner Gentry WR; 79 Jonotthan Harrison C (Protected); 30 Dane Jackson CB; 52 Darron Lee OLB; 56 Mike Love DE; 80 Kenny Stills WR (Protected); 36 Josh Thomas SS; -- Tristan Vizcaino K; 45 Christian Wade RB (IPP); 7 Davis Webb QB; 35 Antonio Williams RB (Protected); 82 Duke Williams WR; Reserve: 70 Cody Ford G (IR); 28 E. J. Gaines CB (Opt-out); 16 Isaiah Hodgins WR (IR); 47 Cam Lewis CB (IR); 98 Star Lotulelei DT (Opt-out); 20 Zack Moss RB (IR); 89 Tommy Sweeney TE (COVID-19); Rookies in italics 53 active, 7 reserve, 16 practice squad (1 exempt)

== Preseason ==
The Bills' preseason schedule was announced on May 7, 2020, but was later cancelled due to the COVID-19 pandemic.

Week	Date	Opponent	Venue	Result
1	August 14	at Baltimore Ravens	M&T Bank Stadium	Cancelled due to the COVID-19 pandemic
2	August 21	Atlanta Falcons	Bills Stadium	Cancelled due to the COVID-19 pandemic
3	August 29	Indianapolis Colts	Bills Stadium	Cancelled due to the COVID-19 pandemic
4	September 3	at Detroit Lions	Ford Field	Cancelled due to the COVID-19 pandemic

== Regular season ==
=== Schedule ===
The Bills' 2020 schedule was announced on May 7.

Week	Date	Opponent	Result	Record	Venue	Recap
1	September 13	**New York Jets**	**W** 27–17	1–0	Bills Stadium	Recap
2	September 20	at **Miami Dolphins**	**W** 31–28	2–0	Hard Rock Stadium	Recap
3	September 27	Los Angeles Rams	**W** 35–32	3–0	Bills Stadium	Recap
4	October 4	at Las Vegas Raiders	**W** 30–23	4–0	Allegiant Stadium	Recap
5 (Note: Due to a COVID-19 outbreak within the Tennessee Titans' organization, the Bills-Titans game during Week 5 was rescheduled from October 11 to October 13, contingent on no more positive COVID-19 tests from the Titans. As a result, the Bills' Week 6 game vs. the Kansas City Chiefs, originally scheduled for October 15 (Thursday), was moved to October 19 (Monday).)	October 13	at Tennessee Titans	**L** 16–42	4–1	Nissan Stadium	Recap
6	October 19	Kansas City Chiefs	**L** 17–26	4–2	Bills Stadium	Recap
7	October 25	at **New York Jets**	**W** 18–10	5–2	MetLife Stadium	Recap
8	November 1	**New England Patriots**	**W** 24–21	6–2	Bills Stadium	Recap
9	November 8	Seattle Seahawks	**W** 44–34	7–2	Bills Stadium	Recap
10	November 15	at Arizona Cardinals	**L** 30–32	7–3	State Farm Stadium	Recap
11	Bye					
12	November 29	Los Angeles Chargers	**W** 27–17	8–3	Bills Stadium	Recap
13	December 7	at San Francisco 49ers	**W** 34–24	9–3	State Farm Stadium (Note: Due to a ban on all contact sports imposed by California's Santa Clara County as a result from rising COVID-19 cases, the Bills' Week 13 game at the San Francisco 49ers was moved from Levi's Stadium to State Farm Stadium.)	Recap
14	December 13	Pittsburgh Steelers	**W** 26–15	10–3	Bills Stadium	Recap
15	December 19	at Denver Broncos	**W** 48–19	11–3	Empower Field at Mile High	Recap
16	December 28	at **New England Patriots**	**W** 38–9	12–3	Gillette Stadium	Recap
17	January 3	**Miami Dolphins**	**W** 56–26	13–3	Bills Stadium	Recap

Note: Intra-division opponents are in bold text.

=== Game summaries ===
==== Week 1: vs. New York Jets ====
Week 1: New York Jets at Buffalo Bills – Game summary

Quarter	1	2	3	4	Total
Jets	0	3	7	7	**17**
**Bills**	14	7	0	6	**27**

at Bills Stadium, Orchard Park, New York

- Date: September 13
- Game time: 1:00 p.m. EDT
- Game weather: Cloudy, 67 °F (19 °C)
- Game attendance: 0
- Referee: Shawn Smith
- TV announcers (CBS): Andrew Catalon, James Lofton and A.J. Ross
- Recap, Game Book

Game information

**First quarter**

- BUF – Josh Allen 2-yards run (Tyler Bass kick), 5:38. Bills 7–0. **Drive: 7 plays, 55 yards, 3:54.**
- BUF – Zack Moss 2-yards pass from Josh Allen (Tyler Bass kick), 2:32. Bills 14–0. **Drive: 6 plays, 82 yards, 2:35.**

**Second quarter**

- BUF – John Brown 17-yards pass from Josh Allen (Tyler Bass kick), 6:48. Bills 21–0. **Drive: 14 plays, 68 yards, 7:58.**
- NYJ – Sam Ficken 31-yards field goal, 0:00. Bills 21–3. **Drive: 10 plays, 75 yards, 1:27.**

**Third quarter**

- NYJ – Jamison Crowder 69-yards pass from Sam Darnold (Sam Ficken kick), 5:10. Bills 21–10. **Drive: 3 plays, 72 yards, 0:48.**

**Fourth quarter**

- BUF – Tyler Bass 22-yards field goal, 10:38. Bills 24–10. **Drive: 10 plays, 34 yards, 3:49.**
- BUF – Tyler Bass 19-yards field goal, 3:15. Bills 27–10. **Drive: 11 plays, 63 yards, 6:29.**
- NYJ – Josh Adams 2-yards run (Sam Ficken kick), 0:54. Bills 27–17. **Drive: 11 plays, 86 yards, 2:21.**

**Top scorers**

- NYJ – Sam Darnold 21/35, 215 yards, TD, INT
- BUF – Josh Allen 33/46, 312 yards, 2 TD

**Top rushers**

- NYJ – Frank Gore 6 rushes, 24 yards
- BUF – Josh Allen 14 rushes, 57 yards, TD

**Top receivers**

- NYJ – Jamison Crowder 7 receptions, 115 yards, TD
- BUF – Stefon Diggs 8 receptions, 86 yards

Buffalo handily won after racing to a 21–0 second quarter lead. Quarterback Josh Allen surpassed 300 passing yards for the first time in his career—throwing for 312, to be exact—and rushed 14 times for 57 yards as newly acquired receiver Stefon Diggs made his debut with the team. The defense largely shut down the Jets' offense aside from a field goal, a 69-yard touchdown pass from Sam Darnold to Jamison Crowder and a garbage-time touchdown in the fourth quarter, though rookie kicker Tyler Bass struggled in his debut, missing two of his four field goal attempts.

==== Week 2: at Miami Dolphins ====
Week 2: Buffalo Bills at Miami Dolphins – Game summary

Quarter	1	2	3	4	Total
**Bills**	7	10	0	14	**31**
Dolphins	7	3	3	15	**28**

at Hard Rock Stadium, Miami Gardens, Florida

- Date: September 20
- Game time: 1:00 p.m. EDT
- Game weather: Cloudy, 90 °F (32 °C)
- Game attendance: 11,075
- Referee: Jerome Boger
- TV announcers (CBS): Spero Dedes and Adam Archuleta
- Recap, Game Book

Game information

**First quarter**

- BUF – Reggie Gilliam 1-yard pass from Josh Allen (Tyler Bass kick), 4:55 Bills 7–0. **Drive: 11 plays, 97 yards, 5:19.**
- MIA – DeVante Parker 2-yard pass from Ryan Fitzpatrick (Jason Sanders kick), 0:38 Tied 7–7. **Drive: 10 plays, 75 yards, 4:17.**

**Second quarter**

- BUF – Stefon Diggs 22-yard pass from Josh Allen (Tyler Bass kick), 11:40 Bills 14–7. **Drive: 5 plays, 84 yards, 2:58.**
- BUF – Tyler Bass 39-yard pass from Josh Allen (Tyler Bass kick), 2:30 Bills 17–7. **Drive: 13 plays, 73 yards, 6:13.**
- MIA – Jason Sanders 52-yard field goal, 0:02 Bills 17–10. **Drive: 5 plays, 41 yards, 0:31.**

**Third quarter**

- MIA – Jason Sanders 45-yard field goal, 11:18 Bills 17–13. **Drive: 8 plays, 48 yards, 3:42.**

**Fourth quarter**

- MIA – Jordan Howard 2-yard run (Jason Sanders kick), 10:11 Dolphins 20–17. **Drive: 10 plays, 44 yards, 5:13.**
- BUF – Gabe Davis 6-yard pass from Josh Allen (Tyler Bass kick), 5:55 Bills 24–20. **Drive: 7 plays, 75 yards, 4:16.**
- BUF – John Brown 46-yard pass from Josh Allen (Tyler Bass kick), 3:09 Bills 31–20. **Drive: 5 plays, 71 yards, 1:17.**
- MIA – Mike Gesicki 8-yard pass from Ryan Fitzpatrick (Ryan Fitzpatrick–Preston Williams pass), 0:49 Bills 31–28. **Drive: 9 plays, 75 yards, 2:20.**

**Top passers**

- BUF – Josh Allen – 24/35, 415 yards, 4 TD
- MIA – Ryan Fitzpatrick – 31/47, 328 yards, 2 TD

**Top rushers**

- BUF – Devin Singletary – 10 rushes, 56 yards
- MIA – Myles Gaskin – 7 rushes, 46 yards

**Top receivers**

- BUF – Stefon Diggs – 8 receptions, 153 yards, TD
- MIA – Mike Gesicki – 8 receptions, 130 yards, TD

In a back-and-forth affair against the rival Dolphins and former Bills quarterback Ryan Fitzpatrick, Josh Allen sealed the game for the Bills with two fourth-quarter touchdown passes to rookie Gabe Davis and John Brown, respectively, as the defense was playing without starting linebackers Tremaine Edmunds and Matt Milano. Stefon Diggs also caught his first touchdown as a Buffalo Bill, which occurred during a power outage at Hard Rock Stadium in the second quarter that temporarily prevented CBS from airing the game. With the win, Buffalo improved to 2–0, as Allen threw for a career-high in passing yards with 415.

==== Week 3: vs. Los Angeles Rams ====
Week 3: Los Angeles Rams at Buffalo Bills – Game summary

Quarter	1	2	3	4	Total
Rams	0	3	14	15	**32**
**Bills**	7	14	7	7	**35**

at Bills Stadium, Orchard Park, New York

- Date: September 27
- Game time: 1:00 p.m. EDT
- Game weather: Sunny, 79 °F (26 °C)
- Game attendance: 0
- Referee: Alex Kemp
- TV announcers (Fox): Chris Myers, Greg Jennings, Brock Huard and Jen Hale
- Recap, Game Book

Game information

**First quarter**

- BUF – Lee Smith 1-yard pass from Josh Allen (Tyler Bass kick), 1:41. Bills 7–0. **Drive: 11 plays, 57 yards, 6:26.**

**Second quarter**

- BUF – Josh Allen 1-yard run (Tyler Bass kick), 10:04. Bills 14–0. **Drive: 7 plays, 66 yards, 3:55.**
- LAR – Samuel Sloman 30-yard field goal, 3:09. Bills 14–3. **Drive: 13 plays, 63 yards, 6:55.**
- BUF – Tyler Kroft 3-yard pass from Josh Allen (Tyler Bass kick), 0:38. Bills 21–3. **Drive: 8 plays, 75 yards, 2:31.**

**Third quarter**

- BUF – Stefon Diggs 4-yard pass from Josh Allen (Tyler Bass kick), 8:05. Bills 28–3. **Drive: 7 plays, 52 yards, 4:16.**
- LAR – Jared Goff 1-yard run (Samuel Sloman kick), 4:47. Bills 28–10. **Drive: 8 plays, 75 yards, 3:18.**
- LAR – Robert Woods 25-yard pass from Jared Goff (Sam Sloman kick), 2:52. Bills 28-17. **Drive: 3 plays, 59 yards, 1:21.**

**Fourth quarter**

- LAR – Cooper Kupp 16-yard pass from Jared Goff (Jared Goff–Tyler Higbee pass), 10:34. Bills 28-25. **Drive: 10 plays, 97 yards, 5:43.**
- LAR – Darrell Henderson 1-yard run (Samuel Sloman kick), 4:30. Rams 32–28. **Drive: 6 plays, 37 yards, 2:55.**
- BUF – Tyler Kroft 3-yard pass from Josh Allen (Tyler Bass kick), 0:15. Bills 35–32. **Drive: 11 plays, 75 yards, 4:15.**

**Top passers**

- LAR – Jared Goff – 23/32, 321 yards, 2 TD, INT
- BUF – Josh Allen – 24/33, 311 yards, 4 TD, INT

**Top rushers**

- LAR – Darrell Henderson – 20 rushes, 114 yards, TD
- BUF – Devin Singletary – 13 rushes, 71 yards

**Top receivers**

- LAR – Cooper Kupp – 9 receptions, 107 yards, TD
- BUF – Cole Beasley – 6 receptions, 100 yards

Buffalo raced to a 28–3 lead in the middle of the third quarter, but after a pass from Josh Allen to TE Tyler Kroft was controversially ruled an interception for Los Angeles as Rams DB John Johnson III grabbed the ball moments after Kroft caught it, the Rams stormed back with five scoring drives to erase the deficit and take the lead in the fourth quarter. Allen would nonetheless lead a game-winning drive in the final four minutes of the game, including three crucial passes to WR Cole Beasley, capping it off with a touchdown pass to Kroft following a defensive pass interference call on Darious Williams on 4th and 9. With the win, not only did Buffalo start 3–0 for the second year in a row, but for the third week in a row, Allen threw for over 300 yards.

==== Week 4: at Las Vegas Raiders ====
Week 4: Buffalo Bills at Las Vegas Raiders – Game summary

Quarter	1	2	3	4	Total
**Bills**	7	10	0	13	**30**
Raiders	3	10	3	7	**23**

at Allegiant Stadium, Paradise, Nevada

- Date: October 4
- Game time: 4:25 p.m. EDT/1:25 p.m. PDT
- Game weather: None (indoor stadium)
- Game attendance: 0
- Referee: Land Clark
- TV announcers (CBS): Spero Dedes and Adam Archuleta
- Recap, Game Book

Game information

**First quarter**

- BUF – Gabe Davis 26-yard pass from Josh Allen (Tyler Bass kick), 10:37. Bills 7–0. **Drive: 8 plays, 75 yards, 4:23.**
- LV – Daniel Carlson 54-yard field goal, 5:07. Bills 7–3. **Drive: 12 plays, 48 yards, 5:30.**

**Second quarter**

- BUF – Cole Beasley 11-yard pass from Josh Allen (Tyler Bass kick), 14:48. Bills 14–3. **Drive: 11 plays, 75 yards, 5:14.**
- LV – Daniel Carlson 39-yard field goal, 9:43. Bills 14–6. **Drive: 12 plays, 54 yards, 5:10.**
- BUF – Tyler Bass 34-yard field goal, 4:13. Bills 17–6. **Drive: 11 plays, 59 yards, 5:25.**
- LV – Jason Witten 3-yard pass from Derek Carr (Daniel Carlson kick), 0:13. Bills 17–13. **Drive: 11 plays, 75 yards, 4:00.**

**Third quarter**

- LV – Daniel Carlson 25-yard field goal, 8:41. Bills 17–16. **Drive: 11 plays, 68 yards, 6:19.**

**Fourth quarter**

- BUF – Josh Allen 1-yard run (kick failed), 14:49. Bills 23–16. **Drive: 6 plays, 45 yards, 2:34.**
- BUF – Devin Singletary 2-yard run (Tyler Bass kick), 11:17. Bills 30–16. **Drive: 4 plays, 60 yards, 1:11.**
- LV – Nelson Agholor 7-yard pass from Derek Carr (Daniel Carlson kick), 1:29. Bills 30–23. **Drive: 8 plays, 80 yards, 2:02.**

**Top passers**

- BUF – Josh Allen – 24/34, 288 yards, 2 TD
- LV – Derek Carr – 32/44, 311 yards, 2 TD

**Top rushers**

- BUF – Devin Singletary – 18 rushes, 55 yards, TD
- LV – Josh Jacobs – 15 rushes, 48 yards

**Top receivers**

- BUF – Stefon Diggs – 6 receptions, 115 yards
- LV – Darren Waller – 9 receptions, 88 yards

Buffalo scored on the opening drive of the game when Josh Allen found a wide open Gabe Davis for a 26-yard touchdown. The Bills would not lose the lead for the remainder of the game, with Allen continuing his hot start to the season. Late in the second quarter, Allen scrambled and found Stefon Diggs for a 9-yard gain, but took a big hit from Raiders DE Arden Key, resulting in an injury to his left shoulder. He would return, however, and score on a 1-yard quarterback sneak, along with 136 yards passing in the second half, with his longest being a 49-yard throw to Diggs. Buffalo would win and go to 4–0 for the first time since 2008 (the team started 4–0 that season before losing nine of their final 12 games).

==== Week 5: at Tennessee Titans ====
Week 5: Buffalo Bills at Tennessee Titans – Game summary

Quarter	1	2	3	4	Total
Bills	7	3	0	6	**16**
**Titans**	7	14	7	14	**42**

at Nissan Stadium, Nashville, Tennessee

- Date: October 13
- Game time: 7:00 p.m. EDT/6:00 p.m. CDT
- Game weather: Sunny, 73 °F (23 °C)
- Game attendance: 8,403
- Referee: Carl Cheffers
- TV announcers (CBS): Tom McCarthy, Jay Feely and A.J. Ross
- Recap, Game Book

Game information

**First quarter**

- TEN – A. J. Brown 16-yard pass from Ryan Tannehill (Stephen Gostkowski kick), 12:45. Titans 7–0. **Drive: 2 plays, 16 yards, 0:44.**
- BUF – Isaiah McKenzie 3-yard pass from Josh Allen (Tyler Bass kick), 6:02. Tied 7–7. **Drive: 15 plays, 76 yards, 6:43.**

**Second quarter**

- TEN – Derrick Henry 1-yard run (Stephen Gostkowski kick), 13:54. Titans 14–7. **Drive: 7 plays, 30 yards, 3:05.**
- BUF – Tyler Bass 43-yard field goal, 8:35. Titans 14–10. **Drive: 10 plays, 50 yards, 5:19.**
- TEN – Ryan Tannehill 10-yard run (Stephen Gostkowski kick), 0:16. Titans 21–10. **Drive: 12 plays, 90 yards, 2:39.**

**Third quarter**

- TEN – Jonnu Smith 4-yard pass from Ryan Tannehill (Stephen Gostkowski kick), 1:49. Titans 28–10. **Drive: 3 plays, 12 yards, 1:16.**

**Fourth quarter**

- BUF – T. J. Yeldon 22-yard pass from Josh Allen (pass failed), 10:00. Titans 28–16. **Drive: 14 plays, 90 yards, 6:49.**
- TEN – Derrick Henry 9-yard run (Stephen Gostkowski kick), 3:57. Titans 35–16. **Drive: 11 plays, 75 yards, 6:03.**
- TEN – Jonnu Smith 7-yard pass from Ryan Tannehill (Stephen Gostkowski kick), 1:59. Titans 42–16. **Drive: 6 plays, 18 yards, 1:50.**

**Top passers**

- BUF – Josh Allen – 26/41, 263 yards, 2 TD, 2 INT
- TEN – Ryan Tannehill – 21/28, 195 yards, 3 TD

**Top rushers**

- BUF – T. J. Yeldon – 7 rushes, 52 yards
- TEN – Derrick Henry – 19 rushes, 57 yards, 2 TD

**Top receivers**

- BUF – Stefon Diggs – 10 receptions, 106 yards
- TEN – AJ Brown – 7 receptions, 82 yards, TD

Due to a COVID-19 outbreak within the Titans organization, the game was at first postponed from Sunday to the following Tuesday, marking the first time since 2010 that an NFL regular-season game was played on a Tuesday. In a battle of unbeaten teams, the Bills, missing starters such as Matt Milano, John Brown, Quinton Spain and Tre'Davious White, were unable to contain Titans quarterback Ryan Tannehill, who scored four overall touchdowns on the Bills defense. To make matters worse, three turnovers by Buffalo allowed for short fields and quick touchdowns for the Titans. With their first loss of the season and first loss to Tennessee since 2012, the Bills fell to 4–1.

==== Week 6: vs. Kansas City Chiefs ====
Week 6: Kansas City Chiefs at Buffalo Bills – Game summary

Quarter	1	2	3	4	Total
**Chiefs**	7	6	7	6	**26**
Bills	3	7	0	7	**17**

at Bills Stadium, Orchard Park, New York

- Date: October 19
- Game time: 5:00 p.m. EDT
- Game weather: Cloudy with showers, 51 °F (11 °C)
- Game attendance: 0
- Referee: Ronald Torbert
- TV announcers (Fox/NFLN/Amazon Prime Video): Joe Buck, Troy Aikman, Erin Andrews and Kristina Pink
- Recap, Game Book

Game information

**First quarter**

- BUF – Tyler Bass 48-yard field goal, 5:42. Bills 3–0. **Drive: 11 plays, 38 yards, 4:27.**
- KC – Travis Kelce 11-yard pass from Patrick Mahomes (Harrison Butker kick), 3:05. Chiefs 7–3. **Drive: 5 plays, 75 yards, 2:37.**

**Second quarter**

- BUF – Stefon Diggs 4-yard pass from Josh Allen (Tyler Bass kick), 11:22. Bills 10–7. **Drive: 13 plays, 75 yards, 6:43.**
- KC – Travis Kelce 12-yard pass from Patrick Mahomes (kick failed), 4:56. Chiefs 13–10. **Drive: 12 plays, 75 yards, 6:26.**

**Third quarter**

- KC – Darrel Williams 13-yard run (Harrison Butker kick), 1:18. Chiefs 20–10. **Drive: 13 plays, 82 yards, 7:47.**

**Fourth quarter**

- KC – Harrison Butker 37-yard field goal, 9:07. Chiefs 23–10. **Drive: 10 plays, 75 yards, 5:20.**
- BUF – Cole Beasley 8-yard pass from Josh Allen (Tyler Bass kick), 6:34. Chiefs 23–17. **Drive: 6 plays, 75 yards, 2:33.**
- KC – Harrison Butker 30-yard field goal, 1:56. Chiefs 26–17. **Drive: 12 plays, 75 yards, 4:38.**

**Top passers**

- KC – Patrick Mahomes – 21/26, 225 yards, 2 TD
- BUF – Josh Allen – 14/27, 122 yards, 2 TD, INT

**Top rushers**

- KC – Clyde Edwards-Helaire – 26 rushes, 161 yards
- BUF – Josh Allen – 8 rushes, 42 yards

**Top receivers**

- KC – Demarcus Robinson – 5 receptions, 69 yards
- BUF – Stefon Diggs – 6 receptions, 46 yards, TD

Despite holding the high-powered Kansas City offense to 13 points in the first half of a rain-soaked game postponed from the previous Thursday (due to the Titans game being pushed back to the previous Tuesday), the Bills defense was not able to contain Chiefs rookie RB Clyde Edwards-Helaire, who led Kansas City to 245 rushing yards, while the Bills offense was bottled up for the most part, despite numerous pass-interference penalties called on the Chiefs secondary and two Josh Allen TD passes to Diggs and Beasley. A missed field goal by the Bills at the end of the first half proved costly, as the Chiefs were able to go up by two scores with a late field goal, preventing a potential game-winning drive by the Bills. Instead, Allen was intercepted on the final drive with 1:20 remaining, sealing the win for the Chiefs. With the loss, Buffalo fell to 4–2.

==== Week 7: at New York Jets ====
Week 7: Buffalo Bills at New York Jets – Game summary

Quarter	1	2	3	4	Total
**Bills**	0	6	6	6	**18**
Jets	3	7	0	0	**10**

at MetLife Stadium, East Rutherford, New Jersey

- Date: October 25
- Game time: 1:00 p.m. EDT
- Game weather: Mostly cloudy, 52 °F (11 °C)
- Game attendance: 0
- Referee: Carl Cheffers
- TV announcers (CBS): Greg Gumbel, Rich Gannon and A.J. Ross
- Recap, Game Book

Game information

**First quarter**

- NYJ – Sergio Castillo 29-yard field goal, 8:46. Jets 3–0. **Drive: 11 plays, 67 yards, 6:14.**

**Second quarter**

- NYJ – La'Mical Perine 5-yard run (Sergio Castillo kick), 7:22. Jets 10–0. **Drive: 7 plays, 80 yards, 3:38.**
- BUF – Tyler Bass 53-yard field goal, 2:42. Jets 10–3. **Drive: 10 plays, 42 yards, 4:40.**
- BUF – Tyler Bass 48-yard field goal, 0:00. Jets 10–6. **Drive: 6 plays, 43 yards, 0:40.**

**Third quarter**

- BUF – Tyler Bass 46-yard field goal, 10:35. Jets 10–9. **Drive: 9 plays, 19 yards, 4:25.**
- BUF – Tyler Bass 37-yard field goal, 1:37. Bills 12–10. **Drive: 14 plays, 73 yards, 7:23.**

**Fourth quarter**

- BUF – Tyler Bass 29-yard field goal, 6:01. Bills 15–10. **Drive: 8 plays, 46 yards, 4:28.**
- BUF – Tyler Bass 40-yard field goal, 1:56. Bills 18–10. **Drive: 8 plays, 37 yards, 3:22.**

**Top passers**

- BUF – Josh Allen – 30/43, 307 yards
- NYJ – Sam Darnold – 12/23, 120 yards, 2 INT

**Top rushers**

- BUF – Josh Allen – 11 rushes, 61 yards
- NYJ – Frank Gore – 11 rushes, 60 yards

**Top receivers**

- BUF – Cole Beasley – 11 receptions, 112 yards
- NYJ – Denzel Mims – 4 receptions, 42 yards

In a rematch from Week 1, New York jumped to an early 10–0 lead following a strip-sack of Allen by Jets linebacker Tarell Basham, but the Bills would score 18 unanswered points, all field goals by Tyler Bass, who went 6-of-8 with his field goals on the day, to win an ugly game. The Bills moved the ball well outside the red zone and were never forced to punt. Despite early struggles, Buffalo's defense was outstanding after halftime, allowing just 4 total yards to the Jets offense in the second half. Buffalo improved to 5–2 with the win, snapping a two-game losing streak and sweeping the Jets for the first time since 2015 (former head coach Rex Ryan's first season with Buffalo after six seasons with the Jets; the Bills won both meetings that year 22–17, with the latter meeting eliminating the Jets from the playoffs). The Bills also became the first team since 1941 with no touchdowns and also no punts in a game.

==== Week 8: vs. New England Patriots ====
Week 8: New England Patriots at Buffalo Bills – Game summary

Quarter	1	2	3	4	Total
Patriots	0	6	8	7	**21**
**Bills**	7	0	7	10	**24**

at Bills Stadium, Orchard Park, New York

- Date: November 1
- Game time: 1:00 p.m. EST
- Game weather: Rain, 41 °F (5 °C)
- Game attendance: 0
- Referee: Clete Blakeman
- TV announcers (CBS): Ian Eagle, Charles Davis and Evan Washburn
- Recap, Game Book

Game information

**First quarter**

- BUF – Zack Moss 8-yard run (Tyler Bass kick), 5:29. Bills 7–0. **Drive: 10 plays, 78 yards, 5:10.**

**Second quarter**

- NE – Nick Folk 43-yard field goal, 10:50. Bills 7–3. **Drive: 8 plays, 44 yards, 4:10.**
- NE – Nick Folk 33-yard field goal, 0:08. Bills 7–6. **Drive: 7 plays, 34 yards, 1:30.**

**Third quarter**

- BUF – Zack Moss 4-yard run (Tyler Bass kick), 12:09. Bills 14–6. **Drive: 5 plays, 75 yards, 2:51.**
- NE – Damien Harris 22-yard run (Cam Newton-Jakobi Meyers pass), 3:03. Tied 14–14. **Drive: 5 plays, 37 yards, 2:49.**

**Fourth quarter**

- BUF – Josh Allen 2-yard run (Tyler Bass kick), 13:12. Bills 21–14. **Drive: 9 plays, 45 yards, 4:51.**
- NE – Cam Newton 2-yard run (Nick Folk kick), 9:36. Tied 21–21. **Drive: 7 plays, 72 yards, 3:36.**
- BUF – Tyler Bass 28-yard field goal, 4:06. Bills 24–21. **Drive: 10 plays, 63 yards, 5:30.**

**Top passers**

- NE – Cam Newton – 15/25, 174 yards
- BUF – Josh Allen – 11/18, 154 yards, INT

**Top rushers**

- NE – Damien Harris – 16 rushes, 102 yards, TD
- BUF – Devin Singletary – 14 rushes, 86 yards

**Top receivers**

- NE – Jakobi Meyers – 6 receptions, 58 yards
- BUF – Stefon Diggs – 6 receptions, 92 yards

In a windy game, both the Bills and Patriots opted for run-heavy offensive attacks, with both teams nearing 200 overall rushing yards apiece, as Bills rookie RB Zack Moss rushed for the first two touchdowns of his career. Played down to the wire, the game was decided when DT Justin Zimmer forced Patriots QB Cam Newton to fumble in the red zone as New England was driving to either tie the game or take the lead on its final drive. With the win, not only did Buffalo improve to 6–2 with a 1.5-game lead over Miami for the division lead, but achieved its first win over the Patriots since 2016 and first at home since 2011. It was also the first career win over the Patriots for both head coach Sean McDermott and QB Josh Allen.

==== Week 9: vs. Seattle Seahawks ====
Week 9: Seattle Seahawks at Buffalo Bills – Game summary

Quarter	1	2	3	4	Total
Seahawks	0	10	10	14	**34**
**Bills**	14	10	3	17	**44**

at Bills Stadium, Orchard Park, New York

- Date: November 8
- Game time: 1:00 p.m. EST
- Game weather: Sunny, 69 °F (21 °C)
- Game attendance: 0
- Referee: Shawn Smith
- TV announcers (Fox): Chris Myers, Brock Huard and Jen Hale
- Recap, Game Book

Game information

**First quarter**

- BUF – Isaiah McKenzie 25-yard pass from Josh Allen (Tyler Bass kick), 13:41. Bills 7–0. **Drive: 3 plays, 45 yards, 1:25.**
- BUF – Tyler Kroft 1-yard pass from Josh Allen (Tyler Bass kick), 7:40. Bills 14–0. **Drive: 10 plays, 85 yards, 5:11.**

**Second quarter**

- BUF – Tyler Bass 44-yard field goal, 11:26. Bills 17–0. **Drive: 11 plays, 54 yards, 5:17.**
- SEA – Russell Wilson 1-yard run (Jason Myers kick), 6:45. Bills 17–7. **Drive: 8 plays, 60 yards, 4:42.**
- BUF – Gabe Davis 4-yard pass from Josh Allen (Tyler Bass kick), 4:07. Bills 24–7. **Drive: 5 plays, 75 yards, 2:37.**
- SEA – Jason Myers 45-yard field goal, 1:12. Bills 24–10. **Drive: 9 plays, 48 yards, 2:56.**

**Third quarter**

- BUF – Tyler Bass 22-yard field goal, 11:58. Bills 27–10. **Drive: 6 plays, 29 yards, 2:47.**
- SEA – DeeJay Dallas 4-yard run (Jason Myers kick), 6:40. Bills 27–17. **Drive: 11 plays, 75 yards, 5:19.**
- SEA – Jason Myers 44-yard field goal, 2:01. Bills 27–20. **Drive: 5 plays, 29 yards, 2:28.**

**Fourth quarter**

- BUF – Zack Moss 1-yard run (Tyler Bass kick), 11:33. Bills 34–20. **Drive: 9 plays, 81 yards, 5:29.**
- BUF – Josh Allen 3-yard run (Tyler Bass kick), 9:44. Bills 41–20. **Drive: 1 play, 3 yards, 0:06.**
- SEA – David Moore 55-yard pass from Russell Wilson (Jason Myers kick), 9:01. Bills 41–27. **Drive: 3 plays, 75 yards, 0:48.**
- BUF – Tyler Bass 31-yard field goal, 4:17. Bills 44–27. **Drive: 4 plays, 6 yards, 2:17.**
- SEA – DK Metcalf 7-yard pass from Russell Wilson (Jason Myers kick), 1:55. Bills 44–34. **Drive: 7 plays, 75 yards, 2:22.**

**Top passers**

- SEA – Russell Wilson – 28/41, 390 yards, 2 TD, 2 INT
- BUF – Josh Allen – 31/38, 415 yards, 3 TD

**Top rushers**

- SEA – DeeJay Dallas – 7 rushes, 31 yards, TD
- BUF – Zack Moss – 9 rushes, 18 yards, TD

**Top receivers**

- SEA – DK Metcalf – 7 receptions, 108 yards, TD
- BUF – Stefon Diggs – 9 receptions, 118 yards

Thanks to a charged performance from Josh Allen, whose grandmother, Patricia, died the previous night, not only did the Bills improve to 7–2 on the season, their strongest record after nine regular season games since 1993, but the team also notched their first victory over the Seahawks since 2008, their first win over a Pete Carroll-coached team since 1999 (when Carroll coached the New England Patriots before being replaced by Bill Belichick the following season) and the most points scored by the Bills in a game since defeating the San Francisco 49ers 45–16 in 2016.

==== Week 10: at Arizona Cardinals ====
Week 10: Buffalo Bills at Arizona Cardinals – Game summary

Quarter	1	2	3	4	Total
Bills	7	9	7	7	**30**
**Cardinals**	3	6	17	6	**32**

at State Farm Stadium, Glendale, Arizona

- Date: November 15
- Game time: 4:05 p.m. EST/2:05 p.m. MST
- Game weather: Sunny, 78 °F (26 °C) (retractable roof open)
- Game attendance: 4,200
- Referee: Craig Wrolstad
- TV announcers (CBS): Ian Eagle, Charles Davis and Evan Washburn
- Recap, Game Book

Game information

**First quarter**

- ARI – Zane Gonzalez 23-yard field goal, 9:53. Cardinals 3–0. **Drive: 13 plays, 75 yards, 5:07.**
- BUF – Josh Allen 12-yard pass from Isaiah McKenzie (Tyler Bass kick), 6:23. Bills 7–3. **Drive: 7 plays, 63 yards, 3:30.**

**Second quarter**

- BUF – Tyler Bass 54-yard field goal, 14:02. Bills 10–3. **Drive: 10 plays, 31 yards, 5:21.**
- ARI – Zane Gonzalez 42-yard field goal, 8:45. Bills 10–6. **Drive: 10 plays, 51 yards, 5:17.**
- BUF – Tyler Bass 55-yard field goal, 5:45. Bills 13–6. **Drive: 8 plays, 33 yards, 3:00.**
- ARI – Zane Gonzalez 21-yard field goal, 1:24. Bills 13–9. **Drive: 16 plays, 72 yards, 4:21.**
- BUF – Tyler Bass 58-yard field goal, 0:00. Bills 16–9. **Drive: 7 plays, 34 yards, 1:24.**

**Third quarter**

- BUF – Cole Beasley 22-yard pass from Josh Allen (Tyler Bass kick), 9:52. Bills 23–9. **Drive: 3 plays, 37 yards, 1:35.**
- ARI – Kyler Murray 1-yard run (Zane Gonzalez kick), 5:44. Bills 23–16. **Drive: 9 plays, 75 yards, 4:08.**
- ARI – Zane Gonzalez 45-yard field goal, 3:05. Bills 23–19. **Drive: 4 plays, 3 yards, 1:30.**
- ARI – Kyler Murray 15-yard run (Zane Gonzalez kick), 0:08. Cardinals 26–23. **Drive: 3 plays, 56 yards, 1:05.**

**Fourth quarter**

- BUF – Stefon Diggs 21-yard pass from Josh Allen (Tyler Bass kick), 0:34. Bills 30–26. **Drive: 12 plays, 78 yards, 3:01.**
- ARI – DeAndre Hopkins 43-yard pass from Kyler Murray (run failed), 0:02. Cardinals 32–30. **Drive: 4 plays, 75 yards, 0:32.**

**Top passers**

- BUF – Josh Allen – 32/49, 284 yards, 2 TD, 2 INT
- ARI – Kyler Murray – 22/32, 245 yards, TD, INT

**Top rushers**

- BUF – Josh Allen – 7 rushes, 38 yards
- ARI – Kenyan Drake – 16 rushes, 100 yards

**Top receivers**

- BUF – Cole Beasley – 11 receptions, 109 yards, TD
- ARI – DeAndre Hopkins – 7 receptions, 127 yards, TD

In a back-and forth game in which the Bills were up 23–9 in the third quarter but then allowed 3 consecutive Cardinals scores, the Bills would go down the field to score with 0:34 remaining on a 21-yard Stefon Diggs touchdown pass from Josh Allen, taking a late 30–26 lead. However, the Cardinals would go down and respond with a score of their own, a 43-yard pass Hail Mary touchdown with Kyler Murray connecting with DeAndre Hopkins with just 0:02 remaining to give the Cardinals the 32–30 win, dropping the Bills to 7–3 heading into the bye week (it would be the team's last loss of the 2020 regular season).

==== Week 12: vs. Los Angeles Chargers ====
Week 12: Los Angeles Chargers at Buffalo Bills – Game summary

Quarter	1	2	3	4	Total
Chargers	6	0	8	3	**17**
**Bills**	7	10	7	3	**27**

at Bills Stadium, Orchard Park, New York

- Date: November 29
- Game time: 1:00 p.m. EST
- Game weather: Sunny, 48 °F (9 °C)
- Game attendance: 0
- Referee: Alex Kemp
- TV announcers (CBS): Greg Gumbel, Rich Gannon and Jay Feely
- Recap, Game Book

Game information

**First quarter**

- BUF – Dawson Knox 2-yard pass from Josh Allen (Tyler Bass kick), 12:56. Bills 7–0. **Drive: 4 plays, 63 yards, 1:59.**
- LAC – Keenan Allen 5-yard pass from Justin Herbert (kick failed), 6:31. Bills 7–6. **Drive: 13 plays, 79 yards, 5:55.**

**Second quarter**

- BUF – Gabe Davis 20-yard pass from Cole Beasley (Tyler Bass kick), 9:44. Bills 14–6. **Drive: 7 plays, 76 yards, 4:21.**
- BUF – Tyler Bass 45-yard field goal, 2:16. Bills 17–6. **Drive: 12 plays, 60 yards, 5:15.**

**Third quarter**

- BUF – Josh Allen 3-yard run (Tyler Bass kick), 9:02. Bills 24–6. **Drive: 12 plays, 57 yards, 5:58.**
- LAC – Joshua Kelley 1-yard run (Justin Herbert-Keenan Allen pass), 4:51. Bills 24–14. **Drive: 10 plays, 67 yards, 4:11.**

**Fourth quarter**

- LAC – Michael Badgley 27-yard field goal, 10:16. Bills 24–17. **Drive: 7 plays, 36 yards, 3:50.**
- BUF – Tyler Bass 43-yard field goal, 3:26. Bills 27–17. **Drive: 6 plays, 40 yards, 1:51.**

**Top passers**

- LAC – Justin Herbert – 31/52, 316 yards, TD, INT
- BUF – Josh Allen – 18/24, 157 yards, TD, INT

**Top rushers**

- LAC – Austin Ekeler – 14 rushes, 44 yards
- BUF – Devin Singletary – 11 rushes, 82 yards

**Top receivers**

- LAC – Austin Ekeler – 11 receptions, 85 yards
- BUF – Gabe Davis – 3 receptions, 79 yards, TD

Despite suffering three turnovers (each in the fourth quarter) and a knee injury Josh Allen sustained in the second quarter, the Bills held on to win, stifling rookie QB Justin Herbert and the Chargers' offense for much of the game. With the win, Buffalo improved to 8–3 and handed Los Angeles its first loss by more than a touchdown of the season. This was also the Bills' first win over the Chargers since 2008 and their first win over the Chargers as a Los Angeles-based team since 1960, in addition to being the first Bills–Chargers matchup since 2002 without QB Philip Rivers on the Chargers' roster (Rivers joined the Indianapolis Colts roster in the offseason).

==== Week 13: at San Francisco 49ers ====
Week 13: Buffalo Bills at San Francisco 49ers – Game summary

Quarter	1	2	3	4	Total
**Bills**	0	17	10	7	**34**
49ers	7	0	10	7	**24**

at State Farm Stadium, Glendale, Arizona

- Date: December 7
- Game time: 8:15 p.m. EST/6:15 p.m. MST
- Game weather: None (retractable roof closed)
- Game attendance: 0
- Referee: Tony Corrente
- TV announcers (ESPN/ABC): Steve Levy, Brian Griese, Louis Riddick, Lisa Salters and John Parry
- Recap, Game Book

Game information

**First quarter**

- SF – Brandon Aiyuk 2-yard pass from Nick Mullens (Robbie Gould kick), 0:44. 49ers 7–0. **Drive: 3 plays, 3 yards, 0:40.**

**Second quarter**

- BUF – Cole Beasley 5-yard pass from Josh Allen (Tyler Bass kick), 13:02. Tied 7–7. **Drive: 5 plays, 77 yards, 2:42.**
- BUF – Dawson Knox 4-yard pass from Josh Allen (Tyler Bass kick), 2:41. Bills 14–7. **Drive: 14 plays, 69 yards, 7:49.**
- BUF – Tyler Bass 37-yard field goal, 0:00. Bills 17–7. **Drive: 7 plays, 71 yards, 1:05.**

**Third quarter**

- SF – Robbie Gould 45-yard field goal, 11:14. Bills 17–10. **Drive: 8 plays, 48 yards, 3:46.**
- BUF – Isaiah McKenzie 23-yard pass from Josh Allen (Tyler Bass kick), 5:48. Bills 24–10. **Drive: 11 plays, 75 yards, 5:26.**
- BUF – Tyler Bass 28-yard field goal, 3:12. Bills 27–10. **Drive: 4 plays, -4 yards, 2:16.**
- SF – Kyle Juszczyk 6-yard pass from Nick Mullens (Robbie Gould kick), 0:26. Bills 27–17. **Drive: 5 plays, 75 yards, 2:43.**

**Fourth quarter**

- BUF – Gabe Davis 28-yard pass from Josh Allen (Tyler Bass kick), 9:50. Bills 34–17. **Drive: 10 plays, 75 yards, 5:36.**
- SF – Jordan Reed 5-yard pass from Nick Mullens (Robbie Gould kick), 0:43. Bills 34–24. **Drive: 13 plays, 73 yards, 2:47.**

**Top passers**

- BUF – Josh Allen – 32/40, 375 yards, 4 TD
- SF – Nick Mullens – 26/39, 316 yards, 3 TD, 2 INT

**Top rushers**

- BUF – Devin Singletary – 18 rushes, 61 yards
- SF – Jeff Wilson – 7 rushes, 47 yards

**Top receivers**

- BUF – Cole Beasley – 9 receptions, 130 yards, TD
- SF – Brandon Aiyuk – 5 receptions, 95 yards, TD

This game was played at State Farm Stadium in Glendale, Arizona instead of the 49ers' home stadium, Levi's Stadium in Santa Clara, California, due to COVID-19 cases in Santa Clara County, California. In the Bills' return to the site of the Hail Murray play three weeks earlier, Josh Allen and Cole Beasley led the offense in an effective showing, while the defense kept a stout 49ers rushing offense in check for the most part with linebacker Matt Milano returning from injured reserve. With the win, not only did Buffalo improve to 9–3, but the team also earned its first win on Monday Night Football since 1999. (Note: In 2014, the Bills' Week 12 matchup against the New York Jets, which was played in Detroit's Ford Field due to weather conditions and won by Buffalo 38–3, was postponed to Monday, November 24, but was not a prime time game.) The team also clinched its second winning season in a row, the first time since 1998-1999. The win over their final NFC West opponent also meant that the Hail Murray play cost the Bills a season sweep of the NFC West.

==== Week 14: vs. Pittsburgh Steelers ====
Week 14: Pittsburgh Steelers at Buffalo Bills – Game summary

Quarter	1	2	3	4	Total
Steelers	0	7	0	8	**15**
**Bills**	0	9	14	3	**26**

at Bills Stadium, Orchard Park, New York

- Date: December 13
- Game time: 8:20 p.m. EST
- Game weather: Cloudy with snow flurries, 35 °F (2 °C)
- Game attendance: 0
- Referee: Shawn Smith
- TV announcers (NBC): Mike Tirico, Cris Collinsworth, Kathryn Tappen, and Terry McAulay
- Recap, Game Book

Game information

**First quarter**

- No scoring plays.

**Second quarter**

- PIT – James Washington 19-yard pass from Ben Roethlisberger (Chris Boswell kick), 8:21. Steelers 7–0. **Drive: 3 plays, 30 yards, 1:15.**
- BUF – Tyler Bass 34-yard field goal, 1:42. Steelers 7–3. **Drive: 9 plays, 58 yards, 3:14.**
- BUF – Taron Johnson 51-yard interception return (kick failed), 0:52. Bills 9–7.

**Third quarter**

- BUF – Stefon Diggs 19-yard pass from Josh Allen (Tyler Bass kick), 10:23. Bills 16–7. **Drive: 8 plays, 68 yards, 4:37.**
- BUF – Gabe Davis 13-yard pass from Josh Allen (Tyler Bass kick), 7:02. Bills 23–7. **Drive: 4 plays, 57 yards, 2:05.**

**Fourth quarter**

- PIT – JuJu Smith-Schuster 3-yard pass from Ben Roethlisberger (Ben Roethlisberger–Eric Ebron pass), 12:18. Bills 23–15. **Drive: 10 plays, 81 yards, 4:38.**
- BUF – Tyler Bass 23-yard field goal, 8:07. Bills 26–15. **Drive: 11 plays, 61 yards, 4:11.**

**Top passers**

- PIT – Ben Roethlisberger – 21/37, 187 yards, 2 TD, 2 INT
- BUF – Josh Allen – 24/43, 238 yards, 2 TD, INT

**Top rushers**

- PIT – James Conner – 10 rushes, 18 yards
- BUF – Zack Moss – 13 rushes, 43 yards

**Top receivers**

- PIT – JuJu Smith-Schuster – 6 receptions, 55 yards, TD
- BUF – Stefon Diggs – 10 receptions, 130 yards, TD

"Let them do all the talking, all the (expletive) dancing. We (expletive) work."

— Josh Allen's pre-game speech regarding Steelers WR JuJu Smith-Schuster's antics

The Sunday Night Football matchup was a repeat from Week 15 of the 2019 season, when the Bills traveled to Pittsburgh and won 17–10 to clinch a playoff berth. This time around, Buffalo hosted the Steelers, and once again got their tenth win of the season to start 10–3 for the first time since 1991. After a scoreless first quarter, Pittsburgh scored first with Ben Roethlisberger completing a 19-yard TD pass to James Washington in the second quarter. The Bills then scored on a field goal drive and a 51-yard pick six of Roethlisberger by Taron Johnson to go up 9–7 at halftime, a lead they would never relinquish. The Bills added two third-quarter touchdowns from Allen to Diggs and Gabe Davis respectively to prevail, 26–15. With the win, not only did the Bills match their win total from the previous season and defeat the Steelers at home for the first time since 1999, but Josh Allen also passed Jim Kelly for most total touchdowns in a single season in team history, while Stefon Diggs tied Eric Moulds' record of 100 receptions in a single season.

==== Week 15: at Denver Broncos ====
Week 15: Buffalo Bills at Denver Broncos – Game summary

Quarter	1	2	3	4	Total
**Bills**	7	14	17	10	**48**
Broncos	0	13	0	6	**19**

at Empower Field at Mile High, Denver, Colorado

- Date: December 19
- Game time: 4:30 p.m. EST/2:30 p.m. MST
- Game weather: 47 °F (8 °C), mostly sunny
- Game attendance: 0
- Referee: Clete Blakeman
- TV announcers (NFLN): Adam Amin, Mark Schlereth and Lindsay Czarniak
- Recap, Game Book

Game information

**First quarter**

- BUF – Dawson Knox 9-yard pass from Josh Allen (Tyler Bass kick), 4:05. Bills 7–0. **Drive: 13 plays, 59 yards, 6:05.**

**Second quarter**

- BUF – Josh Allen 24-yard run (Tyler Bass kick), 10:30. Bills 14–0. **Drive: 11 plays, 95 yards, 5:09.**
- DEN – Melvin Gordon 10-yard run (Taylor Russolino kick), 6:28. Bills 14–7. **Drive: 6 plays, 35 yards, 3:01.**
- BUF – Jake Kumerow 22-yard pass from Josh Allen (Tyler Bass kick), 1:49. Bills 21–7. **Drive: 5 plays, 59 yards, 2:26.**
- DEN – Noah Fant 6-yard pass from Drew Lock (kick failed), 0:05. Bills 21–13. **Drive: 9 plays, 75 yards, 1:44.**

**Third quarter**

- BUF – Josh Allen 1-yard run (Tyler Bass kick), 10:58. Bills 28–13. **Drive: 7 plays, 43 yards, 4:02.**
- BUF – Jerry Hughes 21-yard fumble return (Tyler Bass kick), 10:41. Bills 35–13.
- BUF – Tyler Bass 27-yard field goal, 0:44. Bills 38–13. **Drive: 10 plays, 49 yards, 4:48.**

**Fourth quarter**

- BUF – Tyler Bass 27-yard field goal, 5:46. Bills 41–13. **Drive: 12 plays, 86 yards, 7:46.**
- DEN – Melvin Gordon 8-yard run (kick failed), 1:52. Bills 41–19. **Drive: 12 plays, 75 yards, 3:54.**
- BUF – Devin Singletary 51-yard run (Tyler Bass kick), 1:44. Bills 48–19. **Drive: 1 play, 51 yards, 0:12.**

**Top passers**

- BUF – Josh Allen – 28/40, 359 yards, 2 TD
- DEN – Drew Lock – 20/32, 132 yards, TD

**Top rushers**

- BUF – Zack Moss – 13 rushes, 81 yards
- DEN – Melvin Gordon – 11 rushes, 61 yards, 2 TD

**Top receivers**

- BUF – Stefon Diggs – 11 receptions, 147 yards
- DEN – Noah Fant – 8 receptions, 68 yards, TD

A 48–19 blowout victory in Denver was the Bills' fourth straight double-digit win, and their first win by more than two scores since Week 12 of 2019 (incidentally also against the Broncos). Their 48 points scored was the greatest number of points scored by the Bills since scoring 49 against the Bengals in Week 11 of 2010. It was also their first road win over the Broncos since 2008. With the dominant win, the Bills not only clinched their third playoff berth in four seasons after having previously missed the playoffs for 17 consecutive seasons, but also won the AFC East division for the first time since 1995. Josh Allen joined Drew Bledsoe in 2002 as the only quarterbacks in franchise history to surpass 4,000 passing yards in a season.

==== Week 16: at New England Patriots ====
Week 16: Buffalo Bills at New England Patriots – Game summary

Quarter	1	2	3	4	Total
**Bills**	3	21	7	7	**38**
Patriots	3	6	0	0	**9**

at Gillette Stadium, Foxborough, Massachusetts

- Date: December 28
- Game time: 8:15 p.m. EST
- Game weather: Clear, 41 °F (5 °C)
- Game attendance: 0
- Referee: Ronald Torbert
- TV announcers (ESPN/ABC): Steve Levy, Brian Griese, Louis Riddick, Laura Rutledge and John Parry
- Recap, Game Book

Game information

**First quarter**

- NE – Nick Folk 45-yard field goal, 12:44. Patriots 3–0. **Drive: 6 plays, 38 yards, 2:16.**
- BUF – Tyler Bass 22-yard field goal, 6:43. Tied 3–3. **Drive: 10 plays, 49 yards, 6:01.**

**Second quarter**

- BUF – Zack Moss 5-yard run (Tyler Bass kick), 14:50. Bills 10–3. **Drive: 12 plays, 70 yards, 5:28.**
- NE – Cam Newton 9-yard run (kick failed), 10:39. Bills 10–9. **Drive: 9 plays, 90 yards, 4:11.**
- BUF – Lee Smith 4-yard pass from Josh Allen (Tyler Bass kick), 5:32. Bills 17–9. **Drive: 10 plays, 75 yards, 5:07.**
- BUF – Stefon Diggs 50-yard pass from Josh Allen (Tyler Bass kick), 3:55. Bills 24–9. **Drive: 3 plays, 67 yards, 0:47.**

**Third quarter**

- BUF – Stefon Diggs 18-yard pass from Josh Allen (Tyler Bass kick), 11:28. Bills 31–9. **Drive: 8 plays, 75 yards, 3:32.**

**Fourth quarter**

- BUF – Stefon Diggs 8-yard pass from Josh Allen (Tyler Bass kick), 13:16. Bills 38–9. **Drive: 10 plays, 95 yards, 7:25.**

**Top passers**

- BUF – Josh Allen – 27/36, 320 yards, 4 TD
- NE – Jarrett Stidham – 4/11, 44 yards

**Top rushers**

- BUF – Zack Moss – 12 rushes, 57 yards, TD
- NE – Sony Michel – 10 rushes, 69 yards

**Top receivers**

- BUF – Stefon Diggs – 9 receptions, 145 yards, 3 TD
- NE – Jakobi Meyers – 4 receptions, 45 yards

After a close first quarter, in which the Bills were leading 10–9 following a 9-yard Cam Newton touchdown run, the Bills offense scored 28 unanswered points en route to a 38–9 blowout victory on the final Monday Night Football game of the season, sweeping the Patriots for the first time since 1999 and clinching their first 12-win season since 1993. The win extended the Bills' streak of double-digit wins to five games. Josh Allen passed Jim Kelly's franchise record for most passing touchdowns in a single season with 34, while Stefon Diggs surpassed Eric Moulds for the franchise single-season receiving yards record.

==== Week 17: vs. Miami Dolphins ====
Week 17: Miami Dolphins at Buffalo Bills – Game summary

Quarter	1	2	3	4	Total
Dolphins	3	3	7	13	**26**
**Bills**	0	28	7	21	**56**

at Bills Stadium, Orchard Park, New York

- Date: January 3, 2021
- Game time: 1:00 p.m. EST
- Game weather: Cloudy, 35 °F (2 °C)
- Game attendance: 0
- Referee: Bill Vinovich
- TV announcers (CBS): Kevin Harlan, Trent Green and A.J. Ross
- Recap, Game Book

Game information

**First quarter**

- MIA – Jason Sanders 49-yard field goal, 8:07. Dolphins 3–0. **Drive: 6 plays, 10 yards, 2:35.**

**Second quarter**

- BUF – Isaiah McKenzie 7-yard pass from Josh Allen (Tyler Bass kick), 12:09. Bills 7–3. **Drive: 7 plays, 50 yards, 3:19.**
- BUF – Isaiah McKenzie 14-yard pass from Josh Allen (Tyler Bass kick), 6:56. Bills 14–3. **Drive: 8 plays, 88 yards, 2:47.**
- BUF – Isaiah McKenzie 84-yard punt return (Tyler Bass kick), 5:22. Bills 21–3.
- MIA – Jason Sanders 32-yard field goal, 1:44. Bills 21–6. **Drive: 9 plays, 61 yards, 3:38.**
- BUF – John Brown 32-yard pass from Josh Allen (Tyler Bass kick), 1:00. Bills 28–6. **Drive: 4 plays, 75 yards, 0:44.**

**Third quarter**

- MIA – Myles Gaskin 1-yard run (Jason Sanders kick), 11:08. Bills 28–13. **Drive: 9 plays, 75 yards, 3:52.**
- BUF – Josh Norman 16-yard interception return (Tyler Bass kick), 8:20. Bills 35–13.

**Fourth quarter**

- BUF – Antonio Williams 18-yard run (Tyler Bass kick), 13:44. Bills 42–13. **Drive: 5 plays, 79 yards, 2:45.**
- BUF – Antonio Williams 2-yard run (Tyler Bass kick), 11:55. Bills 49–13. **Drive: 3 plays, 25 yards, 1:37.**
- MIA – Salvon Ahmed 16-yard run (pass failed), 8:40. Bills 49–19. **Drive: 9 plays, 75 yards, 3:15.**
- BUF – Gabe Davis 56-yard pass from Matt Barkley (Tyler Bass kick), 6:18. Bills 56–19. **Drive: 1 play, 56 yards, 0:09.**
- MIA – Malcolm Perry 25-yard pass from Tua Tagovailoa (Jason Sanders kick), 2:47. Bills 56–26. **Drive: 8 plays, 75 yards, 3:31.**

**Top passers**

- MIA – Tua Tagovailoa – 35/58, 361 yards, TD, 3 INT
- BUF – Josh Allen – 18/25, 224 yards, 3 TD, INT

**Top rushers**

- MIA – Salvon Ahmed – 6 rushes, 29 yards, TD
- BUF – Antonio Williams – 12 rushes, 63 yards, 2 TD

**Top receivers**

- MIA – DeVante Parker – 7 receptions, 116 yards
- BUF – Gabe Davis – 2 receptions, 107 yards, TD

In a rematch from Week 2, the Bills closed out the regular season hosting the Dolphins, who needed a win to make the playoffs. The Dolphins were forced to start rookie QB Tua Tagovailoa, as Ryan Fitzpatrick tested positive for COVID-19. Unfortunately for the Dolphins, Tagovailoa had his worst performance of the season, as he had three interceptions (one of which was returned for a TD by Bills CB Josh Norman), despite passing for a career-high 361 yards. QB Josh Allen threw for 224 yards, three TDs and a first quarter interception, with two of those TDs going to WR Isaiah McKenzie, who also returned a punt 84 yards for a TD in the second quarter. Despite Allen being replaced in the second half by Matt Barkley, the Bills continued their dominating performance of the previous five weeks. They extended their streak of double-digit wins to six games by scoring a season-high 56 points, the second-most points in a single game in franchise history (they scored 58 against the Dolphins in 1966).

Despite only playing for one half, Josh Allen still broke the single season record for most passing yards by a QB in franchise history. Meanwhile, Stefon Diggs became the first wide receiver in NFL history to lead the league in both receptions and receiving yards in his first season with a new team. With the 56–26 victory, the Bills finished 13–3 for the franchise's best season since 1991, swept all three divisional opponents for a 6–0 record within the division for the first time in franchise history, and clinched the #2 seed in the playoffs (although they would not get a first-round bye because of the expanded playoff format).

=== Standings ===
==== Division ====
AFC East
	W	L	T	PCT	DIV	CONF	PF	PA	STK
^{(2)} Buffalo Bills	13	3	0	.813	6–0	10–2	501	375	W6
Miami Dolphins	10	6	0	.625	3–3	7–5	404	338	L1
New England Patriots	7	9	0	.438	3–3	6–6	326	353	W1
New York Jets	2	14	0	.125	0–6	1–11	243	457	L1

==== Conference ====
AFC
#	Team	Division	W	L	T	PCT	DIV	CONF	SOS	SOV	STK
**Division leaders**
1	Kansas City Chiefs	West	14	2	0	.875	4–2	10–2	.465	.464	L1
2	Buffalo Bills	East	13	3	0	.813	6–0	10–2	.512	.471	W6
3	Pittsburgh Steelers	North	12	4	0	.750	4–2	9–3	.475	.448	L1
4 (Note: Tennessee finished ahead of Indianapolis in the AFC South based on division record.)	Tennessee Titans	South	11	5	0	.688	5–1	8–4	.475	.398	W1
**Wild cards**
5 (Note: Baltimore claimed the No. 5 seed over Indianapolis based on head-to-head victory. Division tiebreaker used to eliminate Cleveland (see below).) (Note: Baltimore claimed the No. 5 seed over Cleveland based on head-to-head sweep.)	Baltimore Ravens	North	11	5	0	.688	4–2	7–5	.494	.401	W5
6 (Note: Cleveland claimed the No. 6 seed over Indianapolis based on head-to-head victory.)	Cleveland Browns	North	11	5	0	.688	3–3	7–5	.451	.406	W1
7	Indianapolis Colts	South	11	5	0	.688	4–2	7–5	.443	.384	W1
**Did not qualify for the postseason**
8	Miami Dolphins	East	10	6	0	.625	3–3	7–5	.467	.347	L1
9	Las Vegas Raiders	West	8	8	0	.500	4–2	6–6	.539	.477	W1
10 (Note: New England finished ahead of the LA Chargers based on head-to-head victory.)	New England Patriots	East	7	9	0	.438	3–3	6–6	.527	.429	W1
11	Los Angeles Chargers	West	7	9	0	.438	3–3	6–6	.482	.344	W4
12	Denver Broncos	West	5	11	0	.313	1–5	4–8	.566	.388	L3
13	Cincinnati Bengals	North	4	11	1	.281	1–5	4–8	.529	.438	L1
14	Houston Texans	South	4	12	0	.250	2–4	3–9	.541	.219	L5
15	New York Jets	East	2	14	0	.125	0–6	1–11	.594	.656	L1
16	Jacksonville Jaguars	South	1	15	0	.063	1–5	1–11	.549	.688	L15
**Tiebreakers** (Note: When breaking ties for three or more teams under the NFL's rules, they are first broken within divisions, then comparing only the highest ranked remaining team from each division.)

== Postseason ==
=== Schedule ===
Round	Date	Opponent (seed)	Result	Record	Venue	Recap
Wild Card	January 9, 2021	Indianapolis Colts (7)	W 27–24	1–0	Bills Stadium	Recap
Divisional	January 16, 2021	Baltimore Ravens (5)	W 17–3	2–0	Bills Stadium	Recap
AFC Championship	January 24, 2021	at Kansas City Chiefs (1)	L 24–38	2–1	Arrowhead Stadium	Recap

=== Game summaries ===
==== AFC Wild Card Playoffs: vs. (7) Indianapolis Colts ====
AFC Wild Card Playoffs: (7) Indianapolis Colts at (2) Buffalo Bills – Game summary

Quarter	1	2	3	4	Total
Colts	3	7	0	14	24
Bills	7	7	3	10	27

at Bills Stadium, Orchard Park, New York

- Date: January 9, 2021
- Game time: 1:05 p.m. EST
- Game weather: Sunny, 34 °F (1 °C)
- Game attendance: 6,772
- Referee: Brad Allen
- TV announcers (CBS): Ian Eagle, Charles Davis and Evan Washburn
- Recap, Game Book

Game information

First quarter

- IND – Rodrigo Blankenship 30-yard field goal, 5:29. Colts 3–0. Drive: 8 plays, 52 yards, 3:39.
- BUF – Dawson Knox 3-yard pass from Josh Allen (Tyler Bass kick), 1:49. Bills 7–3. Drive: 8 plays, 85 yards, 3:40.

Second quarter

- IND – Jonathan Taylor 1-yard run (Rodrigo Blankenship kick), 8:07. Colts 10-7. Drive: 9 plays, 65 yards, 5:27.
- BUF – Josh Allen 5-yard run (Tyler Bass kick), 0:14. Bills 14–10. Drive: 10 plays, 96 yards, 1:32.

Third quarter

- BUF – Tyler Bass 46-yards field goal, 11:05. Bills 17–10. Drive: 9 plays, 44 yards, 3:44.

Fourth quarter

- BUF – Stefon Diggs 35-yard pass from Josh Allen (Tyler Bass kick), 14:10. Bills 24–10. Drive: 9 plays, 77 yards, 4:22.
- IND – Zach Pascal 9-yard pass from Philip Rivers (pass failed), 11:32. Bills 24–16. Drive: 7 plays, 75 yards, 2:38.
- BUF – Tyler Bass 54-yard field goal, 8:08. Bills 27–16. Drive: 7 plays, 39 yards, 3:24.
- IND – Jack Doyle 27-yard pass from Philip Rivers (Philip Rivers-Jack Doyle pass), 6:13. Bills 27–24. Drive: 5 plays, 76 yards, 1:55.

Top passers

- IND – Philip Rivers – 27/46, 309 yards, 2 TD
- BUF – Josh Allen – 26/35, 324 yards, 2 TD

Top rushers

- IND – Jonathan Taylor – 21 rushes, 78 yards, TD
- BUF – Josh Allen – 11 rushes, 54 yards, TD

Top receivers

- IND – Michael Pittman Jr. – 5 receptions, 90 yards
- BUF – Stefon Diggs – 6 receptions, 128 yards, TD

In their fourth consecutive playoff game against the AFC South dating back to 1999, and what would end up being Colts quarterback Philip Rivers' final NFL game until a brief stint in the 2025 season, the Bills held on despite a fourth quarter comeback by the Colts to win their first playoff game since 1995. In his first playoff win, Josh Allen threw for 2 touchdowns and 324 passing yards, and scored another rushing touchdown. Dawson Knox and Stefon Diggs caught a touchdown each. Tyler Bass kicked a 54-yard field goal, a new rookie playoff record. Allen became the first QB in NFL history to throw for 300+ yards, run for 50+ yards and complete at least 70% of his passes in a playoff game. The game was also coach Sean McDermott's first playoff win as head coach.

==== AFC Divisional Playoffs: vs. (5) Baltimore Ravens ====
AFC Divisional Playoffs: (5) Baltimore Ravens at (2) Buffalo Bills – Game summary

Quarter	1	2	3	4	Total
Ravens	0	3	0	0	3
Bills	3	0	14	0	17

at Bills Stadium, Orchard Park, New York

- Date: January 16, 2021
- Game time: 8:15 p.m. EST
- Game weather: Mostly cloudy, 34 °F (1 °C)
- Game attendance: 6,772
- Referee: Carl Cheffers
- TV announcers (NBC): Al Michaels, Cris Collinsworth and Michele Tafoya
- Recap, Game Book

Game information

First quarter

- BUF – Tyler Bass 28-yard field goal, 2:57. Bills 3–0. Drive: 5 plays, 28 yards, 1:47.

Second quarter

- BAL – Justin Tucker 34-yard field goal, 0:04. Tied 3–3. Drive: 8 plays, 57 yards, 0:59.

Third quarter

- BUF – Stefon Diggs 3-yard pass from Josh Allen (Tyler Bass kick), 2:29. Bills 10–3. Drive: 11 plays, 66 yards, 5:31.
- BUF – Taron Johnson 101-yard interception return (Tyler Bass kick), 0:41. Bills 17–3.

Fourth quarter

- No scoring plays.

Top passers

- BAL – Lamar Jackson – 14/24, 162 yards, INT
- BUF – Josh Allen – 23/37, 206 yards, TD

Top rushers

- BAL – J. K. Dobbins, Gus Edwards – 10 rushes, 42 yards
- BUF – Devin Singletary – 7 rushes, 25 yards

Top receivers

- BAL – Marquise Brown – 4 receptions, 87 yards
- BUF – Stefon Diggs – 8 receptions, 106 yards, TD

After four consecutive playoff games against the AFC South dating back to Music City Miracle in 1999, the Bills finally played a team from another division in the playoffs for the first time since 1998. In a windy game which saw three missed field goals in the first half alone (two by the league's best kicker in Justin Tucker and one by Bills rookie Tyler Bass), the Bills scored the first touchdown of the game in the third quarter on a three-yard pass from Josh Allen to Stefon Diggs to take a 10–3 lead. The Ravens then drove to the Bills' 9 yard line, where quarterback Lamar Jackson threw the first end-zone interception of his career to Bills cornerback Taron Johnson, which was returned 101 yards for a touchdown, tied for the longest pick-six in NFL playoff history, to expand the Bills' lead to 17–3. Jackson then suffered an injury on the next series, and was unable to return. Although the Bills offense was held scoreless for the rest of the game, Ravens backup quarterback Tyler Huntley was unable to complete a comeback, sealing the 17–3 win for the Bills to advance to their first AFC Championship since 1993.

==== AFC Championship: at (1) Kansas City Chiefs ====
AFC Championship: (2) Buffalo Bills at (1) Kansas City Chiefs – Game summary

Quarter	1	2	3	4	Total
Bills	9	3	3	9	24
Chiefs	0	21	10	7	38

at Arrowhead Stadium, Kansas City, Missouri

- Date: January 24, 2021
- Game time: 6:40 p.m. EST/5:40 p.m. CST
- Game weather: Cloudy, 40 °F (4 °C)
- Game attendance: 16,993
- Referee: Bill Vinovich
- TV announcers (CBS): Jim Nantz, Tony Romo, Tracy Wolfson, Evan Washburn and Jay Feely
- Recap, Game Book

Game information

First quarter

- BUF – Tyler Bass 51-yard field goal, 11:32. Bills 3–0. Drive: 10 plays, 42 yards, 3:28.
- BUF – Dawson Knox 3-yard pass from Josh Allen (kick failed), 6:14. Bills 9–0. Drive: 1 play, 3 yards, 0:05.

Second quarter

- KC – Mecole Hardman 3-yard pass from Patrick Mahomes (Harrison Butker kick), 14:16. Bills 9–7. Drive: 14 plays, 80 yards, 6:58.
- KC – Darrel Williams 6-yard run (Harrison Butker kick), 9:35. Chiefs 14–9. Drive: 5 plays, 82 yards, 2:51.
- KC – Clyde Edwards-Helaire 1-yard run (Harrison Butker kick), 4:12. Chiefs 21–9. Drive: 9 plays, 77 yards, 4:19.
- BUF – Tyler Bass 20-yard field goal, 0:14. Chiefs 21–12. Drive: 12 plays, 73 yards, 3:58.

Third quarter

- KC – Harrison Butker 45-yard field goal, 10:53. Chiefs 24–12. Drive: 10 plays, 48 yards, 4:07.
- BUF – Tyler Bass 27-yard field goal, 5:52. Chiefs 24–15. Drive: 11 plays, 67 yards, 4:56.
- KC – Travis Kelce 1-yard pass from Patrick Mahomes (Harrison Butker kick), 3:29. Chiefs 31–15. Drive: 5 plays, 73 yards, 2:20.

Fourth quarter

- KC – Travis Kelce 5-yard pass from Patrick Mahomes (Harrison Butker kick), 7:36. Chiefs 38–15. Drive: 11 plays, 58 yards, 5:35.
- BUF – Isaiah McKenzie 6-yard pass from Josh Allen (pass failed), 4:08. Chiefs 38–21. Drive: 10 plays, 73 yards, 3:28.
- BUF – Tyler Bass 51-yard field goal, 3:19. Chiefs 38–24. Drive: 5 plays, 34 yards, 0:49.

Top passers

- BUF – Josh Allen – 28/48, 287 yards, 2 TDs, INT
- KC – Patrick Mahomes – 29/38, 325 yards, 3 TDs

Top rushers

- BUF – Josh Allen – 7 rushes, 88 yards
- KC – Darrel Williams – 13 rushes, 52 yards, TD

Top receivers

- BUF – Cole Beasley – 7 receptions, 88 yards
- KC – Tyreek Hill – 9 receptions, 172 yards

This was the third AFL/AFC championship game between the two teams. Kansas City won the 1966 AFL Championship game to advance to Super Bowl I, while Buffalo bested the Chiefs in the 1993 AFC Championship game to advance to Super Bowl XXVIII, its fourth in a row. Despite taking a 9–0 lead in the first quarter, the Bills offense was ineffective in the red zone, and on defense, they were unable to contain the Chiefs offense for the remainder of the game. After giving up three consecutive touchdowns in the second quarter, the Bills scored a field goal to go into halftime down 12–21. The Chiefs momentum continued into the second half with two more scoring drives, while the Bills settled for another field goal. In the fourth quarter, Allen's pass intended for receiver John Brown was tipped and intercepted, leading to the Chiefs' final touchdown of the night. The Bills followed up with a scoring drive on a Josh Allen touchdown pass to Isaiah McKenzie, followed by an unsuccessful two-point attempt, and a successful onside kick recovery leading to a field goal. The Chiefs recovered the Bills' next onside kick and were able to drive to the Bills' 15-yard line and run out the clock, ending the Bills' hopes for a comeback victory.

== Accolades ==
- Josh Allen: 4x AFC Offensive Player of the Week; 2x AFC Offensive Player of the Month
- Stefon Diggs: 1x AFC Offensive Player of the Week
- Jerry Hughes: 1x AFC Defensive Player of the Week
- A. J. Klein: 1x AFC Defensive Player of the Week
- Pro Bowlers:
  - QB Josh Allen
  - WR Stefon Diggs
  - LB Tremaine Edmunds
  - CB Tre'Davious White
  - RS Andre Roberts
- All-Pro:
  - WR Stefon Diggs (1st team)
  - QB Josh Allen (2nd team)
  - WR Cole Beasley (2nd team)
  - CB Tre'Davious White (2nd team)
  - RS Andre Roberts (2nd team)
