= Antonio Williams (running back) =

American football player (born 1997)

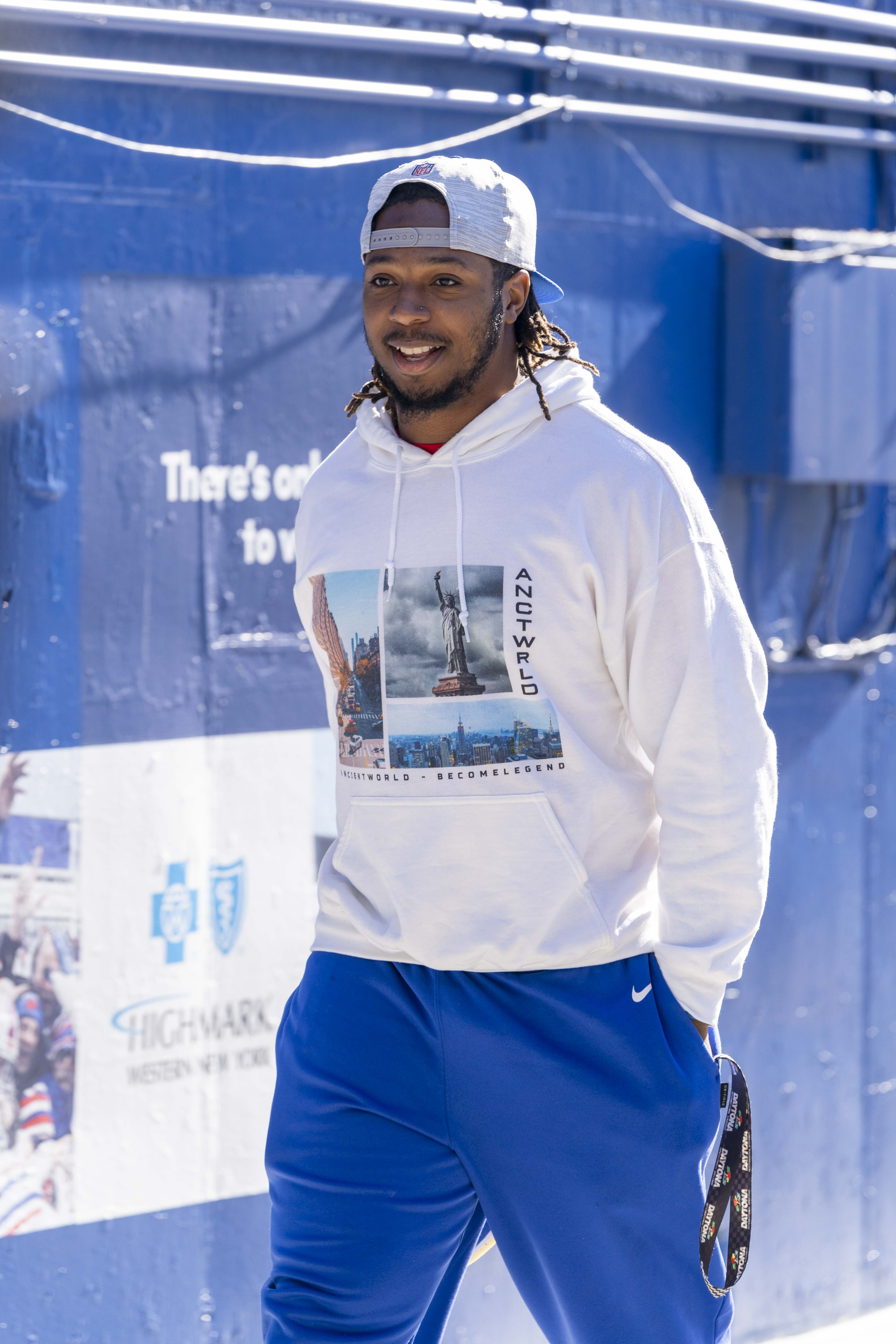
- Williams in 2021

Sam Houston Bearkats
- Title: Running backs coach

Personal information
- Born: October 22, 1997 (age 29); New London, North Carolina, U.S.
- Listed height: 5 ft 11 in (1.80 m)
- Listed weight: 215 lb (98 kg)

Career information
- High school: North Stanly (New London, North Carolina)
- College: Ohio State (2016–2017); North Carolina (2018–2019)
- NFL draft: 2020: undrafted

Career history

Playing
- Buffalo Bills (2020–2021); New York Giants (2022); BC Lions (2023)

Coaching
- Sam Houston (2025—present) Running backs coach

Career NFL statistics
- Rushing yards: 63
- Rushing average: 5.3
- Rushing touchdowns: 2
- Receptions: 1
- Receiving yards: 20
- Stats at Pro Football Reference

Antonio Williams (born October 22, 1997) is an American college football coach and former professional football running back. He is currently the running backs coach for the Sam Houston Bearkats. Williams played college football for the Ohio State Buckeyes and North Carolina.

== College career ==
Williams began his collegiate career at Ohio State. He spent two seasons with the Buckeyes and rushed for 290 yards and three touchdowns as a sophomore while serving as the team's third running back behind J. K. Dobbins and Mike Weber. Williams announced that he would be transferring to North Carolina in the spring of his sophomore year.

Following his transfer, Williams was granted a hardship waiver from the NCAA and was not required to sit out his junior season. He started seven games in his first season with the Tar Heels and finished as the team's second-leading rusher with 504 yards and five touchdowns. As a senior, Williams split carries with Michael Carter and Javonte Williams and rushed for 322 yards and three touchdowns on 48 carries.

== Professional career ==
Pre-draft measurables
Height	Weight
5 ft 9 3/4 in (1.77 m)	215 lb (98 kg)
Values from Pro Day

=== Buffalo Bills ===
Williams was signed by the Buffalo Bills as an undrafted free agent on May 8, 2020. He was waived by the Bills on August 5, but re-signed on August 30, 2020. Williams was waived during final roster cuts and was signed to the team's practice squad on September 6 before again being released. Williams was again re-signed to the practice squad on September 23, 2020, and released on October 3 only to return to the unit on October 8. He was elevated to the active roster on January 2, 2021, for the team's Week 17 game against the Miami Dolphins, and reverted to the practice squad after the game. He made his NFL debut in the game, rushing for a team-high 63 yards and two touchdowns on 12 carries while catching a pass for 20 yards in a 56–26 win. He was elevated again on January 15 for the team's divisional playoff game against the Baltimore Ravens, and reverted to the practice squad again following the game. He signed a reserve/futures contract with the Bills on January 26, 2021.

On August 31, 2021, Williams was waived by the Bills and re-signed to the practice squad the next day.

=== New York Giants ===
On January 27, 2022, Williams signed a futures contract with the New York Giants.

On September 27, 2022, Williams was waived by the Giants. On September 29, he was re-signed to the practice squad. He was released on October 5.

On November 8, 2022, the New Orleans Saints hosted Williams for a workout, although no deal was reached.

=== BC Lions ===
On February 13, 2023, Williams signed with the BC Lions of the Canadian Football League (CFL). He was released by the Lions on June 27, 2023.

== Personal life ==
A NASCAR fan since his youth, Williams is an advisor to NASCAR Xfinity Series driver Joe Graf Jr.; the two befriended each other through a mutual acquaintance, and Williams joined Graf's SS-Green Light Racing team prior to the 2021 racing season.
