= Andre Roberts (American football) =

American football player (born 1988)

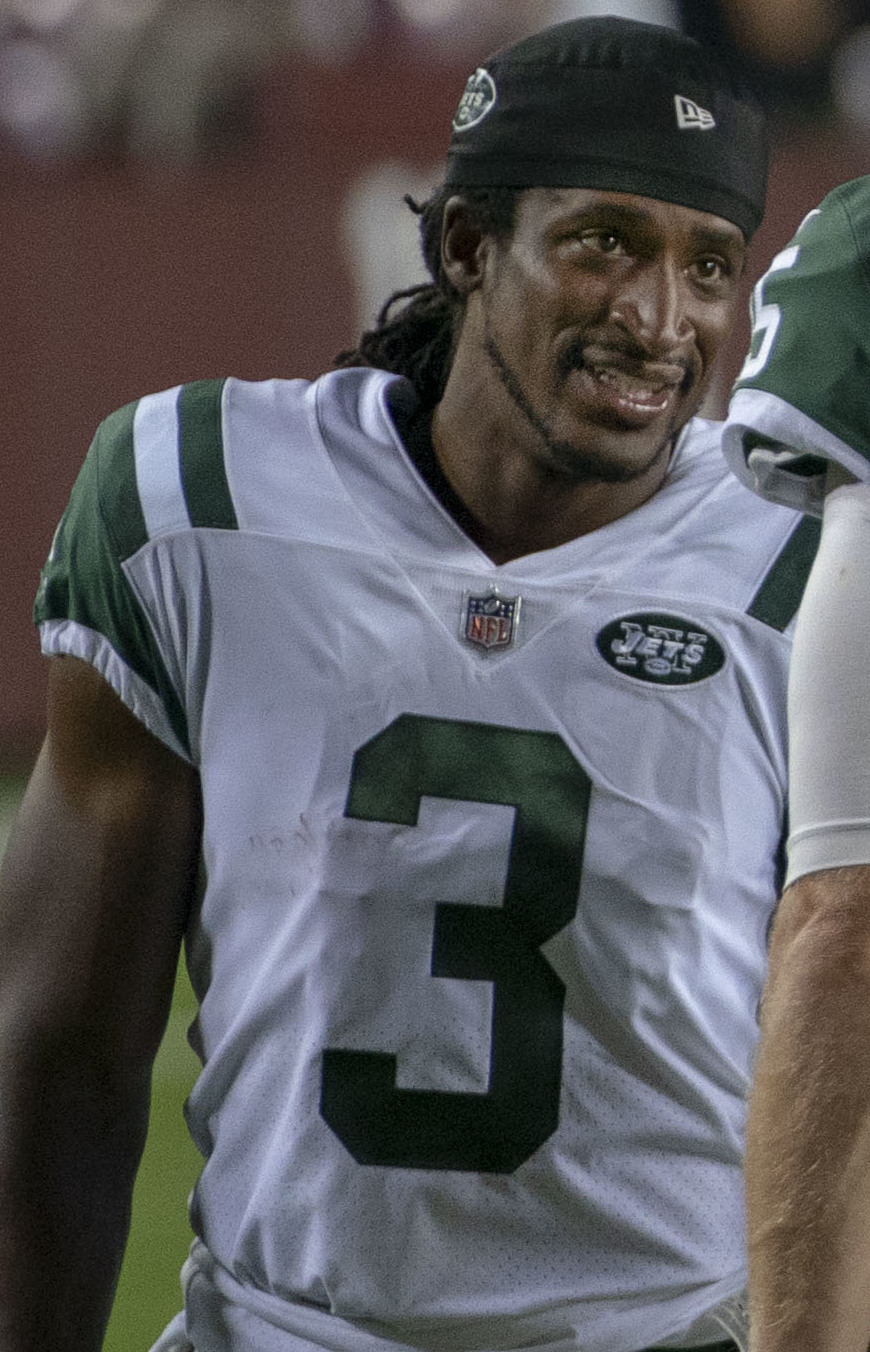
- Roberts with the New York Jets in 2018

No. 12, 19, 18, 7
- Positions: Wide receiver, return specialist

Personal information
- Born: January 9, 1988 (age 38); Columbia, South Carolina, U.S.
- Listed height: 5 ft 11 in (1.80 m)
- Listed weight: 195 lb (88 kg)

Career information
- High school: Spring Valley (Columbia)
- College: The Citadel (2006–2009)
- NFL draft: 2010: 3rd round, 88th overall pick

Career history
- Arizona Cardinals (2010–2013); Washington Redskins (2014–2015); Detroit Lions (2016); Atlanta Falcons (2017); New York Jets (2018); Buffalo Bills (2019–2020); Houston Texans (2021); Los Angeles Chargers (2021); Carolina Panthers (2022)

Awards and highlights
- First-team All-Pro (2018) (Note: Selected as a kick returner); 2× Second-team All-Pro (2020, 2021) (Note: Selected as a kick returner); 3× Pro Bowl (2018–2020); 2× NFL kickoff return yards leader (2018, 2021)

Career NFL statistics
- Receptions: 262
- Receiving yards: 3,079
- Receiving touchdowns: 15
- Return yards: 8,631
- Return touchdowns: 6
- Stats at Pro Football Reference

Andre McXavier Roberts (born January 9, 1988) is an American former professional football player who was a wide receiver and return specialist in the National Football League (NFL). He played college football for The Citadel Bulldogs and was selected by the Arizona Cardinals in the third round of the 2010 NFL draft. Roberts played for nine teams during his NFL career (the most in league history for a wide receiver or return specialist). In addition to the Cardinals, he played for the Washington Redskins, Detroit Lions, Atlanta Falcons, New York Jets, Buffalo Bills, Houston Texans, Los Angeles Chargers, and Carolina Panthers.

== Early life ==
A native of Fairbanks, Alaska, Roberts attended Spring Valley High School in Columbia, South Carolina, where he was a two-sport star in football and track. He earned All-region and All-area honors as a senior and led the Vikings to the regional championship and state semi-finals. He earned MVP honors for his performance in the 2005 North-South All-Star game.

In addition to football, Roberts lettered in track & field while at Spring Valley, leading his team to the state championship in 2003 and a second-place finish as a senior, the season he captured All-State recognition. He posted personal-bests of 11.2 in the 100-meter dash, 21.91 in the 200-meter dash and 48.60 in the 400-meter dash.

== College career ==
Roberts attended The Citadel, The Military College of South Carolina from 2006 to 2009, where he played football and ran track. He was a three-time All Southern Conference selection and two-time FCS All American who set school records for receptions in a game (14), season (95) and career (286); receiving yards in a season (1,334) and career (3,743); touchdown receptions in a game (4), season (14) and career (37); punt return yards in a season (461) and career (1,160) as well as career all-purpose yards (5,203).

Roberts joined The Citadel outdoor track team in mid-March 2007, earning his first Penn Relays Championship watch. He made his debut at the Furman Invitational (4/07), as he finished third in the 400 meters, running 50.91. Also at Furman, he finished second in the 200 meters with a time of 23.49. He ran a collegiate-best 200-meter time of 23.05 at the Chanticleer Invitational (4/14). He ran the anchor leg of the 4x100-meter relay that clocked 41.94 at the Southern Conference Championships (4/22), garnering All-Conference honors. Also ran the anchor leg of the 4×100-meter relay team that won at the Penn Relays for the fifth consecutive time in Citadel history. He graduated in three and a half years with a degree in accounting.

== Professional career ==
Pre-draft measurables
Height	Weight	Arm length	Hand span	40-yard dash	10-yard split	20-yard split	20-yard shuttle	Three-cone drill	Vertical jump	Broad jump	Bench press
5 ft 10 7/8 in (1.80 m)	195 lb (88 kg)	31 1/2 in (0.80 m)	9 1/2 in (0.24 m)	4.46 s	1.59 s	2.58 s	4.15 s	6.77 s	36.0 in (0.91 m)	10 ft 0 in (3.05 m)	15 reps
All values from NFL Combine

=== Arizona Cardinals ===
Roberts was taken in the third round with the 88th overall pick by the Arizona Cardinals in the 2010 NFL draft. The Cardinals originally obtained the pick used to select Roberts by trading Anquan Boldin to the Baltimore Ravens.

Roberts started out his rookie season playing limited time as a punt returner. As the season went on, Roberts started playing more snaps and started to move into the second receiver slot. He caught his first NFL touchdown against the Minnesota Vikings, a 27–24 loss in OT. He caught his second NFL touchdown, a 74-yard completion, on Christmas Day against the Dallas Cowboys, a game that was won in the last minute 27–26.

=== Washington Redskins ===
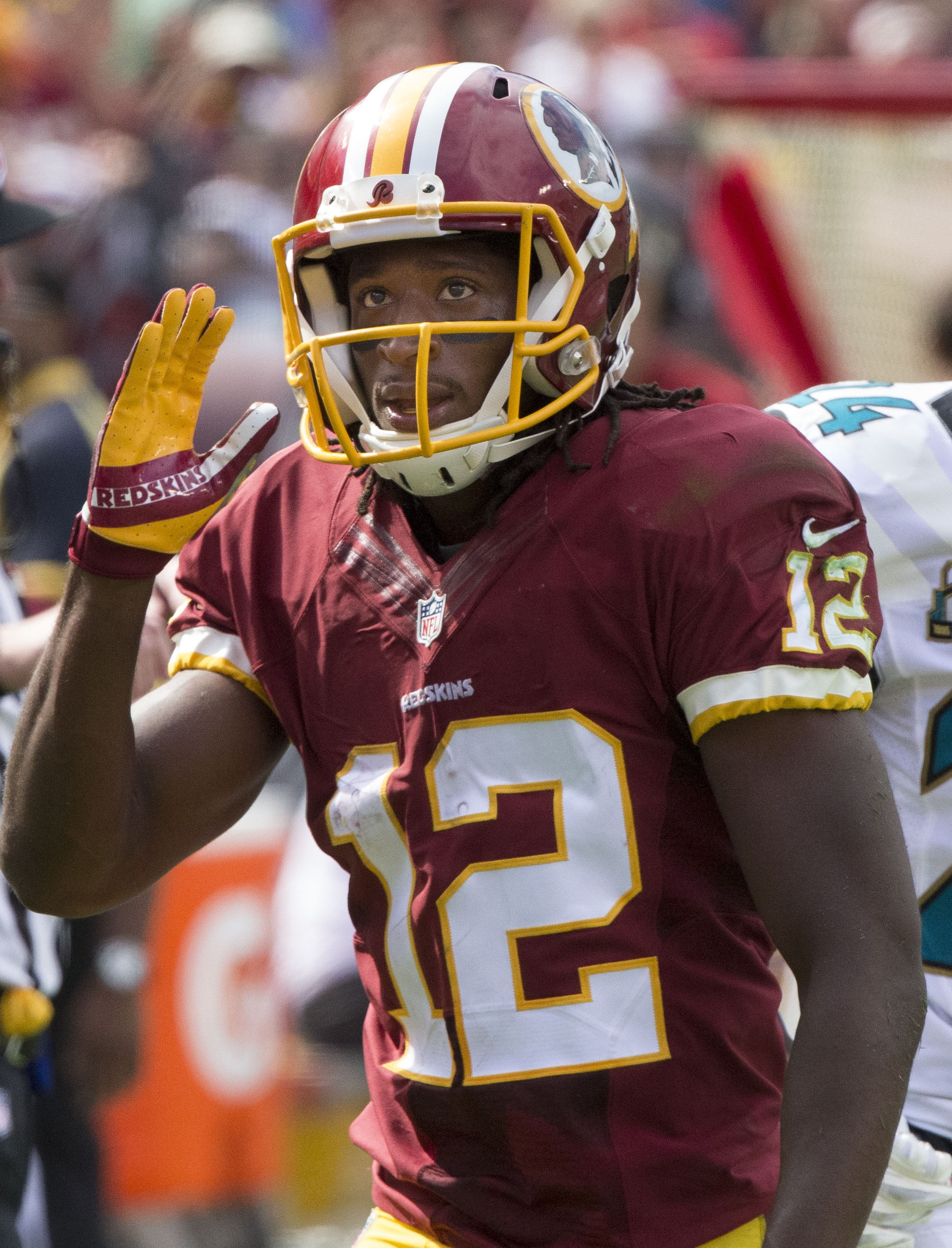
Roberts with the Washington Redskins in 2014

On March 11, 2014, Roberts and the Washington Redskins agreed to terms on a four-year contract, worth roughly $16 million. The contract was finalized the next day. Later that month, Roberts made a $12,000 donation to the Kirk Cousins Football Camp, allowing Roberts the rights to wear number 12, which he wore for four seasons in Arizona. He originally signed with the intention to be the Redskins' number two wide receiver, opposite of Pierre Garçon, but became the number three receiver after the signing of DeSean Jackson. He also became the team's new return specialist.

In the Week 4, 45–14 loss against the New York Giants, Roberts scored one of the only two Redskins' scores in the game after catching an 18-yard pass from Cousins. It was his first touchdown with the Redskins.

In Week 11 of the 2015 season, Roberts returned a kick 99 yards for a touchdown against the Carolina Panthers. On December 21, 2015, he was placed on injured reserve with a knee injury, ending his season.

Roberts was released by the Redskins on May 17, 2016.

=== Detroit Lions ===
On June 13, 2016, Roberts signed a one-year deal with the Detroit Lions.

On October 2, 2016, Roberts returned a punt 85 yards for a touchdown against the Chicago Bears. During a week 11 victory over the Jacksonville Jaguars, Roberts had another punt return touchdown, this time for 55 yards. Roberts also had several critical catches during the regular season, and finished the year with 14 receptions for 188 yards and a touchdown.

=== Atlanta Falcons ===
On March 14, 2017, Roberts signed a one-year contract with the Atlanta Falcons.

On September 10, 2017, in his Falcons debut, Roberts was the kickoff and punt returner in the 23–17 victory over the Chicago Bears at Soldier Field. He served as the Falcons' primary kick and punt returner in 2017, while only recording one catch for 12 yards on offense.

=== New York Jets ===
On March 23, 2018, Roberts signed with the New York Jets. On September 10, in the season opener against the Detroit Lions, Roberts scored his first punt return touchdown, which went for 78 yards, as a Jet. In a week 15 game against the Houston Texans he had a touchdown reception and added 93 yards in kick returns; he was named to the 2018 AFC Pro Bowl squad as a return specialist. In Week 16, against the Green Bay Packers, he had a 99-yard kickoff return for a touchdown and a career high 215 return yards. Roberts finished with career bests for both punt and kickoff returns with 324 and a league-leading 1,174 yards, respectively, in addition to adding 10 catches for 79 yards and a score on offense. He was the first member of the Jets named to the All-Pro team since 2011.

=== Buffalo Bills ===
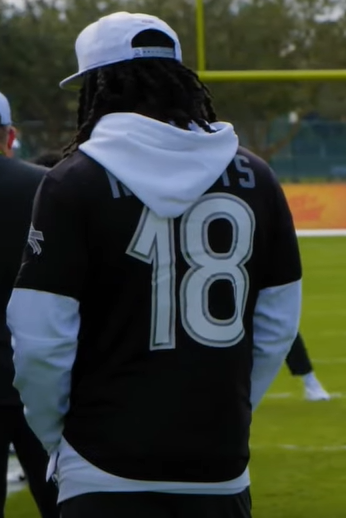
Roberts at the 2020 Pro Bowl

On March 13, 2019, Roberts signed a two-year contract with the Buffalo Bills. During the 2019 season he caught three passes and returned 53 kicks for 888 yards; he was named as an alternate to the Pro Bowl.

On September 5, 2020, Roberts was released by the Bills, but was re-signed the following day after some additional roster adjustments.

During the 2020 season, Roberts caught four passes for 34 yards, returning 29 punts for 286 yards (9.9 yards per return) and 32 kick returns for 961 yards (league-leading 30.0 yards per return). Roberts led the AFC in total return yards and was named a Pro Bowler and Second-team All-Pro.

=== Houston Texans ===
On March 24, 2021, Roberts signed a two-year deal with the Houston Texans. On October 18, 2021, Roberts was released by the Texans.

=== Los Angeles Chargers ===
On October 21, 2021, Roberts signed with the Los Angeles Chargers. In the 2021 season, he appeared in 16 games over the course of the season with two teams. He mainly had a special teams role. He led the league in total kickoff return yards with 1,010.

=== Carolina Panthers ===
On May 2, 2022, Roberts signed with the Carolina Panthers. He was placed on injured reserve on September 13, 2022, with a knee injury. He was activated on December 31. He played in three games in the 2022 season, playing only on special teams.

== NFL career statistics ==
Legend
	Led the league
**Bold**	Career high

=== Regular season ===
Year	Team	Games		Receiving					Rushing					Kick returns					Punt returns				
Year	Team	GP	GS	Rec	Yds	Avg	Lng	TD	Att	Yds	Avg	Lng	TD	Ret	Yds	Avg	Lng	TD	Ret	Yds	Avg	Lng	TD
2010	ARI	15	2	24	307	12.8	**74**	2	–	–	–	–	–	14	326	23.3	47	0	**35**	263	7.5	25	0
2011	ARI	**16**	**16**	51	586	11.5	45	2	3	27	9.0	12	0	2	33	16.5	21	0	2	-3	-1.5	0	0
2012	ARI	15	15	**64**	**759**	11.9	46	**5**	**4**	**29**	7.3	15	0	–	–	–	–	–	3	15	5.0	10	0
2013	ARI	**16**	2	43	471	11.0	34	2	–	–	–	–	–	–	–	–	–	–	–	–	–	–	–
2014	WAS	**16**	4	36	453	12.6	61	2	2	21	**10.5**	**19**	0	30	710	23.7	45	0	28	208	7.4	37	0
2015	WAS	9	0	11	135	12.3	38	0	–	–	–	–	–	7	231	**33.0**	99	**1**	–	–	–	–	–
2016	DET	**16**	1	14	188	13.4	44	1	–	–	–	–	–	33	747	22.6	42	0	20	246	12.3	**85**	**2**
2017	ATL	**16**	0	1	12	12.0	12	0	–	–	–	–	–	38	860	22.6	61	0	27	201	7.4	27	0
2018	NYJ	**16**	1	10	79	7.9	20	1	2	20	10.0	18	0	**40**	**1,174**	29.4	99	**1**	23	**324**	**14.1**	78	1
2019	BUF	13	0	3	20	6.7	7	0	1	7	7.0	7	0	25	664	26.6	66	0	28	223	8.0	22	0
2020	BUF	15	0	4	34	8.5	16	0	1	-3	-3.0	-3	0	32	961	30.0	60	0	29	286	9.9	38	0
2021	HOU	6	0	1	35	**35.0**	35	0	–	–	–	–	–	18	386	21.4	38	0	8	33	4.1	11	0
2021	LAC	10	0	–	–	–	–	–	3	19	6.3	9	0	19	624	32.8	**101**	**1**	12	66	5.5	15	0
2022	CAR	3	0	–	–	–	–	–	–	–	–	–	–	2	35	17.5	18	0	4	18	4.5	10	0
Career		182	41	262	3,079	11.8	74	15	16	120	7.5	19	0	260	6,751	26.0	101	3	219	1,880	8.6	85	3

=== Postseason ===
Year	Team	Games		Kick returns					Punt returns				
Year	Team	GP	GS	Ret	Yds	Avg	Lng	TD	Ret	Yds	Avg	Lng	TD
2015	WAS	0	0	Did not play due to injury									
2016	DET	1	0	4	76	**19.0**	22	0	1	0	0.0	0	0
2017	ATL	2	0	**5**	63	12.6	23	0	1	4	4.0	4	0
2019	BUF	1	0	–	–	–	–	–	1	**8**	**8.0**	**8**	0
2020	BUF	**3**	0	**5**	**95**	**19.0**	**29**	0	**2**	**8**	4.0	**8**	0
Career		7	0	14	234	16.7	29	0	5	20	4.0	8	0

== See also ==
- List of NFL players by most teams played for
