= 2024–25 NFL playoffs =

American football tournament

- Dates: January 11 – February 9, 2025
- Season: 2024
- Teams: 14
- Games played: 13
- Super Bowl LIX site: Caesars Superdome; New Orleans, Louisiana
- Defending champions: Kansas City Chiefs
- Champion: Philadelphia Eagles (5th title)
- Runner-up: Kansas City Chiefs
- Conference runners-up: Buffalo Bills; Washington Commanders
NFL playoffs
← 2023–24	2025–26 →

The NFL playoffs for the 2024 season began on January 11, 2025, and concluded with Super Bowl LIX on February 9 at Caesars Superdome in New Orleans, Louisiana, when the Philadelphia Eagles defeated the two-time defending champion Kansas City Chiefs 40–22 to win their second Super Bowl and fifth NFL championship in franchise history.

All playoff teams in both conferences won at least 10 games, the first time since 2012 and the first time since the NFL playoffs expanded to a 14-team format in 2020. This was the second time since their respective moves to Los Angeles where the Rams and Chargers both qualified for the playoffs, after 2018, and their first since sharing SoFi Stadium.

== Participants ==
Within each conference, the four division winners and the top three non-division winners with the best overall regular season records qualified for the playoffs. The four division winners are seeded 1–4 based on their overall won-lost-tied record, and the wild card teams are seeded 5–7. The NFL does not use a fixed bracket playoff system, and there are no restrictions regarding teams from the same division matching up in any round. In the first round, dubbed the Wild Card playoffs, the second-seeded division winner hosts the seventh seed wild card, the third seed hosts the sixth seed, and the fourth seed hosts the fifth seed. The 1 seed from each conference receives a first-round bye. In the second round, the Divisional playoffs, the number 1 seed hosts the lowest-seeded surviving team from the first round (seed 4, 5, 6, or 7), while the other two surviving teams play each other, with the higher-seeded team hosting. The two surviving teams from each conference's divisional playoff games then meet in the respective AFC and NFC Conference Championships, hosted by the higher seed. Although the Super Bowl, the championship round of the playoffs, is played at a neutral site, the designated home team is based on an annual rotation by conference.

Playoff seeds
Seed	AFC	NFC
1	Kansas City Chiefs (West winner)	Detroit Lions (North winner)
2	Buffalo Bills (East winner)	Philadelphia Eagles (East winner)
3	Baltimore Ravens (North winner)	Tampa Bay Buccaneers (South winner)
4	Houston Texans (South winner)	Los Angeles Rams (West winner)
5	Los Angeles Chargers (wild card)	Minnesota Vikings (wild card)
6	Pittsburgh Steelers (wild card)	Washington Commanders (wild card)
7	Denver Broncos (wild card)	Green Bay Packers (wild card)

== Bracket ==
Jan 11 – M&T Bank Stadium	Jan 19 – Highmark Stadium
6	Pittsburgh	14
3	Baltimore	28
3	Baltimore	25
Jan 26 – Arrowhead Stadium
Jan 12 – Highmark Stadium	2	Buffalo	27
AFC
7	Denver	7	2	Buffalo	29
Jan 18 – Arrowhead Stadium
2	Buffalo	31	1	Kansas City	32
AFC Championship
Jan 11 – NRG Stadium	4	Houston	14
1	Kansas City	23
5	LA Chargers	12
Divisional round	Feb 9 – Caesars Superdome
4	Houston	32
Wild-card round
A1	Kansas City	22
Jan 12 – Raymond James Stadium	Jan 18 – Ford Field	N2	Philadelphia	40
Super Bowl LIX
6	Washington	23
3	Tampa Bay	20
6	Washington	45
Jan 26 – Lincoln Financial Field
Jan 13 – State Farm Stadium (Note: The Wild Card playoff game between the Minnesota Vikings and the Los Angeles Rams was moved from SoFi Stadium in Inglewood, California, to State Farm Stadium in Glendale, Arizona, due to the then-ongoing wildfires in California.)	1	Detroit	31
NFC
5	Minnesota	9	6	Washington	23
Jan 19 – Lincoln Financial Field
4	LA Rams	27	2	Philadelphia	55
NFC Championship
Jan 12 – Lincoln Financial Field	4	LA Rams	22
2	Philadelphia	28
7	Green Bay	10
2	Philadelphia	22

== Schedule ==
The playoffs began with Wild Card Weekend on January 11–13, 2025. The Divisional round was played on January 18–19, with the winners of those games advancing to the Conference Championship games, which were played on January 26. Super Bowl LIX took place on February 9 at the Caesars Superdome in New Orleans, Louisiana.

Round	Away team	Score	Home team	Date	Kickoff (ET / UTC–5)	National TV network(s)	Streaming	Viewers (millions)	TV rating
Wild-card round	Los Angeles Chargers	12–32	Houston Texans	January 11, 2025	4:30 p.m.	CBS	Paramount+	26.6	12.5
Wild-card round	Pittsburgh Steelers	14–28	Baltimore Ravens	January 11, 2025	8:00 p.m.	—N/a (Note: Prime Video's game simulcasted locally on WPXI in Pittsburgh and WMAR in Baltimore.)	Prime Video	22.1	9.7
Wild-card round	Denver Broncos	7–31	Buffalo Bills	January 12, 2025	1:00 p.m.	CBS	Paramount+	31.2	15.7
Wild-card round	Green Bay Packers	10–22	Philadelphia Eagles	January 12, 2025	4:30 p.m.	Fox	—N/a	35.9	16.7
Wild-card round	Washington Commanders	23–20	Tampa Bay Buccaneers	January 12, 2025	8:00 p.m.	NBC	Peacock	29.0	13.5
Wild-card round	Minnesota Vikings	9–27	Los Angeles Rams	January 13, 2025	8:00 p.m.	ESPN/ABC	ESPN+	25.4	13.3
Divisional round	Houston Texans	14–23	Kansas City Chiefs	January 18, 2025	4:30 p.m.	ESPN/ABC	ESPN+	33.8	11.0
Divisional round	Washington Commanders	45–31	Detroit Lions	January 18, 2025	8:00 p.m.	Fox	—N/a	33.6	15.8
Divisional round	Los Angeles Rams	22–28	Philadelphia Eagles	January 19, 2025	3:00 p.m.	NBC	Peacock	37.9	16.7
Divisional round	Baltimore Ravens	25–27	Buffalo Bills	January 19, 2025	6:30 p.m.	CBS	Paramount+	43.1	20.0
Conference championships	Washington Commanders	23–55	Philadelphia Eagles	January 26, 2025	3:00 p.m.	Fox	—N/a	44.2	20.0
Conference championships	Buffalo Bills	29–32	Kansas City Chiefs	January 26, 2025	6:30 p.m.	CBS	Paramount+	57.7	25.9
Super Bowl LIX Caesars Superdome New Orleans, Louisiana	Kansas City Chiefs	22–40	Philadelphia Eagles	February 9, 2025	6:30 p.m.	Fox	Tubi	127.7	41.7

== Wild-card round ==
=== Saturday, January 11, 2025 ===
==== AFC: Houston Texans 32, Los Angeles Chargers 12 ====
Los Angeles Chargers at Houston Texans – Game summary

Quarter	1	2	3	4	Total
Chargers	6	0	0	6	12
Texans	0	10	10	12	32

at NRG Stadium, Houston, Texas

- Date: January 11, 2025
- Game time: 3:33 p.m. CST/4:33 p.m. EST
- Game weather: None (retractable roof closed)
- Game attendance: 71,408
- Referee: Land Clark
- TV announcers (CBS/Nickelodeon): Ian Eagle, Charles Davis, and Evan Washburn (CBS)
  Nate Burleson, SpongeBob SquarePants, (Note: Voiced by Tom Kenny) Patrick Star, (Note: Voiced by Bill Fagerbakke) Sandy Cheeks (Note: Voiced by Carolyn Lawrence) and Dylan Schefter (Nickelodeon)
- Recap, Game Book

Game information

First quarter

- LAC – Cameron Dicker 35-yard field goal, 9:37. Chargers 3–0. Drive: 10 plays, 57 yards, 5:23.
- LAC – Cameron Dicker 39-yard field goal, 6:35. Chargers 6–0. Drive: 6 plays, 12 yards, 2:53.

Second quarter

- HOU – Nico Collins 13-yard pass from C. J. Stroud (Kaʻimi Fairbairn kick), 0:58. Texans 7–6. Drive: 13 plays, 99 yards, 5:17.
- HOU – Kaʻimi Fairbairn 41-yard field goal, 0:03. Texans 10–6. Drive: 5 plays, 45 yards, 0:24.

Third quarter

- HOU – Kaʻimi Fairbairn 37-yard field goal, 4:48. Texans 13–6. Drive: 10 plays, 46 yards, 5:22.
- HOU – Eric Murray 38-yard interception return (Kaʻimi Fairbairn kick), 0:13. Texans 20–6.

Fourth quarter

- HOU – Kaʻimi Fairbairn 30-yard field goal, 12:00. Texans 23–6. Drive: 4 plays, 1 yard, 1:44.
- LAC – Ladd McConkey 86-yard pass from Justin Herbert (kick blocked), 10:38. Texans 23–12. Drive: 3 plays, 70 yards, 1:22.
- HOU – D'Angelo Ross defensive two-point conversion, 10:38. Texans 25–12.
- HOU – Joe Mixon 17-yard run (Kaʻimi Fairbairn), 3:42. Texans 32–12. Drive: 14 plays, 74 yards, 6:56.

Top passers

- LAC – Justin Herbert – 14/32, 242 yards, TD, 4 INT
- HOU – C. J. Stroud – 22/33, 282 yards, TD, INT

Top rushers

- LAC – J. K. Dobbins – 9 rushes, 26 yards
- HOU – Joe Mixon – 25 rushes, 106 yards, TD

Top receivers

- LAC – Ladd McConkey – 9 receptions, 197 yards, TD
- HOU – Nico Collins – 7 receptions, 122 yards, TD

This was the first playoff meeting between the Chargers and the Texans. Houston and Los Angeles did not meet in the regular season. The Texans have made eight appearances in the wild card round in their 23-year history, and they have been played at home in the Saturday, 4:30 p.m. slot each time.

The first half was a low-scoring affair, ending 10–6 to the Texans and highlighted by the two teams' quarterbacks—C. J. Stroud and Justin Herbert—throwing interceptions on back-to-back plays. The second half produced more points, as Herbert threw three more interceptions. In the fourth quarter, Texans cornerback D'Angelo Ross blocked an extra point attempt and returned it for a defensive two-point conversion, the first such score to occur in a postseason game since the play was added in 2015. This was the first NFL game to end with a 32–12 final score, known as a scorigami. Ladd McConkey finished the game with 9 catches for 192 receiving yards, breaking the playoff record for receiving yards by a rookie.

This game received significant online coverage as, during the Nickelodeon broadcast, Chargers head coach Jim Harbaugh was "swallowed" by the SpongeBob SquarePants character "Dirty Bubble". After this scene, the Chargers were outscored 32–6, leading to some fans seeing it as an omen.

==== AFC: Baltimore Ravens 28, Pittsburgh Steelers 14 ====
Pittsburgh Steelers vs. Baltimore Ravens – Game summary

Quarter	1	2	3	4	Total
Steelers	0	0	14	0	14
Ravens	7	14	7	0	28

at M&T Bank Stadium, Baltimore, Maryland

- Date: January 11, 2025
- Game time: 8:11 p.m. EST
- Game weather: Clear, 32 °F (0 °C)
- Game attendance: 70,546
- Referee: Alex Kemp
- TV announcers (Prime Video): Al Michaels, Kirk Herbstreit, and Kaylee Hartung
- Recap, Game Book

Game information

First quarter

- BAL – Rashod Bateman 15-yard pass from Lamar Jackson (Justin Tucker kick), 4:45. Ravens 7–0. Drive: 13 plays, 95 yards, 7:13.

Second quarter

- BAL – Derrick Henry 8-yard run (Justin Tucker kick), 4:09. Ravens 14–0. Drive: 13 plays, 85 yards, 7:56.
- BAL – Justice Hill 5-yard pass from Lamar Jackson (Justin Tucker kick), 0:02. Ravens 21–0. Drive: 9 plays, 90 yards, 1:51.

Third quarter

- PIT – Van Jefferson 30-yard pass from Russell Wilson (Chris Boswell kick), 8:05. Ravens 21–7. Drive: 9 plays, 98 yards, 3:24.
- BAL – Derrick Henry 44-yard run (Justin Tucker kick), 5:49. Ravens 28–7. Drive: 4 plays, 70 yards, 2:16.
- PIT – George Pickens 36-yard pass from Russell Wilson (Chris Boswell kick), 3:24. Ravens 28–14. Drive: 5 plays, 70 yards, 2:25.

Fourth quarter

- No scoring plays.

Top passers

- PIT – Russell Wilson – 20/29, 270 yards, 2 TD
- BAL – Lamar Jackson – 16/21, 175 yards, 2 TD

Top rushers

- PIT – Najee Harris – 6 rushes, 17 yards
- BAL – Derrick Henry – 26 rushes, 186 yards, 2 TD

Top receivers

- PIT – George Pickens – 5 receptions, 87 yards, TD
- BAL – Isaiah Likely – 3 receptions, 53 yards

This was the fifth playoff meeting between the Steelers and the Ravens; the Steelers led 3–1 in previous postseason meetings between the two, all of which were previously played in Pittsburgh. Their most recent playoff meeting came in the 2014 AFC Wild Card round, when the Ravens beat the Steelers 30–17. The two teams split the regular season series, with the Steelers winning 18–16 in Pittsburgh in Week 11 and the Ravens winning 34–17 in Baltimore in Week 16. This was Amazon Prime Video's first exclusive NFL playoff game.

After forcing a punt on the Steelers' first offensive possession, the Ravens went 95 yards on their opening drive, culminating with Lamar Jackson hitting Rashod Bateman for a 15-yard touchdown to go up 7–0, a lead the Ravens never surrendered. Both teams exchanged punts on their next few possessions before Baltimore scored their second touchdown of the game on a 8-yard run from Derrick Henry. Before the half ended, the Ravens scored another touchdown on Jackson pass to Justice Hill, now leading 21–0. Despite the Steelers eventually pulling within two scores in the third quarter, the fourth quarter went scoreless and the Ravens held on to defeat the Steelers 28–14.

Jackson completed 16 of 21 passes for 175 yards and two touchdowns, while also rushing for 81 yards. Derrick Henry set a Ravens franchise record for rushing yards in a postseason game by rushing for 186 yards and two touchdowns. The Ravens amassed 299 total rushing yards.

=== Sunday, January 12, 2025 ===
==== AFC: Buffalo Bills 31, Denver Broncos 7 ====
Denver Broncos vs. Buffalo Bills – Game summary

Quarter	1	2	3	4	Total
Broncos	7	0	0	0	7
Bills	3	7	11	10	31

at Highmark Stadium, Orchard Park, New York

- Date: January 12, 2025
- Game time: 1:02 p.m. EST
- Game weather: Cloudy, 32 °F (0 °C)
- Game attendance: 70,332
- Referee: Bill Vinovich
- TV announcers (CBS): Jim Nantz, Tony Romo, Tracy Wolfson, and Jay Feely
- Recap, Game Book

Game information

First quarter

- DEN – Troy Franklin 43-yard pass from Bo Nix (Wil Lutz kick), 12:36. Broncos 7–0. Drive: 5 plays, 70 yards, 2:24.
- BUF – Tyler Bass 26-yard field goal, 7:07. Broncos 7–3. Drive: 12 plays, 59 yards, 5:29.

Second quarter

- BUF – James Cook 5-yard run (Tyler Bass kick), 12:57. Bills 10–7. Drive: 13 plays, 81 yards, 7:35.

Third quarter

- BUF – Tyler Bass 27-yard field goal, 10:03. Bills 13–7. Drive: 8 plays, 55 yards, 4:57.
- BUF – Ty Johnson 24-yard pass from Josh Allen (Josh Allen–Keon Coleman pass), 3:06. Bills 21–7. Drive: 9 plays, 73 yards, 5:34.

Fourth quarter

- BUF – Curtis Samuel 55-yard pass from Josh Allen (Tyler Bass kick), 14:49. Bills 28–7. Drive: 3 plays, 59 yards, 1:17.
- BUF – Tyler Bass 34-yard field goal, 4:37. Bills 31–7. Drive: 14 plays, 70 yards, 6:55.

Top passers

- DEN – Bo Nix – 13/22, 144 yards, TD
- BUF – Josh Allen – 20/26, 272 yards, 2 TD

Top rushers

- DEN – Bo Nix – 4 rushes, 43 yards
- BUF – James Cook – 23 rushes, 120 yards, TD

Top receivers

- DEN – Courtland Sutton – 5 receptions, 75 yards
- BUF – Curtis Samuel – 3 receptions, 68 yards, TD

This was the second playoff meeting between Buffalo and Denver; the first was in the 1991 AFC Championship, when the Bills beat the Broncos 10–7 in Buffalo to reach Super Bowl XXVI. The Bills and the Broncos did not meet in the regular season. It was Denver's first postseason appearance since winning Super Bowl 50 nine years earlier.

On the opening possession of the game, rookie Bo Nix capped a five-play opening drive with a 43-yard touchdown pass to former college teammate Troy Franklin. The Bills responded with a field goal by Tyler Bass to cap a 12-play drive on their opening possession and then forced a quick three-and-out to get the ball back. James Cook added a touchdown on a 5-yard run early in the second quarter to give the Bills a 10–7 lead. Before the end of the first half, Broncos kicker Wil Lutz missed a 50-yard field goal that would have tied the game at 10–10.

After Bass knocked home a 27-yard field goal at the beginning of the third quarter, leading 13–7, Buffalo broke open the game with a Josh Allen touchdown pass to Ty Johnson on fourth down with 3:06 left in the third quarter. The score held up following a replay review, which showed Johnson's foot touching out of bounds but only after he secured the ball. Moments later, a two-point conversion was successful on an Allen pass to Keon Coleman. On the first play of the fourth quarter, Allen's 55-yard touchdown pass to Curtis Samuel effectively sealed the game for Buffalo. Bass closed out the scoring with his second field goal of the game as the Bills won 31–7. The Bills methodically wore down the Broncos in the game with a combined 210 yards rushing (120 yards from Cook, 46 from Allen, 44 from Johnson). Allen added 272 yards through the air, with two touchdowns.

==== NFC: Philadelphia Eagles 22, Green Bay Packers 10 ====
Green Bay Packers vs. Philadelphia Eagles – Game summary

Quarter	1	2	3	4	Total
Packers	0	0	3	7	10
Eagles	10	0	6	6	22

at Lincoln Financial Field, Philadelphia, Pennsylvania

- Date: January 12, 2025
- Game time: 4:41 p.m. EST
- Game weather: Cloudy, 40 °F (4 °C)
- Game attendance: 69,879
- Referee: Brad Allen
- TV announcers (Fox): Kevin Burkhardt, Tom Brady, Erin Andrews, and Tom Rinaldi
- Recap, Game Book

Game information

First quarter

- PHI – Jahan Dotson 11-yard pass from Jalen Hurts (Jake Elliott kick), 13:21. Eagles 7–0. Drive: 3 plays, 28 yards, 1:32.
- PHI – Jake Elliott 31-yard field goal, 0:19. Eagles 10–0. Drive: 11 plays, 57 yards, 5:00.

Second quarter

- No scoring plays.

Third quarter

- GB – Brandon McManus 26-yard field goal, 5:46. Eagles 10–3. Drive: 12 plays, 76 yards, 5:47.
- PHI – Dallas Goedert 24-yard pass from Jalen Hurts (kick failed, wide left), 3:20. Eagles 16–3. Drive: 5 plays, 68 yards, 2:26.

Fourth quarter

- GB – Josh Jacobs 1-yard run (Brandon McManus kick), 14:56. Eagles 16–10. Drive: 9 plays, 78 yards, 3:24.
- PHI – Jake Elliott 30-yard field goal, 7:33. Eagles 19–10. Drive: 13 plays, 58 yards, 7:23.
- PHI – Jake Elliott 32-yard field goal, 3:12. Eagles 22–10. Drive: 6 plays, 27 yards, 1:46.

Top passers

- GB – Jordan Love – 20/33, 212 yards, 3 INT
- PHI – Jalen Hurts – 13/21, 131 yards, 2 TD

Top rushers

- GB – Josh Jacobs – 18 rushes, 81 yards, TD
- PHI – Saquon Barkley – 25 rushes, 119 yards

Top receivers

- GB – Jayden Reed – 4 receptions, 46 yards
- PHI – DeVonta Smith – 4 receptions, 55 yards

This was the fourth playoff meeting between Philadelphia and Green Bay. The Eagles led the playoff series 2–1, including wins in the 1960 NFL Championship Game and the 2003 NFC Divisional Game, where the Eagles converted on 4th-and-26 on their game-tying drive late in the fourth quarter, although the Packers won the most recent playoff meeting, a 21–16 win in the 2010 NFC Wild Card Game in Philadelphia en route to their win in Super Bowl XLV. In the regular season, the Eagles defeated the Packers 34–29 in a neutral-site game in São Paulo, Brazil in Week 1.

The Eagles recovered a fumble on the opening kickoff and scored a touchdown to take an early 7–0 lead. At the end of the quarter, the Eagles kicked a field goal to extend the lead to 10–0. Following a scoreless second quarter, the Packers cut the lead to 10–3 with a field goal almost 10 minutes into the third quarter, but the Eagles soon extended the lead to 16–3 with a Dallas Goedert touchdown. While the Packers cut the deficit to 16–10 early in the fourth quarter with a touchdown from Josh Jacobs, the Eagles responded with a field goal to go up 19–10. Following a turnover on downs from the Packers, the Eagles kicked another field goal to take a 22–10 lead. Cornerback Quinyon Mitchell then intercepted Jordan Love in the end zone, sealing the win for Philadelphia.

A video filmed during the game of an Eagles fan harassing a female Packers fan with derogatory and misogynistic phrases in the stands went viral on social media. The cameraman, who is the woman's fiancée, posted the video online and asked people watching to "help me out and find this man". He avoided any physical altercation with the Eagles fan in order to not get himself kicked out. The Eagles fan was banned for life from attending Lincoln Financial Field, and his place of employment fired him after being notified of his actions and conducting investigations. He later issued an apology.

==== NFC: Washington Commanders 23, Tampa Bay Buccaneers 20 ====
Washington Commanders vs. Tampa Bay Buccaneers – Game summary

Quarter	1	2	3	4	Total
Commanders	0	10	3	10	23
Buccaneers	3	7	7	3	20

at Raymond James Stadium, Tampa, Florida

- Date: January 12, 2025
- Game time: 8:16 p.m. EST
- Game weather: Cloudy, 58 °F (14 °C)
- Game attendance: 64,614
- Referee: Craig Wrolstad
- TV announcers (NBC): Mike Tirico, Cris Collinsworth, and Melissa Stark
- Recap, Game Book

Game information

First quarter

- TB – Chase McLaughlin 50-yard field goal, 11:35. Buccaneers 3–0. Drive: 8 plays, 38 yards, 3:25.

Second quarter

- WAS – Dyami Brown 10-yard pass from Jayden Daniels (Zane Gonzalez kick), 9:26. Commanders 7–3. Drive: 17 plays, 92 yards, 9:08.
- WAS – Zane Gonzalez 52-yard field goal, 1:52. Commanders 10–3. Drive: 11 plays, 37 yards, 5:28.
- TB – Mike Evans 1-yard pass from Baker Mayfield (Chase McLaughlin kick), 0:10. Tied 10–10. Drive: 7 plays, 74 yards, 1:42.

Third quarter

- WAS – Zane Gonzalez 22-yard field goal, 10:30. Commanders 13–10. Drive: 10 plays, 66 yards, 4:30.
- TB – Bucky Irving 4-yard pass from Baker Mayfield (Chase McLaughlin kick), 4:31. Buccaneers 17–13. Drive: 10 plays, 72 yards, 5:59.

Fourth quarter

- WAS – Terry McLaurin 5-yard pass from Jayden Daniels (Zane Gonzalez kick), 9:46. Commanders 20–17. Drive: 4 plays, 13 yards, 2:10.
- TB – Chase McLaughlin 32-yard field goal, 4:41. Tied 20–20. Drive: 8 plays, 61 yards, 5:05.
- WAS – Zane Gonzalez 37-yard field goal, 0:00. Commanders 23–20. Drive: 10 plays, 51 yards, 4:41

Top passers

- WAS – Jayden Daniels – 24/35, 268 yards, 2 TD
- TB – Baker Mayfield – 15/18, 185 yards, 2 TD

Top rushers

- WAS – Jayden Daniels – 13 rushes, 36 yards
- TB – Bucky Irving – 17 rushes, 77 yards

Top receivers

- WAS – Terry McLaurin – 7 receptions, 89 yards, TD
- TB – Mike Evans – 7 receptions, 92 yards, TD

This was the first playoff matchup between Tampa Bay and Washington since the 2020 NFC Wild Card, when the Buccaneers won 31–23 over the then-Washington Football Team, en route to their win in Super Bowl LV. The Commanders and Buccaneers met in Tampa in Week 1 of the regular season, with the Buccaneers winning 37–20. This was the fourth playoff meeting between the two teams, with the Buccaneers holding a 2–1 series lead. In addition, this was Washington's first playoff game under the 'Commanders' nickname.

The Buccaneers opened the scoring on a Chase McLaughlin 50-yard field goal on the first possession of the game. On the Commanders' first possession, they turned the ball over on downs after a Jayden Daniels pass to Austin Ekeler on fourth down fell incomplete from Tampa Bay's 20-yard line. After the Buccaneers punted, Washington scored on a Daniels pass to Dyami Brown to cap off a 9-minute, 17-play drive. After a successful Zane Gonzalez field goal, which made the score 10–3, Baker Mayfield led the Bucs down the field and scored on a 1-yard pass to Mike Evans, who was covered for most of the first half by rival Marshon Lattimore. This tied the score at 10–10 at halftime.

On the Commanders' first possession of the second half, Gonzalez added another field goal, giving Washington a temporary lead. The next possession, the Buccaneers went ahead 17–13 on a 4-yard Mayfield pass to rookie running back Bucky Irving. The Commanders' next possession saw them drive 67 yards in 12 plays, as the game moved into the fourth quarter. They then failed on a fourth-down conversion for the second time in the game, turning the ball over on downs at the Tampa Bay 3-yard line. Three plays later, Mike Evans made a stretching reach to secure a critical first down, but the Buccaneers gave the ball right back to Washington on next play. Mayfield committed a costly turnover, a botched handoff to rookie Jalen McMillan on a jet sweep, resulted in a fumble recovered by Bobby Wagner at the Tampa Bay 13. Four plays later, facing yet another fourth-down conversion, a 4th-and-2 at the Tampa Bay 5-yard line, Daniels pass to Terry McLaurin gave the Commanders a 20–17 lead. On their next possession, late in the fourth quarter, Tampa Bay could not pick up a first down deep in Washington territory after Mayfield was tackled for no gain on 2nd-and-1, and Irving was tackled for a loss on a seemingly botched 3rd-and-1 running play. McLaughlin kicked a 32-yard field goal to tie the score at 20–20.

With 4:41 left in the game, playing in his first playoff game as a rookie, Daniels led the Commanders down the field in position for Zane Gonzalez to kick a 37-yard field goal. In what immediately became known as the 'Divisional Doink' game, Gonzalez's kick sailed toward the right upright, hit the post, but fell through, giving the Commanders the 23–20 victory as time expired. This was the team's first victory in the playoffs since 2005–2006 season (coincidentally, also against the Buccaneers in Tampa) and the first under new owner, Josh Harris. For the third game this season, Washington had a no-turnover, no-punt game.

=== Monday, January 13, 2025 ===
==== NFC: Los Angeles Rams 27, Minnesota Vikings 9 ====
Minnesota Vikings vs. Los Angeles Rams – Game summary

Quarter	1	2	3	4	Total
Vikings	0	3	6	0	9
Rams	10	14	3	0	27

at State Farm Stadium, Glendale, Arizona

- Date: January 13, 2025
- Game time: 6:16 p.m. MST/8:16 p.m. EST
- Game weather: None (retractable roof closed)
- Game attendance: 64,515
- Referee: John Hussey
- TV announcers (ABC/ESPN/ESPN2/ESPN+): Joe Buck, Troy Aikman, Lisa Salters, and Laura Rutledge
- Recap, Game Book

Game information

First quarter

- LAR – Kyren Williams 5-yard pass from Matthew Stafford (Joshua Karty kick), 10:22. Rams 7–0. Drive: 7 plays, 70 yards, 4:38.
- LAR – Joshua Karty 34-yard field goal, 4:01. Rams 10–0. Drive: 8 plays, 62 yards, 4:09.

Second quarter

- MIN – Will Reichard 34-yard field goal, 14:17. Rams 10–3. Drive: 9 plays, 54 yards, 4:44.
- LAR – Jared Verse 57-yard fumble return (Joshua Karty kick), 4:35. Rams 17–3.
- LAR – Davis Allen 13-yard pass from Matthew Stafford (Joshua Karty kick), 0:15. Rams 24–3. Drive: 5 plays, 39 yards, 1:12.

Third quarter

- LAR – Joshua Karty 44-yard field goal, 7:19. Rams 27–3. Drive: 11 plays, 51 yards, 6:13.
- MIN – T. J. Hockenson 26-yard pass from Sam Darnold (pass failed), 5:05. Rams 27–9. Drive: 6 plays, 62 yards, 2:14.

Fourth quarter

- No scoring plays.

Top passers

- MIN – Sam Darnold – 25/40, 245 yards, TD, INT
- LAR – Matthew Stafford – 19/27, 209 yards, 2 TD

Top rushers

- MIN – Aaron Jones – 13 rushes, 48 yards
- LAR – Kyren Williams – 16 rushes, 76 yards

Top receivers

- MIN – T. J. Hockenson – 5 receptions, 64 yards, TD
- LAR – Tyler Higbee – 5 receptions, 58 yards

This was the eighth matchup in the playoffs between the Vikings and Rams, and the first since the then-St. Louis Rams won 49–37 in the 1999 Divisional Round. The two teams met on October 24 in the regular season, where Los Angeles defeated Minnesota 30–20. Overall, the Vikings hold the 5–2 historical advantage in the playoffs.

On January 9, the NFL announced that the game would be moved to State Farm Stadium in Glendale, Arizona, due to the series of wildfires in the Los Angeles area.

The Rams got off to a quick start, scoring a touchdown on a seven-play drive, capped off by a short pass over the middle from Matthew Stafford to Kyren Williams. The Vikings went three-and-out on their first possession of the game. The Rams and Vikings exchanged field goals, leaving the score at 10–3. Early in the second quarter, Sam Darnold had his intended pass to Jordan Addison intercepted by Cobie Durant. The Rams, however, could not capitalize off the turnover going a quick three-and-out. On their next possession, the Vikings drove down the field to get in Rams territory; however, Darnold was stripped sacked by Ahkello Witherspoon, which was picked up and scored by Jared Verse for a 57-yard touchdown. The Rams added another touchdown, via a 12-yard Puka Nacua catch from Stafford, to give the Rams a commanding 24–3 lead at halftime.

A T. J. Hockenson catch-and-run added a touchdown for the Vikings in the third quarter, but they never seriously got back into the game. The Rams defeated the Vikings, 27–9, for their first playoff win since winning Super Bowl LVI.

Los Angeles' defense registered nine sacks on Minnesota quarterback Sam Darnold, tying a playoff record. Darnold's 82 yards lost on sacks were the most of any quarterback in a playoff game since the 1970 merger. It was the Vikings' 9th loss in their last 12 playoff games and their 32nd postseason game loss all-time (setting an NFL record), with 24 of them by more than one score.

== Divisional round ==
=== Saturday, January 18, 2025 ===
==== AFC: Kansas City Chiefs 23, Houston Texans 14 ====
Houston Texans vs. Kansas City Chiefs – Game summary

Quarter	1	2	3	4	Total
Texans	3	3	6	2	14
Chiefs	6	7	0	10	23

at Arrowhead Stadium, Kansas City, Missouri

- Date: January 18, 2025
- Game time: 3:33 p.m. CST/4:33 p.m. EST
- Game weather: 23 °F (−5 °C)
- Game attendance: 73,458
- Referee: Clay Martin
- TV announcers (ESPN/ABC): Joe Buck, Troy Aikman, Lisa Salters and Laura Rutledge
- Recap, Game Book

Game information

First quarter

- KC – Harrison Butker 32-yard field goal, 13:58. Chiefs 3–0. Drive: 4 plays, −1 yard, 1:02.
- HOU – Kaʻimi Fairbairn 30-yard field goal, 8:41. Tied 3–3. Drive: 10 plays, 68 yards, 5:17.
- KC – Harrison Butker 36-yard field goal, 3:59. Chiefs 6–3. Drive: 9 plays, 51 yards, 4:42.

Second quarter

- KC – Kareem Hunt 3-yard run (Harrison Butker kick), 4:36. Chiefs 13–3. Drive: 5 plays, 55 yards, 2:25.
- HOU – Kaʻimi Fairbairn 48-yard field goal, 0:16. Chiefs 13–6. Drive: 9 plays, 41 yards, 4:20.

Third quarter

- HOU – Joe Mixon 13-yard run (kick failed, wide right), 4:36. Chiefs 13–12. Drive: 15 plays, 82 yards, 10:24.

Fourth quarter

- KC – Travis Kelce 11-yard pass from Patrick Mahomes (Harrison Butker kick), 11:52. Chiefs 20–12. Drive: 13 plays, 81 yards, 7:44.
- KC – Harrison Butker 27-yard field goal, 4:38. Chiefs 23–12. Drive: 7 plays, 36 yards, 2:57.
- HOU – Matt Araiza out of bounds in the end zone, forced by Jared Wayne, for a safety, 0:09. Chiefs 23–14.

Top passers

- HOU – C. J. Stroud – 19/28, 245 yards
- KC – Patrick Mahomes – 16/25, 177 yards, TD

Top rushers

- HOU – Joe Mixon – 18 rushes, 88 yards, TD
- KC – Kareem Hunt – 8 rushes, 44 yards, TD

Top receivers

- HOU – Nico Collins – 5 receptions, 81 yards
- KC – Travis Kelce – 7 receptions, 117 yards, TD

This was the third overall playoff meeting between the Chiefs and Texans. The Chiefs won the first two playoff meetings, most recently the 2019 AFC Divisional Game, which the Chiefs won 51–31 in Kansas City en route to winning Super Bowl LIV despite trailing 24–0 during the second quarter. In the regular season, the Chiefs defeated the Texans 27–19 in Kansas City during Week 16.

The Chiefs, playing in their first meaningful game since Christmas Day, 24 days prior, received an immediate boost when kicker returner Nikko Remigio returned the opening kickoff for 63 yards. A Texans unsportsmanlike conduct penalty on the play took the ball to Houston's 13-yard line. The Chiefs went three-and-out and kicked the field goal to take the early lead. The Texans responded with a Kaʻimi Fairbairn field kick after a 10-play drive, tying the game. Harrison Butker kicked the Chiefs into the lead on the next possession with a 36-yard field goal. A few possessions later, Fairbairn missed a 55-yard kick wide to the right, giving the Chiefs a short field. The Chiefs scored on this possession; a Kareem Hunt short touchdown run at the goal line, which was highlighted by a Patrick Mahomes pass and run to Travis Kelce for 49 yards, the longest playoff reception in Kelce's career. Fairbairn snuck in a 48-yard field goal on the next possession just before halftime, to pull the Texans within seven points.

The Texans opened the third quarter with the ball and scored on a Joe Mixon 13-yard run to cap a 10-minute drive; however, Fairbairn missed the extra-point, leaving Houston one point behind, 13–12. The Chiefs responded with seven minute and 44 second drive, with a Mahomes to Kelce touchdown catch as Mahomes was falling to the ground. It was the duo's 18th touchdown connection, extending their playoff record for a quarterback and pass catcher. In the fourth quarter with 10:05 left in the game, the Texans failed on a fourth down on Kansas City 40-yard line. On the play, C. J. Stroud was sacked by regular season team sack leader George Karlaftis for 16 yards, the fourth sack of the game for Kansas City's defense. The teams exchanged three-and-outs before Harrison Butker extended the Chiefs lead to 23–12 with a field goal late in the fourth quarter. Stroud led the Texans to the red zone on the next possession, but an eighth sack against him forced him out of the game with an injury. On the next play, Fairbairn missed his third kick of the game, via a block by Leo Chenal. Chiefs punter Matt Araiza took a safety rather than punting the ball back to the Texans to end the game.

The Chiefs became the first team in NFL postseason history to win while forcing no turnovers and being outgained by at least 100 yards. Previously, teams were 0–49.

The game became controversial with viewers due to controversial penalties that were believed to benefit Patrick Mahomes. After what appeared to be a clean hit from Texans edge rusher Will Anderson Jr. on Patrick Mahomes, officials penalized Anderson for roughing the passer, which gave the Chiefs a first down instead of a fourth and long. Anderson later said in his postgame interview that the game was "us vs. the refs"; Texans head coach DeMeco Ryans was quoted as saying, "We knew going into this game that it was us versus everybody... And I mean everybody."

The Chiefs' 23–14 win gave them 16 playoff wins in the Mahomes–Reid era. In addition, Andy Reid joined the 300-win club with the victory. Kansas City hosted the AFC Championship Game the next Sunday, in what was their seventh straight AFC Championship game, one short of the record set by the 2011–2018 Patriots.

==== NFC: Washington Commanders 45, Detroit Lions 31 ====
Washington Commanders vs. Detroit Lions – Game summary

Quarter	1	2	3	4	Total
Commanders	3	28	0	14	45
Lions	7	14	7	3	31

at Ford Field, Detroit, Michigan

- Date: January 18, 2025
- Game time: 8:10 p.m. EST
- Game weather: None (indoor stadium)
- Game attendance: 64,774
- Referee: Ronald Torbert
- TV announcers (Fox): Kevin Burkhardt, Tom Brady, Erin Andrews and Tom Rinaldi
- Recap, Game Book

Game information

First quarter

- DET – Jahmyr Gibbs 1-yard run (Jake Bates kick), 7:36. Lions 7–0. Drive: 6 plays, 71 yards, 3:02.
- WAS – Zane Gonzalez 47-yard field goal, 3:50. Lions 7–3. Drive: 10 plays, 41 yards, 3:46.

Second quarter

- WAS – Brian Robinson Jr. 2-yard run (Zane Gonzalez kick), 10:55. Commanders 10–7. Drive: 11 plays, 78 yards, 5:00.
- DET – Sam LaPorta 2-yard pass from Jared Goff (Jake Bates kick), 7:44. Lions 14–10. Drive: 7 plays, 70 yards, 3:11.
- WAS – Terry McLaurin 58-yard pass from Jayden Daniels (Zane Gonzalez kick), 6:23. Commanders 17–14. Drive: 3 plays, 70 yards, 1:21.
- WAS – Quan Martin 40-yard interception return (Zane Gonzalez kick), 5:25. Commanders 24–14. Drive: 2 plays, −4 yards, 0:58.
- DET – Jameson Williams 61-yard run (Jake Bates kick), 4:01. Commanders 24–21. Drive: 3 plays, 73 yards, 1:24.
- WAS – Zach Ertz 5-yard pass from Jayden Daniels (Zane Gonzalez kick), 1:46. Commanders 31–21. Drive: 7 plays, 70 yards, 2:15.

Third quarter

- DET – Jahmyr Gibbs 8-yard run (Jake Bates kick), 6:57. Commanders 31–28. Drive: 11 plays, 91 yards, 5:56.

Fourth quarter

- WAS – Brian Robinson Jr. 1-yard run (Zane Gonzalez kick), 13:29. Commanders 38–28. Drive: 15 plays, 70 yards, 8:28.
- WAS – Jeremy McNichols 1-yard run (Zane Gonzalez kick), 7:31. Commanders 45–28. Drive: 8 plays, 66 yards, 4:33.
- DET – Jake Bates 28-yard field goal, 5:01. Commanders 45–31. Drive: 10 plays, 60 yards, 2:30.

Top passers

- WAS – Jayden Daniels – 22/31, 299 yards, 2 TD
- DET – Jared Goff – 23/40, 313 yards, TD, 3 INT

Top rushers

- WAS – Brian Robinson Jr. – 15 rushes, 77 yards, 2 TD
- DET – Jahmyr Gibbs – 14 rushes, 105 yards, 2 TD

Top receivers

- WAS – Dyami Brown – 6 receptions, 98 yards
- DET – Amon-Ra St. Brown – 7 receptions, 124 yards

This was the fourth overall playoff meeting between the Lions and Commanders. Washington won each of the three previous playoff meetings, with the most recent meeting being in the 1999 NFC Wild Card, where the then-Washington Redskins defeated the Lions 27–13 in Washington. Washington and Detroit did not meet in the regular season.

A Zane Gonzalez kickoff out of bounds gave the Lions the ball at their own 40-yard line, but they went three-and-out. On Washington's first possession, they failed on a fourth-down trick play involving backup quarterback Marcus Mariota on Detroit's 28-yard line. The Lions scored a touchdown on the very next possession, highlighted by 48 all-purpose yards from running back Jahmyr Gibbs on the possession, who also scored it on the short goal-line run. Zane Gonzalez kicked a field goal on Washington's next possession to carve into Detroit's lead, 7–3.

Just before the end of the first quarter, Jared Goff was sacked and fumbled deep into Washington's territory. This turnover turned into points (and a three-point lead), as Washington's next drive ended in a Brian Robinson Jr. goal-line touchdown, which included the Commanders going for it on fourth down (and succeeding) for the fifth time so far this playoff. A Sam LaPorta one-handed red zone catch from Goff immediately gave the Lions the lead back, 14–10. This was another short-lived lead, as the Commanders scored a minute and 21 seconds later on a Daniels screen pass to Terry McLaurin for 59 yards. The following possession saw the Goff throw a pick-six to Commanders cornerback Quan Martin, extending the Commanders lead, 24–14. On the interception run back, Goff was hit by Frankie Luvu in the head and had to come out of the game. On the next possession, backup quarterback Teddy Bridgewater came into the game and the Lions scored on a Jameson Williams end-around for 61 yards, now trailing just by 3. A few moments later, Daniels hit Dyami Brown for an over the shoulder 38-yard catch, in what was considered a "no-look" catch as safety Kerby Joseph hit Brown's facemask before he could see the ball. Later in the possession, Daniels found veteran tight end Zach Ertz for a 5-yard touchdown to extend their lead back to 10. Goff came back into the game and committed his third turnover on an interception by rookie cornerback Mike Sainristil on a pass intended for Jameson Williams in the endzone. The Commanders took a 31–21 lead on the top-seeded Lions into halftime. Overall, in the second quarter, both teams combined for 42 points, the highest scoring second quarter in NFL postseason history. The teams also combined for 621 yards and seven different players scored a touchdown in the first half. Coincidentally, with Tom Brady announcing the game for Fox, it was the first playoff game to feature 600+ yards from both teams in a half since Super Bowl LII, a game that Brady's Patriots lost.

The Lions opened the scoring with an 11-play touchdown drive, with Gibbs scoring his second running touchdown of the game. On the drive, the referees called a facemask penalty on what would have been a third-down stop, although replay showed David Montgomery shoulder pad was pulled, not his facemask. Additionally, on the drive, off of a pitch from Jared Goff, David Montgomery shoveled a pass to Amon-Ra St. Brown for a 20-yard catch and run to covert a pivotal first down. Washington responded the next possession scoring a touchdown on a 1-yard run from Robinson to extend their lead back to 10, 38–28. A trick play by the Lions on their next possession this time backfired, as Jameson Williams threw an interception on a pass intended for Gibbs; it was an interception by Sainristil, his second of the game. Commanders furthered the lead on a Jeremy McNichols 1-yard run, who was the eighth player in the game to score a touchdown. In the lead-up to the touchdown, the Commanders went for it again on fourth down with Daniels competing a pass to McLaurin on 4th-and-2 from Detroit's 13-yard line. It was their seventh time going for it on fourth down in the playoffs thus far. In the last 4:33 of the game, the Lions could only muster a field goal. Goff threw his third interception of the game (and fourth overall turnover, including his first quarter fumble) on the Lions last possession of the game. It was intercepted by safety Jeremy Chinn for Washington's fourth interception of the game (including wide receiver Williams' interception).

Daniels and the Commanders ran out the clock and they were onto their first NFC Championship Game in 33 years, with a commanding 45–31 upset of the Lions. The 45 points for Washington was the second most they had ever scored in the playoffs, the record score being the 1983 Divisional Round game versus the Los Angeles Rams, where they scored 51 points. With the Commanders' win, the Dallas Cowboys now own the longest active conference championship appearance drought in the NFC, having last made it in 1995 and being the only NFC team yet to make a conference championship appearance in the 21st century. With the defeat, the Lions joined the 2011 Green Bay Packers as the only 15-win team to not win a game in the playoffs.

=== Sunday, January 19, 2025 ===
==== NFC: Philadelphia Eagles 28, Los Angeles Rams 22 ====
Los Angeles Rams vs. Philadelphia Eagles – Game summary

Quarter	1	2	3	4	Total
Rams	7	3	5	7	22
Eagles	13	0	3	12	28

at Lincoln Financial Field, Philadelphia, Pennsylvania

- Date: January 19, 2025
- Game time: 3:02 p.m. EST
- Game weather: Snow, 34 °F (1 °C)
- Game attendance: 69,879
- Referee: Shawn Smith
- TV announcers (NBC): Mike Tirico, Cris Collinsworth, Melissa Stark and Kaylee Hartung
- Recap, Game Book

Game information

First quarter

- PHI – Jalen Hurts 44-yard run (kick failed, wide left), 11:55. Eagles 6–0. Drive: 6 plays, 74 yards, 3:05.
- LAR – Tyler Higbee 4-yard pass from Matthew Stafford (Joshua Karty kick), 6:32. Rams 7–6. Drive: 13 plays, 67 yards, 5:23.
- PHI – Saquon Barkley 62-yard run (Jake Elliott kick), 1:07. Eagles 13–7. Drive: 3 plays, 83 yards, 1:34.

Second quarter

- LAR – Joshua Karty 30-yard field goal, 12:47. Eagles 13–10. Drive: 6 plays, 58 yards, 3:20.

Third quarter

- LAR – Joshua Karty 34-yard field goal, 7:37. Tied 13–13. Drive: 8 plays, 58 yards, 4:22.
- PHI – Jake Elliott 44-yard field goal, 2:19. Eagles 16–13. Drive: 9 plays, 44 yards, 5:18.
- LAR – Jalen Hurts sacked in the end zone by Neville Gallimore for a safety, 0:26. Eagles 16–15.

Fourth quarter

- PHI – Jake Elliott 23-yard field goal, 13:23. Eagles 19–15. Drive: 4 plays, 5 yards, 1:26.
- PHI – Jake Elliott 37-yard field goal, 6:18. Eagles 22–15. Drive: 8 plays, 19 yards, 4:46.
- PHI – Saquon Barkley 78-yard run (kick failed, wide left), 4:36. Eagles 28–15. Drive: 1 play, 78 yards, 0:11.
- LAR – Colby Parkinson 4-yard pass from Matthew Stafford (Joshua Karty kick), 2:48. Eagles 28–22. Drive: 10 plays, 70 yards, 1:48.

Top passers

- LAR – Matthew Stafford – 26/44, 324 yards, 2 TD
- PHI – Jalen Hurts – 15/20, 128 yards

Top rushers

- LAR – Kyren Williams – 19 rushes, 106 yards
- PHI – Saquon Barkley – 26 rushes, 205 yards, 2 TD

Top receivers

- LAR – Puka Nacua – 6 receptions, 97 yards
- PHI – Dallas Goedert – 4 receptions, 56 yards

This was the fourth meeting between the Eagles and Rams in NFL playoff history, with the Rams having won two of the three prior matchups; the then-St. Louis Rams won 29–24 won the most recent playoff meeting in the 2001 NFC Championship Game at the Edward Jones Dome in St. Louis. In the regular season, the Eagles defeated the Rams 37–20 during Week 12 in Los Angeles.

The Eagles and Rams traded touchdowns on their first possessions. The Eagles scored on a 44-yard run from quarterback Jalen Hurts, while the Rams finished their drive off with a pass from Matthew Stafford to tight end Tyler Higbee. The score was not tied due to Jake Elliott's missed extra point. The two teams then matched each other with punts. Late in the first quarter, the Eagles went in front with a 62-yard touchdown run from Saquon Barkley; it was Barkley's third touchdown against the Rams this season, after breaking the Eagles single-game rushing record against them in Week 12. Joshua Karty added a field goal for the Rams on their next possession to cut the Eagles' lead to 13–10. Neither team scored for the rest of the second quarter as the game went into halftime.

With the field now covered in snow, the game became a defense and turnover battle in the second half. In the third quarter, both teams exchanged field goals to keep the Eagles lead to three points. With 26 seconds left in the third quarter, Hurts was sacked for a safety by Rams defensive tackle Neville Gallimore to reduce the deficit to a single point. On the previous possession, Hurts seemed to injure his knee on a sack by Jaylen McCollough.

Now in the fourth quarter, with the weather conditions worsening, the Eagles capitalized on a Kyren Williams fumble that saw the Eagles start at the 10-yard line of the Rams. The Eagles marched the ball to the Los Angeles 1-yard line, but a false start penalty from veteran lineman Lane Johnson on fourth down led to Philadelphia electing to kick the short field goal. On the subsequent drive by the Rams, Stafford lost the ball on a sack which put the Eagles get the ball at the Rams 38-yard line; they drove down to have Elliott deliver a field goal to extend the lead to 22–15. After the Rams punted on a three-and-out, Saquon Barkley broke the game open with a 78-yard touchdown run, his second rush of 70 yards or more against the Rams this season; however, Elliott missed another extra point for the second time of the game. Now trailing 28–15, the Rams went 70 yards in less than two minutes, culminating with a Stafford touchdown pass to Colby Parkinson from 4 yards out to put the score at 28–22 with 2:48 remaining. After forcing a punt, Stafford and the Rams received the ball back with just over two minutes left. They drove the ball down the field, getting to the 13-yard line of Philadelphia with 1:14 to go; however, a Jalen Carter sack of Stafford on third down and an incomplete pass on fourth down gave Philadelphia the win and their second NFC Championship berth in three seasons.

==== AFC: Buffalo Bills 27, Baltimore Ravens 25 ====
Baltimore Ravens vs. Buffalo Bills – Game summary

Quarter	1	2	3	4	Total
Ravens	7	3	9	6	25
Bills	7	14	0	6	27

at Highmark Stadium, Orchard Park, New York

- Date: January 19, 2025
- Game time: 6:41 p.m. EST
- Game weather: Cloudy, 19 °F (−7 °C)
- Game attendance: 70,697
- Referee: Carl Cheffers
- TV announcers (CBS): Jim Nantz, Tony Romo, Tracy Wolfson and Jay Feely
- Recap, Game Book

Game information

First quarter

- BAL – Rashod Bateman 16-yard pass from Lamar Jackson (Justin Tucker kick), 10:40. Ravens 7–0. Drive: 8 plays, 73 yards, 4:20.
- BUF – Ray Davis 1-yard run (Tyler Bass kick), 4:43. Tied 7–7. Drive: 11 plays, 70 yards, 5:57.

Second quarter

- BUF – Josh Allen 1-yard run (Tyler Bass kick), 8:52. Bills 14–7. Drive: 4 plays, 24 yards, 2:13.
- BAL – Justin Tucker 26-yard field goal, 3:43. Bills 14–10. Drive: 9 plays, 57 yards, 5:09.
- BUF – Josh Allen 4-yard run (Tyler Bass kick), 0:16. Bills 21–10. Drive: 9 plays, 70 yards, 3:27.

Third quarter

- BAL – Justin Tucker 47-yard field goal, 9:47. Bills 21–13. Drive: 9 plays, 35 yards, 4:01.
- BAL – Derrick Henry 5-yard run (pass failed), 1:37. Bills 21–19. Drive: 7 plays, 80 yards, 3:44.

Fourth quarter

- BUF – Tyler Bass 51-yard field goal, 12:04. Bills 24–19. Drive: 10 plays, 37 yards, 4:33.
- BUF – Tyler Bass 21-yard field goal, 3:29. Bills 27–19. Drive: 11 plays, 52 yards, 5:12.
- BAL – Isaiah Likely 24-yard pass from Lamar Jackson (pass failed), 1:33. Bills 27–25. Drive: 8 plays, 88 yards, 1:56.

Top passers

- BAL – Lamar Jackson – 18/25, 254 yards, 2 TD, INT
- BUF – Josh Allen – 16/22, 127 yards

Top rushers

- BAL – Derrick Henry – 16 rushes, 84 yards, TD
- BUF – James Cook – 17 rushes, 67 yards

Top receivers

- BAL – Isaiah Likely – 4 receptions, 73 yards, TD
- BUF – Khalil Shakir – 6 receptions, 67 yards

This was the second overall playoff meeting between the Bills and Ravens. In their only other meeting, the Bills won the 2020 AFC Divisional Game, 17–3. In the regular season, the Ravens defeated the Bills 35–10 during Week 4 in Baltimore. This game featured the two favorites for the NFL MVP, Bills quarterback Josh Allen and Ravens quarterback Lamar Jackson.

Before the game, at a press-conference on January 13, Ravens head-coach John Harbaugh, alongside the rest of the press-conference, laughed when a reporter called Buffalo a "city of losers" in reference to a clip he made on his radio show (Note: "They [Buffalo] have two major sports teams just like Baltimore except the big difference is besides they have better chicken wings is they're a city of losers. They've won nothing.") As the Ravens took the field, the Bills played the clip from the radio show over the stadium loud-speakers resulting in a chorus of boos from fans.

The Ravens received to start the game. The teams traded touchdowns on their opening dives, with a 16-yard Jackson pass to Rashod Bateman being followed by a drive that ended with a 1-yard Ray Davis rushing touchdown for the Bills. On the subsequent drive, Jackson threw an interception to Buffalo safety Taylor Rapp; the Bills failed to score and punted after four plays. The Ravens started from their own 9-yard line and drove the ball all the way to the Buffalo 28-yard line but Jackson fumbled the ball when being sacked by Damar Hamlin that saw Von Miller recover the fumble and return it all the way to the Baltimore 24-yard line. Four plays later, Josh Allen scored on a tush push rush to give Buffalo the lead. The Ravens marched the ball down the field on their next drive (getting as close as the 2-yard line) before being stopped on the goal-line, which saw them decide to have Justin Tucker kick a 26-yard field goal to narrow the deficit. The Bills responded by also marching the ball down the field (going 70 yards in 3:27) with Allen again scoring a rushing touchdown on a 4-yard play action draw that saw Buffalo go up 21–10 with 0:16 in the first half.

The Bills received the ball to start the half but punted after three plays. The Ravens drove from their own 36-yard line to the Buffalo 27-yard line but could not get any further and elected to take the field goal by Tucker from 47 yards out to make it 21–13. The Bills continued to struggle, again punting on their next drive. The Ravens went 80 yards in seven plays, scoring off a Derrick Henry 5-yard run; however, the two-point conversion attempt to try and tie the game was batted down by Bills linebacker Matt Milano for an incompletion. Starting at their own 30, the Bills went 37 yards to setup a 51-yard field goal attempt by Tyler Bass to put the score at 24–19 with 12:04 remaining in the fourth quarter. On the next drive, when Jackson completed a pass to tight end Mark Andrews to the 44-yard line of Buffalo, Terrel Bernard forced a fumble that he recovered to give Buffalo the ball. The Bills responded with a grinding drive of 52 yards that took five minutes off the clock that culminated with Bass making a 21-yard field goal (after Buffalo elected to kick on 4th-and-goal from the 2-yard line) with 3:29 remaining to give Buffalo a 27–19 lead. A subsequent penalty on the kick return meant Baltimore started at their own 12-yard line. The Ravens drove down the field quickly, going 88 yards in eight plays that saw Jackson throw a 24-yard pass to Isaiah Likely in the end zone to cut the deficit to two. On the two-point conversion attempt, Jackson threw it to Andrews near the pylon, but Andrews dropped the pass. With 1:33 remaining, the Ravens attempted an onside kick, but Rasul Douglas recovered it for the Bills. Buffalo had one 17-yard running play to burn the last Ravens timeout before kneeling the ball to end the game.

The Ravens outgained the Bills in total yards (416–273) while punting zero times; however, they had three turnovers, while Buffalo had none. With the win, Buffalo will face Kansas City for the fourth time in the last five postseasons in the AFC Championship Game; the last time Buffalo had played in the AFC Championship Game was in 2021 against the Chiefs.

== Conference championships ==
=== Sunday, January 26, 2025 ===
==== NFC: Philadelphia Eagles 55, Washington Commanders 23 ====
Washington Commanders vs. Philadelphia Eagles – Game summary

Quarter	1	2	3	4	Total
Commanders	3	12	8	0	23
Eagles	14	13	7	21	55

at Lincoln Financial Field, Philadelphia, Pennsylvania

- Date: January 26, 2025
- Game time: 3:03 p.m. EST
- Game weather: Cloudy, 40 °F (4 °C)
- Game attendance: 69,879
- Referee: Shawn Hochuli
- TV announcers (Fox): Kevin Burkhardt, Tom Brady, Erin Andrews and Tom Rinaldi
- Recap, Game Book

Game information

First quarter

- WAS – Zane Gonzalez 34-yard field goal, 7:57. Commanders 3–0. Drive: 18 plays, 54 yards, 7:03.
- PHI – Saquon Barkley 60-yard run (Jake Elliott kick), 7:39. Eagles 7–3. Drive: 1 play, 60 yards, 0:18.
- PHI – Saquon Barkley 4-yard run (Jake Elliott kick), 3:43. Eagles 14–3. Drive: 6 plays, 48 yards, 2:02.

Second quarter

- WAS – Zane Gonzalez 46-yard field goal, 14:42. Eagles 14–6. Drive: 10 plays, 45 yards, 4:01.
- WAS – Terry McLaurin 36-yard pass from Jayden Daniels (pass failed), 7:05. Eagles 14–12. Drive: 5 plays, 56 yards, 1:44.
- PHI – Jalen Hurts 1-yard run (run failed), 1:44. Eagles 20–12. Drive: 12 plays, 72 yards, 5:21.
- PHI – A. J. Brown 4-yard pass from Jalen Hurts (Jake Elliott kick), 0:39. Eagles 27–12. Drive: 7 plays, 24 yards, 0:57.
- WAS – Zane Gonzalez 42-yard field goal, 0:02. Eagles 27–15. Drive: 5 plays, 46 yards, 0:37.

Third quarter

- PHI – Jalen Hurts 9-yard run (Jake Elliott kick), 8:58. Eagles 34–15. Drive: 4 plays, 58 yards, 1:49.
- WAS – Jayden Daniels 10-yard run (Jayden Daniels–Olamide Zaccheaus pass), 5:01. Eagles 34–23. Drive: 8 plays, 70 yards, 3:57.

Fourth quarter

- PHI – Jalen Hurts 1-yard run (Jake Elliott kick), 12:24. Eagles 41–23. Drive: 5 plays, 51 yards, 2:58.
- PHI – Saquon Barkley 4-yard run (Jake Elliott kick), 7:58. Eagles 48–23. Drive: 4 plays, 31 yards, 2:21.
- PHI – Will Shipley 2-yard run (Jake Elliott kick), 3:03. Eagles 55–23. Drive: 4 plays, 80 yards, 1:48.

Top passers

- WAS – Jayden Daniels – 29/48, 255 yards, TD, INT
- PHI – Jalen Hurts – 20/28, 246 yards, TD

Top rushers

- WAS – Jayden Daniels – 6 rushes, 48 yards, TD
- PHI – Saquon Barkley – 15 rushes, 118 yards, 3 TD

Top receivers

- WAS – Zach Ertz – 11 receptions, 104 yards
- PHI – A. J. Brown – 6 receptions, 96 yards, TD

This was the second ever playoff meeting between Washington and Philadelphia; their first came in the 1990 NFC Wild Card Game, in which the Redskins defeated the Eagles 20–6 at Veterans Stadium in Philadelphia. In the regular season, the Eagles and Commanders split the series, with the Eagles winning 26–18 in Philadelphia in Week 14 and the Commanders winning 36–33 in Washington in Week 16. This marked the first time that the NFC Championship was a divisional matchup since the Rams and 49ers from the NFC West met in the 2021–22 playoffs and was the first involving NFC East sides since the Giants played the Redskins in 1987.

This was the ninth NFC Championship Game appearance for the Eagles, who came in with a 4–4 record in the round but won their last two appearances in 2017 and 2022. The Commanders made their seventh NFC Championship Game in franchise history and first since their Super Bowl run in 1992; they previously were 5–1 in the round. Commanders quarterback Jayden Daniels was the sixth rookie quarterback to start a conference championship in NFL history, hoping to become the first rookie quarterback to reach and start a Super Bowl, while Jalen Hurts sought to become the first quarterback to return to the Super Bowl after losing in his first Super Bowl start since Jim Kelly.

On their first possession, the Commanders went for it twice on fourth down, their eighth and ninth fourth-down conversion attempts to date in the postseason. Their 18-play, first possession drive would end up on a Zane Gonzalez 34-yard field goal. The Eagles countered with a Saquon Barkley 60-yard touchdown run on their first play of the game; it was Saquon's third postseason run of 60 yards or more.

Washington's next drive stalled when Zack Baun punched the ball out of Dyami Brown's arms after a catch and run; the ball was recovered by Reed Blankenship just before going out of bounds. With the ball on Washington's 48-yard line, the Eagles scored on a touchdown on Barkley 4-yard run with 3:43 left in the first quarter, putting the score at 14–3. The Commanders executed a fake punt on a Tress Way pass to backup tight end Ben Sinnott on their next possession. Their drive would stall, but a Zane Gonzalez 46-yard field goal cut the Eagles' lead to 14–6. The Eagles drove the ball down the field, but a Hurts' sack by Frankie Luvu on 3rd-and-6 moved the ball back to Washington's 36-yard-line; the next play Jake Elliott missed a 54-yard field goal. The Commanders promptly responded, as a few moments later, Terry McLaurin found the endzone after a 36-yard catch-and-run from Jayden Daniels with 7:05 left in the second quarter; they however failed on a two-point conversion that would have tied the score at 14. The Eagles scored a touchdown on their next drive, benefiting from a Hurts to A. J. Brown connection on a 4th-and-5 for 31 yards. Color commentary Tom Brady pointed out that the play should have been a penalty due to Barkley holding a Commanders' defender just before Hurts released the pass. Nevertheless, the Eagles finished off the drive on a Hurts Brotherly Shove play from the 1-yard line. After the play, veteran cornerback Marshon Lattimore was called for unnecessary roughness against A. J. Brown, which caused a short brawl. Instead of going for the extra-point field goal, the Eagles failed on a two-point conversion from the 1-yard line. On the ensuing kickoff, the Eagles recovered their second kickoff fumble of the playoffs. With the ball at Washington's 24-yard line, the Eagles drove the ball to the Commander's 4-yard line before a Hurts to Brown touchdown pass and catch gave the Eagles a 27–12 lead with 0:39 seconds left in the half. Daniels and the Commanders drove down the field, which allowed Gonzalez to kick a 42-yard field goal just before half, leaving the score at 27–15 at halftime. There were no punts in the first half, the first time this has happened in a Conference Championship game since 2003.

On their second possession of the third quarter, the Eagles went up 34–15 on a Jalen Hurts 9-yard run, his second rushing touchdown of the game. The Commanders responded on their next possession with a Daniels 10-yard touchdown run; their successful two-point conversion cut the lead to 34–23. At 2:29 left in the third quarter, Commanders linebacker Frankie Luvu came up with a tackle for loss on a Barkley run on 3rd-and-5, forcing an Eagles punt. On the Commanders' next possession, they suffered their third fumble loss of the game when backup running back Austin Ekeler caught the ball on a short pass, fell down, and loss the ball when he got up due to Oren Burks punching the ball out of his hands.

In the fourth quarter, after a 22-yard run by Barkley, as well as three straight encroachment penalties on Washington's defense (two of which were on Luvu), the Eagles scored a touchdown on a Hurts Brotherly Shove from the 1-yard line, his third rushing touchdown of the game. On their next possession, the Commanders were stopped on fourth down on their own 31-yard line. Pass interference by Jeremy Chinn on tight end Dallas Goedert set up the Eagles to score their sixth touchdown of the game; the 4-yard scoring run from Barkley was his seventh touchdown against the Commanders during the season and extended the Eagles' lead to 48–23. With the game out of reach, backup running back Will Shipley added the Eagles seventh touchdown of the day on 2-yard run with 4:51 remaining in the game. Backup quarterback Kenny Pickett kneeled the ball on the Eagles' next possession to secure the team's fifth Super Bowl appearance in franchise history. The Eagles' 55 points were the most scored by a team in any championship game.

The Eagles offense broke out of their mini-slump in a big way. Quarterback Jalen Hurts threw for 246 yards, the second time since Thanksgiving and his first playoff game since Super Bowl LVII that he passed for over 200 yards. A. J. Brown caught six passes for 96 yards and a touchdown. Tight end Dallas Goedert caught seven passes for 85 yards. Barkley ran for 118 yards on 15 carries with three touchdowns, putting him just 29 yards away behind Terrell Davis' all-time record for combined regular-season and playoff rushing yards in a single season. Hurts added 16 yards on the ground to go along with three touchdowns. Third-string running back Will Shipley also had 77 yards on the ground and a touchdown while also causing a fumble for the Eagles on a kickoff return just before the second half. Altogether, the Eagles broke the record for most rush yards in a NFC Championship Game.

During postgame celebrations in Philadelphia, an 18-year-old Temple student fell from a light pole on Sunday night and died a few days later.

==== AFC: Kansas City Chiefs 32, Buffalo Bills 29 ====
Buffalo Bills vs. Kansas City Chiefs – Game summary

Quarter	1	2	3	4	Total
Bills	3	13	6	7	29
Chiefs	7	14	0	11	32

at Arrowhead Stadium, Kansas City, Missouri

- Date: January 26, 2025
- Game time: 5:40 p.m. CST/6:40 p.m. EST
- Game weather: 31 °F (−1 °C)
- Game attendance: 73,487
- Referee: Clete Blakeman
- TV announcers (CBS): Jim Nantz, Tony Romo, Tracy Wolfson, Evan Washburn and Jay Feely
- Recap, Game Book

Game information

First quarter

- KC – Kareem Hunt 12-yard run (Harrison Butker kick), 8:56. Chiefs 7–0. Drive: 9 plays, 90 yards, 5:05.
- BUF – Tyler Bass 53-yard field goal, 3:45. Chiefs 7–3. Drive: 10 plays, 35 yards, 5:11.

Second quarter

- BUF – James Cook 6-yard run (Tyler Bass kick), 10:25. Bills 10–7. Drive: 10 plays, 72 yards, 5:32.
- KC – Xavier Worthy 11-yard pass from Patrick Mahomes (Harrison Butker kick), 4:13. Chiefs 14–10. Drive: 11 plays, 70 yards, 6:12.
- KC – Patrick Mahomes 1-yard run (Harrison Butker kick), 1:55. Chiefs 21–10. Drive: 6 plays, 34 yards, 1:44.
- BUF – Mack Hollins 34-yard pass from Josh Allen (run failed), 0:23. Chiefs 21–16. Drive: 7 plays, 73 yards, 1:32.

Third quarter

- BUF – James Cook 1-yard run (pass failed), 2:56. Bills 22–21. Drive: 12 plays, 80 yards, 7:05.

Fourth quarter

- KC – Patrick Mahomes 10-yard run (Patrick Mahomes–Justin Watson pass), 10:14. Chiefs 29–22. Drive: 5 plays, 59 yards, 2:41.
- BUF – Curtis Samuel 4-yard pass from Josh Allen (Tyler Bass kick), 6:15. Tied 29–29. Drive: 9 plays, 70 yards, 3:59.
- KC – Harrison Butker 35-yard field goal, 3:33. Chiefs 32–29. Drive: 8 plays, 51 yards, 2:42.

Top passers

- BUF – Josh Allen – 22/34, 237 yards, 2 TD
- KC – Patrick Mahomes – 18/26, 245 yards, TD

Top rushers

- BUF – James Cook – 13 rushes, 85 yards, 2 TD
- KC – Kareem Hunt – 17 rushes, 64 yards, TD

Top receivers

- BUF – Mack Hollins – 3 receptions, 73 yards, TD
- KC – Xavier Worthy – 6 receptions, 85 yards, TD

This was the seventh playoff meeting between the Bills and Chiefs, and the fourth in five seasons. The Chiefs lead the historical playoff series 4–2, including the 2021 AFC Divisional Game, where the Chiefs offense orchestrated a game-tying drive in the final 13 seconds of regulation. The most recent playoff meeting came in the 2023 AFC Divisional Game, which the Chiefs won 27–24 in Buffalo en route to winning Super Bowl LVIII after Bills kicker Tyler Bass missed a potential game-tying field goal wide right in the final two minutes of regulation. The last conference championship meeting was the 2020 AFC Championship game, which the Chiefs won 38–24. In the regular season, the Bills defeated the Chiefs 30–21 in Buffalo during Week 11.

This was the seventh straight AFC Championship Game appearance (and eighth overall) for the Chiefs. The eighth team to win back-to-back Super Bowls, they became the fourth team to reach the Super Bowl in three consecutive seasons, after the 1971–1973 Miami Dolphins, 1991–1993 Buffalo Bills, and 2016–2018 New England Patriots; however, Kansas City is the first team to win two straight Super Bowls and then return for a third consecutive year, as the Dolphins lost their first, the Patriots their second, and the Bills all three. This is the seventh overall AFC Championship Game appearance for the Bills, who have not won a conference since their four consecutive AFC Championship Game victories from 1991 to 1994, one of which (1993) was against the Chiefs; that game is also the last time they beat the Chiefs in the playoffs.

The broadcast on CBS drew an AFC Championship Game record viewing audience of 57.4 million viewers.

The Chiefs started off the scoring via a Kareem Hunt 12-yard run on their first possession. On the next possession, Bills' kicker Tyler Bass connected on a 55-yard field goal, the longest postseason kick in the history of Arrowhead Stadium. With 57 seconds left in the first quarter, Patrick Mahomes fumbled on Buffalo's 23-yard line; it was Kansas City's first offensive turnover since Week 11, which coincidentally came against Buffalo. The Bills took the momentum and scored on their next possession at in the second quarter via a James Cook 6-yard run, his 20th total touchdown (regular season and playoffs) of the season. The Chiefs responded with an eleven-play drive on a Mahomes touchdown pass to rookie Xavier Worthy, taking the lead, 14–10. The Bills went three-and-out and a Nikko Remigio 41-yard punt return set up the Chiefs on the Bills 29-yard line. Then, Xavier Worthy caught a questionable jump ball catch on 3rd-and-5, taking the ball to Buffalo's 3-yard line. With 1:55 left in the half, Mahomes ran it in on a rollout to the right from Buffalo's 1-yard line to go up 21–10. On the Bills next possession, a Mack Hollins 34-yard pass from Josh Allen cut the lead to one score. The Bills tried to cut the lead to three points by attempting a two-point conversion, but receiver Curtis Samuel was stopped short of the goal line. The game went into halftime with Kansas City holding a 21–16 lead.

Kansas City's first drive out of halftime stalled on a Matt Milano sack of Mahomes on 3rd-and-11 on Buffalo's 37-yard line. Buffalo proceeded to take the ball down the field and scored on a James Cook 1-yard run on 4th-and-goal, taking the lead, 22–21. Bass made his extra point attempt, but Chiefs safety Justin Reid was called for offside, having come over the line of scrimmage before the ball was snapped in an attempt to block the kick. The Bills had the choice of declining the penalty, which would've resulted in a successful extra point, or accepting the penalty, which would allow them to attempt another two-point conversion, but from the one-yard line instead of the two-yard line due to the penalty. The Bills accepted the penalty, and their second two-point conversion attempt of the game, a QB sneak by Allen, was unsuccessful. On the ensuing possession, the Bills defense held the Chiefs to a punt, giving Buffalo the opportunity to possibly go up by two possessions. However, the drive ended with no score after the final two plays, and in particular Josh Allen's fourth-and-inches quarterback sneak, were controversially ruled short of the line to gain, turning the ball over to the Chiefs on Kansas City's 41-yard line with 13:01 left to play.

The Chiefs responded to it with a five-play, 59-yard touchdown drive capped off by a 10-yard Mahomes run, his second rushing touchdown of the game and third overall in the postseason; on the two-point conversion, Mahomes found Justin Watson at the back of the endzone to take the lead 29–22. The Bills then marched down the field on a nine-play, 70-yard touchdown drive, culminating in a four-yard touchdown pass from Allen to Samuel on 4th-and-goal, and after Bass made the extra point, the score was tied at 29 with 6:15 left in the game. The Chiefs' next drive stalled on Buffalo's 17-yard line, with the Bills holding them to a Harrison Butker field goal, giving the Chiefs a 32–29 lead with 3:33 left to play. The Bills got the ball back, and needed to either kick a field goal to tie the game or score a touchdown to take the lead in order to avoid a fourth consecutive playoff loss to the Chiefs. However, the Bills were only able to get one first down, a Josh Allen 13-yard scramble on 2nd-and-11 from the Buffalo 29-yard line. After the scramble, first and second down resulted in incompletions before Allen connected with Amari Cooper for five yards on 3rd-and-10, setting up a do-or-die 4th-and-5 for the Bills. On the play, Kansas City defensive coordinator Steve Spagnuolo chose to heavily blitz Allen, causing him to heave the ball to Dalton Kincaid. The ball was catchable, but Kincaid misread the pass and dropped it while sliding. Buffalo then used a timeout after each play the Chiefs ran in an effort to get the ball back, but Kansas City was able to get a first down and kneel out the clock to secure their berth in Super Bowl LIX.

In the game, star quarterbacks Josh Allen and Patrick Mahomes recorded similar statistics: Allen went 22–34 with 237 yards passing and two passing touchdowns, while Mahomes went 18–26 for 245 yards and one touchdown. On the ground, Allen went for 39 yards on 11 carries, while Mahomes had 43 yards on 11 carries with two scrambling touchdowns. In nine composite matchups between the Chiefs and Bills (regular season and playoffs), Mahomes's team now has outscored Allen's 245–240. In addition, with the AFC Championship Game win, Mahomes now has 17 postseason wins, breaking a tie with Joe Montana for the second-most wins by a quarterback in playoff history and trailing only Tom Brady and his 35 wins.

The controversial calls against the Bills were met with intense backlash, from both fans and media alike, where a petition was launched calling for a boycott of the NFL, in addition to that season's Super Bowl. The petitioner accused the NFL of favoritism of the Kansas City Chiefs, while also calling for the league to introduce "training and accountability mechanisms" for officials in response to said accusation.

During the second quarter, officials ruled that Chiefs wide receiver Xavier Worthy made a completed catch over Bills safety Cole Bishop. While the ruling on the field would stand following a challenge from Bills head coach Sean McDermott, video replay had shown that the ball hit the ground. Some commentators also spotted that Bishop had a hand on the ball, resulting in a simultaneous possession. The official NFL rulebook states:

If a pass is caught simultaneously by two eligible opponents, and both players retain it, the ball belongs to the passers. It is not a simultaneous catch if a player gains control first and an opponent subsequently gains joint control. If the ball is muffed after simultaneous touching by two such players, all the players of the passing team become eligible to catch the loose ball.

— Official Playing Rules of the National Football League, Rule 8, Section 3, Article 4

Early in the fourth quarter, CBS rules analyst Gene Steratore stated that he believed Josh Allen got the first down on a 4th down quarterback sneak "by about a third of the football", at the Chiefs' 40-yard line. This opinion was also echoed by announcer Jim Nantz. However, Allen was ruled short of a first down, resulting in a turnover on downs.

Rules analyst and former NFL Vice President of Officiating, Dean Blandino, told TMZ in an interview, that he believed that the officials had incorrectly ruled Allen short on his 4th down sneak:

When I watched it live, I really did. I thought he made the big line. It was close. You know, when you watch the two officials, one official was coming in from the top. Looked like that official had the spot at the line to gain. The other official had it just short. When you have those situations, really, who does the ball open up to? Does one official defer to the other? Thought they both had fairly decent looks at it. They went with the spot that was short. And once you get it that close it's gonna be tough to overturn.

— Dean Blandino

An article from Sports Illustrated also noted the questionable ball spotting during Buffalo's offensive drives, accusing the officiating crew of moving the Bills behind the first down marker. In a video posted on social media, CBS announcers Jim Nantz and Tony Romo had called first downs for Buffalo in real-time, with the officials suddenly spotting the ball shorter than when the play had officially ended. On the Bills' final possession of the game, Allen threw an incomplete pass to tight end Dalton Kincaid that was dropped. A flag had been immediately thrown to indicate defensive pass interference on the Chiefs, but the flag was immediately picked up by the officials, which was also another discussion point among fans.

According to Mike Florio of NBC Sports, referee Clete Blakeman did not talk to reporters following the conclusion of the game. As a result, a pool report was not submitted.

During his Super Bowl press conference in New Orleans, NFL Commissioner Roger Goodell called the supposed "conspiracy theories" surrounding favoritism of the Chiefs as a "ridiculous theory", but stated that he understood why fans could feel that way, citing passion for the game as a reason. Goodell defended the officiating crews in the league, calling them "an outstanding group of men and women dedicated to the game."

The NFL Referee Association's executive director, Scott Green, also echoed Goodell's opinion, adding that officiating crews do not work the same team more than twice in the regular season. Green also added that it was "insulting and preposterous" to imply that the league's officials (consisting of 17 crews and 138 officials in total) were colluding to assist the Chiefs.

== Super Bowl LIX: Philadelphia Eagles 40, Kansas City Chiefs 22 ==
Super Bowl LIX – Kansas City Chiefs vs. Philadelphia Eagles – Game summary

Quarter	1	2	3	4	Total
Chiefs	0	0	6	16	22
Eagles	7	17	10	6	40

at Caesars Superdome, New Orleans, Louisiana

- Date: February 9, 2025
- Game time: 5:41 p.m. CST/6:41 p.m. EST
- Game weather: None (indoor stadium)
- Game attendance: 65,719
- Referee: Ronald Torbert
- TV announcers (Fox): Kevin Burkhardt, Tom Brady, Erin Andrews and Tom Rinaldi
- Recap, Game Book

Game information

First quarter

- PHI – Jalen Hurts 1-yard run (Jake Elliott kick), 6:15. Eagles 7–0. Drive: 7 plays, 69 yards, 3:25.

Second quarter

- PHI – Jake Elliott 48-yard field goal, 8:38. Eagles 10–0. Drive: 7 plays, 27 yards, 3:59.
- PHI – Cooper DeJean 38-yard interception return (Jake Elliott kick), 7:03. Eagles 17–0.
- PHI – A. J. Brown 12-yard pass from Jalen Hurts (Jake Elliott kick), 1:35. Eagles 24–0. Drive: 2 plays, 14 yards, 0:10.

Third quarter

- PHI – Jake Elliott 29-yard field goal, 5:18. Eagles 27–0. Drive: 12 plays, 69 yards, 6:42.
- PHI – DeVonta Smith 46-yard pass from Jalen Hurts (Jake Elliott kick), 2:40. Eagles 34–0. Drive: 1 play, 46 yards, 0:07.
- KC – Xavier Worthy 24-yard pass from Patrick Mahomes (pass failed), 0:34. Eagles 34–6. Drive: 5 plays, 90 yards, 2:06.

Fourth quarter

- PHI – Jake Elliott 48-yard field goal, 9:51. Eagles 37–6. Drive: 10 plays, 40 yards, 5:43.
- PHI – Jake Elliott 50-yard field goal, 8:01. Eagles 40–6. Drive: 4 plays, 1 yard, 1:41.
- KC – DeAndre Hopkins 7-yard pass from Patrick Mahomes (Patrick Mahomes–Justin Watson pass), 2:54. Eagles 40–14. Drive: 12 plays, 75 yards, 5:07.
- KC – Xavier Worthy 50-yard pass from Patrick Mahomes (Patrick Mahomes–DeAndre Hopkins pass), 1:48. Eagles 40–22. Drive: 1 play, 50 yards, 0:08.

Top passers

- KC – Patrick Mahomes – 21/32, 257 yards, 3 TD, 2 INT
- PHI – Jalen Hurts – 17/22, 221 yards, 2 TD, INT

Top rushers

- KC – Patrick Mahomes – 4 rushes, 25 yards
- PHI – Jalen Hurts – 11 rushes, 72 yards, TD

Top receivers

- KC – Xavier Worthy – 8 receptions, 157 yards, 2 TD
- PHI – DeVonta Smith – 4 receptions, 69 yards, TD

This was the second time the Eagles and the Chiefs met in the Super Bowl, just two years after their first in Super Bowl LVII. Philadelphia outperformed Kansas City on both sides of the ball to win their second Super Bowl in franchise history by a score of 40–22. The game was 40–6 before the Chiefs mustered up two scoring drives near the end of the game. Philadelphia rookie cornerback Cooper DeJean intercepted a pass from Mahomes and returned it for a touchdown, becoming the second rookie in Super Bowl history to achieve a pick-six, after Reggie Phillips in Super Bowl XX which was also played at the Superdome, as well as the first player in Super Bowl history to score a touchdown on his birthday. Quarterback Jalen Hurts won Super Bowl MVP.

== Media ==
=== United States ===
Broadcasting rights of the Wild Card round were split between the NFL's existing broadcasters: CBS, Fox, NBC, ESPN and Amazon Prime Video. CBS had two games, an AFC contest which it is guaranteed annually, as well as a second game as part of a rotation with Fox and NBC since 2020. Nickelodeon had an alternative broadcast of CBS' Saturday Wild Card game. Fox was also guaranteed an NFC Wild Card game annually. NBC's Wild Card game aired on Sunday night, while ESPN's Wild Card game aired on Monday night, with a simulcast on ABC and the Manningcast on ESPN2. This was the first season Prime Video exclusively streamed a Wild Card game, purchasing the rights to the game that Peacock streamed exclusively last season. Prime Video had previously simulcast one of CBS's Wild Card games in 2020–21 and 2021–22.

This was the second season that ESPN/ABC, Fox, CBS and NBC each aired one divisional playoff game.

CBS and Fox had the AFC Championship Game and NFC Championship Game, respectively.

Fox televised Super Bowl LIX under the annual rotation of Super Bowl broadcasters.

ESPN Deportes, Fox Deportes and Universo/Telemundo air all ESPN/ABC, Fox and NBC games in Spanish respectively. For the first time, Fox Deportes and Telemundo shared the Spanish rights to the Super Bowl.

Peacock, Paramount+ and ESPN+ streamed all NBC, CBS and ESPN/ABC games, respectively, while Fox-owned Tubi streamed Super Bowl LIX. Amazon streamed its games in multiple feeds on Twitch on non television devices. The league's streaming service NFL+ stream every postseason game on mobile devices only, regardless of broadcaster.

=== International ===
This was DAZN's second year of a ten-year agreement to distribute the NFL Game Pass International service, offering live NFL playoff games.

Specific country rights include:

- Australia: ESPN
- Bosnia and Herzegovina, Croatia, Montenegro, North Macedonia, Serbia, Slovenia: Arena Sport
- Brazil: ESPN/RedeTV!
- Canada: TSN/CTV
- Denmark: TV 2
- Finland/Sweden: TV4
- France: beIN Sports, W9
- Germany: RTL
- Japan: Nippon TV
- Mexico: Canal 5, ESPN/Star+, Fox Sports
- New Zealand: TVNZ
- Norway: VGTV
- South Korea: Coupang Play
- Spain: Movistar Deportes
- Taiwan: ELTA Sports
- Thailand: TrueVisions
- United Kingdom: Sky Sports
