= NFL Network Exclusive Game Series =

NFL broadcasts carried by NFL Network

- Former NFL Network logo for its exclusive package of games used from 2022 to 2025.
- Also known as: Saturday Night Football (2006–2008); Thursday Night Special (2016); Thursday Night Football: Saturday Edition (2014–2015); NFL Network Special (2016–2022); NFL on ESPN (2026-present)
- Genre: American football game telecasts
- Presented by: List of NFL Network Exclusive Game Series broadcasters
- Opening theme: NFL GameDay theme (2006–2025) "Heavy Action" by Johnny Pearson (2026–present)
- Ending theme: Same as opening
- Country of origin: United States
- Original language: English
- No. of seasons: 21 (through 2026 season)
- No. of episodes: 7 per season

Production
- Production locations: Various NFL stadiums (game telecasts); Hollywood Park; Inglewood, California, U.S. (pre-game, halftime and post-game shows)
- Camera setup: Multi-camera
- Running time: 210 minutes or until game ends (inc. adverts)
- Production companies: NFL Network (2006–2013, 2022–2025); CBS Sports (2014–17, 2021); NBC Sports (2016–2017); Fox Sports (2018–2021); ESPN (2026–present)

Original release
- Network: NFL Network
- Release: December 16, 2006 – present

Related
- NFL on ABC; NFL on ESPN; Monday Night Countdown; Monday Night Football

The NFL Network Exclusive Game Series is the former blanket title used for broadcasts of National Football League (NFL) games aired by NFL Network. The package consists of at least seven games per-season, As of the which—as of the 2022 NFL season—consists primarily of NFL International Series games played in a Sunday morning (U.S. time) window, and one or more late-season games.

The games were originally introduced in the 2006 season as Saturday Night Football, airing as part of the new Thursday Night Football package which debuted that season (with the Thursday and Saturday games collectively branded as the Run to the Playoffs). Beginning in 2009, after most of the Saturday games were replaced by Thursday games starting earlier in the season, all games in the package were branded as a "special edition" of Thursday Night Football or a variant thereof, regardless of the day on which the game aired. By 2017, the schedule-agnostic branding NFL Network Special was introduced. The branding NFL Christmas Special was also used for Christmas Day games in the TNF package, some of which having fallen into this segment of the package.

In the 2022 season, Thursday Night Football moved exclusively to Amazon Prime Video. As per NFL Network's carriage agreements, the channel continues to carry at least seven exclusive games per-season, consisting mainly of international games and late-season Saturday games, with the Thursday Night Football-centric branding being dropped and replaced by individual brands for each game (such as Saturday Showdown for the late-season tripleheader). In the 2026 season, ESPN acquired the rights to the package as part of its acquisition of NFL Network, with the games becoming NFL on ESPN telecasts, and ESPN replacing four of the games from the package with games from its existing contract that were previously carried by ABC or ESPN+.

As with all league games carried by a cable network or streaming provider, each game is syndicated to a local broadcast station (or two stations in some cases) in the markets of the two teams, per NFL broadcast rules.

== Background ==
=== Prior to 2017 ===
NFL Network debuted Thursday Night Football on November 23, 2006, with the Kansas City Chiefs handing the visiting Denver Broncos a 19–10 Thanksgiving defeat. As part of this package, three games aired on Saturday nights, which were accordingly branded as Saturday Night Football (not to be confused with ESPN/ABC's college football telecasts of the same name, which ESPN holds a trademark in relation to), with the package as a whole being promoted as the Run to the Playoffs. This format carried over to the 2007 season. Saturday games can only occur in the final weeks of the season, as the Sports Broadcasting Act of 1961, requires blackouts of professional football games—held on Friday evenings or Saturdays from mid-September through mid-December—on television stations within 75 miles (121 km) of the venue of a college or high school football game.

Starting in 2008, NFL Network eliminated all but one of the Saturday night games and started their Thursday night package three weeks earlier. In the following season, all references to Saturday Night Football were dropped, with the entire package now being branded as Thursday Night Football, and non-Thursday games being referred to as a "special edition" of Thursday Night Football.

On October 6, 2013, NFL Network aired a Sunday prime time game featuring the San Diego Chargers at the Oakland Raiders with a rare 8:35 p.m. PT (11:35 p.m. ET) kickoff. The game had been rescheduled, since the Oakland Coliseum needed time to be converted back to its football configuration after an Oakland Athletics Division Series game the previous night. CBS commentators Ian Eagle and Dan Fouts remained assigned to the game.

Beginning in 2014, the Thursday Night Football package was sub-licensed to one or more of the NFL's broadcast partners, who produced all games on behalf of NFL Network, and could simulcast selected games in the package on broadcast television. These, by extension, included the non-Thursday games of the package, which were in turn produced by CBS (with some later produced by NBC beginning in 2016). These games are intended to satisfy NFL Network's carriage agreements, which require that a quota of exclusive games be broadcast by the channel each season, while still allowing some of the games to be simulcast on network television as well.

In 2014, CBS used the branding Thursday Night Football: Saturday Edition for these games—a branding scheme that was especially considered a misnomer when used for a game aired on a Saturday afternoon. By 2016, the games had begun to carry the on-air branding Thursday Night Special (albeit with some fleeting references to Thursday Night Football or TNF still present in on-air graphics), with Christmas Day games assigned to the Thursday Night Football package accordingly using the branding NFL Christmas Special.

=== 2017–2021 ===
By the 2017 season, the branding NFL Network Special was adopted for non-Thursday TNF games exclusive to NFL Network. The games continued to have similar productions to games aired under the Thursday Night Football title, but with their on-air graphics only containing NFL Network branding (rather than being co-branded with the logos of both NFL Network and the host broadcaster).

Beginning in 2018, most NFL Network Special games became Fox productions as part of its new rights to Thursday Night Football. An exception was an NFL London Game on October 10, 2021, which was instead produced by CBS.

=== 2022–present ===
Amazon Prime Video holds rights to Thursday Night Football beginning in the 2022 NFL season. There will still be a package of exclusive games on NFL Network, generally consisting of international games airing at 9:30 a.m. ET, and late-season Saturday games. NFL Network now branded the broadcasts as its "exclusive game series", branding the late-season Saturday games with distinct titles such as Saturday Showdown (late-season Saturday games), and the Holiday Classic (Christmas Eve/Day games). Production of the games was taken back in-house, and a new graphics package by Two Fresh Creative replaced the Thursday Night Football-centric branding used prior.

In Week 16 of 2023, NFL Network added a Sunday night game on Christmas Eve in lieu of usual broadcaster NBC (which aired an afternoon game that Saturday before on December 23), due to NBC producing a Peacock-exclusive game later that same day.

==== 2026: Acquisition by ESPN ====
With its acquisition of NFL Media ahead of the 2026 season, ESPN acquired the rights to the games carried by NFL Network. Contractually, ESPN reallocated four of the national games from its existing NFL rights (including three games formerly aired by ABC as part of "split" weeks of Monday Night Football, and a streaming-exclusive game on ESPN+) to the package carried by NFL Network, and renewed the package through at least 2032 with no ability for the league to opt out. These moves ensure that NFL Network will meet its contractual obligations with television providers to carry at least seven exclusive games per-season, and assure that ESPN will retain rights to these games in the event that the NFL were to invoke the opt-out clauses in its current agreements. The four affected games were returned to the league, with the NFL reselling them as standalone national games to its existing broadcast partners.

NFL Network's package would remain functionally similar to past seasons, but are now produced by ESPN under the NFL on ESPN branding (including a new on-air graphics package shared with Monday Night Football), and feature a new #2 commentary team consisting of former Arizona Cardinals radio announcer Dave Pasch, Kurt Warner, and Jason Kelce.

== Personal ==
=== Announcers ===
==== Play-by-play ====
- Greg Gumbel (2017 and 2021)
- Mike Tirico (2017–2019)
- Rich Eisen (2018–2019 and 2022–2025)
- Curt Menefee (2018)
- Kevin Burkhardt (2019 and 2021)
- Adam Amin (2020 and 2025)
- Joe Davis (2020–2021 and 2025)
- Kevin Kugler (2022)
- Noah Eagle (2022)
- Chris Rose (2023–2024)
- Kevin Harlan (2023–2024)
- Kenny Albert (2025)
- Dave Pasch (2026–present)
- Bob Wischusen (2026–present)

==== Color ====
- Trent Green (2017 and 2023–2024)
- Kurt Warner (2017–present)
- Michael Irvin (2018–2019 and 2022)
- Steve Mariucci (2018–2019 and 2022)
- Nate Burleson (2018–2019 and 2022)
- Joe Thomas (2019 and 2024)
- Charles Davis (2019)
- Mark Schlereth (2020)
- Adam Archuleta (2021)
- Greg Olsen (2021 and 2025)
- Mark Sanchez (2022)
- Jason McCourty (2023)
- Dan Orlovsky (2023)
- Ross Tucker (2024)
- Jonathan Vilma (2025)
- Jason Kelce (2026-present)
- Louis Riddick (2026–present)

==== Reporters ====
- Jamie Erdahl (2017 and 2022–2025)
- Heather Cox (2017)
- Melissa Stark (2018–2021)
- Peter Schrager (2018–2019, 2021–2022 and 2026–present)
- Pam Oliver (2019, 2021 and 2025)
- Lindsay Czarniak (2020 and 2022)
- A.J. Ross (2021)
- Steve Wyche (2021–2024)
- Laura Okmin (2022)
- Stacey Dales (2022–2025)
- Sara Walsh (2022–2023 and 2025)
- Tom Pelissero (2022)
- Allison Williams (2022)
- Melanie Collins (2023–2024)
- James Palmer (2023)
- Sherree Burruss (2023)
- Kristina Pink (2025)
- Molly McGrath (2026–present)

== See also ==
- NFL on Fox
- NFL on CBS
- NFL on NBC
- NBC Sunday Night Football
- Monday Night Football
- MLB Network Showcase
- NHL Network Showcase
