= NFL on ESPN =

U.S. television series

- Former logo used from 2023 to 2025
- Also known as: Sunday Night Football; (1987–2006); Monday Night Countdown; (1993–present); Monday Night Football; (2006–present); Manningcast; (2021–present); NFL Network Exclusive Game Series (2026–present)
- Genre: American football game telecasts
- Directed by: Chip Dean (2006–2018); Jimmy Platt (2019–2022); Derek Mobley (2023–2024); Artie Kempner (2025–present)
- Presented by: Commentators: Joe Buck (play-by-play); Troy Aikman (color commentator); Peyton Manning and Eli Manning (ESPN2); Reporters: Lisa Salters (sideline); Laura Rutledge (sideline); Rules analyst: Russell Yurk; Studio: Scott Van Pelt; Chris Berman; Jason McCourty; Pat McAfee; Jason Kelce; Marcus Spears
- Theme music composer: "Heavy Action" by Johnny Pearson (1998–2000 and 2006–present)
- Opening theme: "All My Rowdy Friends Are Here on Monday Night" by Hank Williams Jr. (2006–2011 and 2017–2019); "Rip It Up" by Little Richard feat. Butcher Brown (2019–2021); In the Air Tonight by Phil Collins feat. Chris Stapleton, Cindy Blackman Santana and Snoop Dogg (2023–2025); "In the Air Tonight" by Phil Collins feat. Chris Stapleton, Cindy Blackman Santana and Ludacris (2026–present)
- Country of origin: United States
- Original language: English
- No. of seasons: 40 (through 2026 season)

Production
- Executive producer: Norby Williamson (2006–2024)
- Producers: Steve Ackels; Roger Lewin; Jay Rothman; Lisa Salters
- Production locations: Various NFL stadiums (game telecasts); ESPN Headquarters Bristol, Connecticut (pre-game, halftime and post-game shows); ABC and ESPN Studio 7 Hudson Square, Manhattan, New York City (alternate pre-game, halftime and post-game shows)
- Camera setup: Multi-camera
- Running time: 210 minutes or until game ends (inc. adverts)
- Production company: ESPN LLC

Original release
- Network: ESPN
- Release: November 8, 1987 – present
- Network: ABC
- Release: January 9, 2016 – present
- Network: ESPN2
- Release: September 13, 2021 – present
- Network: ESPN+
- Release: September 11, 2023 – January 13, 2025
- Network: Disney+
- Release: December 9, 2024
- Network: NFL Network
- Release: September 14, 2026 – present

Related
- NFL on ABC; Football Sunday on ESPN Radio; Sunday NFL Countdown; NFL Primetime

The NFL on ESPN is an American presentation of the National Football League (NFL) games produced by ESPN, and shown on its various platforms including ESPN itself, the ABC television network, and the ESPN DTC streaming service.

National television broadcasts of the National Football League (NFL) first aired on ESPN in 1980, when the network broadcast the 1980 NFL draft. ESPN did not air live NFL games until 1987, when it acquired the rights to Sunday Night Football. In 2006, ESPN lost the rights to Sunday Night Football and began airing Monday Night Football (MNF) instead. Under its current broadcasting deals lasting through 2033, and amended in 2026, ESPN produces MNF throughout the regular season, a Week 18 Saturday doubleheader, and a package of seven games aired by NFL Network (including five International Series games and a Week 16 Saturday doubleheader), with selected MNF games and the Week 18 doubleheader simulcast by ABC. ESPN/ABC also air one Wild Card round playoff game, one Divisional round playoff game, and the Super Bowl in 2027 and 2031.

ESPN also produces studio programming aired across its networks, including the weekday NFL Live, the pre-game shows Monday Night Countdown and Sunday NFL Countdown, NFL Primetime, and NFL Matchup. In 2026, ESPN also acquired NFL Network from the league.

Former NFL commissioner Paul Tagliabue credits ESPN with raising the "profile" of the league, by turning "a potential six- or seven-hour television experience into a twelve-hour television experience," factoring in both the network's pregame show Sunday NFL Countdown and Sunday Night Football.

== Overview ==
In 1979, several months after the founding of ESPN, then ESPN President Chet Simmons asked the NFL if ESPN could air the NFL draft. NFL commissioner Pete Rozelle, despite questions about viewership potential, granted ESPN the rights. The first draft ESPN aired was in 1980. Bob Ley hosted the initial coverage from Bristol, Connecticut. Howard Balzer, Upton Bell and Vince Papale joined Ley as studio analysts while Joe Thomas and four reporters were on site at the NFL Draft in New York City. Despite ESPN only reaching 4 million homes at the time, the NFL considered the initial NFL Draft broadcast a success and ESPN has aired the NFL Draft every year since. In 1988, the NFL moved the draft from weekdays to the weekend and ESPN's ratings of the coverage improved dramatically.

=== Sunday Night Football (1987–2005) ===
As part of its new television package in 1987, the NFL granted ESPN the rights to air a series of Sunday night games, which were to air over the second half of the regular season. The NFL thus became the last major North American professional sports league to begin airing its games on cable television. However, the games were typically simulcast on regular over-the-air television stations in each participating team's local market, so that households without cable television could still see the telecasts of their local team. While ABC had been airing occasional Sunday night NFL games (usually one per season) under its Monday Night Football banner since 1978, the concept of playing a regular series of Sunday night professional football games on ESPN was originally a concept designed for the United States Football League (USFL). As part of the abortive 1986 USFL season, ESPN was to carry a weekly Sunday night game throughout the fall season.

As part of the league's television contract renewal with ABC in 1989, ABC was awarded the television rights to Super Bowl XXV and Super Bowl XXIX, and the first round of NFL playoffs. The Monday Night Football announcing team anchored the telecasts, except for the first of two Wild Card Playoff games, in which ESPN's Sunday Night NFL crew of Mike Patrick and Joe Theismann presided over that telecast. However, the original crew for one of the two Wild Card Playoff games from 1990 to 1995 consisted of Brent Musburger and Dick Vermeil (both of whom did college football broadcasts for ABC during those two seasons).

Following The Walt Disney Company's purchase of both ESPN and ABC in 1996, the two networks' sports departments merged in 1997. Beginning with the 1997 season, the ESPN Sunday Night Football crew called the first Monday Night Football game of the season on ABC, with the ABC Monday Night Football crew calling the second game. ESPN provided wraparound studio programming, with part of the pre and postgame airing on ABC, and ESPN's Ron Jaworski often appeared from the studio for extra analysis during the first game. This arrangement lasted from 1997 through 2005, except for 2002 when ESPN and ABC's college football crew did the early game. Super Bowls on ABC in this period were treated as ESPN events.

In 2003, ABC and the NFL dropped the Monday Night Football game for the final week of the regular season. The move, which had been in effect for the first eight years of the broadcast (1970–1977), was the result of declining ratings, as well as problems involved for potential playoff teams, as there was a potential of only four days rest between their final regular season game and first-round playoff game. ABC replaced the telecast with an opening weekend Thursday night game, and in exchange ESPN got a Saturday night game on the final weekend.

=== Monday Night Football (2006–present) ===
After the 2005 season, ESPN ended this package in favor of picking up the broadcast rights to Monday Night Football from ABC. NBC picked up the rights to ESPN's Sunday night games. To replace Sunday Night Football ESPN moved its late-season Sunday Night Baseball broadcasts back to the network and replaced most of the rest of the open weeks with other sports telecasts.

As part of their 2011 rights agreement, ESPN was given the exclusive rights to the Pro Bowl from 2015 through 2022. Since 2018, the game has been simulcast on ABC.

On April 22, 2014, the NFL announced that it had exercised an option in ESPN's recent contract extension for Monday Night Football rights to air a first-round Wild Card playoff game on the channel after the conclusion of the 2014 season. This was the first (and only) time that an NFL playoff game was ever broadcast exclusively on cable television in the United States, in lieu of any of the league's broadcast network partners. The MNF broadcast team of Mike Tirico, Jon Gruden and sideline reporter Lisa Salters called the game, the first of the 2014–15 NFL playoffs. The NFC South Champion Carolina Panthers defeated the Arizona Cardinals 27–16. As with all MNF games, the matchup was simulcast on local affiliates WJZY (a Fox affiliate) in Charlotte and KASW (a CW affiliate) in Phoenix. This was because of the NFL's rule that requires local affiliates to allow viewers over-the-air access to the game. However, the cable-only playoff game experiment would only last one season, as on May 11, 2015, it was announced that ABC would simulcast ESPN's Wild Card playoff game beginning in the 2015 season. This was the first NFL game broadcast nationally on ABC since MNF left the network at the end of the 2005 season. The game, announced by the broadcast team of Tirico, Gruden and Salters, was the first of the 2015–16 NFL playoffs. The Kansas City Chiefs defeated the Houston Texans 30–0. The ESPN/ABC simulcast has continued ever since.

In 2018, ABC simulcast ESPN's coverage of the final day of the NFL draft. Since 2019, all three days of the draft have been covered by ABC, with the first two days featuring an entertainment-oriented broadcast hosted by the panel of ESPN's College GameDay alongside the conventionally-formatted coverage carried by ESPN.

On March 18, 2021, ESPN renewed its rights to MNF as part of the NFL's new 11-year contracts beginning in 2023, adding up to three exclusive games on ABC per-season (airing as part of a "split" doubleheader with a second game airing concurrently and exclusively on ESPN), flexible scheduling beginning in Week 12, a Week 18 Saturday doubleheader simulcast between ESPN and ABC, a streaming-exclusive game on ESPN+, a divisional playoff game, and rights to carry two future Super Bowl games. Parts of the new contract were phased-in during the 2021 and 2022 season, with the Week 18 doubleheader debuting in 2021, as well as one of the ABC "split" games and the ESPN+ exclusive in 2022. In 2023, ESPN would add two more "split" games on ABC.

=== NFL on ESPN on NFL Network (2026–present) ===
In August 2025, ESPN, Inc. announced that it would acquire NFL Media from the league, gaining ownership of NFL Network, the "RedZone" brand and distribution rights to the NFL RedZone channel, and the NFL Fantasy service (with the league retaining assets such as NFL.com and NFL Films). As part of the agreement, the NFL took a 10% equity stake in ESPN. The acquisition was completed in February 2026, after which ESPN began to integrate NFL Network into its services.

In the 2026 season, NFL Network's game package was amalgamated into ESPN's contract, with the games now being produced by the network under the NFL on ESPN branding and its #2 commentary team. Contractually, ESPN reallocated four of the national games from its existing contract (including the three "split" ABC MNF games and the ESPN+ game) to NFL Network's package, and renewed the package through at least 2032 with no ability for the league to opt out, ensuring that ESPN will retain rights to these games in the event that the NFL were to invoke the opt-out clauses in its current agreements. In the 2026 season, the four affected games were returned to the league and resold as standalone national games to CBS, Fox, and NBC.

== Commentators ==
=== Current ===
==== Play-by-play ====
1. Joe Buck – lead play-by-play (2022–present)
2. Dave Pasch – #2 play-by-play (2026–present)
3. Bob Wischusen – #3 play-by-play (2026–present)

==== Color commentators ====
1. Troy Aikman – lead color commentator (2022–present)
2. Kurt Warner – #2 color commentator (2026–present)
3. Jason Kelce - #2 color commentator (2026-present)
4. Louis Riddick – #3 color commentator (2026–present); co-#2 color commentator (2019; 2022–2025); co-lead color commentator (2020–2021)

==== Sideline reporters ====
1. Lisa Salters – lead sideline reporter (2015–2024); co-lead sideline reporter (2025–present)
2. Laura Rutledge – fill-in sideline reporter (2020–2024); #2 sideline reporter (2021–2024); co-lead sideline reporter (2025–present)
3. Molly McGrath – #2 sideline reporter (2026–present)
4. Peter Schrager – #3 sideline reporter (2026–present); co-#2 sideline reporter (2025)

==== Rules analyst ====
1. Russell Yurk – lead rules analyst (2024–present)
2. Mike Chase – #2 rules analyst (2026–present)

==== Studio hosts ====
1. Mike Greenberg – Sunday studio host (2024–present)
2. Scott Van Pelt – Monday studio host (2023–present)

==== Studio analysts ====
1. Rex Ryan – Sunday studio analyst (2017–present)
2. Randy Moss – Sunday studio analyst (2016–present)
3. Alex Smith – Monday rotating studio analyst (2021–2023); Sunday studio analyst (2023–present)
4. Tedy Bruschi – Sunday studio analyst (2019–present)
5. Jason McCourty – Monday studio analyst (2026–present)
6. Pat McAfee – Monday studio analyst (2026–present)
7. Jason Kelce – Monday studio analyst (2024–present)
8. Marcus Spears – Monday studio analyst (2023–present)

==== Insiders ====
1. Adam Schefter – lead insider (2015–present)

==== Contributors ====
1. Chris Berman – contributor (2017–present)
2. Katie Feeney – social media contributor (2026–present)

== See also ==
- Monday Night Countdown
- Monday Night Football
- NFL on CBS
- NFL on Fox
- ESPN Sunday Night Football
- NBC Sunday Night Football
