= List of presidents of ESPN =

Bill Rasmussen conceived the concept of ESPN in late May 1978, after he was fired from his job with the World Hockey Association's New England Whalers. One of the first steps in Bill and his son Scott's (who had also been let go by the Whalers) process was finding land to build the channel's broadcasting facilities. The Rasmussens first rented office space in Plainville, Connecticut. However, the plan to base ESPN there was put on hold because of a local ordinance prohibiting buildings from bearing rooftop satellite dishes. Available land area was quickly found in Bristol, Connecticut (where the channel remains headquartered to this day), with funding to buy the property provided by Getty Oil, which purchased 85% of the company from Bill Rasmussen on February 22, 1979, in an attempt to diversify the company's holdings. This helped the credibility of the fledgling company, however there were still many doubters to the viability of their sports channel concept. Another event that helped build ESPN's credibility was securing an advertising agreement with Anheuser-Busch in the spring of 1979; the company invested $1 million to be the "exclusive beer advertised on the network."

== List of presidents ==
=== Bill Rasmussen (July 1978–July 1979) ===
Bill Rasmussen served as the first president and CEO of ESPN. ESPN was founded on July 14, 1978, and was launched on September 7, 1979. ESPN, originally called Entertainment and Sports Programming, was incorporated on July 14, 1978. It began broadcasting fourteen months later, at 7 p.m. on September 7, 1979. ESPN wound up being headquartered in Bristol, Connecticut. Rasmussen paid $18,000 for the first acre of ESPN's campus.

By July 18, 1979, before launch, the investors decided to remove Rasmussen from power. His salary and responsibilities were cut.

Just prior to the launch of ESPN, according to the book Those Guys Have All the Fun: Inside the World of ESPN, Stuart Evey claimed "I made Bill Chairman, but in no way did I want to give him any responsibility!" "Having Bill Rasmussen play a significant role was just not part of the deal." Rasmussen, the one who had the idea for ESPN, stepped back from day-to-day business, having less contact with ESPN until mid 1999. Rasmussen and ESPN "made amends" in 1999 when then-president George Bodenheimer reached out to the founder for the network's 20th anniversary.

On September 30, 1980, ESPN officials announced that Bill Rasmussen was leaving the company by agreement.

=== Chet Simmons (July 1979–June 1982) ===
Slightly more than five weeks prior to ESPN's official launch on September 7, 1979, Chet Simmons joined as President bringing along fellow NBC Sports executive and long time friend Scotty Connal to head production and operations. Leaving the prestige and comfort of NBC Sports was natural for Simmons and Connal who strongly believed in the idea of a 24-hour sports network. However, at the time cable and satellite channels were just in their infancy with HBO launching in 1975 and CNN yet to go on the air. Simmons and Connal and the young ESPN team got the network up on time launching with the first SportsCenter hosted by George Grande and Lee Leonard followed by a slow-pitch softball game. Together, Simmons and Connal led the company through its infancy building a first class operation in Bristol, Connecticut. During his three years, Simmons gave start to some of ESPNs most important franchises including SportsCenter, The NFL Draft and full coverage of the early rounds of the NCAA men's basketball tournament. Additionally, he is credited for the hiring of Chris Berman, Bob Ley, Greg Gumbel, Bryant Gumbel, George Grande, and many others. He left ESPN to become Commissioner of the USFL in 1982.

George Bodenheimer, co-chairman of Disney Media Networks/president of ESPN, says that Simmons, working closely with Scotty Connal, shaped ESPN into something that was real and connected with sports fans. Simmons also forged a culture that is still ESPN's defining advantage in the marketplace, according to Bodenheimer. "He treated everyone like a colleague," says Bodenheimer, who was a driver in the mailroom at the time. "And you had these two icons from the broadcast-sports industry who moved to a funny cable startup and got the best out of everybody."

=== Bill Grimes (June 1982–August 1988) ===
Investing another $15 million into the company and no profits expected any time soon, Bill Getty used management consultant McKinsey & Co. to assess ESPN's future. McKinsey's lead consultant was Roger Werner, who figured with another $120 million and five years ESPN would become a profit maker. Werner soon was hired by ESPN as vice-president of finance, administration, and planning and developed a new business plan. Werner developed a new revenue source beyond advertising by initiating revolutionary affiliate fees paid by the cable operators by number of subscribers starting at 6 cents. Between CBS Cable folding in October 1982 and the new CEO, Bill Grimes, they convince most of the reluctant cable providers to pay. By 1985, the fee was 10 cents.

ESPN was the largest cable channel by the end of 1983 with 28.5 million households. Also in 1983, the company began distributing programming outside the US. ABC, Inc. purchased in January 1984 a 14% holding in the company followed by a June purchased of a controlling interest. Capital Cities Communications, Inc. bought ABC in early 1986 to form Capital Cities/ABC Inc. In 1988, Werner became ESPN's president and CEO.

=== Roger Werner (August 1988–August 1990) ===
In 1988, Roger Werner became the network's president and CEO. During Werner's time at ESPN, the network became the largest cable television network, grew from $1 million to over $600 million in annual sales, and from an annual loss of $30 million to profits of approximately $150 million.

In November 1990, Werner left ESPN and became president and chief executive of Prime Ventures.

=== Steve Bornstein (September 1990–November 1998) ===
In January 1980, Steve Bornstein joined ESPN as manager of program coordination when the cable sports network was a four-month-old start-up. During his time as manager of programming coordination, he developed and implemented ESPN's successful programming philosophy of presenting a mix of events, sports news and special interest programming. In 1988, Bornstein was promoted to Executive Vice President of Programming and Production. He advanced through the network's programming and production ranks, becoming ESPN's youngest president and CEO in 1990 at age 38.

In January 1992, ESPN Radio was launched and began a rollout of 24-hour programming in October 1998. Also in 1992, Bornstein established the subsidiary ESPN Enterprises to develop new businesses like ESPN.com, which has grown to become the leading sports news and information site on the internet.

Bornstein helped to oversee the debut of ESPN2 in October 1993 and ESPNews in November 1996. In October 1997, Bornstein directed the acquisition of Classic Sports Network and rebranded the channel as ESPN Classic, adding yet another network to the ESPN family. Additionally, Bornstein oversaw the development of ESPN International, which has grown to include ownership - in whole or in part - of 24 television networks internationally, as well as a variety of additional businesses that allow ESPN to reach sports fans in over 61 countries and territories across all seven continents.

In March 1998, ESPN the Magazine was launched as a joint venture of Disney Publishing and ESPN with distribution being handled by Hearst Magazines.

Throughout his time at ESPN, the network created many of the popular programming staples that still thrive today, including the iconic SportsCenter franchise, NFL Countdown, NFL PrimeTime, Baseball Tonight and the Outside the Lines series. In addition to his contributions to ESPN programming, Bornstein developed the X Games and Winter X Games, week-long extreme sports competitions. Bornstein is also credited with the creation of the ESPYs Awards, short for Excellence in Sports Performance Yearly Award. First awarded in 1993, the ESPYs gather top celebrities from sports and entertainment to commemorate the past year in sports by recognizing major sports achievements, reliving unforgettable moments and saluting the leading performers and performances.

During his tenure at ESPN, Bornstein's team won 59 Emmys and 57 Cable Ace Awards.

=== George Bodenheimer (November 1998–December 2011; Acting Chair, December 18, 2017–March 5, 2018) ===
George Bodenheimer was president of ESPN since November 19, 1998 and of the former ABC Sports since March 3, 2003.

The Sports Business Journal named Bodenheimer the most influential person of 2008 on a list of 50 people.

As of January 1, 2012, Bodenheimer was the executive chairman of ESPN, with John Skipper replacing him as president. On December 18, 2017, he became acting chairman of ESPN after Skipper announced his resignation.

=== John Skipper (January 2012–December 2017) ===
In June 1997, Skipper became senior vice president and general manager of ESPN the Magazine. In October 2005, he was named as executive vice president of content. On January 1, 2012, he became president of ESPN Inc. and co-chairman of Disney Media Networks. In 2017, Skipper's contract with ESPN's parent company, Disney, was extended through 2021. In his time as president, Skipper was noted for negotiating large television rights contracts for sporting events, including a nine-year, $12 billion deal with the National Basketball Association and a $7.3 billion deal for the College Football Playoff, as well as all four tennis Grand Slams and golf's Masters Tournament.

On December 18, 2017, Skipper revealed that he had been struggling with substance addiction, and announced that he would be resigning as president of ESPN in order to focus on treatment. John Skipper told Sports Illustrated that a cocaine extortion attempt led to his ESPN departure. His predecessor George Bodenheimer served as acting chairman of the company during the transition to new leadership. In the wake of Skipper's announcement, The New York Times reported that he "didn't have a reputation for partying or erratic behavior" among coworkers at ESPN or confidants in his personal life.

After his resignation, many current and former ESPN staffers, including Jemele Hill, Michele Steele, and Keith Olbermann, applauded Skipper's past work and the decision to focus on his personal life.

Skipper's time as President of ESPN received both praise and criticism. He was admired for his strong support of journalism. The Ringer wrote that "he knew quality" and "spoke a language that editorial people could understand." He was credited for taking chances on ambitious projects like Grantland, FiveThirtyEight, The Undefeated, and 30 for 30.

Sports Illustrated wrote that Skipper made ESPN "gobs of cash ... but he also made the network smarter and sharper." Skipper "championed soccer and the NBA, realizing that ESPN, armed with its many affiliates and platforms, could get more out of broadcast rights than any of its competitors could."

He was also praised for pushing ESPN to become "more diverse on air and online when it came to both gender and race."

During Skipper's tenure ESPN lost nearly 15% of its subscribers and laid off more than 500 employees. Additionally, ESPN's TV ratings declined significantly across the board and the network endured criticism from some quarters over the declining quality of its programming.

=== James Pitaro (March 2018–present) ===
On March 5, 2018, The Walt Disney Company announced James Pitaro would become president of ESPN Inc.

== See also ==
- Criticism of ESPN
