= George Bodenheimer =

American media executive (born 1958)

- Born: George W. Bodenheimer; May 6, 1958 (age 68)
- Education: Denison University
- Employer: ESPN
- Title: Co-chairman, Disney Media Networks; President, ESPN, Inc. and ABC Sports

George Bodenheimer (born May 6, 1958) is the former president of ESPN Inc. and of ABC's sports division, known since 2006 as ESPN on ABC. He became president of ESPN on November 19, 1998, and of the former ABC Sports on March 3, 2003.

The Sports Business Journal named Bodenheimer the most influential person of 2008 on a list of 50 people.

As of January 1, 2012, Bodenheimer was the executive chairman of ESPN, with John Skipper replacing him as president. On December 18, 2017, he became acting chairman of ESPN after Skipper announced his resignation.
