= 2026 Buffalo Bills season =

American football team season

- Owner: Terry and Kim Pegula
- General manager: Brandon Beane
- President: Terry Pegula
- Head coach: Joe Brady
- Offensive coordinator: Pete Carmichael Jr.
- Defensive coordinator: Jim Leonhard
- Home stadium: Highmark Stadium

Results
- Record: 9–1
- Division place: 1st AFC East

Uniform
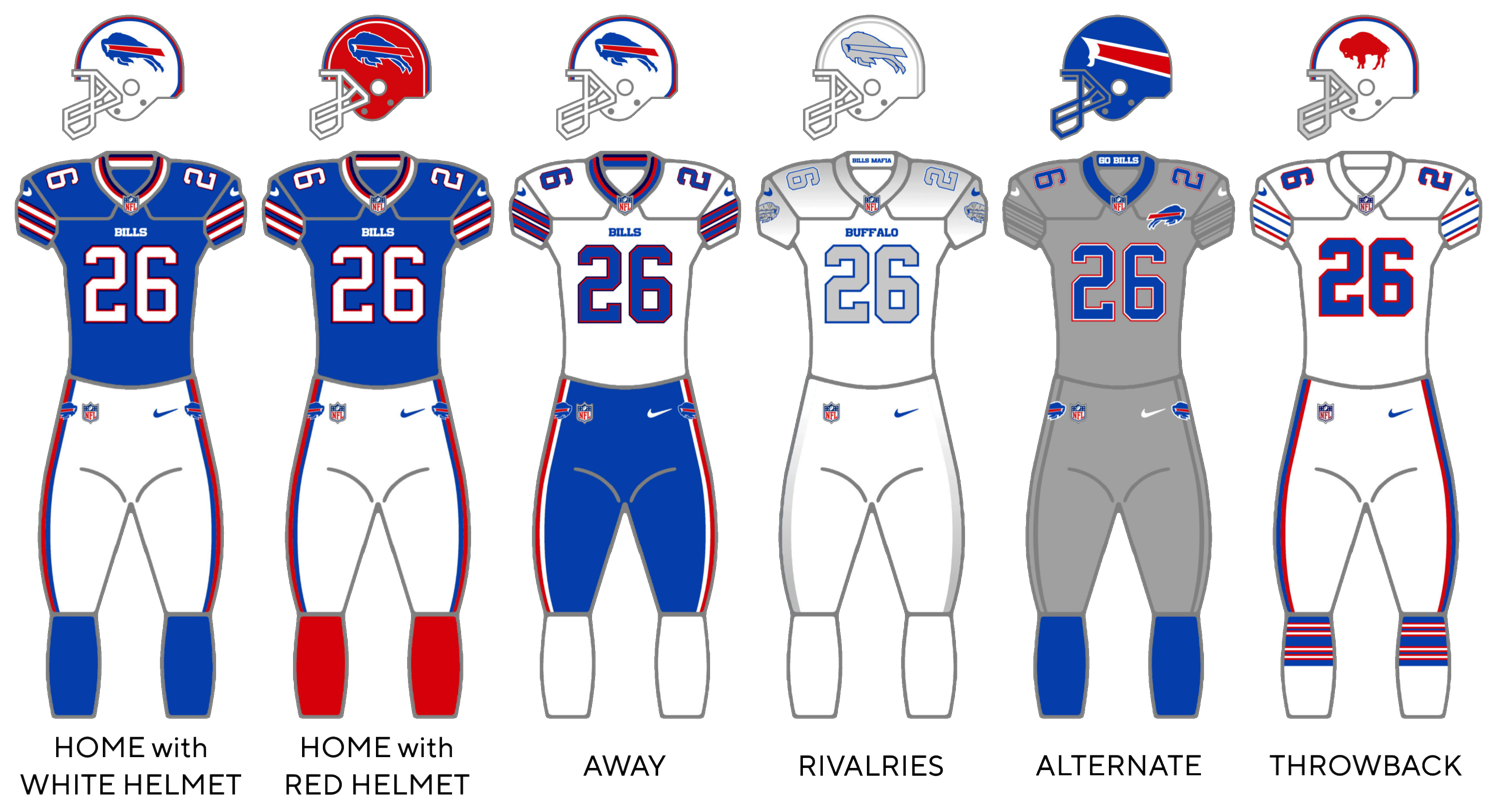

The 2026 season is the Buffalo Bills' 57th in the National Football League (NFL), their 67th overall, their 12th full season under the ownership of Terry and Kim Pegula, their tenth under GM Brandon Beane and their first with Joe Brady as head coach. This is their first season since the 2016 season without longtime head coach Sean McDermott, as he was fired on January 19, 2026, following their overtime defeat against the Denver Broncos in the 2025-26 Divisional round. The Bills are seeking to improve upon their 12–5 record from the previous season, reclaim the AFC East title, and achieve their eighth straight winning season. Following a Week 11 win over the Miami Dolphins, the Bills started the season 9–1 for the first time since 1991 and secured their eighth consecutive winning season.

This is the Bills' first season playing their home games at Highmark Stadium, replacing the old previous stadium, also named Highmark Stadium, which is in the process of demolition. Starting with this season, the Canadian national anthem is played before every home game. This marks the first time an NFL team has played any anthem other than the American one in the United States.

== Off-season ==
=== Uniform changes ===
On July 27, 2026, the Bills announced new 'Nickel City' uniforms featuring a "all-gray jersey-pants combination" as "a tribute to the strength, grit and authenticity of Western New York's hard-working people throughout history". The outfit also features a new helmet design resembling the "charging buffalo" team logo. When it was announced, the new uniform received significant negative responses on all social media platforms.

=== Coaching changes ===
Following their defeat in the Divisional Round of the 2025–26 NFL playoffs, the Bills fired head coach Sean McDermott.

On January 27, 2026, the Bills promoted offensive coordinator (OC) Joe Brady to be the team's replacement for Sean McDermott. He signed a five-year deal to become the team's head coach. Brady previously spent the past two full seasons as the Bills' offensive coordinator under McDermott. He took the OC position on an interim basis in November 2023, after being hired as the team's quarterbacks coach in 2022.

Position	Name	Reason	2026 Replacement	Date	Ref.
Head coach	Sean McDermott	Fired	Joe Brady	January 19	
Cornerbacks coach	Jahmile Addae	Accepted job with Miami Dolphins	Jay Valai	January 29	
Defensive coordinator	Bobby Babich	Accepted job with Green Bay Packers	Jim Leonhard	January 28	
Defensive line coach	Marcus West	Accepted job with Tampa Bay Buccaneers	Terrance Jamison	January 29	
Defensive quality control coach/Offensive advisor	Christian Taylor	Accepted job with Wyoming Cowboys	Craig Robertson	December 19 (Note: Taylor accepted the position in December, he left the Bills at the end of the season.)	
Inside linebackers coach	position created		John Egorugwu	February 2	
Linebackers coach	Al Holcomb	Accepted job with Las Vegas Raiders	position abolished	February 18	
Nickel cornerbacks coach	Mike Pellegrino	Accepted job with Philadelphia Eagles	position abolished	February 13	
Offensive assistant	position created		Trace McSorley	February 26	
Offensive coordinator	Joe Brady	Promoted to head coach	Pete Carmichael Jr.	January 27	
Outside linebackers coach	position created		Bobby April III	February 1	
Offensive line coach	Aaron Kromer	Retired	Pat Meyer	January 18	
Quarterbacks coach	Ronald Curry	Accepted job with Denver Broncos	Bo Hardegree	February 3	
Senior assistant	position created		John Fox	February 13	
Senior defensive assistant	Ryan Nielsen	Accepted job with Minnesota Vikings	Jason Rebrovich (Note: Rebrovich was promoted by the Bills to this position)	January 31	
Special teams coordinator	Chris Tabor	Accepted job with Miami Dolphins	Jeff Rodgers	January 23	
Wide receivers coach	Adam Henry	Accepted job with Pittsburgh Steelers	Drew Terrell	January 28	

=== Roster changes ===
==== Arrivals ====
Position	Player	2025 team(s)	Date signed
K	Maddux Trujillo	Indianapolis Colts	January 6, 2026
WR	Jalen Virgil	Arizona Cardinals	February 10, 2026
CB	Dee Alford	Atlanta Falcons	March 12, 2026
QB	Kyle Allen	Detroit Lions	March 12, 2026
LB	Bradley Chubb	Miami Dolphins	March 12, 2026
S	C. J. Gardner-Johnson	Chicago Bears	March 13, 2026
S	Geno Stone	Cincinnati Bengals	March 16, 2026
C/G	Austin Corbett	Carolina Panthers	March 26, 2026
C	Lloyd Cushenberry	Tennessee Titans	March 26, 2026
WR	Trent Sherfield	Denver Broncos	March 26, 2026
FB	Ben VanSumeren	Philadelphia Eagles	April 29, 2026
LB	Mike Danna	Kansas City Chiefs	May 11, 2026
TE	Shane Zylstra	Detroit Lions	May 12, 2026
LB	Demetrius Flannigan-Fowles	New York Giants	May 27, 2026
WR	Mac Dalena	Seattle Seahawks	June 1, 2026
WR	Deven Thompkins	Atlanta Falcons	June 11, 2026
RB	Ian Wheeler	Louisville Kings (2026)	June 18, 2026
WR	Quentin Skinner	New York Jets	July 14, 2026
WR	Dante Pettis	New Orleans Saints	July 30, 2026
CB	D.J. Miller	Columbus Aviators (2026)	July 31, 2026
LB	Otis Reese IV	New England Patriots	August 6, 2026
CB	Anthony Kendall	Cleveland Browns	August 12, 2026
DL	Greg Gaines	Tampa Bay Buccaneers	August 18, 2026
C	Sincere Haynesworth	St. Louis Battlehawks (2026)	August 26, 2026

==== Departures ====
Position	Player	2026 team	Date signed	Notes
CB/KR	Brandon Codrington	Houston Texans	February 5, 2026	Contracts expired January 26, 2026
DE	Matthew Judon	—	Free agent	Contracts expired January 26, 2026
DE	Shaq Lawson	—	Free agent	Contracts expired January 26, 2026
WR	Kristian Wilkerson	—	Free agent	Contracts expired January 26, 2026
K	Matthew Wright	—	Free agent	Contracts expired January 26, 2026
CB	Dane Jackson	—	Retired	Released March 6, 2026
S	Taylor Rapp	Denver Broncos	August 20, 2026	Released March 6, 2026
WR	Curtis Samuel	—	Free agent	Released March 6, 2026
DE	Joey Bosa	—	Free agent	Contracts expired March 11, 2026
WR	Brandin Cooks	San Francisco 49ers	September 23, 2026	Contracts expired March 11, 2026
WR	Gabe Davis	—	Free agent	Contracts expired March 11, 2026
G	David Edwards	New Orleans Saints	March 11, 2026	Contracts expired March 11, 2026
DE	A. J. Epenesa	Philadelphia Eagles	June 10, 2026	Contracts expired March 11, 2026
FB	Reggie Gilliam	New England Patriots	March 12, 2026	Contracts expired March 11, 2026
DT	DaQuan Jones	New England Patriots	September 12, 2026	Contracts expired March 11, 2026
CB	Cam Lewis	Chicago Bears	March 13, 2026	Contracts expired March 11, 2026
LB	Matt Milano	—	Free agent	Contracts expired March 11, 2026
DT	Larry Ogunjobi	—	Free agent	Contracts expired March 11, 2026
DT	Jordan Phillips	—	Free agent	Contracts expired March 11, 2026
S	Jordan Poyer	—	Free agent	Contracts expired March 11, 2026
K	Matt Prater	—	Free agent	Contracts expired March 11, 2026
S	Darnell Savage	Pittsburgh Steelers	June 2, 2026	Contracts expired March 11, 2026
LB	Baylon Spector	Jacksonville Jaguars	August 17, 2026	Contracts expired March 11, 2026
QB	Mitchell Trubisky	Tennessee Titans	March 12, 2026	Contracts expired March 11, 2026
OL	Ryan Van Demark	Minnesota Vikings	March 20, 2026	Restricted free agent

==== Trades ====
Position	Arrived	From	Date of trade	Departed
WR	D. J. Moore; 2026 5th-round pick	Chicago Bears	March 11, 2026	2026 2nd-round pick
CB	2026 6th-round pick	Las Vegas Raiders	March 11, 2026	Taron Johnson; 2026 7th-round pick
C	2027 6th-round pick	Indianapolis Colts	August 30, 2026	Sedrick Van Pran-Granger; 2027 7th-round pick
S	Amani Hooker; 2027 5th-round pick	Tennessee Titans	November 10, 2026	2027 2nd-round pick

=== Draft ===
2026 Buffalo Bills draft selections
Round	Selection	Player	Position	College	Notes
1	26	Traded to the Houston Texans (Note: The Bills traded first- (26th overall) and third- (91st overall) round selections to the Houston Texans in exchange for first- (28th overall), third- (69th overall) and fifth- (167th overall) round selections.)			
1	28	Traded to the New England Patriots (Note: The Bills traded a first-round selection (28th overall) to the New England Patriots in exchange for first- (31st overall) and fourth- (125th overall) round selections.)			From Texans
1	31	Traded to the Tennessee Titans (Note: The Bills traded first- (31st overall), third- (69th overall) and fifth- (165th overall) round selections to the Tennessee Titans in exchange for second- (35th overall), third- (66th overall) and fourth- (101st overall) round selections.)			From Patriots
2	35	T. J. Parker	DE	Clemson	From Titans
2	60	Traded to the Chicago Bears (Note: The Bills traded a second-round selection (60th overall) to the Chicago Bears in exchange for a fifth-round selection (165th overall) and WR D. J. Moore.)			
2	62	Davison Igbinosun	CB	Ohio State	From Broncos (Note: The Bills traded third- (66th overall) and sixth- (182nd overall) round selections to the Denver Broncos in exchange for a second-round selection (62nd overall).)
3	66	Traded to the Denver Broncos			From Titans
3	69	Traded to the Tennessee Titans			From Giants via Texans
3	91	Traded to the Houston Texans			
4	101	Traded to the Las Vegas Raiders (Note: The Bills traded a fourth-round selection (101st overall) to the Las Vegas Raiders in exchange for fourth- (102nd overall) and 2027 seventh-round selections.)			From Titans
4	102	Jude Bowry	OT	Boston College	From Raiders
4	125	Skyler Bell	WR	UConn	From Bears via Chiefs and Patriots
4	126	Kaleb Elarms-Orr	LB	TCU	
5	165	Traded to the Tennessee Titans			From Bears
5	167	Jalon Kilgore	S	South Carolina	From Texans via Eagles and Texans
5	168	Traded to the Detroit Lions (Note: The Bills traded a fifth-round selection (168th overall) to the Detroit Lions in exchange for fifth- (181st overall) and sixth- (213th overall) round selections.)			
5	181	Zane Durant	DT	Penn State	From Lions
6	182	Traded to the Denver Broncos			From Raiders (Note: The Bills traded a seventh-round selection (228th overall) and CB Taron Johnson to the Las Vegas Raiders in exchange for a sixth-round selection (182nd overall).)
6	208	Traded to the New York Jets (Note: The Bills traded, on August 27, 2024, a 2026 sixth-round selection (208th overall) to the New York Jets in exchange for a 2026 seventh-round selection (220th overall) and CB Brandon Codrington.)			
6	213	Traded to the Chicago Bears (Note: The Bills traded a sixth-round selection (213th overall) to the Chicago Bears in exchange for two seventh-round selections (239th and 241st overall).)			From Seahawks via Jaguars and Lions
7	220	Toriano Pride Jr.	CB	Missouri	From Jets
7	228	Traded to the Las Vegas Raiders			From Cowboys (Note: The Bills traded, on March 12, 2025, a 2025 sixth-round selection and CB Kaiir Elam to the Dallas Cowboys in exchange for 2025 fifth- and 2026 seventh- (228th overall) round selections.)
7	239	Tommy Doman	P	Florida	From Eagles via Jaguars, Browns, and Bears
7	241	Ar'maj Reed-Adams	OG	Texas A&M	From Bears
7	242	Traded to the Cleveland Browns (Note: The Bills traded, on October 15, 2024, 2025 third- and 2026 seventh- (242nd overall) round selections to the Cleveland Browns in exchange for a 2025 sixth-round selection and WR Amari Cooper.)			

2026 Buffalo Bills undrafted free agents
Name	Position	College	Ref.
Jackson Acker	FB	Wisconsin	
Gabriel Benyard	WR	Kennesaw State	
Cade Denhoff	DE	Clemson	
Jordan Dunbar	CB	Missouri State	
Bruno Fina	OT	Duke	
Theron Gaines	DT	Tennessee Tech	
Kody Huisman	DT	Virginia Tech	
Ja'Mori Maclin	WR	Kentucky	
Desmond Reid	RB	Pittsburgh	
Max Tomczak	WR	Youngstown State	
Kani Walker	CB	Arkansas	
Da'Metrius Weatherspoon	OT	Syracuse	

Draft trades

== Staff ==
Buffalo Bills staff
Front office: Owner/CEO/president – Terry Pegula; Owner – Kim Pegula; President of football operations/general manager – Brandon Beane; Assistant general manager – Brian Gaine; Assistant general manager – Terrance Gray; Senior advisor to the GM/football operations – Jim Overdorf; Senior personnel advisor – Malik Boyd; Co-director of pro scouting – Chris Marrow; Co-director of pro scouting – Curtis Rukavina; Assistant director of pro scouting – Asil Mulbah; Vice president of football administration – Kevin Meganck; Director of football operations – Brendan Rowe; Director of college scouting – Matt Bazirgan; Assistant director of college scouting - Alonzo Dotson; Vice president of football research – Dennis Lock; Director of administration – Matt Worswick; Head coaches: Head coach – Joe Brady; Senior assistant – John Fox; Offensive coaches: Offensive coordinator – Pete Carmichael; Quarterbacks – Bo Hardegree; Assistant quarterbacks – Kyle Shurmur; Running backs – Kelly Skipper; Wide receivers – Drew Terrell; Assistant wide receivers – DJ Mangas; Run game coordinator/tight ends – Rob Boras; Offensive line – Pat Meyer; Assistant offensive line – Austin Gund; Pass game specialist/game management – Marc Lubick; Offensive assistant – Trace McSorley; Offensive assistant/fellowship – Milli Wilson	Defensive coaches: Defensive coordinator – Jim Leonhard; Defensive line – Terrance Jamison; Inside linebackers – John Egorugwu; Outside linebackers – Bobby April III; Secondary – Joe Danna; Cornerbacks – Jay Valai; Senior defensive assistant – Jason Rebrovich; Defensive assistant – Alvin Vaughn; Defensive quality control – Craig Robertson; Special teams coaches: Special teams coordinator – Jeff Rodgers; Assistant special teams – Turner West; Strength and conditioning: Head strength and conditioning – Will Greenberg; Strength & conditioning assistant – Nick Lacy; Assistant strength & conditioning – Hal Luther; Senior strength and conditioning assistant – Barry Rubin; Strength & conditioning assistant – Jason Oszvart; → Coaching staff → Front office → More NFL staffs

== Current roster ==
Buffalo Bills roster
Quarterbacks (QB): 17 Josh Allen; 11 Kyle Allen; Running backs (RB): 4 James Cook; 7 Ray Davis KR; 26 Ty Johnson; Wide receivers (WR): 13 Skyler Bell; 0 Keon Coleman; 19 Greg Dortch; 2 D. J. Moore; 10 Khalil Shakir; 14 Tyrell Shavers; Tight ends (TE): 85 Jackson Hawes; 86 Dalton Kincaid; 88 Dawson Knox; 83 Keleki Latu	Offensive linemen (OL): 70 Alec Anderson G; 74 Jude Bowry T/G; 79 Spencer Brown T; 63 Austin Corbett G/C; 53 Lloyd Cushenberry C; 73 Dion Dawkins T; 68 Tylan Grable T/G; 66 Connor McGovern C; 64 O'Cyrus Torrence G; Defensive linemen (DL): 90 DeWayne Carter DE; 97 Greg Gaines NT; 94 Landon Jackson DE; 91 Ed Oliver DE; 98 T. J. Sanders DE; 96 Deone Walker NT	Linebackers (LB): 44 Joe Andreessen ILB; 8 Terrel Bernard ILB; 9 Bradley Chubb OLB; 51 Mike Danna OLB; 52 Kaleb Elarms-Orr ILB; 55 Michael Hoecht OLB; 99 T. J. Parker OLB; 15 Greg Rousseau OLB; 56 Javon Solomon OLB; 42 Dorian Williams ILB; Defensive backs (DB): 23 Dee Alford CB; 47 Christian Benford CB; 24 Cole Bishop S; 28 Sam Franklin Jr. S; 1 Maxwell Hairston CB; 3 Damar Hamlin S; 37 Jordan Hancock CB; 22 Amani Hooker S; 21 Davison Igbinosun CB; 29 Jalon Kilgore S; Special teams (ST): 16 Tyler Bass K; 39 Tommy Doman P; 69 Reid Ferguson LS	Practice squad: 6 Shane Buechele QB; 67 Travis Clayton NT (IPP); -- Te'Cory Couch CB; 20 Frank Gore Jr. RB; 89 Stephen Gosnell WR; 49 Keonta Jenkins ILB; 59 Andre Jones Jr. LB; 38 Kader Kohou CB; 45 Brock Lampe FB; 77 Chase Lundt T; 84 Ja'Mori Maclin WR; 72 Phidarian Mathis NT; 18 Trent Sherfield WR; 25 Geno Stone S; 54 Shaq Thompson ILB; 41 Kani Walker CB; 27 Tre'Davious White CB; Reserve: 92 Zane Durant DE (IR); 5 Josh Palmer WR (IR); 60 Ar'maj Reed-Adams G (IR); 43 Dorian Strong CB (NF-Inj.) 53 active, 16 practice squad (1 IPP), 4 reserve As of November 18, 2026. Rookies in italics.; Roster; Depth chart; Transactions

== Preseason ==
Week	Date	Opponent	Result	Record	Venue	Recap
1	August 15	Carolina Panthers	W 29–14	1–0	Highmark Stadium	Recap
2	August 22	at Cleveland Browns	W 31–7	2–0	Huntington Bank Field	Recap
3	August 27	Pittsburgh Steelers	W 28–27	3–0	Highmark Stadium	Recap

== Regular season ==
=== Schedule ===
The Bills' 2026 schedule was released on May 14, 2026.

Week	Date	Time (ET)	Opponent	Result	Record	Venue	Network	Recap
1	September 13	1:00 p.m.	at Houston Texans	**W** 36–31	1–0	Reliant Stadium	CBS	Recap
2	September 17	8:15 p.m.	Detroit Lions	**W** 41–31	2–0	Highmark Stadium	Prime Video	Recap
3	September 27	1:00 p.m.	Los Angeles Chargers	**W** 24–16	3–0	Highmark Stadium	Fox	Recap
4	October 4	1:00 p.m.	**New England Patriots**	**L** 26–29	3–1	Highmark Stadium	CBS	Recap
5	October 12	8:15 p.m.	at Los Angeles Rams	**W** 37–34 (OT)	4–1	SoFi Stadium	ESPN/ABC	Recap
6	October 18	4:25 p.m.	at Las Vegas Raiders	**W** 33–30	5–1	Allegiant Stadium	CBS	Recap
7	Bye							
8	November 1	1:00 p.m.	Baltimore Ravens	**W** 36–10	6–1	Highmark Stadium	CBS	Recap
9	November 9	8:15 p.m.	at Minnesota Vikings	**W** 23–6	7–1	U.S. Bank Stadium	ESPN/ABC	Recap
10	November 15	1:00 p.m.	at **New York Jets**	**W** 31–12	8–1	MetLife Stadium	CBS	Recap
11	November 22	1:00 p.m.	**Miami Dolphins**	**W** 26–9	9–1	Highmark Stadium	CBS	Recap
12	November 26	8:20 p.m.	Kansas City Chiefs			Highmark Stadium	NBC	
13	December 6	4:25 p.m.	at **New England Patriots**			Gillette Stadium	CBS	
14	December 13	8:20 p.m.	at Green Bay Packers			Lambeau Field	NBC	
15	December 19	8:20 p.m.	Chicago Bears			Highmark Stadium	CBS	
16	December 25	4:30 p.m.	at Denver Broncos			Empower Field at Mile High	Netflix	
17	January 3	1:00 p.m.	at **Miami Dolphins**			Hard Rock Stadium	CBS	
18	January 9/10	TBD	**New York Jets**			Highmark Stadium	TBD	

Notes

- Intra-division opponents are in **bold** text.
- Networks, dates and times from Weeks 13–17 are subject to change as a result of flexible scheduling; games in Weeks 15 and 16 are exempt.
- The date, time and network for Week 18 will be finalized at the end of Week 17.

=== Game summaries ===
==== Week 1: at Houston Texans ====
Week 1: Buffalo Bills at Houston Texans – Game summary

Quarter	1	2	3	4	Total
**Bills**	3	21	3	9	**36**
Texans	7	14	0	10	**31**

at Reliant Stadium, Houston, Texas

- Date: September 13
- Game time: 1:00 p.m. EDT/12:00 p.m. CDT
- Game weather: None (retractable roof closed)
- Game attendance: 71,008
- Referee: Alex Moore
- TV announcers (CBS): Ian Eagle, Ross Tucker and Evan Washburn
- Recap, Game Book

Game information

**First quarter**

- BUF – Tyler Bass 46-yard field goal, 7:28. Bills 3–0. **Drive: 4 plays, 4 yards, 2:04.**
- HOU – David Montgomery 1-yard run (Ka'imi Fairbairn kick), 0:32. Texans 7–3. **Drive: 12 plays, 76 yards, 6:56.**

**Second quarter**

- BUF – Josh Allen 21-yard run (Tyler Bass kick), 12:46. Bills 10–7. **Drive: 6 plays, 62 yards, 2:46.**
- HOU – David Montgomery 18-yard run (Ka'imi Fairbairn kick), 4:48. Texans 14–10. **Drive: 13 plays, 75 yards, 7:58.**
- BUF – Josh Allen 1-yard run (Tyler Bass kick), 3:59. Bills 17–14. **Drive: 3 plays, 65 yards, 0:49.**
- BUF – D. J. Moore 43-yard pass from Josh Allen (Tyler Bass kick), 1:29. Bills 24–14. **Drive: 3 plays, 96 yards, 0:41.**
- HOU – Nico Collins 12-yard pass from C. J. Stroud (Ka'imi Fairbairn kick), 0:26. Bills 24–21. **Drive: 4 plays, 86 yards, 1:03.**

**Third quarter**

- BUF – Tyler Bass 34-yard field goal, 4:24. Bills 27–21. **Drive: 6 plays, 27 yards, 3:34.**

**Fourth quarter**

- HOU – David Montgomery 7-yard pass from C. J. Stroud (Ka'imi Fairbairn kick), 13:34. Texans 28–27. **Drive: 13 plays, 72 yards, 5:50.**
- BUF – Tyler Bass 33-yard field goal, 10:31. Bills 30–28. **Drive: 7 plays, 52 yards, 3:03.**
- HOU – Ka'imi Fairbairn 58-yard field goal, 6:44. Texans 31–30. **Drive: 7 plays, 26 yards, 3:47.**
- BUF – Josh Palmer 34-yard pass from Josh Allen (pass failed), 1:36. Bills 36–31. **Drive: 7 plays, 96 yards, 1:37.**

**Top passers**

- BUF – Josh Allen – 20/29, 334 yards, 2 TD
- HOU – C. J. Stroud – 26/38, 274 yards, 2 TD

**Top rushers**

- BUF – James Cook – 13 rushes, 57 yards
- HOU – David Montgomery – 20 rushes, 60 yards, 2 TD

**Top receivers**

- BUF – Dalton Kincaid – 5 receptions, 130 yards
- HOU – Nico Collins – 7 receptions, 75 yards, TD

With their first win at Houston since 2006, the Bills started their season 1–0 for the third consecutive year. Greg Rousseau had 2 forced fumbles in this game, with Terrel Bernard recovering one of those fumbles with only 9 seconds remaining in the fourth quarter to secure victory for Buffalo in what was otherwise described as an offensive shootout. With the win, the Bills defeated the Texans on the road for the first time since 2006 and overall since 2021. Additionally, Brady became the fourth coach in Bills history to win their debut as the team's head coach. Tight end Dalton Kincaid had the most receiving yards by a Bills tight end since 1967, with 130 yards in this game.

Recording four touchdowns in this game (two passing and two rushing), Josh Allen became the fastest quarterback in NFL history to reach 300 touchdowns in the regular season, at 129 games. Allen's performance in this game was described as "impressive" and "memorable" by Sports Illustrated, with CBS saying he "delivered in the game's most tense moments" and The Guardian saying "The Bills quarterback produced his usual thrills".

==== Week 2: vs. Detroit Lions ====
Week 2: Detroit Lions at Buffalo Bills – Game summary

Quarter	1	2	3	4	Total
Lions	0	10	7	14	**31**
**Bills**	14	13	7	7	**41**

at Highmark Stadium, Orchard Park, New York

- Date: September 17
- Game time: 8:15 p.m. EDT
- Game weather: Cloudy, 67 °F (19 °C)
- Game attendance: 60,644
- Referee: Ron Torbert
- TV announcers (WKBW/Prime Video): Al Michaels, Kirk Herbstreit and Kaylee Hartung
- Recap, Game Book

Game information

**First quarter**

- BUF – Josh Allen 1-yard run (Tyler Bass kick), 9:09. Bills 7–0. **Drive: 10 plays, 85 yards, 5:51.**
- BUF – Josh Palmer 43-yard pass from Josh Allen (Tyler Bass kick), 3:42. Bills 14–0. **Drive: 8 plays, 79 yards, 3:27.**

**Second quarter**

- BUF – Dawson Knox 1-yard pass from Josh Allen (Tyler Bass kick), 11:48. Bills 21–0. **Drive: 9 plays, 57 yards, 4:09.**
- DET – Jahmyr Gibbs 11-yard pass from Jared Goff (Jake Bates kick), 5:03. Bills 21–7. **Drive: 12 plays, 70 yards, 6:45.**
- BUF – Dalton Kincaid 16-yard pass from Josh Allen (kick failed), 2:52. Bills 27–7. **Drive: 4 plays, 68 yards, 2:11.**
- DET – Jake Bates 31-yard field goal, 0:00. Bills 27–10. **Drive: 8 plays, 65 yards, 0:39.**

**Third quarter**

- DET – Amon-Ra St. Brown 2-yard pass from Jared Goff (Jake Bates kick), 9:29. Bills 27–17. **Drive: 11 plays, 74 yards, 5:31.**
- BUF – Josh Allen 2-yard run (Tyler Bass kick), 1:07. Bills 34–17. **Drive: 15 plays, 75 yards, 8:22.**

**Fourth quarter**

- DET – Sam LaPorta 1-yard pass from Jared Goff (Jake Bates kick), 10:53. Bills 34–24. **Drive: 11 plays, 66 yards, 5:14.**
- BUF – James Cook 1-yard run (Tyler Bass kick), 2:50. Bills 41–24. **Drive: 8 plays, 61 yards, 4:38.**
- DET – Amon-Ra St. Brown 27-yard pass from Jared Goff (Jake Bates kick), 1:42. Bills 41–31. **Drive: 7 plays, 68 yards, 1:08.**

**Top passers**

- DET – Jared Goff – 26/38, 327 yards, 4 TD
- BUF – Josh Allen – 20/31, 248 yards, 3 TD

**Top rushers**

- DET – Jahmyr Gibbs – 16 rushes, 52 yards
- BUF – James Cook – 21 rushes, 135 yards, TD

**Top receivers**

- BUF – Dalton Kincaid – 7 receptions, 95 yards, TD
- DET – Amon-Ra St. Brown – 9 receptions, 142 yards, 2 TD

With their first win in Highmark Stadium, the Bills started 2–0 for the third consecutive season. They also began 1–0 against the NFC North. Head coach Joe Brady became the first in franchise history to start his coaching career with two wins. Greg Rousseau had another standout performance, with multiple sacks in this game. This also marked Buffalo's 7th consecutive win against the Lions since 2006.

Despite experiencing flu-like symptoms before the game, Josh Allen had five total touchdowns (three passing and two rushing), 248 yards, and zero interceptions with a performance that The Athletic described as "dominant", "stellar", and "outstanding" and one that made USA Today say Allen is playing "the best he ever has". With this game, Allen became the first player in NFL history with at least five touchdown passes and three touchdown runs through the first two games of the season. He also recorded his fourth career game with three touchdown passes and two touchdown runs, with no other player having more than two such performances.

==== Week 3: vs. Los Angeles Chargers ====
Week 3: Los Angeles Chargers at Buffalo Bills – Game summary

Quarter	1	2	3	4	Total
Chargers	10	0	3	3	**16**
**Bills**	0	10	0	14	**24**

at Highmark Stadium, Orchard Park, New York

- Date: September 27
- Game time: 1:00 p.m. EDT
- Game weather: Sunny, 68 °F (20 °C)
- Game attendance: 60,361
- Referee: Clete Blakeman
- TV announcers (Fox): Kevin Burkhardt, Tom Brady, Erin Andrews and Tom Rinaldi
- Recap, Game Book

Game information

**First quarter**

- LAC – Keaton Mitchell 1-yard pass from Justin Herbert (Cameron Dicker kick), 10:33. Chargers 7–0. **Drive: 8 plays, 47 yards, 4:11.**
- LAC – Cameron Dicker 31-yard field goal, 0:34. Chargers 10–0. **Drive: 6 plays, 30 yards, 2:49.**

**Second quarter**

- BUF – Tyler Bass 28-yard field goal, 6:02. Chargers 10–3. **Drive: 10 plays, 55 yards, 4:20.**
- BUF – Josh Allen 1-yard run (Tyler Bass kick), 0:16. Tied 10–10. **Drive: 10 plays, 80 yards, 3:49.**

**Third quarter**

- LAC – Cameron Dicker 21-yard field goal, 6:12. Chargers 13–10. **Drive: 13 plays, 69 yards, 8:48.**

**Fourth quarter**

- BUF – Josh Allen 1-yard run (Tyler Bass kick), 7:35. Bills 17–13. **Drive: 13 plays, 58 yards, 5:50.**
- BUF – James Cook 3-yard run (Tyler Bass kick), 3:13. Bills 24–13. **Drive: 6 plays, 45 yards, 1:55.**
- LAC – Cameron Dicker 33-yard field goal, 1:56. Bills 24–16. **Drive: 7 plays, 69 yards, 1:17.**

**Top passers**

- LAC – Justin Herbert – 20/34, 226 yards, TD, INT
- BUF – Josh Allen – 16/26, 204 yards, 2 INT

**Top rushers**

- LAC – Omarion Hampton – 15 rushes, 56 yards
- BUF – James Cook – 24 rushes, 154 yards, TD

**Top receivers**

- LAC – Tre Harris – 6 receptions, 76 yards
- BUF – D. J. Moore – 6 receptions, 67 yards

During this game, the team wore the Nickel City jerseys for the first time. Despite five turnovers, the Bills held off the Chargers. With the win, the Bills started 3–0 for the third consecutive season. They also started 1–0 against the AFC West.

==== Week 4: vs. New England Patriots ====
Week 4: New England Patriots at Buffalo Bills – Game summary

Quarter	1	2	3	4	Total
**Patriots**	7	7	7	8	**29**
Bills	0	17	0	9	**26**

at Highmark Stadium, Orchard Park, New York

- Date: October 4
- Game time: 1:00 p.m. EDT
- Game weather: Cloudy, 69 °F (21 °C)
- Game attendance: 60,606
- Referee: Bill Vinovich
- TV announcers (CBS): Ian Eagle, Ross Tucker and Evan Washburn
- Recap, Game Book

Game information

**First quarter**

- NE – Romeo Doubs 14-yard pass from Drake Maye (Andy Borregales kick), 7:01. Patriots 7–0. **Drive: 12 plays, 97 yards, 6:28.**

**Second quarter**

- BUF – James Cook 8-yard run (Tyler Bass kick), 14:15. Tied 7–7. **Drive: 13 plays, 62 yards, 7:46.**
- NE – Rhamondre Stevenson 1-yard run (Andy Borregales kick), 5:38. Patriots 14–7. **Drive: 6 plays, 63 yards, 2:43.**
- BUF – Josh Allen 2-yard run (Tyler Bass kick), 1:00. Tied 14–14. **Drive: 9 plays, 67 yards, 4:38.**
- BUF – Tyler Bass 27-yard field goal, 0:02. Bills 17–14. **Drive: 1 play, 0 yards, 0:03.**

**Third quarter**

- NE – Romeo Doubs 2-yard pass from Drake Maye (Andy Borregales kick), 8:15. Patriots 21–17. **Drive: 14 plays, 73 yards, 6:45.**

**Fourth quarter**

- BUF – Tyler Bass 38-yard field goal, 11:07. Patriots 21–20. **Drive: 10 plays, 60 yards, 4:40.**
- BUF – Keon Coleman 34-yard pass from Josh Allen (pass failed), 4:27. Bills 26–21. **Drive: 5 plays, 80 yards, 2:09.**
- NE – Efton Chism 23-yard pass from Drake Maye (Drake Maye–Rhamondre Stevenson pass), 1:50. Patriots 29–26. **Drive: 8 plays, 73 yards, 2:37.**

**Top passers**

- NE – Drake Maye – 22/37, 269 yards, 3 TD, INT
- BUF – Josh Allen – 23/33, 253 yards, TD, INT

**Top rushers**

- NE – Drake Maye – 8 rushes, 54 yards
- BUF – James Cook – 12 rushes, 75 yards, TD

**Top receivers**

- NE – Hunter Henry – 5 receptions, 62 yards
- BUF – Keon Coleman – 6 receptions, 116 yards, TD

With the loss, the Bills fell to 3–1 for the first time since 2024 and began 0–1 against their division. This also marked the Bills' second straight home loss to the Patriots.

==== Week 5: at Los Angeles Rams ====
Week 5: Buffalo Bills at Los Angeles Rams – Game summary

Quarter	1	2	3	4	OT	Total
**Bills**	6	7	6	15	3	**37**
Rams	0	7	7	20	0	**34**

at SoFi Stadium, Inglewood, California

- Date: October 12
- Game time: 8:15 p.m. EDT/5:15 p.m. PDT
- Game weather: Cloudy, 69 °F (21 °C) (fixed roof)
- Game attendance: 73,882
- Referee: Scott Novak
- TV announcers (ESPN/ABC): Joe Buck, Troy Aikman, Lisa Salters and Laura Rutledge
- Recap, Game Book

Game information

**First quarter**

- BUF – Tyler Bass 49-yard field goal, 13:23. Bills 3–0. **Drive: 4 plays, -5 yards, 1:37.**
- BUF – Tyler Bass 23-yard field goal, 0:10. Bills 6–0. **Drive: 10 plays, 55 yards, 5:25.**

**Second quarter**

- LAR – Davante Adams 4-yard pass from Matthew Stafford (Harrison Mevis kick), 8:00. Rams 7–6. **Drive: 14 plays, 71 yards, 7:10.**
- BUF – James Cook 17-yard run (Tyler Bass kick), 5:09. Bills 13–7. **Drive: 5 plays, 69 yards, 2:51.**

**Third quarter**

- LAR – Blake Corum 1-yard run (Harrison Mevis kick), 10:11. Rams 14–13. **Drive: 9 plays, 60 yards, 4:49.**
- BUF – Keon Coleman 7-yard pass from Josh Allen (kick failed), 2:45. Bills 19–14. **Drive: 9 plays, 60 yards, 4:49.**

**Fourth quarter**

- LAR – Puka Nacua 2-yard pass from Matthew Stafford (pass failed), 14:16. Rams 20–19. **Drive: 6 plays, 83 yards, 3:29.**
- BUF – Josh Allen 1-yard run (Josh Allen–Dalton Kincaid pass), 11:28. Bills 27–20. **Drive: 5 plays, 80 yards, 2:48.**
- LAR – Davante Adams 5-yard pass from Matthew Stafford (Harrison Mevis kick), 7:14. Tied 27–27. **Drive: 8 plays, 71 yards, 4:14.**
- BUF – James Cook 5-yard run (Tyler Bass kick), 1:39. Bills 34–27. **Drive: 11 plays, 71 yards, 5:35.**
- LAR – Kyren Williams 1-yard run (Harrison Mevis kick), 0:05. Tied 34–34. **Drive: 8 plays, 63 yards, 1:34.**

**Overtime**

- BUF – Tyler Bass 45-yard field goal, 1:55. Bills 37–34. **Drive: 5 plays, 35 yards, 2:16.**

**Top passers**

- BUF – Josh Allen – 12/19, 210 yards, TD, INT
- LAR – Matthew Stafford – 40/54, 383 yards, 3 TD

**Top rushers**

- BUF – Josh Allen – 10 rushes, 121 yards, TD
- LAR – Kyren Williams – 16 rushes, 49 yards, TD

**Top receivers**

- BUF – Khalil Shakir – 3 receptions, 80 yards
- LAR – Puka Nacua – 17 receptions, 138 yards, TD

With the win, the Bills improved to 4–1 for the second consecutive year. This marked the first overtime win of Josh Allen’s career, after losing the previous seven scenarios including the postseason. This also marked the Bills' first regular season overtime win since the 2017 Snow Bowl. The game winning drive was set up after Rousseau blocked what would have been a game-winning field goal by the Rams with four minutes left in overtime.

==== Week 6: at Las Vegas Raiders ====
Week 6: Buffalo Bills at Las Vegas Raiders – Game summary

Quarter	1	2	3	4	Total
**Bills**	3	10	10	10	**33**
Raiders	7	6	0	17	**30**

at Allegiant Stadium, Paradise, Nevada

- Date: October 18
- Game time: 4:25 p.m. EDT/1:25 p.m. PDT
- Game weather: None (indoor stadium)
- Game attendance: 62,618
- Referee: Shawn Smith
- TV announcers (CBS): Jim Nantz, J. J. Watt, and Tracy Wolfson
- Recap, Game Book

Game information

**First quarter**

- BUF – Tyler Bass 44-yard field goal, 10:12. Bills 3–0. **Drive: 9 plays, 30 yards, 4:48.**
- LV – Ashton Jeanty 1-yard run (Matt Gay kick), 4:27. Raiders 7–3. **Drive: 9 plays 70 yards, 5:45.**

**Second quarter**

- BUF – Tyler Bass 28-yard field goal, 14:45. Raiders 7–6. **Drive: 10 plays, 58 yards, 4:42.**
- BUF – Khalil Shakir 9-yard pass from Josh Allen (Tyler Bass kick), 7:13. Bills 13–7. **Drive: 9 plays, 85 yards, 5:48.'**
- LV – Matt Gay 35-yard field goal, 2:14. Bills 13–10. **Drive: 10 plays, 57 yards, 4:59.**
- LV – Matt Gay 27-yard field goal, 0:00. Tied 13–13. **Drive: 8 plays, 58 yards, 1:40.**

**Third quarter**

- BUF – Tyler Bass 47-yard field goal, 9:45. Bills 16–13. **Drive: 9 plays, 37 yards, 4:40.**
- BUF – Keon Coleman 12-yard pass from Josh Allen (Tyler Bass kick), 6:22. Bills 23–13. **Drive: 6 plays, 32 yards, 2:32.'**

**Fourth quarter'**

- LV – Matt Gay 23-yard field goal, 13:32. Bills 23–16. **Drive: 15 plays, 70 yards, 7:50.**
- LV – Tre Tucker 11-yard pass from Kirk Cousins (Matt Gay kick), 8:07. 'Tied 23–23. **Drive: 9 plays, 91 yards, 3:49.**
- BUF – James Cook 3-yard run (Tyler Bass kick), 4:43. 'Bills 30–23. **Drive: 7 plays, 66 yards, 3:24.**
- BUF – Tyler Bass 38-yard field goal, 1:56. Bills 33–23. **Drive: 8 plays, 29 yards, 2:12.**
- LV – Tre Tucker 44-yard pass from Kirk Cousins (Matt Gay kick), 1:32. Bills 33–30. **Drive: 2 plays, 66 yards, 0:24.**

**Top passers**

- BUF – Josh Allen – 23/33, 255 yards, 2 TD
- LV – Kirk Cousins – 23/41, 313 yards, 2 TD, INT

**Top rushers**

- BUF – James Cook – 22 rushes, 95 yards, TD
- LV – Mike Washington Jr. – 9 rushes, 43 yards

**Top receivers**

- BUF – Keon Coleman – 4 receptions, 59 yards, TD
- LV – Tre Tucker – 5 receptions, 97 yards, 2 TD

With the win, the Bills improved to 5–1 for the first time since 2022. They also improved to 2–0 against the AFC West. During the third quarter, Josh Allen threw a 15-yard chest pass touchdown to wide receiver Keon Coleman on third-and-8 while running past multiple Raiders defenders on a play that was called "one of the season's best plays" by Bleacher Report, "remarkable" by CBS Sports, and "the type of highlight you’d expect to see on a Hall of Fame highlight reel" by The Athletic. With that touchdown, Allen tied the franchise record for touchdown passes set by former Bills quarterback Jim Kelly, with WHAM-TV commenting "Kelly set the standard for every Bills quarterback, but even the Hall of Famer likely wouldn't have made the type of play Josh Allen pulled off".

==== Week 8: vs. Baltimore Ravens ====
Week 8: Baltimore Ravens at Buffalo Bills – Game summary

Quarter	1	2	3	4	Total
Ravens	7	0	3	0	**10**
**Bills**	10	6	7	13	**36**

at Highmark Stadium, Orchard Park, New York

- Date: November 1
- Game time: 1:00 p.m. EST
- Game weather: Sunny, 70 °F (21 °C)
- Game attendance: 60,542
- Referee: Clay Martin
- TV announcers (CBS): Ian Eagle, Ross Tucker and Evan Washburn
- Recap, Game Book

Game information

**First quarter**

- BUF – Josh Allen 1-yard run (Tyler Bass kick), 10:10. Bills 7–0. **Drive: 10 plays, 60 yards, 4:50.**
- BUF – Tyler Bass 56-yard field goal, 6:05. Bills 10–0. **Drive: 5 plays, 19 yards, 2:26.**
- BAL – Derrick Henry 2-yard run (Tyler Loop kick), 4:05. Bills 10–7. **Drive: 2 plays, 17 yards, 0:52.**

**Second quarter**

- BUF – Tyler Bass 22-yard field goal, 9:50. Bills 13–7. **Drive: 9 plays, 16 yards, 4:11.**
- BUF – Tyler Bass 51-yard field goal, 0:09. Bills 16–7. **Drive: 4 plays, 0 yards, 0:59.**

**Third quarter**

- BAL – Tyler Loop 26-yard field goal, 11:28. Bills 16–10. **Drive: 8 plays, 61 yards, 3:32.**
- BUF – James Cook 5-yard run (Tyler Bass kick), 8:59. Bills 23–10. **Drive: 6 plays, 77 yards, 2:29.**

**Fourth quarter**

- BUF – D. J. Moore 11-yard pass from Josh Allen (pass failed), 12:18. Bills 29–10. **Drive: 8 plays, 65 yards, 3:39.**
- BUF – Dalton Kincaid 23-yard pass from Josh Allen (Tyler Bass kick), 5:58. Bills 36–10. **Drive: 6 plays, 43 yards, 3:33.**

**Top passers**

- BAL – Joe Fagnano – 10/21, 91 yards, INT
- BUF – Josh Allen – 21/34, 289 yards, 2 TD, INT

**Top rushers**

- BAL – Derrick Henry – 11 rushes, 53 yards, TD
- BUF – James Cook – 21 rushes, 80 yards, TD

**Top receivers**

- BAL – Rashod Bateman – 1 reception, 22 yards
- BUF – Dalton Kincaid – 4 receptions, 86 yards, TD

Despite coming into the game with one of the league's statistically worst defenses, Buffalo limited Baltimore to just 10 points and 144 total yards after Ravens quarterback Lamar Jackson and his backup Tyler Huntley both left with injuries. Ravens wide receiver Zay Flowers was held without a catch for the first time in his career in a game where the Bills had multiple forced fumble recoveries, interceptions, and sacks. With the win, the Bills improved to 6–1 for the first time since 2022. This was also their 12th consecutive win directly after a bye week.

Early in the fourth quarter, Josh Allen threw an 11-yard touchdown pass to wide receiver D. J. Moore, marking his 259th career passing touchdown. This touchdown moved him ahead of Jim Kelly, who was in attendance for the game, for the most passing touchdowns in Bills franchise history.

==== Week 9: at Minnesota Vikings ====
Week 9: Buffalo Bills at Minnesota Vikings – Game summary

Quarter	1	2	3	4	Total
**Bills**	3	7	3	10	**23**
Vikings	0	6	0	0	**6**

at U.S. Bank Stadium, Minneapolis, Minnesota

- Date: November 9
- Game time: 8:15 p.m. EST/7:15 p.m. CST
- Game weather: None (indoor stadium)
- Game attendance: 66,955
- Referee: Carl Cheffers
- TV announcers (ESPN/ABC): Joe Buck, Troy Aikman, Lisa Salters and Laura Rutledge
- Recap, Game Book

Game information

**First quarter**

- BUF – Tyler Bass 39-yard field goal, 1:57. Bills 3–0. **Drive: 7 plays, 23 yards, 3:30.**

**Second quarter**

- MIN – Will Reichard 43-yard field goal, 4:02. Tied 3–3. **Drive: 4 plays, 9 yards, 1:34.**
- BUF – Keleki Latu 25-yard pass from Josh Allen (Tyler Bass kick), 0:44. Bills 10–3. **Drive: 8 plays, 80 yards, 3:18.**
- MIN – Will Reichard 53-yard field goal, 0:05. Bills 10–6. **Drive: 7 plays, 46 yards, 0:39.**

**Third quarter**

- BUF – Tyler Bass 25-yard field goal, 6:03. Bills 13–6. **Drive: 14 plays, 83 yards, 7:08.**

**Fourth quarter**

- BUF – James Cook 5-yard run (Tyler Bass kick), 6:17. Bills 20–6. **Drive: 15 plays, 84 yards, 8:32.**
- BUF – Tyler Bass 52-yard field goal, 4:40. Bills 23–6. **Drive: 4 plays, 7 yards, 0:58.**

**Top passers**

- BUF – Josh Allen – 21/31, 234 yards, TD, INT
- MIN – Carson Wentz – 8/25, 81 yards, 2 INT

**Top rushers**

- BUF – James Cook – 31 rushes, 107 yards, TD
- MIN – Jordan Mason – 6 rushes, 35 yards

**Top receivers**

- BUF – Khalil Shakir – 4 receptions, 58 yards
- MIN – Justin Jefferson – 3 receptions, 58 yards

Keleki Latu, an undrafted free agent tight end, caught his first career touchdown pass from Allen during the game, marking the only passing touchdown of the night from either team. With that touchdown, Allen tied quarterback Peyton Manning for the most regular season touchdowns in NFL history over a player's first 10 years. With the win, the Bills improved to 7–1 for the first time since 1993. They also improved to 2–0 against the NFC North.

James Cook, who scored a rushing touchdown in this game, had 31 carries for 107 yards and hit 5,000 career rushing yards with this performance, doing so alongside Allen to become the first quarterback and running back duo to achieve 5,000 career rushing yards in the same season.

==== Week 10: at New York Jets ====
Week 10: Buffalo Bills at New York Jets – Game summary

Quarter	1	2	3	4	Total
**Bills**	7	3	14	7	**31**
Jets	0	6	6	0	**12**

at MetLife Stadium, East Rutherford, New Jersey

- Date: November 15
- Game time: 1:00 p.m. EST
- Game weather: Sunny, 49 °F (9 °C)
- Game attendance: 82,953
- Referee: Ron Torbert
- TV announcers (CBS): Kevin Harlan, Trent Green and Melanie Collins
- Recap, Game Book

Game information

**First quarter**

- BUF – Josh Allen 1-yard run (Tyler Bass kick), 2:49. Bills 7–0. **Drive: 12 plays, 63 yards, 6:27.**

**Second quarter**

- NYJ – Jason Sanders 41-yard field goal, 12:20. Bills 7–3. **Drive: 12 plays, 42 yards, 5:29.**
- BUF – Tyler Bass 37-yard field goal, 6:53. Bills 10–3. **Drive: 10 plays, 59 yards, 5:27.**
- NYJ – Jason Sanders 27-yard field goal, 0:12. Bills 10–6. **Drive: 9 plays, 75 yards, 2:03.**

**Third quarter**

- NYJ – Jason Sanders 22-yard field goal, 10:02. Bills 10–9. **Drive: 10 plays, 61 yards, 4:58.**
- BUF – Josh Allen 1-yard run (Tyler Bass kick), 8:02. Bills 17–9. **Drive: 4 plays, 62 yards, 2:00.**
- NYJ – Jason Sanders 48-yard field goal, 4:21. Bills 17–12. **Drive: 7 plays, 35 yards, 3:41.**
- BUF – D. J. Moore 45-yard pass from Josh Allen (Tyler Bass kick), 3:42. Bills 24–12. **Drive: 2 plays, 66 yards, 0:39.**

**Fourth quarter**

- BUF – James Cook 74-yard run (Tyler Bass kick), 4:42. Bills 31–12. **Drive: 1 plays, 74 yards, 0:10.**

**Top passers**

- BUF – Josh Allen – 11/21, 196 yards, TD, INT
- NYJ – Geno Smith – 13/21, 148 yards

**Top rushers**

- BUF – James Cook – 18 rushes, 157 yards, TD
- NYJ – Breece Hall – 11 rushes, 41 yards

**Top receivers**

- BUF – D. J. Moore – 4 receptions, 90 yards, TD
- NYJ – Garrett Wilson – 7 receptions, 106 yards

With two touchdowns in this game (one passing and one rushing), Allen passed Manning for the most combined passing and rushing touchdowns by a player in his first 10 seasons in league history. Cook, who had 157 yards in this game, became the fifth player in NFL history and the first player since 2006 to have at least 75 rushing yards and a rushing touchdown in eight straight games. With the win, the Bills improved to 8–1 for the first time since 1991. They also improved to 1–1 against the AFC East. For the second straight game, they held their opponent to zero touchdowns.

==== Week 11: vs. Miami Dolphins ====
Week 11: Miami Dolphins at Buffalo Bills – Game summary

Quarter	1	2	3	4	Total
Dolphins	0	6	3	0	**9**
**Bills**	6	14	0	6	**26**

at Highmark Stadium, Orchard Park, New York

- Date: November 22
- Game time: 1:00 p.m. EST
- Game weather: Fair, 64 °F (18 °C)
- Game attendance: 60,590
- Referee: Scott Novak
- TV announcers (CBS): Spero Dedes, Adam Archuleta, and Aditi Kinkhabwala
- Recap, Game Book

With the win, the Bills improved to 9–1 for the first time since 1991 and secured their eighth consecutive winning season. They also improved to 2–1 against the AFC East. For the third straight game, they held their opponent to zero touchdowns.

==== Week 12: vs. Kansas City Chiefs ====
Thanksgiving Day games

Week 12: Kansas City Chiefs at Buffalo Bills – Game summary

Quarter	1	2	3	4	Total
Chiefs	0	0	0	0	**0**
Bills	0	0	0	0	**0**

at Highmark Stadium, Orchard Park, New York

- Date: November 26
- Game time: 8:20 p.m. EST
- TV announcers (NBC): Mike Tirico, Cris Collinsworth and Melissa Stark
- Preview

=== Standings ===
==== Division ====
AFC East
	W	L	T	PCT	DIV	CONF	PF	PA	STK
Buffalo Bills	9	1	0	.900	2–1	6–1	313	208	W6
New England Patriots	5	5	0	.500	3–0	5–1	221	242	L2
New York Jets	2	8	0	.200	0–3	2–5	194	254	L5
Miami Dolphins	1	9	0	.100	1–2	1–6	157	250	L4

==== Conference ====
AFC
Seed	Team	Division	W	L	T	PCT	DIV	CONF	SOS	SOV	STK
**Division leaders**
1	Buffalo Bills	East	9	1	0	.900	2–1	6–1	.424	.416	W6
2	Kansas City Chiefs	West	8	2	0	.800	3–1	6–1	.374	.300	W3
3 (Note: Jacksonville wins tie break over Cincinnati based on head-to-head victory.)	Jacksonville Jaguars	South	7	2	0	.778	2–1	6–2	.444	.408	W3
4	Cincinnati Bengals	North	7	2	0	.778	2–1	5–2	.389	.310	W5
**Wild cards**
5	Denver Broncos	West	7	2	0	.778	2–1	3–1	.591	.522	W5
6 (Note: Cleveland wins tie break over Pittsburgh based on division record.)	Cleveland Browns	North	6	4	0	.600	2–1	4–3	.410	.377	W1
7	Pittsburgh Steelers	North	6	4	0	.600	2–2	3–3	.465	.417	L2
**In the hunt**
8	New England Patriots	East	5	5	0	.500	3–0	5–1	.576	.440	L2
9 (Note: Houston wins tie break over Las Vegas based on strength of victory.)	Houston Texans	South	4	6	0	.400	3–1	4–4	.480	.308	W1
10	Las Vegas Raiders	West	4	6	0	.400	1–1	3–3	.500	.179	L2
11	Baltimore Ravens	North	4	7	0	.364	0–2	2–5	.459	.286	L6
12	Indianapolis Colts	South	3	8	0	.273	1–3	2–6	.463	.293	L1
13	New York Jets	East	2	8	0	.200	0–3	2–5	.560	.350	L5
14	Los Angeles Chargers	West	1	8	0	.111	0–3	1–5	.560	.364	W1
15 (Note: Tennessee wins tie break over Miami based on strength of victory.)	Tennessee Titans	South	1	9	0	.100	1–2	1–6	.465	.273	L4
16	Miami Dolphins	East	1	9	0	.100	1–2	1–6	.622	.200	L4
