= List of current NFL special teams coordinators =

Below is a list of current National Football League (NFL) special teams coordinators.

== AFC ==
Team	Coordinator	Since	Previous coaching position
AFC East
Buffalo Bills	Jeff Rodgers	2026	Arizona Cardinals assistant head coach & special teams coordinator (2018–2025)
Miami Dolphins	Chris Tabor	2026	Buffalo Bills special teams coordinator (2025)
New England Patriots	Jeremy Springer	2024	Los Angeles Rams assistant special teams coach (2022–2023)
New York Jets	Chris Banjo	2025	Denver Broncos assistant special teams coach (2023–2024)
AFC North
Baltimore Ravens	Anthony Levine	2026	Baltimore Ravens assistant special teams coach (2025)
Cincinnati Bengals	Darrin Simmons	2003	Carolina Panthers assistant special teams coordinator & assistant strength and conditioning coach (1999–2002)
Cleveland Browns	Byron Storer	2026	Green Bay Packers assistant special teams coach (2022–2025)
Pittsburgh Steelers	Danny Crossman	2026	Miami Dolphins special teams coordinator (2019–2024)
AFC South
Houston Texans	Frank Ross	2021	Indianapolis Colts assistant special teams coach (2018–2020)
Indianapolis Colts	Brian Mason	2023	Notre Dame Fighting Irish special teams coordinator (2022)
Jacksonville Jaguars	Heath Farwell	2022	Buffalo Bills special teams coordinator (2019–2021)
Tennessee Titans	John Fassel	2025	Dallas Cowboys special teams coordinator (2020–2024)
AFC West
Denver Broncos	Darren Rizzi	2025	New Orleans Saints assistant head coach & special teams coordinator (2019–2024)
Kansas City Chiefs	Dave Toub	2013	Chicago Bears special teams coordinator (2004–2012)
Las Vegas Raiders	Joe DeCamillis	2026	South Carolina Gamecocks associate head coach & special teams coordinator (2024–2025)
Los Angeles Chargers	Ryan Ficken	2022	Minnesota Vikings special teams coordinator (2021)

== NFC ==
Team	Coordinator	Since	Previous coaching position
NFC East
Dallas Cowboys	Nick Sorensen	2025	San Francisco 49ers defensive coordinator (2024)
New York Giants	Chris Horton	2026	Baltimore Ravens special teams coordinator (2019–2025)
Philadelphia Eagles	Michael Clay	2021	San Francisco 49ers assistant special teams coach (2018–2020)
Washington Commanders	Larry Izzo	2024	Seattle Seahawks special teams coordinator (2021–2023)
NFC North
Chicago Bears	Richard Hightower	2022	San Francisco 49ers special teams coordinator (2017–2021)
Detroit Lions	Dave Fipp	2021	Philadelphia Eagles special teams coordinator (2013–2020)
Green Bay Packers	Cameron Achord	2026	New York Giants assistant special teams coach (2024–2025)
Minnesota Vikings	Matt Daniels	2022	Dallas Cowboys assistant special teams coach (2020–2021)
NFC South
Atlanta Falcons	Craig Aukerman	2026	Miami Dolphins special teams coordinator (2025)
Carolina Panthers	Tracy Smith	2024	Seattle Seahawks assistant special teams coach (2021–2023)
New Orleans Saints	Phil Galiano	2025	New Orleans Saints assistant special team coach (2019–2024)
Tampa Bay Buccaneers	Danny Smith	2026	Pittsburgh Steelers special teams coordinator (2013–2025)
NFC West
Arizona Cardinals	Michael Ghobrial	2026	New York Giants special teams coordinator (2024–2025)
Los Angeles Rams	Ray Ventrone	2026	Cleveland Browns assistant head coach & special teams coordinator (2023–2025)
San Francisco 49ers	Brant Boyer	2025	New York Jets special teams coordinator (2016–2024)
Seattle Seahawks	Jay Harbaugh	2024	Michigan Wolverines special teams coordinator & safeties coach (2022–2023)

== See also ==
- List of current NFL head coaches
- List of current NFL offensive coordinators
- List of current NFL defensive coordinators
