= List of current NFL head coaches =

This page shows the current National Football League (NFL) head coaches and their career records. The longest tenured head coach on his current team is Andy Reid, who has been with the Kansas City Chiefs since 2013. Reid is also the only active coach with multiple Super Bowl wins, with three. Other active head coaches to have won a Super Bowl are John Harbaugh, Mike Macdonald, Mike McCarthy, Sean McVay, Sean Payton, and Nick Sirianni. Harbaugh, McCarthy, and Payton are the only coaches to have won with a previous team. The oldest active coach is Andy Reid at 68; the youngest active coach is Joe Brady at 37. McVay at 30 was the youngest head coach at the time of hiring in modern NFL history and the youngest to win a Super Bowl at 36.

== List ==
Coaching records are accurate as of the end of the 2025 NFL season.

Current NFL head coaches
Team	Image	Coach	Hired	Active record (Note: Coaching records from the current term with the team; record, statistics, and category ranks from previous term with the team are not included.)						Tenure accomplishments	Career record (Note: Career record, statistics, and category ranks in the NFL; records in other leagues are not included.)						Ref.
Team	Image	Coach	Hired	Regular season				Playoffs		Tenure accomplishments	Regular season				Playoffs		Ref.
Team	Image	Coach	Hired	W	L	T	W%	W	L	Tenure accomplishments	W	L	T	W%	W	L	Ref.
Arizona Cardinals		Mike LaFleur	2026	2	5	0	.286	0	0		2	5	0	.286	0	0	
Atlanta Falcons		Kevin Stefanski	2026	2	5	0	.285	0	0		47	60	0	.435	1	2	
Baltimore Ravens		Jesse Minter	2026	4	3	0	.571	0	0		4	3	0	.571	0	0	
Buffalo Bills		Joe Brady	2026	5	1	0	.833	0	0		5	1	0	.833	0	0	
Carolina Panthers		Dave Canales	2024	16	24	0	.400	0	1	1 NFC South title 1 playoff berth	16	24	0	.400	0	1	
Chicago Bears		Ben Johnson	2025	14	7	0	.666	1	1	1 NFC North title 1 playoff berth	14	7	0	.666	1	1	
Cincinnati Bengals		Zac Taylor	2019	56	65	1	.466	5	2	1 AFC championship 2 AFC North titles 2 playoff berths	56	65	1	.466	5	2	
Cleveland Browns		Todd Monken	2026	5	2	0	.714	0	0		5	2	0	.714	0	0	
Dallas Cowboys		Brian Schottenheimer	2025	10	13	1	.437	0	0		10	13	1	.437	0	0	
Denver Broncos		Sean Payton	2023	36	21	0	.631	1	2	1 AFC West title 2 playoff berths	189	110	0	.632	10	10	
Detroit Lions		Dan Campbell	2021	51	38	1	.572	2	2	2 NFC North titles 2 playoff berths	56	45	1	.553	2	2	
Green Bay Packers		Matt LaFleur	2019	80	42	1	.654	3	6	3 NFC North titles 6 playoff berths	80	42	1	.654	3	6	
Houston Texans		DeMeco Ryans	2023	34	23	0	.596	3	3	2 AFC South titles 3 playoff berths	34	23	0	.596	3	3	
Indianapolis Colts		Shane Steichen	2023	27	30	0	.473	0	0		27	30	0	.473	0	0	
Jacksonville Jaguars		Liam Coen	2025	17	6	0	.739	0	1	1 AFC South title 1 playoff berth	17	6	0	.739	0	1	
Kansas City Chiefs		Andy Reid	2013	154	64	0	.705	18	8	3 Super Bowl championships 5 AFC championships 9 AFC West titles 11 playoff berths	284	157	1	.643	28	17	
Las Vegas Raiders		Klint Kubiak	2026	3	3	0	.500	0	0		3	3	0	.500	0	0	
Los Angeles Chargers		Jim Harbaugh	2024	22	18	0	.550	0	2	2 playoff berths	66	37	1	.639	5	5	
Los Angeles Rams		Sean McVay	2017	95	60	0	.612	10	6	1 Super Bowl championship 2 NFC championships 4 NFC West titles 7 playoff berths 1 Coach of the Year award	95	60	0	.612	10	6	
Miami Dolphins		Jeff Hafley	2026	0	5	0	.000	0	0		0	5	0	.000	0	0	
Minnesota Vikings		Kevin O'Connell	2022	48	25	0	.657	0	2	1 NFC North title 2 playoff berths 1 Coach of the Year award	48	25	0	.657	0	2	
New England Patriots		Mike Vrabel	2025	18	5	0	.782	3	1	1 AFC championship 1 AFC East title 1 playoff berth 1 Coach of the Year award	72	50	0	.590	5	4	
New Orleans Saints		Kellen Moore	2025	8	15	0	.347	0	0		8	15	0	.347	0	0	
New York Giants		John Harbaugh	2026	3	2	1	.583	0	0		183	115	1	.616	13	11	
New York Jets		Aaron Glenn	2025	5	18	0	.217	0	0		5	18	0	.217	0	0	
Philadelphia Eagles		Nick Sirianni	2021	61	30	0	.670	6	4	1 Super Bowl championship 2 NFC championships 3 NFC East titles 5 playoff berths	61	30	0	.670	6	4	
Pittsburgh Steelers		Mike McCarthy	2026	4	2	0	.666	0	0		179	114	2	.610	11	11	
San Francisco 49ers		Kyle Shanahan	2017	87	67	0	.564	9	5	2 NFC championships 3 NFC West titles 5 playoff berths	87	67	0	.564	9	5	
Seattle Seahawks		Mike Macdonald	2024	27	13	0	.675	3	0	1 Super Bowl championship 1 NFC championship 1 NFC West title 1 playoff berth	27	13	0	.675	3	0	
Tampa Bay Buccaneers		Todd Bowles	2022	36	37	0	.493	1	3	3 NFC South titles 3 playoff berths	62	78	0	.442	1	3	
Tennessee Titans		Robert Saleh	2026	1	5	0	.167	0	0		21	41	0	.339	0	0	
Washington Commanders		Dan Quinn	2024	18	20	1	.474	2	1	1 playoff berth	61	62	1	.496	5	3	

== See also ==
- List of NFL head coaches
- List of NFL head coach wins leaders
- List of NFL head coaches by playoff record
- List of current NFL offensive coordinators
- List of current NFL defensive coordinators
- List of current NFL special teams coordinators
