= List of current NFL offensive coordinators =

Below is a list of current National Football League (NFL) offensive coordinators.

== AFC ==
Team	Coordinator	Since	Previous coaching position
AFC East
Buffalo Bills	Pete Carmichael Jr.	2026	Denver Broncos senior offensive assistant (2024–2025)
Miami Dolphins	Bobby Slowik	2026	Dolphins senior passing game coordinator (2025)
New England Patriots	Josh McDaniels	2025	Las Vegas Raiders head coach (2022–2023)
New York Jets	Frank Reich	2026	Stanford interim head coach (2025)
AFC North
Baltimore Ravens	Declan Doyle	2026	Chicago Bears offensive coordinator (2025)
Cincinnati Bengals	Dan Pitcher	2024	Bengals quarterbacks coach (2020–2023)
Cleveland Browns	Travis Switzer	2026	Baltimore Ravens run game coordinator (2024–2025)
Pittsburgh Steelers	Brian Angelichio	2026	Minnesota Vikings tight ends coach & pass game coordinator (2022–2025)
AFC South
Houston Texans	Nick Caley	2025	Los Angeles Rams tight ends coach & pass game coordinator (2024)
Indianapolis Colts	Jim Bob Cooter	2023	Jacksonville Jaguars passing game coordinator (2022)
Jacksonville Jaguars	Grant Udinski	2025	Minnesota Vikings assistant offensive coordinator/quarterbacks coach (2024)
Tennessee Titans	Brian Daboll	2026	New York Giants head coach (2022–2025)
AFC West
Denver Broncos	Davis Webb	2026	Broncos quarterbacks coach & pass game coordinator (2025)
Kansas City Chiefs	Eric Bieniemy	2026	Chicago Bears running backs coach (2025)
Las Vegas Raiders	Andrew Janocko	2026	Seattle Seahawks quarterbacks coach (2025)
Los Angeles Chargers	Mike McDaniel	2026	Miami Dolphins head coach (2022–2025)

== NFC ==
Team	Coordinator	Since	Previous coaching position
NFC East
Dallas Cowboys	Klayton Adams	2025	Arizona Cardinals offensive line coach (2023–2024)
New York Giants	Matt Nagy	2026	Kansas City Chiefs offensive coordinator (2023–2025)
Philadelphia Eagles	Sean Mannion	2026	Green Bay Packers quarterbacks coach (2025)
Washington Commanders	David Blough	2026	Commanders assistant quarterbacks coach (2024–2025)
NFC North
Chicago Bears	Press Taylor	2026	Bears passing game coordinator (2025)
Detroit Lions	Drew Petzing	2026	Arizona Cardinals offensive coordinator (2023–2025)
Green Bay Packers	Adam Stenavich	2022	Packers offensive line coach & run game coordinator (2019–2021)
Minnesota Vikings	Wes Phillips	2022	Los Angeles Rams tight ends coach & passing game coordinator (2019–2021)
NFC South
Atlanta Falcons	Tommy Rees	2026	Cleveland Browns offensive coordinator (2025)
Carolina Panthers	Brad Idzik	2024	Tampa Bay Buccaneers wide receivers coach (2023)
New Orleans Saints	Doug Nussmeier	2025	Philadelphia Eagles quarterbacks coach (2024)
Tampa Bay Buccaneers	Zac Robinson	2026	Atlanta Falcons offensive coordinator (2024–2025)
NFC West
Arizona Cardinals	Nathaniel Hackett	2026	Green Bay Packers defensive analyst (2025)
Los Angeles Rams	Nathan Scheelhaase	2026	Rams passing game coordinator (2025)
San Francisco 49ers	Klay Kubiak	2025	49ers offensive passing game specialist (2024)
Seattle Seahawks	Brian Fleury	2026	San Francisco 49ers tight ends coach & run game coordinator (2022–2025)

== See also ==
- List of current NFL head coaches
- List of current NFL defensive coordinators
- List of current NFL special teams coordinators
