= List of current NFL defensive coordinators =

Below is a list of current National Football League (NFL) defensive coordinators.

== AFC ==
Team	Coordinator	Since	Previous coaching position
AFC East
Buffalo Bills	Jim Leonhard	2026	Denver Broncos assistant head coach & defensive pass game coordinator (2025)
Miami Dolphins	Sean Duggan	2026	Green Bay Packers linebackers coach (2025)
New England Patriots	Zak Kuhr	2026	Patriots inside linebackers coach (2025)
New York Jets	Brian Duker	2026	Miami Dolphins secondary coach & pass game coordinator (2024–2025)
AFC North
Baltimore Ravens	Anthony Weaver	2026	Miami Dolphins defensive coordinator (2024–2025)
Cincinnati Bengals	Al Golden	2025	Notre Dame Fighting Irish defensive coordinator (2022–2024)
Cleveland Browns	Mike Rutenberg	2026	Atlanta Falcons defensive pass game coordinator (2025)
Pittsburgh Steelers	Patrick Graham	2026	Las Vegas Raiders defensive coordinator (2022–2025)
AFC South
Houston Texans	Matt Burke	2023	Arizona Cardinals defensive line coach (2022)
Indianapolis Colts	Lou Anarumo	2025	Cincinnati Bengals defensive coordinator (2019–2024)
Jacksonville Jaguars	Anthony Campanile	2025	Green Bay Packers linebackers coach & run game coordinator (2024)
Tennessee Titans	Gus Bradley	2026	San Francisco 49ers assistant head coach (2025)
AFC West
Denver Broncos	Vance Joseph	2023	Arizona Cardinals defensive coordinator (2019–2022)
Kansas City Chiefs	Steve Spagnuolo	2019	New York Giants defensive coordinator (2015–2017)
Las Vegas Raiders	Rob Leonard	2026	Raiders defensive line coach & run game coordinator (2023–2025)
Los Angeles Chargers	Chris O'Leary	2026	Western Michigan Broncos defensive coordinator & safeties coach (2025)

== NFC ==
Team	Coordinator	Since	Previous coaching position
NFC East
Dallas Cowboys	Christian Parker	2026	Philadelphia Eagles defensive backs coach & pass game coordinator (2024–2025)
New York Giants	Dennard Wilson	2026	Tennessee Titans defensive coordinator (2024–2025)
Philadelphia Eagles	Vic Fangio	2024	Miami Dolphins defensive coordinator (2023)
Washington Commanders	Daronte Jones	2026	Minnesota Vikings defensive backs coach & pass game coordinator (2022–2025)
NFC North
Chicago Bears	Dennis Allen	2025	New Orleans Saints head coach (2022–2024)
Detroit Lions	Kelvin Sheppard	2025	Lions linebackers coach (2022–2024)
Green Bay Packers	Jonathan Gannon	2026	Arizona Cardinals head coach (2023–2025)
Minnesota Vikings	Brian Flores	2023	Pittsburgh Steelers senior defensive assistant & linebackers coach (2022)
NFC South
Atlanta Falcons	Jeff Ulbrich	2025	New York Jets defensive coordinator (2021–2024)
Carolina Panthers	Todd Wash	2026	Panthers defensive line coach (2023–present)
New Orleans Saints	Brandon Staley	2025	San Francisco 49ers assistant head coach (2024)
Tampa Bay Buccaneers	Todd Bowles (Note: Promoted to head coach in 2022)	2019	New York Jets head coach (2015–2018)
NFC West
Arizona Cardinals	Nick Rallis	2023	Philadelphia Eagles linebackers coach (2021–2022)
Los Angeles Rams	Chris Shula	2024	Rams linebackers coach & pass rush coordinator (2023)
San Francisco 49ers	Raheem Morris	2026	Atlanta Falcons head coach (2024–2025)
Seattle Seahawks	Aden Durde	2024	Dallas Cowboys defensive line coach (2021–2023)

== See also ==
- List of current NFL head coaches
- List of current NFL offensive coordinators
- List of current NFL special teams coordinators
