= Pat Meyer =

American football player and coach (born 1972)

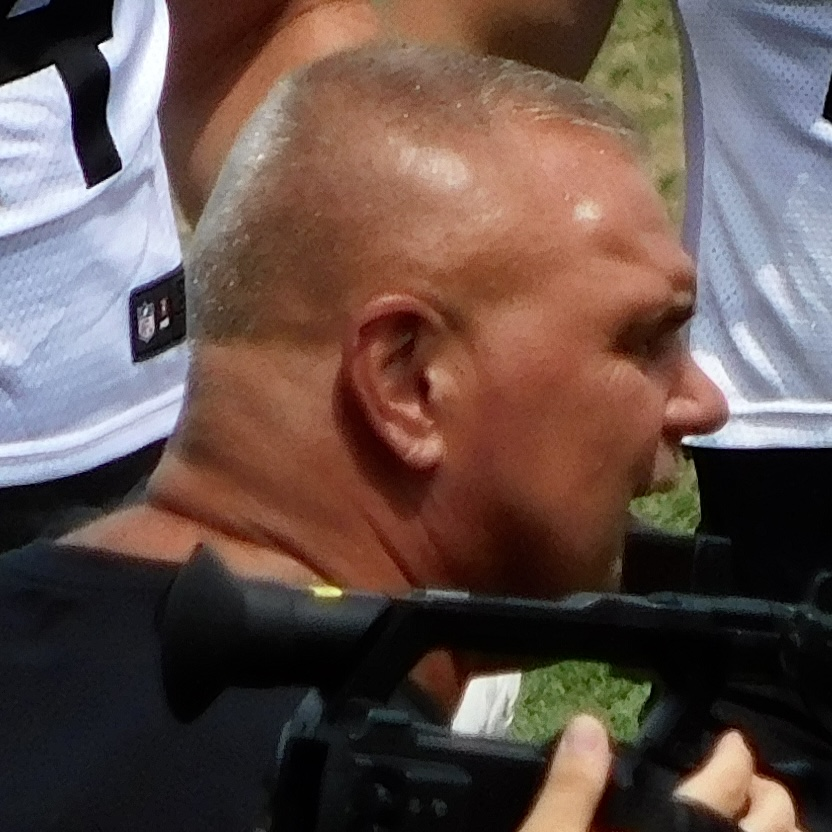
- Meyer with the Pittsburgh Steelers in 2025

Buffalo Bills
- Title: Offensive line coach

Personal information
- Born: April 5, 1972 (age 54); Youngstown, Ohio, U.S.

Career information
- Position: Offensive lineman
- High school: Girard (OH)
- College: Colorado State

Career history

Playing
- Arizona Cardinals (1995); St. Louis Stampede (1996)

Coaching
- Memphis (1997–1999); Graduate assistant (1997–1998); Strength and conditioning coach (1999); NC State (2000–2006) Strength and conditioning coach; Florida State (2007) Strength and conditioning coach; Colorado State (2008–2011) Offensive line coach; Montreal Alouettes (2012) Offensive coordinator & offensive line coach; Chicago Bears (2013–2014) Assistant offensive line coach; Buffalo Bills (2015–2016) Offensive assistant; Los Angeles Chargers (2017–2019) Offensive line coach & run game coordinator; Carolina Panthers (2020–2021) Offensive line coach; Pittsburgh Steelers (2022–2025) Offensive line coach; Buffalo Bills (2026–present) Offensive line coach

Awards and highlights
- Second-team All-WAC (1993)

Pat Meyer (born April 5, 1972) is an American football coach who is currently the offensive line coach for the Buffalo Bills of the National Football League (NFL). He formerly served as the offensive line coach for the Pittsburgh Steelers, and the Carolina Panthers.

== Playing career ==
After being a five-sport letterman at Girard High School in football, wrestling, basketball, baseball and track, Meyer played college football for Colorado State as an offensive lineman from 1991–1994, earning All-Western Athletic Conference honors for three consecutive years, and in his final season, Meyer played four different positions. He was later signed by the Arizona Cardinals in 1995, and played for the St. Louis Stampede of the Arena Football League the following season.

== Coaching career ==
=== Early coaching career ===
In 1997, Meyer became a graduate assistant for the Memphis Tigers, and later worked in the school's strength and conditioning department, and spent five months in 2000 as the director. Meyer later joined the NC State Wolfpack as the head strength and conditioning coach, and in 2004, he was named head of the entire athletic department's strength programs, which he would hold until 2006, in which he joined Florida State as strength coach. In 2008, Meyer joined his alma mater as the offensive line coach, and became the offensive coordinator in 2011. In 2012, Meyer joined the Canadian Football League's Montreal Alouettes as the offensive coordinator/offensive line coach. During the season, the Alouettes finished third in the league in scoring with 26.6 points per game, was tied for first in touchdowns with 51 and fewest sacks allowed with 30.

=== Chicago Bears ===
On January 24, 2013, Meyer was hired by former Alouettes head coach Marc Trestman to become the Chicago Bears' assistant offensive line coach; Meyer was the third Alouettes assistant to join the Bears, following tight ends coach Andy Bischoff and assistant defensive line coach Michael Sinclair. On February 12, 2014, Meyer was promoted to offensive line coach. He was not retained by the Bears for the 2015 season.

=== Buffalo Bills ===
On July 31, 2015, Meyer was hired as a football operations consultant for the Buffalo Bills.

=== Los Angeles Chargers ===
In 2017, Meyer joined the Los Angeles Chargers as the offensive line coach and run game coordinator.

=== Carolina Panthers ===
In 2020, Meyer joined the Carolina Panthers as the offensive line coach. He was fired after the 2021 season.

=== Pittsburgh Steelers ===
On February 15, 2022, Meyer joined the Steelers as the team’s offensive line coach. After the resignation of Mike Tomlin, Meyer was not retained by new head coach, Mike McCarthy.

=== Buffalo Bills (second stint) ===
On January 29, 2026, Meyer returned to the Buffalo Bills and was hired as the team's offensive line coach under new head coach Joe Brady.
