= Jay Valai =

American football coach and player

Buffalo Bills
- Title: Cornerbacks coach

Personal information
- Born: Euless, Texas, U.S.
- Listed height: 5 ft 8 in (1.73 m)
- Listed weight: 200 lb (91 kg)

Career information
- Position: Cornerback
- College: Wisconsin (2006–2010)

Career history
- Georgia (2016–2017) Defensive quality control coach; Kansas City Chiefs (2018) Defensive quality control coach; Rutgers (2019) Cornerbacks coach; Texas (2020) Cornerbacks coach; Alabama (2021) Cornerbacks coach; Oklahoma (2022–2025) Cornerbacks & co-defensive coordinator; Buffalo Bills (2026–present) Cornerbacks coach

Awards and highlights
- 2× Second-team All-Big Ten (2008, 2009)

Jay Valai is an American football coach and former player, currently serving as the cornerbacks coach for the Buffalo Bills of the National Football League (NFL).

== Playing career ==
Valai redshirted as a true freshman in 2006. Valai was a four-year letter winner at Wisconsin as a defensive back where he served as a captain in 2010. He earned second team All-Big Ten (coaches) honors in 2008 and 2009. He totaled 153 tackles, four forced fumbles and a pair of interceptions in 48 career games.

Pre-draft measurables
Height	Weight	40-yard dash	10-yard split	20-yard split	20-yard shuttle	Three-cone drill	Vertical jump	Broad jump	Bench press
5 ft 8 1/4 in (1.73 m)	200 lb (91 kg)	4.73 s	1.62 s	2.76 s	4.21 s	7.00 s	34.0 in (0.86 m)	10 ft 0 in (3.05 m)	21 reps
All values from Pro Day

== Coaching career ==
=== Early coaching career ===
Jay began his coaching career at Georgia as a defensive quality control coach, where he served in that position in 2016 and 2017. In 2018, he went to the NFL and coached under Andy Reid with the Chiefs as a defensive quality control coach. In 2019, he returned to the college ranks as the cornerbacks coach for Rutgers. In 2020, he went to his home state of Texas becoming the Longhorns cornerbacks coach.

=== Alabama ===
After Texas fired Tom Herman, Valai left the program and on January 20, 2021, he was announced as Houston's cornerbacks coach. However, he would change his mind and on February 1, the Philadelphia Eagles announced that they hired Valai as cornerbacks coach for the inaugural staff for Nick Sirianni. However, twelve days later, Alabama announced that they hired Valai as the team's cornerbacks coach.

=== Oklahoma ===
However, on January 11, 2022, Valai would move schools once again and become the co-defensive coordinator for Oklahoma.

=== Buffalo Bills ===
On February 2, 2026, Valai was hired to serve as the cornerbacks coach for the Buffalo Bills under new head coach Joe Brady.

== Personal life ==
Valai and his wife Courtney have two daughters and two sons.
