= Jason Rebrovich =

American football coach (born 1978)

Buffalo Bills
- Title: Senior defensive assistant

Personal information
- Born: March 15, 1978 (age 48); Clarence, New York, U.S.

Career information
- College: SUNY Cortland

Career history
- Cortland (2001–2003) Defensive line coach & strength coach; Concord (2004) Defensive line & head strength and conditioning coach; Ferris State (2005–2007) Defensive line & head strength and conditioning coach; Cortland (2008–2010) Defensive coordinator, special teams coordinator, & head strength and conditioning coach; Syracuse (2011–2012) Defensive quality control coach; Buffalo Bills (2013) Defensive quality control coach; Buffalo Bills (2014) Assistant defensive line coach; Buffalo Bills (2015) Outside linebackers coach; Buffalo Bills (2016) Defensive line coach; Jacksonville Jaguars (2017–2018) Assistant defensive line coach; Jacksonville Jaguars (2019–2020) Defensive line coach; Green Bay Packers (2022) Outside linebackers coach; Green Bay Packers (2023) Pass rush specialist; Green Bay Packers (2024) Defensive line coach; Buffalo Bills (2025) Assistant defensive line coach; Buffalo Bills (2026–present) Senior defensive assistant

Jason Rebrovich (born March 15, 1978) is an American football coach who currently serves as a senior defensive assistant coach for the Buffalo Bills of the National Football League (NFL). He has also spent time coaching the Jacksonville Jaguars and Green Bay Packers.

== Coaching experience ==
=== SUNY Cortland ===
Rebrovich began coaching at his alma mater of Cortland State from 2001 to 2003, serving as its defensive line and strength coach.

=== Concord University ===
He then served as the defensive line coach and head strength and conditioning coach at Concord University in 2004.

=== Ferris State ===
He then served as the defensive line coach and head strength and conditioning coach at Ferris State University from 2005 to 2007.

=== SUNY Cortland (second stint) ===
Rebrovich returned to Cortland in 2008 as its defensive coordinator, as well as its special teams coordinator and head strength and conditioning coach. He stayed there through the 2010 season.

=== Syracuse ===
Rebrovich became the defensive quality control coach for Syracuse University for the 2011 and 2012 seasons.

=== Buffalo Bills ===
In 2013, he followed then Syracuse head coach Doug Marrone to the Buffalo Bills where he became a defensive quality control coach. Rebrovich was promoted to assistant defensive line coach before the 2014 season. He was promoted to outside linebackers coach before the 2015 season. He was promoted to defensive line coach before the 2016 season.

=== Jacksonville Jaguars ===
In 2017, he began working with the Jacksonville Jaguars as assistant defensive line coach. He was promoted to defensive line coach on January 16, 2019. He missed the team's week 11 game in 2020 against the Pittsburgh Steelers due to COVID-19 pandemic protocols.

=== Green Bay Packers ===
On February 18, 2022, Rebrovich was hired by the Green Bay Packers as their outside linebackers coach. On March 10, 2023, Rebrovich was promoted to pass rush specialist. On March 12, 2024, Rebrovich was transitioned to defensive line coach. He was fired by Green Bay on January 17, 2025.

=== Buffalo Bills (second stint) ===
On February 4, 2025, the Buffalo Bills hired Rebrovich to serve as their assistant defensive line coach. Rebrovich was retained by new head coach Joe Brady for the 2026 season as a senior defensive assistant.

== Personal life ==
Rebrovich is a native of Clarence, New York, and graduated from Clarence High School in 1996. He played two years of college football at Alfred State College, before finishing his collegiate football career at Cortland.
