= Defensive coordinator =

Coach responsible for the defense on a gridiron football team

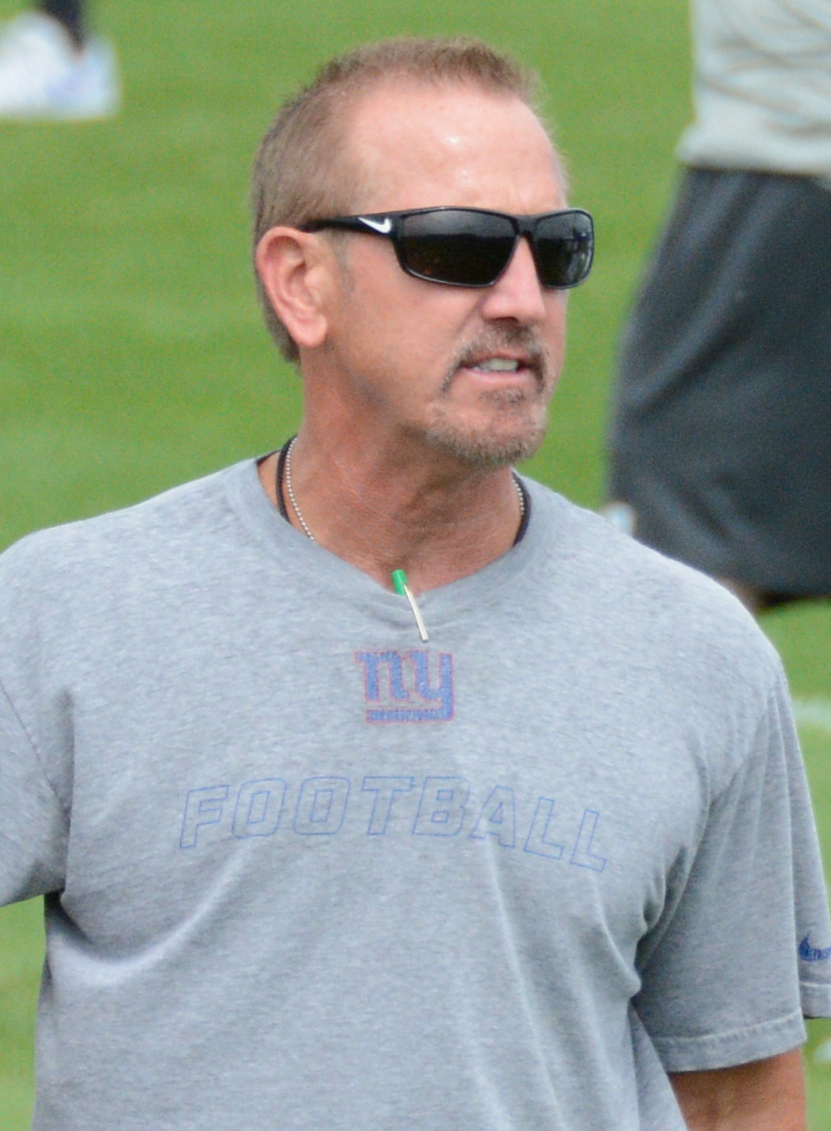
Steve Spagnuolo has won four Super Bowls as a defensive coordinator in the National Football League (NFL).

A defensive coordinator (DC) is a coach responsible for a gridiron football team's defense. Generally, the defensive coordinator, offensive coordinator and special teams coordinator represent the second level of a team's coaching structure, with the head coach being the first level.

The primary role of the defensive coordinator is managing the roster of defensive players, overseeing the assistant coaches, developing the defensive game plan, and calling plays for the defense during the game (though some head coaches with defensive roots may hold play-calling duties instead). Several position coaches work under the defensive coordinator, including defensive line, linebacker, and defensive back coaches.

While the job of a defensive coordinator is largely similar at the collegiate and professional level, college coaches are more involved in the recruitment process. A successful defensive coordinator is often a stepping stone to the position of head coach.

Other major sports with strong delineation between offensive and defensive positions use similar coaching positions. For example, Phil Housley is a defensive coordinator in the National Hockey League, working for the Nashville Predators from 2013 to 2017, the Arizona Coyotes from 2019 to 2022, and the New York Rangers from 2023 to 2025.

== See also ==
- List of current NFL defensive coordinators
