= John Egorugwu =

American football coach (born 1986)

Buffalo Bills
- Title: Inside linebackers coach

Personal information
- Born: May 21, 1986 (age 40); Kansas City, Missouri, U.S.

Career information
- Position: Linebacker
- College: William Jewell
- NFL draft: 2007: undrafted

Career history
- William Jewell (2010–2011) Linebackers coach; Missouri (2012–2014); Graduate assistant (defense) (2012); Graduate assistant (offense) (2013–2014); Missouri State (2015) Wide receivers coach; Baltimore Ravens (2015–2016) Defensive assistant; Buffalo Bills (2017–2020); Defensive quality control coach (2017); Assistant linebackers coach (2018–2020); Vanderbilt (2021) Linebackers coach; New York Giants (2022–2025) Inside linebackers coach; Buffalo Bills (2026–present) Inside linebackers coach

Awards and highlights
- As a coach: 2014 Cotton Bowl Classic; 2015 Citrus Bowl

John Egorugwu (born May 21, 1986) is an American football inside linebackers coach for the Buffalo Bills of the National Football League (NFL). Egorugwu most recently served as the linebackers coach at Vanderbilt in 2021. He has spent time coaching with other NFL teams including the Baltimore Ravens and New York Giants.

== Playing career ==
John Egorugwu was a linebacker for the William Jewell Cardinals from 2004 to 2007. He played in 29 games, had 156 career tackles, 22 tackles for loss, 7.0 sacks, and 2 interception during his time at William Jewell.

== Coaching career ==
=== William Jewell ===
Egorugwu got his start in coaching at his alma mater, William Jewell as their Linebackers coach from 2010 until the end of the 2011 season.

=== Missouri ===
Egorugwu got hired by Missouri as a graduate assistant, working with both the defense in 2012 and offense in 2013 and 2014. During his time in Missouri he won his first bowl game 2014 Cotton Bowl Classic with the team's victory over the Oklahoma State with the final score (41-31). He would win his second bowl game the following year 2015 Citrus Bowl with the team's victory over Minnesota with the final score (33-17).

=== Missouri State ===
On December 18, 2014, Egorugwu was hired by Missouri State as their Wide receivers coach under head coach Dave Steckel.

=== Baltimore Ravens ===
On April 16, 2015, Egorugwu was hired by the Baltimore Ravens as a defensive staff assistant under head coach John Harbaugh.

=== Buffalo Bills ===
On February 2, 2017, Egorugwu was hired by Buffalo Bills as their defensive quality control coach and assistant linebackers coach under head coach Sean McDermott. In 2018, the Bills linebacker group recorded 7 interceptions and tied for most in the league with the New York Giants.

=== Vanderbilt ===
On February 4, 2021, Egorugwu was hired by Vanderbilt as their Linebackers coach under head coach Clark Lea.

=== New York Giants ===
On February 14, 2022, Egorugwu was hired by the New York Giants as their inside linebackers coach under head coach Brian Daboll.

On January 21, 2026, it was announced that Egorugwu would not be retained by the Giants on new head coach John Harbaugh's inaugural staff.

=== Buffalo Bills (second stint) ===
On February 2, 2026, Egorugwu was hired by the Buffalo Bills as the team's inside linebackers coach under head coach Joe Brady.
