= Drew Terrell =

American football coach (born 1991)

Buffalo Bills
- Title: Wide receivers coach

Personal information
- Born: July 25, 1991 (age 35); Mesa, Arizona, U.S.
- Listed height: 5 ft 11 in (1.80 m)
- Listed weight: 181 lb (82 kg)

Career information
- Positions: Wide receiver, return specialist
- High school: Hamilton (Chandler, Arizona)
- College: Stanford (2009-2012)

Career history
- Virginia Tech (2014) Graduate assistant; Michigan (2015–2017) Graduate assistant; Carolina Panthers (2018–2019) Offensive quality control coach; Washington Football Team / Commanders (2020–2022); Assistant wide receivers coach (2020); Wide receivers coach (2021–2022); Arizona Cardinals (2023–2025) Passing game coordinator & wide receivers coach; Buffalo Bills (2026–present) Wide receivers coach

Andrew Devon Terrell (born July 25, 1991) is an American professional football coach who is the wide receivers coach for the Buffalo Bills of the National Football League (NFL). He previously served as an assistant coach for the Arizona Cardinals, Washington Commanders, Carolina Panthers, University of Michigan and Virginia Tech.

He played college football at Stanford, where he earned three consecutive All-Pac-12 honorable mentions as a punt returner from 2010-2012.

== Early life ==
Terrell was a four-year letterman at wide receiver and punt returner at Stanford University from 2009 to 2012, earning honorable mention All-Pac-12 as a returner three times. He was a part of four consecutive bowl teams with the Cardinal, and was Stanford's leading receiver in 2012, when the team finished with a 12-2 record and won both the Pac-12 championship and the Rose Bowl. In his 4-year career at Stanford, Terrell played in 47 games, recording 44 receptions for 557 yards and five touchdowns. He also returned 71 punts for 797 yards and one touchdown.

== Coaching career ==
=== Early career ===
Terrell began his coaching career at Virginia Tech in 2014 as a graduate assistant at the request of Hokies wide receivers coach Aaron Moorehead, who was a graduate assistant at Stanford when Terrell was playing. He went on to join the coaching staff at Michigan as a graduate assistant in 2015 under his former college coach Jim Harbaugh.

=== Carolina Panthers ===
On February 13, 2018, Terrell was hired by the Carolina Panthers as an offensive quality control coach under head coach Ron Rivera.

=== Washington Football Team / Commanders ===
In 2020, Terrell was hired by the Washington Football Team as their assistant wide receivers coach. He was promoted to wide receivers coach in 2021 after Jim Hostler was promoted to senior offensive assistant. On February 24, 2023, Terrell and the Commanders parted ways.

=== Arizona Cardinals ===
On March 1, 2023, Terrell was hired by the Arizona Cardinals as their passing game coordinator and wide receivers coach under head coach Jonathan Gannon.

=== Buffalo Bills ===
On February 2, 2026, Terrell was hired by the Buffalo Bills as their wide receivers coach under head coach Joe Brady.
