= Tracy Smith (American football) =

American football coach

Carolina Panthers
- Title: Special teams coordinator

Career history
- Stephen F. Austin (2004) Tight ends coach & video coordinator; LSU (2005) Offensive graduate assistant; Utah State (2006–2008) Tight ends coach; Cleveland Browns (2009–2010) Assistant special teams coach; Seattle Seahawks (2011) Coaching assistant; San Francisco 49ers (2012–2014) Assistant special teams coach; Oakland Raiders (2015–2017) Assistant special teams coach; Houston Texans (2018–2019) Assistant special teams coach; Houston Texans (2020) Special teams coordinator; Seattle Seahawks (2021–2023) Assistant special teams coach; Carolina Panthers (2024–present) Special teams coordinator

Tracy Smith is an American professional football coach who is currently the special teams coordinator for the Carolina Panthers of the National Football League (NFL).

== Early life ==
Smith grew up in Beaumont, Texas.

== Coaching career ==
=== San Francisco 49ers ===
On February 17, 2012, Smith was hired by the San Francisco 49ers as a special teams assistant.

=== Oakland Raiders ===
On January 27, 2015, Smith was hired by the Oakland Raiders as an assistant special teams coach.

=== Houston Texans ===
On January 19, 2018, Smith was hired by the Houston Texans as an assistant special teams coach.

On July 21, 2020, Smith was promoted as the special teams coordinator.

=== Seattle Seahawks (second stint) ===
On March 3, 2021, Smith was hired again by the Seahawks as an assistant special teams coach.

=== Carolina Panthers ===
On February 8, 2024, Smith was hired as the new special teams coordinator for the Carolina Panthers.
