= Frank Ross (American football) =

American football coach (born 1987)

Houston Texans
- Title: Special teams coordinator

Personal information
- Born: July 24, 1987 (age 39); Youngstown, Ohio, U.S.

Career information
- Position: Wide receiver
- High school: Canfield
- College: John Carroll

Career history

Coaching
- John Carroll (2013–2014); Quarterbacks coach (2013); Special teams coordinator & running backs coach (2014); Indianapolis Colts (2018–2020) Assistant special teams coach; Houston Texans (2021–present) Special teams coordinator

Operations
- New England Patriots (2011–2012) Scouting assistant; New England Patriots (2015–2017) Pro Scout

Frank Ross (born July 24, 1987) is an American professional football coach and executive who is the special teams coordinator for the Houston Texans of the National Football League (NFL).

== Career ==
Ross was part of the 2005 Canfield High School state runner-up football team. He later played for the John Carroll Blue Streaks and became the program's all-time leader in receptions. On November 10, 2007, he was declared the John Carroll football player of the week.

Ross was a scouting assistant for the New England Patriots from 2011 to 2012. He served two seasons on the coaching staff at John Carroll as a quarterbacks coach in 2013 and a special teams coordinator & running backs coach in 2014.

In 2015, he rejoined the Patriots as a pro scout and was part of the Patriots' Super Bowl championship in 2017. He stayed with the team until he was hired by the Indianapolis Colts as an assistant special teams coach in 2018.

=== Houston Texans ===
The Houston Texans interview and later hired him as a special teams coordinator in 2021. He was retained by Lovie Smith as the special teams coordinator for the 2022 season. In 2023 he was retained by DeMeco Ryans in the same position.

== Personal life ==
Ross is also known for his hair-cutting expertise and often cuts the hair of various players. He later participated in a community event called, "Coach's Cuts" where he cut hair for the Star of Hope homeless center.

Ross was a contestant on the November 5th, 2008 episode of the American game show Deal or No Deal. He won $14,000 in a modified "Speed Deal" version of the game.
