= Keleki Latu =

American football player (born 2002)

No. 83 – Buffalo Bills
- Position: Tight end
- Roster status: Active

Personal information
- Born: August 13, 2002 (age 24); Sacramento, California, U.S.
- Listed height: 6 ft 7 in (2.01 m)
- Listed weight: 249 lb (113 kg)

Career information
- High school: Jesuit (Carmichael, California)
- College: California (2021–2022); Nevada (2023); Washington (2024)
- NFL draft: 2025: undrafted

Career history
- Buffalo Bills (2025–present)

Career NFL statistics as of Week 11, 2026
- Receptions: 6
- Receiving yards: 90
- Receiving touchdowns: 1
- Stats at Pro Football Reference

Keleki Latu (born August 13, 2002) is an American professional football tight end for the Buffalo Bills of the National Football League (NFL). He played college football for the California Golden Bears, Nevada Wolf Pack, and Washington Huskies.

== Early life ==
Latu is from Sacramento, California. He and his brother attended Jesuit High School in Carmichael, California, where they played football and rugby union. At Jesuit, he played as a tight end and defensive end, with his senior year being canceled due to COVID-19. A three-star recruit and the 56th-best tight end prospect nationally, he committed to play college football for the California Golden Bears.

== College career ==
As a true freshman at California in 2021, Latu appeared in 10 games and totaled four catches for 48 yards and a touchdown. He then recorded 18 catches for 207 yards and one touchdown while appearing in 12 games during the 2022 season. Latu entered the NCAA transfer portal after the season and transferred to the Nevada Wolf Pack. He caught 14 passes for 179 yards before suffering a season-ending fractured fibula during the 2023 season at Nevada. He transferred to the Washington Huskies for his final season in 2024. There, he had a career-best season, catching 40 passes for 371 yards and a touchdown while being named honorable mention All-Big Ten Conference.

== Professional career ==
Pre-draft measurables
Height	Weight	Arm length	Hand span	Wingspan	40-yard dash	10-yard split	20-yard split	20-yard shuttle	Three-cone drill	Vertical jump	Broad jump	Bench press
6 ft 6 3/4 in (2.00 m)	249 lb (113 kg)	33 5/8 in (0.85 m)	10 1/4 in (0.26 m)	6 ft 10 5/8 in (2.10 m)	4.89 s	1.63 s	2.81 s	4.37 s	7.07 s	30.0 in (0.76 m)	9 ft 1 in (2.77 m)	13 reps
All values from Pro Day

After going unselected in the 2025 NFL draft, Latu signed with the Buffalo Bills as an undrafted free agent. He was waived on August 26, 2025, then re-signed to the practice squad the next day. Latu was elevated to the active roster for the team's Week 11 game against the Tampa Bay Buccaneers. On December 27, he was signed to Buffalo's active roster.

In Week 9 of the 2026 season against the Minnesota Vikings, Latu caught his first career touchdown pass from Josh Allen, in a 23–6 win.

Latu is the first player to wear number 83 for the Bills since Lee Evans; it has historically been issued only to players not expected to make a regular season roster out of deference to Andre Reed.

== Personal life ==
Latu's older brother, Laiatu, is a defensive end for the Indianapolis Colts.
