= List of Buffalo Bills head coaches =

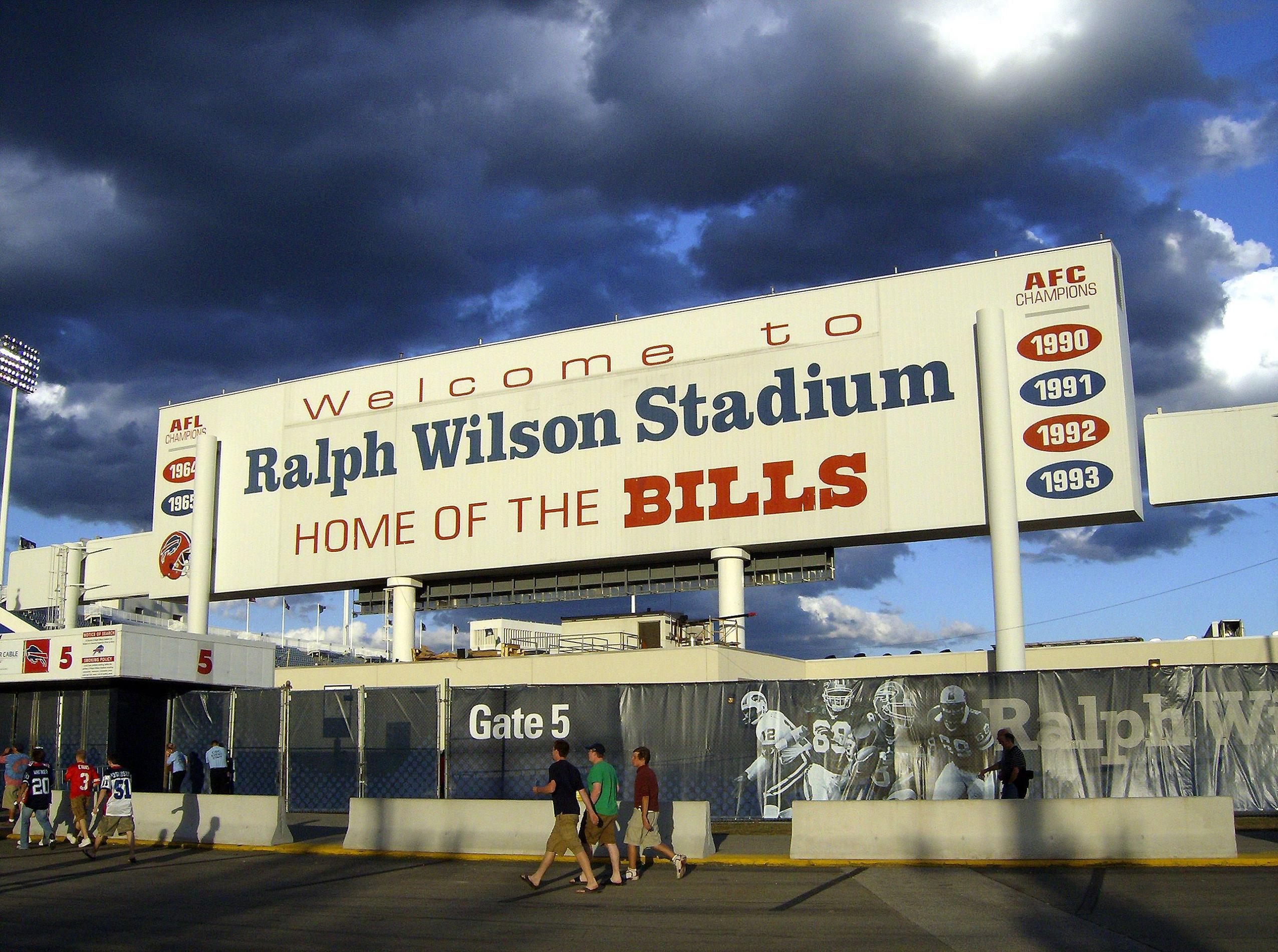
The entrance sign to the home of the Bills, Highmark Stadium (formerly New Era Field and Ralph Wilson Stadium)

The Buffalo Bills are a professional American football team based in the Buffalo, New York metropolitan area. They are members of the Eastern Division of the American Football Conference (AFC) in the National Football League (NFL). The Bills franchise was formed in 1960 as a charter member of the American Football League (AFL), before joining the NFL as part of the AFL-NFL merger of 1970.

There have been 21 head coaches for the Bills franchise. Buster Ramsey became the first head coach of the Buffalo Bills in 1960, serving for two seasons before being fired by Bills owner Ralph Wilson after the 1961 season. In terms of tenure, Marv Levy has coached more games (182) and seasons (12) than any other coach in franchise history. He coached the Bills to four straight AFC Championships from 1990 to 1993, but failed to lead the team to a victory in the Super Bowl. One of Levy's predecessors, Lou Saban, who coached the team on two occasions, led the team to the victories in the AFL championship in 1964 and 1965. Three Bills coaches—Saban, Levy and Chuck Knox—have been named coach of the year by at least one major news organization. Levy and Jim Ringo are the only Bills coaches to have been inducted into the Pro Football Hall of Fame.

There have been six "interim" head coaches in Bills history. First, in 1968, head coach Joe Collier was fired two games into the season and replaced by Bills personnel director Harvey Johnson. Johnson did not serve as head coach the following season. Then, five games into the 1976 season, Saban unexpectedly resigned as head coach. He was replaced by Ringo, the team's offensive line coach. Ringo returned to coach the team again in the 1977 season. In October 1985, Kay Stephenson was fired and replaced by assistant head coach Hank Bullough. Just over a year later, Bullough was himself fired and replaced by Marv Levy, who had previously served as coach of the Kansas City Chiefs. Levy would then serve as Bills head coach for the next 12 seasons. In 2016, Anthony Lynn replaced Rex Ryan for the final game of the season.

Following Levy's retirement, the Bills experienced limited success under a series of successive head coaches. Wade Phillips, the Bills' defensive coordinator for the last three years under Levy, took over head coaching duties for the 1998 season. Phillips served as head coach for three seasons, making the playoffs in his first two (He was the last coach to lead the Bills to the playoffs until Sean McDermott became coach in 2017). After Phillips' departure following the 2000 season, Gregg Williams was named head coach. Williams served as coach for three seasons. At the end of the 2003 season, Williams' contract was not renewed. Mike Mularkey was named as the new head coach for the 2004 season, leading the Bills to their first winning season since 1999. The Bills experienced less success under Mularkey during 2005, and Mularkey resigned as head coach at the completion of the 2005 season. The Bills then named Dick Jauron as their head coach for the 2006 season. Jauron was the first coach since Phillips' dismissal with prior head coaching experience, having previously served as head coach of the Chicago Bears and interim head coach of the Detroit Lions. Jauron coached the Bills to three consecutive 7–9 seasons before being fired on November 17, 2009, nine games into the 2009 season. Defensive Coordinator Perry Fewell was named as the interim head coach, going 3–4 to finish out the season before all of the Bills coaching staff was fired on January 4, 2010. On January 19, 2010, the Bills named Chan Gailey as their next head coach; Gailey was fired on December 31, 2012. In January 2013, Doug Marrone was appointed. He exercised his option to leave in January 2015 following the change of ownership to Kim and Terrence Pegula and was replaced by Rex Ryan. Rex Ryan was fired from the team on December 27, 2016. Anthony Lynn served as interim head coach until January 11, when the team hired Sean McDermott to serve in the role on a permanent basis. McDermott's tenure as head coach saw the team qualify for the playoffs eight times. Despite the success, McDermott was fired on January 19, 2026, after nine seasons with the team. The Bills then named Joe Brady, the offensive coordinator for the past three seasons under McDermott, as their next head coach, on January 27, 2026.

== Key ==
#	Number of coaches ^{[A]}
GC	Games coached
W	Wins
L	Losses
T	Ties
Win%	Winning percentage ^{[B]}
†	Elected into the Pro Football Hall of Fame as a coach
‡	Elected into the Pro Football Hall of Fame as a player
*	Spent entire AFL/NFL head coaching career with the Bills
**	Two coaching tenures for Lou Saban
^	Two coaching tenures for Harvey Johnson

== Coaches ==
#	Image	Name	Term (Note: Each year is linked to an article about that particular NFL season.)			Regular season					Playoffs			Accomplishments	Ref.
#	Image	Name	Yrs	First	Last	GC	W	L	T	Win%	GC	W	L	Accomplishments	Ref.
1		Buster Ramsey*	2	1960	1961	28	11	16	1	.411	—				
2		Lou Saban	4	1962	1965	56	36	17	3	.670	3	2	1	2 AFL Championships (1964, 1965); 3 AFL playoff berths 2 UPI AFL Coach of the Year Awards (1964, 1965)	
3		Joe Collier*	3	1966	1968 (Note: The Bills fired coach Joe Collier after an 0–2 start in 1968. Defensive backfield coach Harvey Johnson was promoted to interim head coach, where he went 1–10–1 to finish the year.)	30	13	16	1	.450	1	0	1	1 AFL playoff berth	
4		Harvey Johnson	1	1968		12	1	10	1	.125	—				
5		John Rauch	2	1969	1970	28	7	20	1	.268	—				
–		Harvey Johnson	1	1971		14	1	13	0	.071	—				
–		Lou Saban	5	1972	1976 (Note: Bills head coach Lou Saban resigned after the fifth game of the season, with the Bills struggling at 2–3. Offensive line coach Jim Ringo took over, but would not win a game for the rest of the year.)	61	32	28	1	.533	1	0	1	1 Playoff berth	
6		Jim Ringo ^{‡}	2	1976	1977	23	3	20	0	.130	—				
7		Chuck Knox	5	1978	1982	73	37	36	0	.507	3	1	2	1 AFC East Championship (1980); 2 Playoff berths 1 AP NFL Coach of the Year Award (1980); 1 Sporting News NFL Coach of the Year Award (1980); 1 Pro Football Weekly NFL Coach of the Year Award (1980)	
8		Kay Stephenson*	3	1983	1985 (Note: Head coach Kay Stephenson was fired after an 0–4 start. Defensive coordinator Hank Bullough took over, going 2–10 for the remainder of the season.)	36	10	26	0	.278	—				
9		Hank Bullough	2	1985	1986 (Note: After a 6-point Week Nine loss to Tampa Bay, the Bills fired coach Hank Bullough, and hired former Kansas City coach Marv Levy to replace him.)	21	4	17	0	.190	—				
10		Marv Levy ^{†}	12	1986	1997	182	112	70	0	.615	19	11	8	Inducted Pro Football Hall of Fame (2001); 4 AFC Championships (1990, 1991, 1992, 1993); 6 AFC East Championships (1988, 1989, 1990, 1991, 1993, 1995); 8 Playoff berths 1 Sporting News NFL Coach of the Year Award (1988); 2 UPI NFL Coach of the Year Awards (1988, 1993)	
11		Wade Phillips	3	1998	2000	48	29	19	0	.604	2	0	2	2 Playoff berths	
12		Gregg Williams	3	2001	2003	48	17	31	0	.354	—				
13		Mike Mularkey	2	2004	2005	32	14	18	0	.438	—				
14		Dick Jauron	4	2006	2009 (Note: Dick Jauron was fired on November 17 after a 3–6 start and replaced on an interim basis by defensive coordinator Perry Fewell.)	57	24	33	0	.421	—				
15		Perry Fewell	1	2009		7	3	4	0	.429	—				
16		Chan Gailey	3	2010	2012	48	16	32	0	.333	—				
17		Doug Marrone	2	2013	2014	32	15	17	0	.469	—				
18		Rex Ryan	2	2015	2016 (Note: After a 34–31 overtime loss to the Miami Dolphins in Week 16 eliminated the Bills from playoff contention for a 17th season in a row, Rex Ryan was fired. Anthony Lynn led the team as interim head coach in final the game.)	31	15	16	0	.484	—				
19		Anthony Lynn	1	2016		1	0	1	0	.000	—				
20		Sean McDermott*	9	2017	2025	148	98	50	0	.662	16	8	8	5 AFC East Championships (2020, 2021, 2022, 2023, 2024); 8 Playoff berths	
21		Joe Brady*	1	2026	present	4	8	1	0	.889	—				
Totals			67	1960	2025	1,016	502	510	8	.494	45	22	23		
