= Pete Carmichael Jr. =

American football coach (born 1971)

- Carmichael with the New Orleans Saints in 2009

Buffalo Bills
- Title: Offensive coordinator

Personal information
- Born: October 6, 1971 (age 55); Framingham, Massachusetts, U.S.

Career information
- High school: Medway (Medway, Massachusetts)
- College: Boston College

Career history
- New Hampshire (1994) Assistant offensive line coach; Louisiana Tech (1995–1999) Quarterbacks coach; Cleveland Browns (2000) Tight ends coach & offensive assistant; Washington Redskins (2001) Offensive assistant & quality control coach; San Diego Chargers (2002–2005); Offensive assistant & quality control coach (2002–2003); Assistant wide receivers & quality control coach (2004–2005); New Orleans Saints (2006–2023); Quarterbacks coach (2006); Quarterbacks coach & passing game coordinator (2007–2008); Offensive coordinator (2009–2023); Denver Broncos (2024–2025) Senior offensive assistant; Buffalo Bills (2026–present) Offensive coordinator

Awards and highlights
- Super Bowl champion (XLIV)
- Coaching profile at Pro Football Reference

Peter Edwards Carmichael Jr. (born October 6, 1971) is an American professional football coach who is the offensive coordinator for the Buffalo Bills of the National Football League (NFL). He spent 18 seasons as an offensive assistant for the New Orleans Saints, the last 15 of those as offensive coordinator. He was part of the Saints team that won Super Bowl XLIV.

== Coaching ==
=== College ===
Carmichael began his coaching career as the assistant offensive line coach at the University of New Hampshire in 1994, with the Wildcats winning the Yankee Conference championship. Followed by being the quarterbacks coach at Louisiana Tech University from 1995 to 1999.

=== Early NFL years ===
Carmichael's first NFL job was in 2000 when he was the tight ends coach for the Cleveland Browns. The following year Carmichael became the quality control coach for the Washington Redskins. He would hold the same position with the San Diego Chargers in 2002 until he was promoted in 2004 to the team's assistant wide receivers coach.

=== New Orleans Saints ===
Carmichael worked closely with Drew Brees throughout his career with the Saints. Both arrived in New Orleans from San Diego in 2006 when Carmichael became the team's quarterbacks coach. In 2008, Carmichael added on the title of passing game coordinator. He was named offensive coordinator on January 12, 2009, replacing Doug Marrone, who left to become the head coach of the Syracuse Orange.

Throughout his time with the Saints, he was an important figure in the planning and preparation of the team's offensive attack, which ranked first in the league in yardage in his first six seasons and in the top nine every year during his tenure as offensive coordinator. During this period, the club's 14-year streak of finishing in the top 10 in offense is the third-longest since the AFL–NFL merger in 1970. Between 2009 and 2017, the Saints had top-five offenses in eight of nine seasons.

During the 2013 season, despite the 23–15 loss to the eventual Super Bowl XLVIII champion Seattle Seahawks in the Divisional Round, of the Seahawks' three postseason opponents en route to their Super Bowl title, the Saints committed just one turnover against the vaunted Legion of Boom defense, compared to the San Francisco 49ers committing three in the NFC Championship Game and the Denver Broncos turning it over four times in the Super Bowl. New Orleans also gained the most amount of total yards on offense with 409, with San Francisco and Denver recording 308 and 306 yards respectively, and also the greatest number of passing yards with 301, compared to the 49ers managing 147 yards through the air and the Broncos with 279 passing yards.

After offensive struggles following the departures of Drew Brees and Sean Payton, in 2020 and 2021 respectively, and three consecutive seasons without making the postseason, Carmichael was fired from the Saints after the 2023 season on January 16, 2024.

=== Denver Broncos ===
On February 14, 2024, Carmichael was hired as senior offensive assistant coach of the Denver Broncos, reuniting him with Broncos head coach Sean Payton.

=== Buffalo Bills ===
On January 31, 2026, Carmichael was announced as the offensive coordinator of the Buffalo Bills under new head coach Joe Brady.

== Personal life ==
Carmichael grew up in Medway, Massachusetts and attended Boston College. His late father, Pete Carmichael Sr., was a football coach with more than 40 years of coaching experience at the high school, college, and NFL levels, including 18 years at Boston College and nine years in the NFL with the Jacksonville Jaguars, Chicago Bears, and Cleveland Browns.
