= Ja'Mori Maclin =

American football player (born 2001)

No. 84 – Buffalo Bills
- Position: Wide receiver
- Roster status: Practice squad

Personal information
- Born: St. Louis, Missouri, U.S.
- Listed height: 5 ft 11 in (1.80 m)
- Listed weight: 183 lb (83 kg)

Career information
- High school: Kirkwood (Kirkwood, Missouri)
- College: Missouri (2020–2021); North Texas (2022–2023); Kentucky (2024–2025)
- NFL draft: 2026: undrafted

Career history
- Buffalo Bills (2026–present)*
- * Offseason or practice squad member only

Awards and highlights
- Second-team All-AAC (2023)
- Stats at Pro Football Reference

Ja'Mori Maclin is an American professional football wide receiver for the Buffalo Bills of the National Football League (NFL). He played college football for the Missouri Tigers, North Texas Mean Green, and Kentucky Wildcats.

== Early life ==
Maclin attended Kirkwood High School in Kirkwood, Missouri. He finished his high school career with 113 receptions for 2,029 yards and 22 touchdowns. A three-star recruit, he committed to play college football at the University of Missouri over offers from Iowa, Indiana, and Arizona State.

== College career ==
=== Missouri ===
Maclin played sparingly in two seasons with Missouri, recording one reception for five yards. On October 20, 2021, Maclin entered the transfer portal.

=== North Texas ===
Before the start of the 2022 season, Maclin announced that he would be transferring to the University of North Texas. In his first season with the Mean Green, he recorded 16 receptions for 380 yards and two touchdowns. The following year, Maclin caught 57 receptions for 1,004 yards and 11 touchdowns. Against Temple, he caught six passes for a career-high 163 yards and two touchdowns. Following the conclusion of the 2023 season, Maclin entered the transfer portal for a second time.

=== Kentucky ===
On December 13, 2023, Maclin announced that he would transfer to the University of Kentucky to play for the Wildcats.

=== Statistics ===
Year	Team	Games	Receiving			
Year	Team	GP	Rec	Yards	Avg	TD
2020	Missouri	1	1	5	5.0	0
2021	Missouri	DNP				
2022	North Texas	14	16	380	23.8	2
2023	North Texas	12	57	1,004	17.6	11
2024	Kentucky	12	13	313	24.1	4
2025	Kentucky	10	13	189	14.5	0
Career		49	100	1,891	18.9	17

== Professional career ==
Pre-draft measurables
Height	Weight	Arm length	Hand span	Wingspan	40-yard dash	10-yard split	20-yard split	20-yard shuttle	Three-cone drill	Vertical jump	Broad jump	Bench press
5 ft 10 3/4 in (1.80 m)	183 lb (83 kg)	29 5/8 in (0.75 m)	9 3/8 in (0.24 m)	5 ft 10 1/2 in (1.79 m)	4.54 s	1.54 s	2.60 s	4.18 s	7.31 s	33.5 in (0.85 m)	9 ft 10 in (3.00 m)	11 reps
All values from Pro Day

On May 8, 2026, Maclin signed with the Buffalo Bills as an undrafted free agent. On August 30, Maclin was waived by Buffalo as a part of final roster cuts; he was re-signed to the team's practice squad the next day.

== Personal life ==
Maclin is the cousin of former Pro Bowl wide receiver Jeremy Maclin.
