= Jude Bowry =

American football player (born 2003)

No. 74 – Buffalo Bills
- Position: Offensive tackle
- Roster status: Active

Personal information
- Born: August 19, 2003 (age 23); San Francisco, California, U.S.
- Listed height: 6 ft 5 in (1.96 m)
- Listed weight: 314 lb (142 kg)

Career information
- High school: St. Frances (Baltimore, Maryland)
- College: Boston College (2022–2025)
- NFL draft: 2026: 4th round, 102nd overall pick

Career history
- Buffalo Bills (2026–present)

Career NFL statistics as of 2026
- Games played: 1
- Stats at Pro Football Reference

Jude Bowry (born August 19, 2003) is an American professional football offensive tackle for the Buffalo Bills of the National Football League (NFL). He played college football for the Boston College Eagles and was selected by the Bills in the fourth round of the 2026 NFL draft.

== Early life ==
Bowry was born on August 19, 2003. Bowry originally attended Northwest High School in his hometown of Germantown, before transferring to Saint Frances Academy in Baltimore. At Saint Frances, he played football as an offensive lineman, being ranked the top offensive tackle in the state by recruiting services. In high school, he stood at 6 feet 5 inches (1.96 m) and weighed 280 pounds (130 kg). A three-star recruit, he committed to play college football for the Boston College Eagles.

== College career ==
As a true freshman at Boston College in 2022, Bowry appeared in seven games, serving as the team's starting right tackle in games against Wake Forest and UConn. He redshirted as a sophomore in 2023 while appearing in three games. In 2024, Bowry became the team's starting left tackle and started all 12 regular season games, allowing only two sacks while receiving a pass blocking grade of 75.7 from Pro Football Focus (PFF). As a redshirt junior in 2025, he was named team captain and started nine games at left tackle. Although he had remaining eligibility, Bowry opted to declare for the 2026 NFL draft. He finished his collegiate career with 31 games played, 23 as a starter. Bowry was invited to the 2026 Senior Bowl.

== Professional career ==
Pre-draft measurables
Height	Weight	Arm length	Hand span	Wingspan	40-yard dash	10-yard split	20-yard split	Vertical jump	Broad jump	Bench press
6 ft 5 1/8 in (1.96 m)	314 lb (142 kg)	33 3/4 in (0.86 m)	10 3/4 in (0.27 m)	6 ft 10 1/4 in (2.09 m)	5.08 s	1.75 s	2.94 s	34.5 in (0.88 m)	9 ft 7 in (2.92 m)	24 reps
All values from NFL Combine/Pro Day

Bowry was selected by the Buffalo Bills in the fourth round with the 102nd overall pick in the 2026 NFL draft. The selection was received from the Las Vegas Raiders, along with a 2027 seventh-round pick, in exchange for the 101st overall pick (Jermod McCoy).
