= Special teams coordinator =

Coach responsible for the special teams on a gridiron football team

A special teams coordinator (STC) is a coach responsible for a gridiron football team's special teams unit. Generally, the special teams coordinator, offensive coordinator, and defensive coordinator represent the second level of a team's coaching structure, with the head coach being the first level. The primary role of the special teams coordinator is managing the roster of special teams players, overseeing the assistant coaches, developing the special teams game plan, and calling plays for the special teams during the game.

Unlike offensive or defensive coordinators, special teams do not usually employ individual position coaches, so special teams coordinators are directly responsible for the management and development of a team's kickers, kickoff specialists, punters, holders, long snappers, return specialists, upbacks, gunners, and jammers.

== See also ==
- List of current NFL special teams coordinators
