= Play calling system =

System for calling plays in American football

A play calling system in American football is the specific language and methods used to call offensive plays.

It is distinct from the play calling philosophy, which is concerned with overall strategy: whether a team favors passing or running, whether a team seeks to speed up or slow down play, what part of the field passes should target, and so on. The play calling system comprises tactics for making calls for individual plays and communicating those decisions to the players.

== Overview ==
In any football play, each of the team's eleven players on offense has a specific, scripted task. Success requires that players' tasks mesh into an effective play. A team maximizes the difficulty for the opposition by having a wide variety of plays, which means that players' tasks vary on different plays. A play calling system informs each player of his task in the current play.

There are constraints in designing a play calling system. The 40-second play clock means a team has 30 seconds or less from the end of one play to prepare for the next play. A complicated play calling system that lets a team tailor a play more precisely is harder for players to memorize and communicate. Noise from the fans in the stadium can interfere with communication, sometimes deliberately. To the extent the opposition can intercept and understand the call, it can prepare for it better.

The design of a play calling system answers the following questions:

- Who decides which play to run? The play may be chosen by the head coach, by an assistant coach (the offensive coordinator), or by the quarterback on the field.
- How is the choice sent onto the field? The team can send a substitute player onto the field who knows the play the coaches want to run. Personnel on the sidelines can call plays using hand signals or pictures. If the team has called a time-out, the coaches can give players detailed instructions; but there are only three time-outs per half, and they are usually needed for tactical reasons. In the NFL, a player is in radio contact with the sidelines for a defined interval before each play.
- How is the play relayed to the other players? Typically, players gather into a huddle to hear the play call from the quarterback. However, in the no-huddle offense, the players go directly to their positions and learn their assignments there, either audibly from the quarterback or directly from the sidelines. The no-huddle offense aims to direct the offense and start the play before the defense is completely ready. A huddle can communicate two consecutive plays, enabling the team to omit the huddle before the second play.
- How are the plays coded? Not only the specific code words, but the decision on what information is coded, is made in advance. Three approaches to calling plays are set out below.
- How is the play modified? The defense may send substitutes into the game, and they may use a different formation from the one the offense anticipates, creating mismatches between opposing players. Tailoring the play to exploit advantages is usually done by audible signal of the quarterback; coaches on the sidelines can usually do no more than call time-out if they sense the play is certain to fail. The play calling system must work out in advance what latitude the quarterback has to modify the play or even substitute a completely different play; players have to be aware to what extent their assignments might be changed on the fly.
- When is the ball snapped? If the play calling system informs the linemen exactly when in the quarterback's cadence the center will snap the ball, the linemen can face forward and listen for the correct moment to cross the line of scrimmage, while the defensive line has to watch and react. The element of surprise may let pass receivers run their routes and minimize their opponents' ability to block them.

The words in the quarterback's cadence do not always have a specific meaning. Sometimes a fake signal is called out, to confuse the other team. Other times, instead of a traditional color, number, or name, the purpose of the cadence is to help all the players coordinate their first movement, with Cowboys quarterback Dak Prescott's choice of "Here we go!" being just as effective for that purpose as chanting a code name such as "Blue forty-two".

== Specific play coding systems ==
Three general approaches to play calling dominate the National Football League:

=== West Coast system ===
In the West Coast system, all plays have code names. They indicate the specific formation and tell players where to line up. This code name is followed by modifiers that communicate variations on the play. For running plays, the modifier specifies the blocking scheme and the path that the primary ball carrier takes during the run, usually indicating which of nine numbered gaps, or holes, between offensive-line players he aims for in his run. For passing plays, the modifier indicates what pass route each player is supposed to take.

Examples

Here are some plays from one specific West Coast playbook, and what the names mean:

- Red Right 30 Pull Trap: "Red Right" specifies the pro set formation, with three receivers and two backs. The receivers include a split end to the left, a tight end, and a flanker to the right. The backs consist of a halfback and a fullback split two yards apart and two yards behind the quarterback. The fullback is lined up on the strong side (the side of the formation with the tight end) behind the right tackle, while the halfback is lined up behind the left tackle. In "30", the "3" specifies a toss play: The quarterback delivers the ball to the halfback with an underhanded toss. The "0" specifies the hole the halfback will run toward. (The "0-hole" is the gap between the center and right guard). "Pull trap" describes a blocking scheme: The backside guard (the one away from the flow of the play) will "pull" out from his normal position to "trap block", which means he leads the running back through the hole and blocks the linebacker back towards the backside of the play.
- FB West Right Slot 372 Y Stick: "FB West Right Slot" is the formation. FB indicates that the fullback is playing out of his normal position. West Right indicates that the fullback would line up immediately to the right of, and one step back from, the tight end, who is lined up on the right. Slot indicates that the flanker, who usually plays on the same side as the tight end, but split wide, is instead lined up on the left, in the "slot" between the split end and left tackle. In "372", the "3" indicates that the quarterback will make a shorter, three-step drop rather than the standard five-step drop. The "7" is one of a numbered series of passing plays, all based around using the halfback to block on the weak side (away from the tight end). The "2" indicates a blocking scheme, giving each blocker his assignment. "Y Stick" describes the pass route to be run: the "Y" receiver (the tight end) will be the primary receiver and run a stick route: he will run forward, fading slightly towards the center of the field for six yards, and then depending on the coverage, he'll suddenly change course, breaking either back towards the quarterback or straight for the right sideline.

History

The West Coast system has its roots in the system devised by Paul Brown as the head coach of the Cleveland Browns and Cincinnati Bengals. It became known as the West Coast system when Brown's protege Bill Walsh used a similar scheme as head coach of the San Francisco 49ers during their success of the 1980s and 1990s. The West Coast system was designed alongside the West Coast offense, though it is not confined to that offense.

=== Coryell system ===
The heart of the system devised by Don Coryell is a three-digit number that gives assignments to each of three pass receivers; for instance, the split end, the tight end, and the flanker, in that order; or the leftmost receiver, middle receiver, and right receiver, in that order. Each digit is a code for one of nine passing routes the receiver is to run, based on a "route tree". Some routes include a change of direction with which to throw off the defender covering the receiver. Through the route tree, the quarterback knows where each receiver will be and can quickly scan to see who is most open.

The nine numbered passing routes tell a receiver to run as follows when the ball is snapped:

1. Flat route: Run straight toward the closest sideline.
2. Slant route: Run at a 45° angle toward the center of the field.
3. Hitch route or comeback: Run down the field then veer toward the sideline.
4. Curl route or buttonhook: Run down the field then veer toward the middle of the field.
5. Out route or jet: Run down the field and at a set point cut straight toward the sideline.
6. Drag route or drag or in: Run down the field and at a set point cut straight toward the middle of the field.
7. Corner route or flag: Run down the field and at a set point cut toward the sideline at a 45° angle.
8. Post route: Run down the field and at a set point cut toward the middle of the field at a 45° angle.
9. Fly route or go or streak: Run straight down the field as far as possible, parallel to the sideline.

The Coryell system is primarily concerned with efficiently devising pass plays, an important factor in the Air Coryell offense. It allows quick and unambiguous communication with each receiver on a passing play. However, if there are more than three receivers or more than 9 pass routes, or to assign a route to additional players, the system must be modified, as done in the West Coast system, reducing the efficiency advantage. In such a modified system, the quarterback might call, "896 H-Shallow F-Curl", assigning numbered routes to the three receivers (the split end, the tight end, and the flanker), while "H-Shallow" and "F-Curl" refer to routes run by the halfback and fullback.

=== Erhardt–Perkins system ===
The above two approaches give specific assignments to key players. In contrast, the Erhardt–Perkins system is based on loose "concepts" that adapt to a variety of personnel packages and formations. Given a set of eleven players on offense and their initial formation, the quarterback gives the code name for a play concept that is to be run. Players do not simply learn to receive and execute their assignments; they learn the entire playbook and know what every player does on every play. A player can be lined up in a formation other than his usual one to exploit a mismatch with the defense. (For example, a strong and large tight end can be lined up against a smaller cornerback, or a speedy wide receiver matched with a slower linebacker.) The player must know what his task is in his new position. Every player aims to be interchangeable with every other player, as no player is tied to any one specific route or assignment on any play.

A typical Erhardt–Perkins concept assigns each player a task based on his initial location. For example, "Ghost" is a three-receiver concept: the outside receiver runs a vertical or fly route, the middle receiver runs an 8-yard out route, and the inside receiver runs a flat route. "Ghost" works in any personnel package or formation; it can be run with a five wide receiver set in a spread formation, or "base personnel" in the I formation where the fullback motions into the slot position.

The Erhardt–Perkins system is more flexible than the other two systems. The play call is simple and brief. The team can use the remaining time on the play clock not to assign instructions but to study the defense and adapt its plan. The Erhardt–Perkins system works well with the no-huddle offense. The offense can run at a faster pace, getting more offensive plays in per game, conserving the time on the game clock, and keeping the defense on its heels.

However, the Erhardt–Perkins system requires versatile and intelligent players. The same player may line up as a running back, tight end, or wide receiver on any given play, so players need adequate skills to play several positions. Erhardt–Perkins requires that players memorize the entire playbook. Each player must know every route in every concept, and be able to run each route depending on which position in the formation he occupies. Players who are successful under other play calling systems can become lost in the complexities of Erhardt–Perkins. In 2015, 14-year NFL veteran wide receiver Reggie Wayne asked to be released from the New England Patriots after only 2 pre-season games. It was reported that Wayne thought that the playbook was too complicated to learn.

The Erhardt–Perkins system was developed by Ron Erhardt and Ray Perkins, two assistant coaches who worked under Chuck Fairbanks for the Patriots during the 1970s. The system was later implemented by the New York Giants in 1982 when Perkins was hired as their head coach, and Erhardt as his offensive coordinator. A third coach who followed Perkins and Erhardt from the Patriots to the Giants was defensive assistant Bill Parcells, who succeeded Perkins as head coach. Being primarily a defensive coach, Parcells retained Erhardt as his offensive coordinator and let him continue to use the Erhardt–Perkins offense and its play calling system. The system was disseminated through the league by various members of the Parcells coaching tree, and is used effectively by former Patriots head coach Bill Belichick.

== See also ==
- Sports strategy
