= Offensive coordinator =

Coach responsible for the offense on a gridiron football team

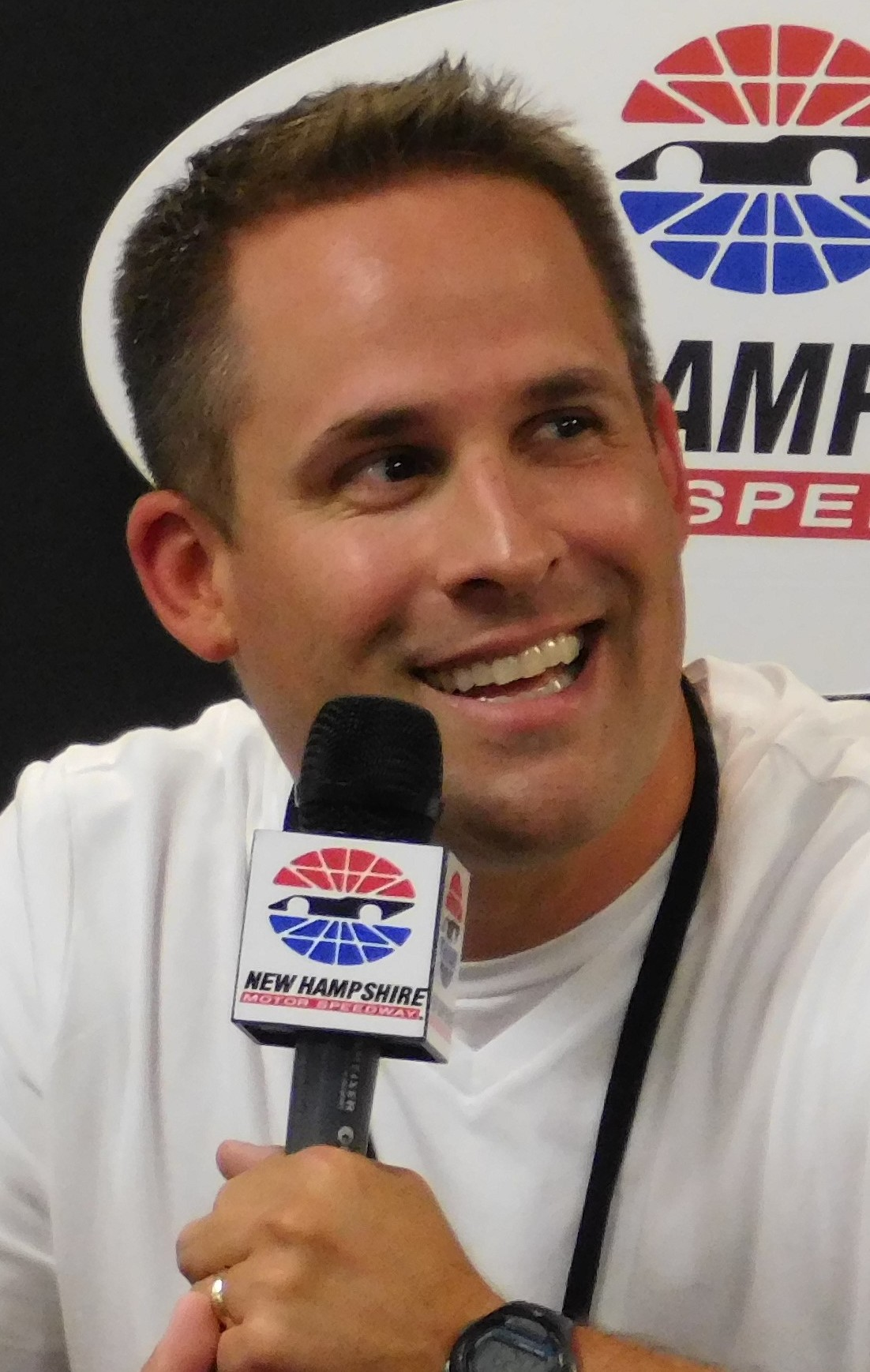
Josh McDaniels has won three Super Bowls as offensive coordinator of the New England Patriots of the National Football League (NFL).

An offensive coordinator (OC) is a coach responsible for a gridiron football team's offense. Generally, the offensive coordinator, defensive coordinator and special teams coordinator represent the second level of coaching structure, with the head coach being the first level.

The primary role of the offensive coordinator is managing the roster of offensive players, overseeing the assistant coaches, developing the offensive game plan, and calling plays for the offense during the game (though some head coaches with offensive roots may hold play-calling duties instead). Several position coaches work under the offensive coordinator, including quarterback, wide receiver, offensive line, running back, and tight end coaches.

While the job of an offensive coordinator is largely similar at the collegiate and professional level, college coaches are more involved in the recruitment process. A successful offensive coordinator is often a stepping stone to the position of head coach. From 2009 to 2019, nearly 40% of head coaches hired in the NFL had previously been offensive coordinators.

== See also ==
- List of current NFL offensive coordinators
