= Joe Brady =

American football player and coach (born 1989)

Buffalo Bills
- Title: Head coach

Personal information
- Born: September 23, 1989 (age 37); Pembroke Pines, Florida, U.S.
- Listed height: 6 ft 3 in (1.91 m)
- Listed weight: 210 lb (95 kg)

Career information
- Position: Wide receiver (No. 33)
- High school: Everglades (Miramar, Florida)
- College: Air Force (2008); William & Mary (2009–2012)

Career history
- William & Mary (2013–2014) Linebackers coach; Penn State (2015–2016) Graduate assistant; New Orleans Saints (2017–2018) Offensive assistant; LSU (2019) Passing game coordinator & wide receivers coach; Carolina Panthers (2020–2021) Offensive coordinator; Buffalo Bills (2022–present); Quarterbacks coach (2022–2023); Interim offensive coordinator (2023); Offensive coordinator (2024–2025); Head coach (2026–present)

Awards and highlights
- CFP national champion (2019); Broyles Award (2019)

Head coaching record
- Regular season: 8–1 (.889)
- Coaching profile at Pro Football Reference

Joseph Brady (born September 23, 1989) is an American professional football coach who is the head coach for the Buffalo Bills of the National Football League (NFL). He previously served as the offensive coordinator for the Bills and Carolina Panthers.

Brady was a passing game coordinator and wide receiver coach for the LSU Tigers during the 2019 season, winning the Broyles Award for the best assistant coach in college football, and an offensive assistant for the New Orleans Saints from 2017 to 2018.

Upon joining Buffalo, Brady started as the quarterbacks coach, rising up the ranks to become offensive coordinator and eventually head coach.

== Early life ==
The son of Joe and Jodi, and brother of Jacey, Brady was born in Hollywood, Florida, and grew up in Pembroke Pines, Florida, where he was a four-year letterwinner as a wide receiver for the football team at Everglades High School.

== Playing career ==
Brady spent four years as a wide receiver for the William & Mary Tribe from 2009 to 2012. As a junior, he appeared in all eleven games.

=== College statistics ===
Season	Team	Conf	Class	Pos	GP	Receiving			
Season	Team	Conf	Class	Pos	GP	Rec	Yds	Avg	TD
2009	William & Mary	CAA	FR	DNP					
2010	William & Mary	CAA	SO	WR	2	0	0	0	0
2011	William & Mary	CAA	JR	WR	11	1	13	13	0
2012	William & Mary	CAA	SR	WR	10	2	21	10.5	0
Career					23	3	34	11.3	0

== Coaching career ==
=== New Orleans Saints ===
In 2017, Brady was hired by the New Orleans Saints as an offensive assistant under head coach Sean Payton.

=== LSU ===
In 2019, Brady joined head coach Ed Orgeron and the LSU Tigers as their passing game coordinator and wide receivers coach. Although Brady never called a play with the Saints, Orgeron and veteran offensive coordinator Steve Ensminger described the young assistant as the implementor of the team's new spread offense. Recognized as the top assistant coach during the season, Brady was honored with the 24th annual Broyles Award. Another highlight of his tenure was Joe Burrow winning the Heisman Trophy. Subsequently, Brady emerged as a leading candidate for numerous offensive coordinator vacancies in the NFL. Initially, he agreed to a three-year contract extension with LSU, but Brady subsequently left for the NFL.

=== Carolina Panthers ===
On January 16, 2020, Brady was hired by the Carolina Panthers as their offensive coordinator under head coach Matt Rhule. The Panthers staff were selected to coach in the 2021 Senior Bowl, but Brady missed the game due to COVID-19 protocols.

On December 5, 2021, Brady was fired by the Panthers.

=== Buffalo Bills ===
On February 4, 2022, Brady was hired by the Buffalo Bills as their quarterbacks coach. On November 14, 2023, the Bills fired offensive coordinator Ken Dorsey following a 5–5 start to the 2023 season, and Brady was promoted to interim offensive coordinator. Under Brady, the Bills' offense went from focused on passing between quarterback Josh Allen and receiver Stefon Diggs to favoring running backs James Cook and Ty Johnson and allowing Allen to run more. This new approach helped Buffalo win six of their final seven games and they finished with an 11–6 record as well as their fourth consecutive AFC East title.

Following the 2023 season, the Bills promoted Brady to full-time offensive coordinator. Brady further refined his philosophy from the previous year, which he dubbed "Everybody Eats," resulting in a league-record 13 offensive players scoring receiving touchdowns en route to the Bills' 13–4 record and an AFC Championship Game appearance in 2024. He was named a finalist for the AP NFL Assistant Coach of the Year Award that season, coming in fourth place. Brady continued to serve as the Bills' offensive coordinator for the 2025 season.

On January 27, 2026, Brady was promoted to head coach after the firing of Sean McDermott.

== Head coaching record ==
Team	Year	Regular season					Postseason			
Team	Year	Won	Lost	Ties	Win %	Finish	Won	Lost	Win %	Result
BUF	2026	8	1	0	.889	TBD in AFC East	—	—	—	
Total		8	1	0	.889		–	–	–	

== Personal life ==
Brady and his wife Lauren have two children.

Brady graduated from William & Mary with a B.B.A. & B.S., and from Penn State with an M.Ed.
