= 2024 Buffalo Bills season =

65th season in franchise history

- Owner: Terry and Kim Pegula
- General manager: Brandon Beane
- Head coach: Sean McDermott
- Offensive coordinator: Joe Brady
- Defensive coordinator: Bobby Babich
- Home stadium: Highmark Stadium

Results
- Record: 13–4
- Division place: 1st AFC East
- Playoffs: Won Wild Card Playoffs (vs. Broncos) 31–7; Won Divisional Playoffs (vs. Ravens) 27–25; Lost AFC Championship (at Chiefs) 29–32
- All-Pros: QB Josh Allen (2nd team)
- Pro Bowlers: QB Josh Allen; RB James Cook; T Dion Dawkins; C Connor McGovern

Uniform
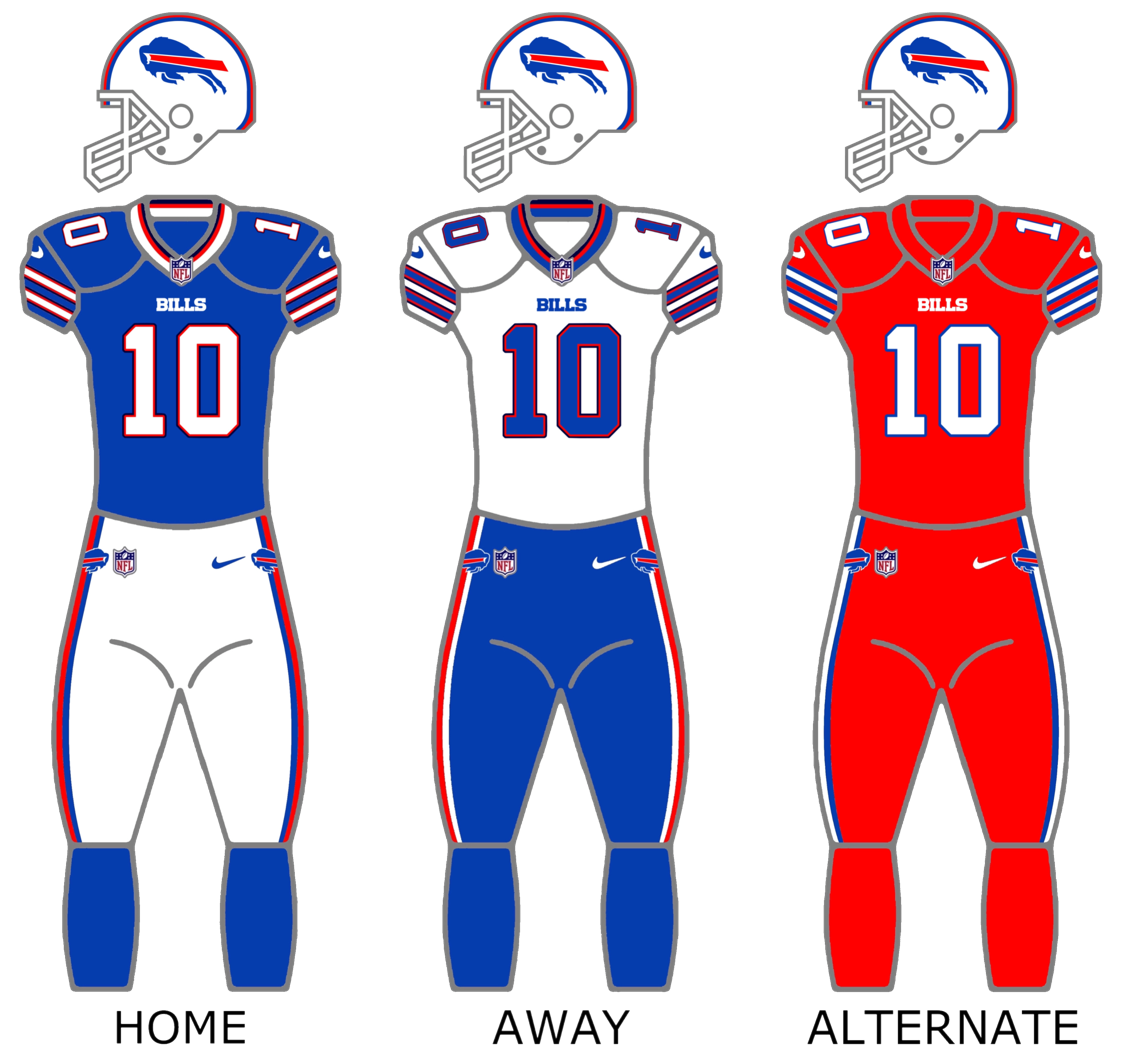

The 2024 season was the Buffalo Bills' 55th in the National Football League (NFL), their 65th overall, their tenth full season under the ownership of Terry and Kim Pegula, and their eighth under the head coach/general manager tandem of Sean McDermott and Brandon Beane.

This was their first season since 2019 without wide receiver Stefon Diggs, as he was traded to the Houston Texans. The team also released several veterans such as center Mitch Morse, cornerback Tre'Davious White, and safety Jordan Poyer, several players who had been key contributors during the McDermott era, among others.

Due to the roster turnover, many outlets went into the season expecting regression for the Bills. Despite this, the Bills finished the regular season with a record of 13–4, their best since the introduction of the 17-game season in 2021, also improving on their 11–6 record from the previous season. The success of the Bills' offense despite the loss of star offensive players was in part because of a shift in offensive philosophy, dubbed "Everybody Eats," in which the offense was spread out among the team's wide receivers, running backs and tight ends along with superstar quarterback Josh Allen. This would prevent opposing defenses from keying on one star. A total of 13 players scored at least one receiving touchdown in 2024, tying an NFL record.

Highlights of the regular season included a Week 11 win over the then-undefeated Kansas City Chiefs that clinched the Bills' sixth consecutive winning season. Two weeks later, they clinched their fifth consecutive AFC East title, as well as their sixth consecutive playoff appearance since 2019, with a Week 13 win over the San Francisco 49ers. This broke the franchise record set when they won four consecutive division titles from 1988–1991. Lastly, a Week 17 win over the New York Jets helped the team secure the no. 2 seed in the AFC for the third consecutive year.

In addition, the Bills won all eight of their home games for the first time since 1990 and scored a franchise-record 525 points, surpassing their total from 2020. The team drew an average home attendance of 70,696 in 8 home games in the 2024 NFL season, a 9.8% increase from the previous year. Josh Allen received the title of NFL Most Valuable Player for his efforts this season, the first Bills player to win the award since Thurman Thomas in 1991.

In the playoffs, the Bills defeated the seventh seed Denver Broncos 31–7 in the Wild Card Round, followed by a close 27–25 win against the third seed Baltimore Ravens in the Divisional Round to advance to the AFC Championship for the first time since 2020. In doing this, the Bills made just their second AFC Championship since 1993. In the championship, they lost to the first seed Kansas City Chiefs for the fourth time over the course of five consecutive postseasons.

== Transactions ==
=== Arrivals ===
Position	Player	2023 team(s)	Date signed
WR	K. J. Hamler	Indianapolis Colts	January 22, 2024
S	Kendall Williamson	Chicago Bears	January 22, 2024
P	Matt Haack	Cleveland Browns	March 6, 2024
QB	Mitchell Trubisky	Pittsburgh Steelers	March 7, 2024
WR	Mack Hollins	Atlanta Falcons	March 14, 2024
LB	Nicholas Morrow	Philadelphia Eagles	March 14, 2024
WR	Curtis Samuel	Washington Commanders	March 15, 2024
DE	Casey Toohill	Washington Commanders	March 19, 2024
S	Mike Edwards	Kansas City Chiefs	March 20, 2024
C	Will Clapp	Los Angeles Chargers	March 22, 2024
DT	Austin Johnson	Los Angeles Chargers	March 28, 2024
DT	DeShawn Williams	Carolina Panthers	March 28, 2024
OT	La'el Collins	Cincinnati Bengals / Dallas Cowboys	April 9, 2024
WR	Quintez Cephus	Detroit Lions (2022)	April 29, 2024
WR	Chase Claypool	Chicago Bears / Miami Dolphins	May 3, 2024
LB	Deion Jones	Carolina Panthers	May 3, 2024
DE	Dawuane Smoot	Jacksonville Jaguars	May 3, 2024
WR	Marquez Valdes-Scantling	Kansas City Chiefs	May 14, 2024
S	Dee Delaney	Tampa Bay Buccaneers	May 16, 2024
S	Kareem Jackson	Houston Texans	July 30, 2024
S	Terrell Burgess	Washington Commanders	July 31, 2024
QB	Ben DiNucci	Denver Broncos	August 13, 2024
WR	Damiere Byrd	Carolina Panthers / Atlanta Falcons	August 13, 2024
WR	Deon Cain	Birmingham Stallions / Philadelphia Eagles	August 13, 2024
QB	Anthony Brown	Baltimore Ravens	August 20, 2024
DT	Zion Logue	Georgia Bulldogs / Atlanta Falcons (2024)	October 1, 2024
DT	Jordan Phillips	Dallas Cowboys (2024)	November 6, 2024
DT	Quinton Jefferson	Cleveland Browns (2024)	November 6, 2024

=== Departures ===
Position	Player	2024 team	Date signed	Notes
DT	Andrew Brown	—	Free Agent	Contracts expired January 21, 2024
OT	Germain Ifedi	Cleveland Browns	April 18, 2024	Contracts expired January 21, 2024
LB	A. J. Klein	—	Retired	Contracts expired January 21, 2024
C	Greg Mancz	—	Free Agent	Contracts expired January 21, 2024
CB	Josh Norman	—	Free Agent	Contracts expired January 21, 2024
WR	Deonte Harty	Baltimore Ravens	April 14, 2024	Released March 6, 2024
RB	Nyheim Hines	Cleveland Browns	March 13, 2024	Released March 6, 2024
C	Mitch Morse	Jacksonville Jaguars	March 13, 2024	Released March 6, 2024
CB	Siran Neal	Miami Dolphins	March 13, 2024	Released March 6, 2024
S	Jordan Poyer	Miami Dolphins	March 18, 2024	Released March 6, 2024
QB	Kyle Allen	Pittsburgh Steelers	March 25, 2024	Contracts expired March 13, 2024
WR	Gabe Davis	Jacksonville Jaguars	March 13, 2024	Contracts expired March 13, 2024
LB	Tyrel Dodson	Seattle Seahawks	March 14, 2024	Contracts expired March 13, 2024
DE	Leonard Floyd	San Francisco 49ers	March 18, 2024	Contracts expired March 13, 2024
DT	Poona Ford	Los Angeles Chargers	March 16, 2024	Contracts expired March 13, 2024
RB	Damien Harris	—	Retired	Contracts expired March 13, 2024
CB	Dane Jackson	Carolina Panthers	March 13, 2024	Contracts expired March 13, 2024
DT	Linval Joseph	Dallas Cowboys	August 21, 2024	Contracts expired March 13, 2024
DE	Shaq Lawson	Carolina Panthers	October 8, 2024	Contracts expired March 13, 2024
LB	Tyler Matakevich	Pittsburgh Steelers	July 17, 2024	Contracts expired March 13, 2024
RB	Latavius Murray	—	Free Agent	Contracts expired March 13, 2024
DT	Jordan Phillips	New York Giants	April 11, 2024	Contracts expired March 13, 2024
DT	Tim Settle	Houston Texans	March 15, 2024	Contracts expired March 13, 2024
WR	Trent Sherfield	Minnesota Vikings	March 14, 2024	Contracts expired March 13, 2024
CB	Tre'Davious White	Los Angeles Rams	March 26, 2024	Released March 13, 2024

=== Trades ===
Position	Arrived	From	Date of trade	Departed
C	2024 5th-round pick	Chicago Bears	March 4, 2024	Ryan Bates
WR	2025 2nd-round pick (via MIN)	Houston Texans	April 3, 2024	Stefon Diggs; 2024 6th-round pick 2025 5th-round pick
CB	Brandon Codrington; 2026 7th-round pick	New York Jets	August 27, 2024	2026 6th-round pick
WR	Amari Cooper; 2025 6th-round pick	Cleveland Browns	October 15, 2024	2025 3rd-round pick 2026 7th-round pick

=== Draft ===
2024 Buffalo Bills draft selections
Round	Selection	Player	Position	College	Notes
1	28	Traded to the Kansas City Chiefs (Note: The Bills traded first- (28th overall), fourth- (133rd overall) and seventh- (248th overall) round selections to the Kansas City Chiefs in exchange for first- (32nd overall), third- (95th overall) and seventh- (221st overall) round selections.)			
1	32	Traded to the Carolina Panthers (Note: The Bills traded first- (32nd overall) and sixth- (200th overall) round selections to the Carolina Panthers in exchange for second- (33rd overall) and fifth- (141st overall) round selections.)			From Chiefs
2	33	Keon Coleman	WR	Florida State	From Panthers
2	60	Cole Bishop	S	Utah	
3	91	Traded to the Green Bay Packers (Note: The Bills traded a third-round selection (91st overall) to the Green Bay Packers in exchange for CB Rasul Douglas and a fifth-round selection (160th overall).)			
3	95	DeWayne Carter	DT	Duke	From Chiefs
4	128	Ray Davis	RB	Kentucky	
4	133	Traded to the Kansas City Chiefs			Compensatory selection
5	141	Sedrick Van Pran-Granger	C	Georgia	From Panthers
5	144	Traded to the Chicago Bears (Note: The Bills traded a fifth-round selection (144th overall) to the Chicago Bears in exchange for a 2025 fourth-round selection.)			From Bears (Note: The Bills traded C Ryan Bates to the Chicago Bears in exchange for a fifth-round selection (144th overall).)
5	160	Edefuan Ulofoshio	LB	Washington	From Packers
5	163	Traded to the Green Bay Packers (Note: The Bills traded a fifth-round selection (163rd overall) to the Green Bay Packers in exchange for fifth- (168th overall) and sixth- (219th overall) round selections.)			
5	168	Javon Solomon	DE	Troy	From Packers
6	189	Traded to the Houston Texans (Note: The Bills traded WR Stefon Diggs, 2024 sixth- (189th overall) and 2025 fifth-round selections to the Houston Texans in exchange for a 2025 second-round selection (via MIN).)			From Rams (Note: The Bills traded a 2023 sixth-round selection to the Los Angeles Rams in exchange for 2023 seventh- and 2024 sixth-round selections (189th overall).)
6	200	Traded to the Carolina Panthers			From Texans (Note: The Bills traded a 2023 sixth-round selection to the Houston Texans in exchange for 2023 seventh- and 2024 sixth-round selections (200th overall).)
6	204	Tylan Grable	OT	UCF	
6	219	Daequan Hardy	CB	Penn State	From Packers
7	221	Travis Clayton	OG	IPPP	From Chiefs
7	248	Traded to the Kansas City Chiefs			

Draft trades

Notes

- The Bills received a fourth-round compensatory selection (133rd overall) for LB Tremaine Edmunds signing with the Chicago Bears last offseason.

2024 Buffalo Bills undrafted free agents
Name	Position	College	Ref.
Keaton Bills	G	Utah	
Rondell Bothroyd	DT	Oklahoma	
Gunner Britton	G	Auburn	
Jack Browning	P	San Diego State	
Te'Cory Couch	CB	Miami (FL)	
Branson Deen	DT	Miami (FL)	
Mike Edwards	OT	Campbell	
Frank Gore Jr.	RB	Southern Miss	
Xavier Johnson	WR	Ohio State	
Lawrence Keys	WR	Tulane	
Keni-H Lovely	CB	Western Michigan	
David Ugwoegbu	DE	Houston	
Joe Andreessen	LB	Buffalo	
Gable Steveson	DT	Minnesota	
Shayne Simon	LB	Pittsburgh	

== Staff ==
2024 Buffalo Bills staff
Front office: Owner/CEO/president – Terry Pegula; Owner – Kim Pegula; General manager – Brandon Beane; Assistant general manager – Brian Gaine; Director of player personnel – Terrance Gray; Senior advisor to the GM/football operations – Jim Overdorf; Senior executive – Lake Dawson; Senior personnel advisor – Malik Boyd; Co-director of pro scouting – Chris Marrow; Co-director of pro scouting – Curtis Rukavina; Assistant director of pro scouting – Asil Mulbah; Vice president of football administration – Kevin Meganck; Director of football operations – Brendan Rowe; Director of college scouting – Matt Bazirgan; Head coaches: Head coach – Sean McDermott; Offensive coaches: Offensive coordinator – Joe Brady; Quarterbacks – Ronald Curry; Running backs – Kelly Skipper; Wide receivers – Adam Henry; Tight ends – Rob Boras; Offensive line – Aaron Kromer; Offensive assistant/offensive line – Austin Gund; Offensive quality control – DJ Mangas; Offensive quality control – Kyle Shurmur; Passing game specialist/game management – Marc Lubick	Defensive coaches: Defensive coordinator – Bobby Babich; Defensive line – Marcus West; Assistant defensive line – Matt Edwards; Linebackers – Al Holcomb; Cornerbacks – Jahmile Addae; Nickel/senior defensive assistant – Scott Booker; Safeties – Joe Danna; Defensive quality control – Christian Taylor; Special teams coaches: Special teams coordinator – Matthew Smiley; Assistant special teams – Cory Harkey; Director of team administration – Matt Worswick; Strength and conditioning: Head strength and conditioning – Eric Ciano; Assistant strength and conditioning/performance development – Will Greenberg; Assistant strength and conditioning – Hal Luther; Strength and conditioning assistant – Nick Lacy; Strength and conditioning assistant – Jason Oszvart

== Final roster ==
2024 Buffalo Bills roster
Quarterbacks (QB): 17 Josh Allen; 11 Mitchell Trubisky; 14 Mike White; Running backs (RB): 4 James Cook; 22 Ray Davis; 41 Reggie Gilliam; 26 Ty Johnson; Wide receivers (WR): 0 Keon Coleman; 18 Amari Cooper; 13 Mack Hollins; 1 Curtis Samuel; 10 Khalil Shakir; Tight ends (TE): 86 Dalton Kincaid; 88 Dawson Knox; 85 Quintin Morris	Offensive linemen (OL): 70 Alec Anderson G/C; 79 Spencer Brown T; 73 Dion Dawkins T; 76 David Edwards G; 68 Tylan Grable T; 66 Connor McGovern C; 64 O'Cyrus Torrence G; 74 Ryan Van Demark T; 62 Sedrick Van Pran-Granger C; Defensive linemen (DL): 90 DeWayne Carter DT; 57 A. J. Epenesa DE; 71 Quinton Jefferson DT; 98 Austin Johnson DT; 92 DaQuan Jones DT; 40 Von Miller DE; 91 Ed Oliver DT; 97 Jordan Phillips DT; 50 Greg Rousseau DE; 94 Dawuane Smoot DE; 56 Javon Solomon DE	Linebackers (LB): 44 Joe Andreessen MLB; 43 Terrel Bernard MLB; 58 Matt Milano OLB; 48 Edefuan Ulofoshio OLB; 42 Dorian Williams OLB; Defensive backs (DB): 47 Christian Benford CB; 24 Cole Bishop FS/SS; 29 Brandon Codrington CB; 31 Rasul Douglas CB; 5 Kaiir Elam CB; 3 Damar Hamlin FS; 46 Ja'Marcus Ingram CB; 7 Taron Johnson CB; 39 Cam Lewis CB/FS; 9 Taylor Rapp SS; Special teams (ST): 2 Tyler Bass K; 69 Reid Ferguson LS; 8 Sam Martin P	Practice squad: 51 Eli Ankou DT; 77 Will Clapp C; 33 Te'Cory Couch CB; 84 Zach Davidson TE; 65 Mike Edwards G; 20 Frank Gore Jr. RB; 75 Richard Gouraige T; 19 K. J. Hamler WR; 25 Daequan Hardy CB; 23 Micah Hyde FS; 27 Kareem Jackson SS; 59 Kingsley Jonathan DE; 93 Zion Logue DT; 49 Tyreek Maddox-Williams LB; 80 Tyrell Shavers WR; 99 Casey Toohill DE; 89 Jalen Virgil WR; Reserve: 6 Shane Buechele QB (IR); -- Jake Camarda P (Futures); 67 Travis Clayton T (IR); 72 Tommy Doyle T (IR); -- Armani Rogers TE (Futures); 54 Baylon Spector OLB (IR); Rookies in italics 53 active, 6 reserve, 17 practice squad (1 exempt)

== Preseason ==
Week	Date	Opponent	Result	Record	Venue	Recap
1	August 10	Chicago Bears	L 6–33	0–1	Highmark Stadium	Recap
2	August 17	at Pittsburgh Steelers	W 9–3	1–1	Acrisure Stadium	Recap
3	August 24	Carolina Panthers	L 26–31	1–2	Highmark Stadium	Recap

== Regular season ==
=== Schedule ===
Week	Date	Opponent	Result	Record	Venue	Recap
1	September 8	Arizona Cardinals	**W** 34–28	1–0	Highmark Stadium	Recap
2	September 12	at **Miami Dolphins**	**W** 31–10	2–0	Hard Rock Stadium	Recap
3	September 23	Jacksonville Jaguars	**W** 47–10	3–0	Highmark Stadium	Recap
4	September 29	at Baltimore Ravens	**L** 10–35	3–1	M&T Bank Stadium	Recap
5	October 6	at Houston Texans	**L** 20–23	3–2	NRG Stadium	Recap
6	October 14	at **New York Jets**	**W** 23–20	4–2	MetLife Stadium	Recap
7	October 20	Tennessee Titans	**W** 34–10	5–2	Highmark Stadium	Recap
8	October 27	at Seattle Seahawks	**W** 31–10	6–2	Lumen Field	Recap
9	November 3	**Miami Dolphins**	**W** 30–27	7–2	Highmark Stadium	Recap
10	November 10	at Indianapolis Colts	**W** 30–20	8–2	Lucas Oil Stadium	Recap
11	November 17	Kansas City Chiefs	**W** 30–21	9–2	Highmark Stadium	Recap
12	Bye					
13	December 1	San Francisco 49ers	**W** 35–10	10–2	Highmark Stadium	Recap
14	December 8	at Los Angeles Rams	**L** 42–44	10–3	SoFi Stadium	Recap
15	December 15	at Detroit Lions	**W** 48–42	11–3	Ford Field	Recap
16	December 22	**New England Patriots**	**W** 24–21	12–3	Highmark Stadium	Recap
17	December 29	**New York Jets**	**W** 40–14	13–3	Highmark Stadium	Recap
18	January 5	at **New England Patriots**	**L** 16–23	13–4	Gillette Stadium	Recap

Note: Intra-division opponents are in bold text.

=== Game summaries ===
==== Week 1: vs. Arizona Cardinals ====
Week 1: Arizona Cardinals at Buffalo Bills – Game summary

Quarter	1	2	3	4	Total
Cardinals	7	10	0	11	**28**
**Bills**	0	10	14	10	**34**

at Highmark Stadium, Orchard Park, New York

- Date: September 8
- Game time: 1:00 p.m. EDT
- Game weather: Cloudy, 61 °F (16 °C)
- Game attendance: 70,542
- Referee: Tra Blake
- TV announcers (CBS): Tom McCarthy, Jay Feely, Ross Tucker and Tiffany Blackmon
- Recap, Game Book

Game information

**First quarter**

- ARI – Michael Wilson 5-yard pass from Kyler Murray (Matt Prater kick), 7:47. Cardinals 7–0. **Drive: 13 plays, 70 yards, 7:13.**

**Second quarter**

- ARI – Matt Prater 29-yard field goal, 14:57. Cardinals 10–0. **Drive: 10 plays, 60 yards, 5:27.**
- BUF – Tyler Bass 37-yard field goal, 9:47. Cardinals 10–3. **Drive: 9 plays, 51 yards, 5:10.**
- ARI – James Conner 3-yard run (Matt Prater kick), 2:40. Cardinals 17–3. **Drive: 13 plays, 71 yards, 7:07.**
- BUF – Josh Allen 7-yard run (Tyler Bass kick), 0:19. Cardinals 17–10. **Drive: 7 plays, 70 yards, 2:21.**

**Third quarter**

- BUF – Mack Hollins 11-yard pass from Josh Allen (Tyler Bass kick), 9:51. Tied 17–17. **Drive: 10 plays, 60 yards, 5:09.**
- BUF – Khalil Shakir 11-yard pass from Josh Allen (Tyler Bass kick), 2:37. Bills 24–17. **Drive: 5 plays, 21 yards, 2:48.**

**Fourth quarter**

- ARI – Matt Prater 31-yard field goal, 13:32. Bills 24–20. **Drive: 8 plays, 58 yards, 4:05.**
- BUF – Josh Allen 6-yard run (Tyler Bass kick), 8:44. Bills 31–20. **Drive: 10 plays, 70 yards, 4:48.**
- ARI – DeeJay Dallas 96-yard kickoff return (James Conner run), 8:31. Bills 31–28.
- BUF – Tyler Bass 39-yard field goal, 1:56. Bills 34–28. **Drive: 5 plays, 21 yards, 2:34.**

**Top passers**

- ARI – Kyler Murray – 21/31, 162 yards, TD
- BUF – Josh Allen – 18/23, 232 yards, 2 TD

**Top rushers**

- ARI – Kyler Murray – 5 rushes, 57 yards
- BUF – James Cook – 19 rushes, 71 yards

**Top receivers**

- ARI – Greg Dortch – 6 receptions, 47 yards
- BUF – Keon Coleman – 4 receptions, 51 yards

Trailing 17–3 at one point in the second quarter, the Bills stormed back in the second half with 21 unanswered points to take the lead. The Cardinals had one last chance to win after the Bills expanded their lead to 34–28, but quarterback Kyler Murray's last second Hail Mary pass attempt was denied by Bills cornerback Ja'Marcus Ingram, preventing a repeat of the Hail Murray from the 2020 season. Bills quarterback Josh Allen had four total touchdowns in the win, tallying his fourth career game with multiple rushing and passing touchdowns, tied for the most in league history with Steve Young. The Bills would begin their season with a 1–0 record.

==== Week 2: at Miami Dolphins ====
Week 2: Buffalo Bills at Miami Dolphins – Game summary

Quarter	1	2	3	4	Total
**Bills**	7	17	7	0	**31**
Dolphins	7	3	0	0	**10**

at Hard Rock Stadium, Miami Gardens, Florida

- Date: September 12
- Game time: 8:15 p.m. EDT
- Game weather: Partly cloudy, 86 °F (30 °C)
- Game attendance: 65,601
- Referee: Bill Vinovich
- TV announcers (WKBW/Prime Video): Al Michaels, Kirk Herbstreit and Kaylee Hartung
- Recap, Game Book

Game information

**First quarter**

- BUF – James Cook 17-yard pass from Josh Allen (Tyler Bass kick), 9:49. Bills 7–0. **Drive: 6 plays, 37 yards, 2:27.**
- MIA – De'Von Achane 5-yard pass from Tua Tagovailoa (Jason Sanders kick), 3:21. Tied 7–7. **Drive: 10 plays, 70 yards, 6:28.**

**Second quarter**

- BUF – Tyler Bass 43-yard field goal, 12:41. Bills 10–7. **Drive: 7 plays, 19 yards, 3:00.**
- BUF – James Cook 1-yard run (Tyler Bass kick), 6:25. Bills 17–7. **Drive: 8 plays, 85 yards, 4:29.**
- BUF – James Cook 49-yard run (Tyler Bass kick), 3:36. Bills 24–7. **Drive: 1 play, 49 yards, 0:09.**
- MIA – Jason Sanders 34-yard field goal, 0:04. Bills 24–10. **Drive: 13 plays, 54 yards, 3:32.**

**Third quarter**

- BUF – Ja'Marcus Ingram 31-yard interception return (Tyler Bass kick), 9:24. Bills 31–10. **Drive: 5 plays, 19 yards, 2:43.**

**Top passers**

- BUF – Josh Allen – 13/19, 139 yards, TD
- MIA – Tua Tagovailoa – 17/25, 145 yards, TD, 3 INT

**Top rushers**

- BUF – James Cook – 11 rushes, 78 yards, 2 TD
- MIA – De'Von Achane – 22 rushes, 96 yards

**Top receivers**

- BUF – Khalil Shakir – 5 receptions, 54 yards
- MIA – De'Von Achane – 7 receptions, 69 yards, TD

The Bills cruised to a 31–10 win over the rival Dolphins, thanks to three total touchdowns by running back James Cook and the defense intercepting Miami quarterback Tua Tagovailoa three times. However, the win was overshadowed by Tagovailoa suffering a concussion after running into contact with safety Damar Hamlin. This was Tagovailoa's third officially reported concussion in two years. With this win, the Bills improved to 2–0.

==== Week 3: vs. Jacksonville Jaguars ====
Week 3: Jacksonville Jaguars at Buffalo Bills – Game summary

Quarter	1	2	3	4	Total
Jaguars	0	3	7	0	**10**
**Bills**	13	21	3	10	**47**

at Highmark Stadium, Orchard Park, New York

- Date: September 23
- Game time: 7:30 p.m. EDT
- Game weather: Cloudy, 68 °F (20 °C)
- Game attendance: 70,316
- Referee: Shawn Smith
- TV announcers (WIVB/ESPN): Chris Fowler, Louis Riddick, Dan Orlovsky and Laura Rutledge
- Recap, Game Book

Game information

**First quarter**

- BUF – James Cook 6-yard run (kick blocked), 9:34. Bills 6–0. **Drive: 10 plays, 70 yards, 5:26.**
- BUF – Dalton Kincaid 6-yard pass from Josh Allen (Tyler Bass kick), 3:25. Bills 13–0. **Drive: 11 plays, 65 yards, 5:12.**

**Second quarter**

- JAX – Cam Little 41-yard field goal, 10:39. Bills 13–3. **Drive: 14 plays, 47 yards, 7:46.**
- BUF – Keon Coleman 24-yard pass from Josh Allen (Tyler Bass kick), 6:19. Bills 20–3. **Drive: 8 plays, 68 yards, 4:20.**
- BUF – Khalil Shakir 27-yard pass from Josh Allen (Tyler Bass kick), 2:04. Bills 27–3. **Drive: 5 plays, 41 yards, 2:09.**
- BUF – Ty Johnson 16-yard pass from Josh Allen (Tyler Bass kick), 0:19. Bills 34–3. **Drive: 5 plays, 64 yards, 0:53.**

**Third quarter**

- JAX – Brenton Strange 6-yard pass from Trevor Lawrence (Cam Little kick), 11:15. Bills 34–10. **Drive: 8 plays, 70 yards, 3:45.**
- BUF – Tyler Bass 27-yard field goal, 5:03. Bills 37–10. **Drive: 11 plays, 61 yards, 6:12.**

**Fourth quarter**

- BUF – Tyler Bass 43-yard field goal, 7:45. Bills 40–10. **Drive: 4 plays, 7 yards, 2:13.**
- BUF – Ray Davis 3-yard run (Tyler Bass kick), Bills 47–10. **Drive: 4 plays, 21 yards, 2:17.**

**Top passers**

- JAX – Trevor Lawrence – 21/38, 178 yards, TD, INT
- BUF – Josh Allen – 23/30, 263 yards, 4 TD

**Top rushers**

- JAX – Travis Etienne – 11 rushes, 68 yards
- BUF – Josh Allen – 6 rushes, 44 yards

**Top receivers**

- JAX – Christian Kirk – 8 receptions, 79 yards
- BUF – Khalil Shakir – 6 receptions, 72 yards

The Bills turned in a strong performance against the Jaguars in Week 3 on Monday Night Football. Buffalo's defensive line only allowed Jacksonville a field goal and a touchdown in the game, with Bills safety Damar Hamlin picking off Jaguar quarterback Trevor Lawrence for his first interception. Rookies Keon Coleman and Ray Davis scored their first career NFL touchdowns, with Coleman catching a 24-yard pass from Josh Allen and Davis running for a 3-yard touchdown. Davis' fellow halfbacks James Cook and Ty Johnson also scored touchdowns as the Bills improved their record to 3–0.

==== Week 4: at Baltimore Ravens ====
Week 4: Buffalo Bills at Baltimore Ravens – Game summary

Quarter	1	2	3	4	Total
Bills	3	0	7	0	**10**
**Ravens**	7	14	7	7	**35**

at M&T Bank Stadium, Baltimore, Maryland

- Date: September 29
- Game time: 8:20 p.m. EDT
- Game weather: Cloudy, 68 °F (20 °C)
- Game attendance: 70,636
- Referee: Alan Eck
- TV announcers (NBC): Mike Tirico, Cris Collinsworth and Melissa Stark
- Recap, Game Book

Game information

**First quarter**

- BAL – Derrick Henry 87-yard run (Justin Tucker kick), 10:50. Ravens 7–0. **Drive: 1 play, 87 yards, 0:12.**
- BUF – Tyler Bass 50-yard field goal, 4:34. Ravens 7–3. **Drive: 11 plays, 38 yards, 6:16.**

**Second quarter**

- BAL – Derrick Henry 5-yard pass from Lamar Jackson (Justin Tucker kick), 14:55. Ravens 14–3. **Drive: 9 plays, 70 yards, 4:39.**
- BAL – Justice Hill 19-yard pass from Lamar Jackson (Justin Tucker kick), 7:34. Ravens 21–3. **Drive: 10 plays, 81 yards, 5:16.**

**Third quarter**

- BUF – Ty Johnson 3-yard run (Tyler Bass kick), 11:26. Ravens 21–10. **Drive: 4 plays, 60 yards, 2:27.**
- BAL – Lamar Jackson 9-yard run (Justin Tucker kick), 2:45. Ravens 28–10. **Drive: 6 plays, 59 yards, 3:35.**

**Fourth quarter**

- BAL – Patrick Ricard fumble recovery in the end zone (Justin Tucker kick), 11:23. Ravens 35–10. **Drive: 6 plays, 62 yards, 3:32.**

**Top passers**

- BUF – Josh Allen – 16/29, 180 yards
- BAL – Lamar Jackson – 13/18, 156 yards, 2 TD

**Top rushers**

- BUF – James Cook – 9 rushes, 39 yards
- BAL – Derrick Henry – 24 rushes, 199 yards, TD

**Top receivers**

- BUF – Khalil Shakir – 4 receptions, 62 yards
- BAL – Justice Hill – 6 receptions, 78 yards, TD

After three consecutive wins to open the season, the Bills took a sour loss from the Ravens on Sunday Night Football. With the defense missing several key players due to ongoing injuries, they were unable to contain Baltimore running back Derrick Henry as he rushed for 199 yards. The offense was outgained 236 to 427 culminating in the Bills' first loss of the 2024 season as they fell to 3–1.

==== Week 5: at Houston Texans ====
Week 5: Buffalo Bills at Houston Texans – Game summary

Quarter	1	2	3	4	Total
Bills	3	0	14	3	**20**
**Texans**	14	3	3	3	**23**

at NRG Stadium, Houston, Texas

- Date: October 6
- Game time: 1:00 p.m. EDT/12:00 p.m. CDT
- Game weather: None (retractable roof closed)
- Game attendance: 71,427
- Referee: Clay Martin
- TV announcers (CBS): Ian Eagle, Charles Davis and Evan Washburn
- Recap, Game Book

Game information

**First quarter**

- BUF – Tyler Bass 38-yard field goal, 6:27. Bills 3–0. **Drive: 10 plays, 29 yards, 5:37.**
- HOU – Cam Akers 15-yard run (Kaʻimi Fairbairn kick), 2:55. Texans 7–3. **Drive: 6 plays, 70 yards, 3:32.**
- HOU – Nico Collins 67-yard pass from C. J. Stroud (Kaʻimi Fairbairn kick), 1:34. Texans 14–3. **Drive: 1 play, 67 yards, 0:09.**

**Second quarter**

- HOU – Kaʻimi Fairbairn 50-yard field goal, 0:00. Texans 17–3. **Drive: 6 plays, 19 yards, 0:30.**

**Third quarter**

- HOU – Kaʻimi Fairbairn 47-yard field goal, 11:15. Texans 20–3. **Drive: 8 plays, 41 yards, 3:45.**
- BUF – James Cook 5-yard run (Tyler Bass kick), 8:48. Texans 20–10. **Drive: 6 plays, 70 yards, 2:27.**
- BUF – Keon Coleman 49-yard pass from Josh Allen (Tyler Bass kick), 4:20. Texans 20–17. **Drive: 5 plays, 65 yards, 2:46.**

**Fourth quarter**

- BUF – Tyler Bass 33-yard field goal, 3:30. Tied 20–20. **Drive: 4 plays, 0 yards, 1:03.**
- HOU – Kaʻimi Fairbairn 59-yard field goal, 0:00. Texans 23–20. **Drive: 2 plays, 5 yards, 0:07.**

**Top passers**

- BUF – Josh Allen – 9/30, 131 yards, TD
- HOU – C. J. Stroud – 28/38, 331 yards, TD, INT

**Top rushers**

- BUF – James Cook – 20 rushes, 82 yards, TD
- HOU – Cam Akers – 9 rushes, 42 yards, TD

**Top receivers**

- BUF – Keon Coleman – 1 reception, 49 yards, TD
- HOU – Stefon Diggs – 6 receptions, 82 yards

The Bills faced off against former receiver Stefon Diggs for the first time since they traded him to the Texans in the offseason. The game started off with a 38-yard Tyler Bass field goal, only for Texans running back Cam Akers to rush for a 15-yard touchdown and Houston quarterback C. J. Stroud to throw a 67-yard pass touchdown pass to wide receiver Nico Collins. The Bills would ultimately turn around in the second half with touchdowns from James Cook and Keon Coleman, and another Tyler Bass field goal put the Bills in a tied situation against the Texans. However, in what was seen as a major gaffe, the Bills opted to pass three consecutive times from their own end zone with just seconds left in regulation, resulting in three incompletions from Josh Allen, who finished with a career-worst 30% completion percentage. Buffalo punted with 16 seconds left in the game and Houston retaining all three of its timeouts. After a quick gain to get into field goal range and a timeout taken by Houston, Kaʻimi Fairbairn kicked a 59-yard field goal just as time expired, denying Buffalo’s attempt to come back. With the loss, Buffalo dropped back-to-back games and fell to 3–2 on the season.

Head coach Sean McDermott took the blame for deciding to pass in the waning moments of the game instead of running, which would have forced the Texans to burn their timeouts and likely taken the game to overtime, and the team's training staff was criticized for allowing Allen back into the game after he suffered what appeared to be a concussion at first glance, though a later review found no violation of the NFL's concussion protocol.

==== Week 6: at New York Jets ====
Week 6: Buffalo Bills at New York Jets – Game summary

Quarter	1	2	3	4	Total
**Bills**	7	13	0	3	**23**
Jets	10	7	3	0	**20**

at MetLife Stadium, East Rutherford, New Jersey

- Date: October 14
- Game time: 8:15 p.m. EDT
- Game weather: Clear, 49 °F (9 °C)
- Game attendance: 81,118
- Referee: Adrian Hill
- TV announcers (ESPN/ABC): Joe Buck, Troy Aikman and Laura Rutledge
- Recap, Game Book

Game information

**First quarter**

- NYJ – Greg Zuerlein 34-yard field goal, 11:06. Jets 3–0. **Drive: 8 plays, 54 yards, 3:54.**
- BUF – Josh Allen 1-yard run (Tyler Bass kick), 6:12. Bills 7–3. **Drive: 9 plays, 70 yards, 4:54.**
- NYJ – Garrett Wilson 5-yard pass from Aaron Rodgers (Greg Zuerlein kick), 2:06. Jets 10–7. **Drive: 9 plays, 70 yards, 4:11.**

**Second quarter**

- BUF – Mack Hollins 8-yard pass from Josh Allen (kick failed, wide left), 6:54. Bills 13–10. **Drive: 10 plays, 90 yards, 5:12.**
- BUF – Dawson Knox 12-yard pass from Josh Allen (Tyler Bass kick), 0:21. Bills 20–10. **Drive: 10 plays, 80 yards, 2:28.**
- NYJ – Allen Lazard 52-yard pass from Aaron Rodgers (Greg Zuerlein kick), 0:00. Bills 20–17. **Drive: 3 plays, 70 yards, 0:21.**

**Third quarter**

- NYJ – Greg Zuerlein 22-yard field goal, 6:13. Tied 20–20. **Drive: 10 plays, 60 yards, 4:53.**

**Fourth quarter**

- BUF – Tyler Bass 22-yard field goal, 3:43. Bills 23–20. **Drive: 11 plays, 64 yards, 6:01.**

**Top passers**

- BUF – Josh Allen – 19/25, 215 yards, 2 TD
- NYJ – Aaron Rodgers – 23/35, 294 yards, 2 TD, INT

**Top rushers**

- BUF – Ray Davis – 20 rushes, 97 yards
- NYJ – Breece Hall – 18 rushes, 113 yards

**Top receivers**

- BUF – Ray Davis – 3 receptions, 55 yards
- NYJ – Allen Lazard – 6 receptions, 114 yards, TD

After suffering back-to-back losses, the Bills started this Monday Night Football game against the division rival Jets with a strong rushing attack, despite missing starting tailback James Cook due to a toe injury, and Josh Allen scoring three touchdowns in the first half, namely a one-yard rushing touchdown and scoring passes to Mack Hollins and Dawson Knox. The defense struggled to contain Aaron Rodgers and Breece Hall at times, despite the returns of cornerback Taron Johnson and safety Taylor Rapp, culminating in the Jets keeping the score close, with Rodgers throwing a 52-yard Hail Mary pass to Allen Lazard as time expired in the first half. During a low-scoring second half, Bills kicker Tyler Bass kicked a go-ahead field goal with just three minutes to go, and Rodgers was intercepted by Johnson on the ensuing drive, sealing Buffalo’s fourth win in the 2024 season.

Ray Davis filled in admirably for Cook, rushing for 97 yards overall. Khalil Shakir also returned to play in limited snaps after missing the week prior due to an injury he suffered in the Ravens game two weeks prior. Both Bass and Jets kicker Greg Zuerlein struggled in the game, missing two kicks apiece, and the two teams combined for 22 accepted penalty flags for 204 yards in a sloppy, tension-filled game. The Bills improved to 4–2, with their first win in three weeks.

==== Week 7: vs. Tennessee Titans ====
Week 7: Tennessee Titans at Buffalo Bills – Game summary

Quarter	1	2	3	4	Total
Titans	3	7	0	0	**10**
**Bills**	0	7	10	17	**34**

at Highmark Stadium, Orchard Park, New York

- Date: October 20
- Game time: 1:00 p.m. EDT
- Game weather: Sunny, 66 °F (19 °C)
- Game attendance: 70,842
- Referee: John Hussey
- TV announcers (CBS): Andrew Catalon, Tiki Barber, Jason McCourty and A.J. Ross
- Recap, Game Book

Game information

**First quarter**

- TEN – Nick Folk 25-yard field goal, 2:57. Titans 3–0. **Drive: 13 plays, 61 yards, 7:03.**

**Second quarter**

- TEN – Nick Westbrook-Ikhine 4-yard pass from Mason Rudolph (Nick Folk kick), 11:31. Titans 10–0. **Drive: 8 plays, 75 yards, 4:45.**
- BUF – James Cook 11-yard run (Tyler Bass kick), 10:04. Titans 10–7. **Drive: 3 plays, 61 yards, 1:27.**

**Third quarter**

- BUF – Amari Cooper 12-yard pass from Josh Allen (Tyler Bass kick), 10:23. Bills 14–10. **Drive: 6 plays, 41 yards, 2:32.**
- BUF – Tyler Bass 28-yard field goal, 4:12. Bills 17–10. **Drive: 9 plays, 64 yards, 3:53.**

**Fourth quarter**

- BUF – Ty Johnson 4-yard pass from Josh Allen (Tyler Bass kick), 14:54. Bills 24–10. **Drive: 6 plays, 56 yards, 2:55.**
- BUF – Tyler Bass 30-yard field goal, 9:26. Bills 27–10. **Drive: 10 plays, 59 yards, 4:59.**
- BUF – Ray Davis 16-yard run (Tyler Bass kick), 1:53. Bills 34–10. **Drive: 5 plays, 84 yards, 2:44.**

**Top passers**

- TEN – Mason Rudolph – 25/40, 215 yards, TD, INT
- BUF – Josh Allen – 21/33, 323 yards, 2 TD

**Top rushers**

- TEN – Tony Pollard – 16 rushes, 61 yards
- BUF – Ray Davis – 5 rushes, 41 yards, TD

**Top receivers**

- TEN – Chig Okonkwo – 4 receptions, 50 yards
- BUF – Keon Coleman – 4 receptions, 125 yards

Despite Tennessee leading 10–0 at one point in the second quarter, Buffalo ultimately took control in the second half, overcoming consecutive three-and-out possessions in the first half to score 34 unanswered points. All three of Buffalo's active halfbacks, namely James Cook, Ty Johnson, and Ray Davis, scored touchdowns, in addition to newly-acquired receiver Amari Cooper. With the win, Buffalo improved to 5–2 in Josh Allen's 100th career game.

==== Week 8: at Seattle Seahawks ====
Week 8: Buffalo Bills at Seattle Seahawks – Game summary

Quarter	1	2	3	4	Total
**Bills**	7	7	10	7	**31**
Seahawks	0	3	0	7	**10**

at Lumen Field, Seattle, Washington

- Date: October 27
- Game time: 4:05 p.m. EDT/1:05 p.m. PDT
- Game weather: Mostly cloudy, 55 °F (13 °C)
- Game attendance: 68,704
- Referee: Ronald Torbert
- TV announcers (Fox): Kevin Burkhardt, Tom Brady, Erin Andrews and Tom Rinaldi
- Recap, Game Book

Game information

**First quarter**

- BUF – Keon Coleman 2-yard pass from Josh Allen (Tyler Bass kick), 4:51. Bills 7–0. **Drive: 14 plays, 90 yards, 9:07.**

**Second quarter**

- SEA – Jason Myers 38-yard field goal, 8:14. Bills 7–3. **Drive: 13 plays, 71 yards, 7:04.**
- BUF – Dalton Kincaid 12-yard pass from Josh Allen (Tyler Bass kick), 0:18. Bills 14–3. 'Drive: 12 plays, 93 yards, 4:26

**Third quarter**

- BUF – Tyler Bass 27-yard field goal, 8:31. Bills 17–3. **Drive: 11 plays, 69 yards, 6:29.**
- BUF – James Cook 2-yard run (Tyler Bass kick), 1:57. Bills 24–3. **Drive: 7 plays, 51 yards, 4:02.**

**Fourth quarter**

- BUF – James Cook 7-yard run (Tyler Bass kick), 11:19. Bills 31–3. **Drive: 7 plays, 73 yards, 3:44.**
- SEA – Zach Charbonnet 1-yard run (Jason Myers kick), 8:02. Bills 31–10. **Drive: 9 plays, 70 yards, 3:17.**

**Top passers**

- BUF – Josh Allen – 24/34, 283 yards, 2 TD, INT
- SEA – Geno Smith – 21/29, 212 yards, INT

**Top rushers**

- BUF – James Cook – 17 rushes, 111 yards, 2 TD
- SEA – Geno Smith – 5 rushes, 16 yards

**Top receivers**

- BUF – Khalil Shakir – 9 receptions, 107 yards
- SEA – Jaxon Smith-Njigba – 6 receptions, 69 yards

Buffalo's dominance continued once more against Seattle, with the Seahawks' defense unable to contain the Bills' offense, resulting in the Bills gaining 31 unanswered points. Buffalo got touchdowns from Keon Coleman and Dalton Kincaid, while James Cook rushed for two touchdowns and Tyler Bass successfully made a 27-yard field goal. Buffalo's defensive line only allowed Seattle a field goal and a touchdown. However, Josh Allen's streak of no interceptions in 2024 ended when Seahawks cornerback Josh Jobe picked him off. Despite that interception, the Bills improved to 6–2.

==== Week 9: vs. Miami Dolphins ====
Week 9: Miami Dolphins at Buffalo Bills – Game summary

Quarter	1	2	3	4	Total
Dolphins	3	7	3	14	**27**
**Bills**	3	3	14	10	**30**

at Highmark Stadium, Orchard Park, New York

- Date: November 3
- Game time: 1:00 p.m. EST
- Game weather: Sunny, 54 °F (12 °C)
- Game attendance: 70,862
- Referee: Tra Blake
- TV announcers (CBS): Kevin Harlan, Trent Green and Melanie Collins
- Recap, Game Book

Game information

**First quarter**

- BUF – Tyler Bass 40-yard field goal, 6:30. Bills 3–0. **Drive: 7 plays, 15 yards, 3:57.**
- MIA – Jason Sanders 39-yard field goal, 1:19. Tied 3–3. **Drive: 9 plays, 49 yards, 5:11.**

**Second quarter**

- MIA – De'Von Achane 14-yard pass from Tua Tagovailoa (Jason Sanders kick), 3:20. Dolphins 10–3. **Drive: 14 plays, 97 yards, 8:21.**
- BUF – Tyler Bass 49-yard field goal, 0:07. Dolphins 10–6. **Drive: 12 plays, 39 yards, 3:13.**

**Third quarter**

- BUF – Mack Hollins 1-yard pass from Josh Allen (kick failed, wide left), 7:20. Bills 12–10. **Drive: 11 plays, 64 yards, 6:23.**
- MIA – Jason Sanders 23-yard field goal, 2:59. Dolphins 13–12. **Drive: 9 plays, 65 yards, 4:21.**
- BUF – Ray Davis 63-yard pass from Josh Allen (Josh Allen–Keon Coleman pass), 2:07. Bills 20–13. **Drive: 2 plays, 70 yards, 0:52.**

**Fourth quarter**

- MIA – De'Von Achane 8-yard run (Jason Sanders kick), 12:14. Tied 20–20. **Drive: 9 plays, 70 yards, 4:53.**
- BUF – Quintin Morris 2-yard pass from Josh Allen (Tyler Bass kick), 6:18. Bills 27–20. **Drive: 10 plays, 70 yards, 5:56.**
- MIA – Jaylen Waddle 7-yard pass from Tua Tagovailoa (Jason Sanders kick), 1:38. Tied 27–27. **Drive: 11 plays, 81 yards, 4:40.**
- BUF – Tyler Bass 61-yard field goal, 0:05. Bills 30–27. **Drive: 9 plays, 27 yards, 1:33.**

**Top passers**

- MIA – Tua Tagovailoa – 25/28, 231 yards, 2 TD
- BUF – Josh Allen – 25/39, 235 yards, 3 TD, INT

**Top rushers**

- MIA – De'Von Achane – 12 rushes, 63 yards, TD
- BUF – James Cook – 10 rushes, 44 yards

**Top receivers**

- MIA – Tyreek Hill – 4 receptions, 80 yards
- BUF – Ray Davis – 2 receptions, 70 yards, TD

The Bills opened the scoring in their second regular-season meeting with the Dolphins, with Tyler Bass making a 40-yard field goal. The Buffalo defense allowed Miami to put points on the board in two consecutive drives. The Dolphins took advantage of Josh Allen's second interception of the season, where a pass intended for Keon Coleman bounced off of the receiver's hands and was picked off by Miami cornerback Jalen Ramsey on the 3-yard line. Miami drove 97 yards to score their first touchdown of the game, putting them ahead 10–3. The Bills were forced to settle for a 49-yard field goal from Bass to end the first half after two consecutive plays ending in touchdowns were negated by holding penalties. The Dolphins received the kickoff to start the second half, but their first drive ended in a forced fumble by Taron Johnson, with Kaiir Elam recovering the ball for the Bills. Miami and Buffalo traded scores through the third and fourth quarter, leading to a 27–27 score in the final moments. The Bills got into field goal range on their final drive of the game with the help of a personal foul penalty called on Miami safety (and former Bill) Jordan Poyer after he hit Coleman in the head. The penalty set the Bills up for a game-winning, 61-yard field goal by Bass, setting a new record for the longest field goal in Bills history. The Dolphins were unable to score in the time remaining, improving Buffalo's record to 7–2. This was the Bills' fourth consecutive victory and their fifth consecutive regular-season victory against Miami.

==== Week 10: at Indianapolis Colts ====
Week 10: Buffalo Bills at Indianapolis Colts – Game summary

Quarter	1	2	3	4	Total
**Bills**	10	10	0	10	**30**
Colts	3	10	0	7	**20**

at Lucas Oil Stadium, Indianapolis, Indiana

- Date: November 10
- Game time: 1:00 p.m. EST
- Game weather: Partly sunny, 63 °F (17 °C) (retractable roof open)
- Game attendance: 66,474
- Referee: Scott Novak
- TV announcers (CBS): Andrew Catalon, Tiki Barber, Jason McCourty and A.J. Ross
- Recap, Game Book

Game information

**First quarter**

- BUF – Taron Johnson 23-yard interception return (Tyler Bass kick), 12:14. Bills 7–0. **Drive: 1 play, 0 yards, 0:10.**
- BUF – Tyler Bass 29-yard field goal, 5:33. Bills 10–0. **Drive: 9 plays, 42 yards, 3:33.**
- IND – Matt Gay 27-yard field goal, 3:31. Bills 10–3. **Drive: 6 plays, 61 yards, 2:02.**

**Second quarter**

- IND – Tyler Goodson 2-yard pass from Joe Flacco (Matt Gay kick), 9:22. Tied 10–10. **Drive: 11 plays, 72 yards, 5:46.**
- IND – Matt Gay 23-yard field goal, 6:32. Colts 13–10. **Drive: 5 plays, 28 yards, 2:40.**
- BUF – Josh Allen 13-yard run (Tyler Bass kick), 2:14. Bills 17–13. **Drive: 8 plays, 70 yards, 4:18.**
- BUF – Tyler Bass 47-yard field goal, 0:00. Bills 20–13. **Drive: 8 plays, 60 yards, 1:10.**

**Third quarter**

- No scoring plays.

**Fourth quarter**

- BUF – Tyler Bass 28-yard field goal, 10:58. Bills 23–13. **Drive: 13 plays, 60 yards, 6:47.**
- BUF – James Cook 2-yard run (Tyler Bass kick), 3:04. Bills 30–13. **Drive: 13 plays, 84 yards, 6:42.**
- IND – Alec Pierce 10-yard pass from Joe Flacco (Matt Gay kick), 0:02. Bills 30–20. **Drive: 10 plays, 70 yards, 3:02.**

**Top passers**

- BUF – Josh Allen – 22/37, 280 yards, 2 INT
- IND – Joe Flacco – 26/35, 272 yards, 2 TD, 3 INT

**Top rushers**

- BUF – James Cook – 19 rushes, 80 yards, TD
- IND – Jonathan Taylor – 21 rushes, 114 yards

**Top receivers**

- BUF – Mack Hollins – 4 receptions, 86 yards
- IND – Alec Pierce – 4 receptions, 81 yards, TD

The Bills started this matchup against the Colts with a pick six by Taron Johnson, who intercepted a pass from Indianapolis backup quarterback Joe Flacco, and a 29-yard Tyler Bass field goal. Both teams put up a strong performance against each other, although Josh Allen threw his third and fourth interceptions of 2024 to Colts linebacker E. J. Speed and cornerback Kenny Moore II. The Bills' defense at times struggled to contain the Colts' offense, with Matt Gay kicking two field goals and Flacco throwing a touchdown pass to Tyler Goodson to put the Colts ahead by three points in the second quarter. However, a 13-yard touchdown run by Allen and a 47-yard field goal from Bass put the Bills ahead again by seven points. Buffalo put the game out of reach in the final quarter, as James Cook ran for a two-yard touchdown and Bass kicked his third field goal of the game, this time for 28 yards. The Bills improved to 8–2 on the season and secured their first win in Indianapolis since 1998.

With his 13-yard touchdown, Allen became tied for second in Bills franchise history for rushing touchdowns at 57. Furthermore, the Bills had no passing touchdowns in the game. Also this was first time when the Bills won five consecutive games in a 8–2 record since 1993.

==== Week 11: vs. Kansas City Chiefs ====
Week 11: Kansas City Chiefs at Buffalo Bills – Game summary

Quarter	1	2	3	4	Total
Chiefs	0	14	0	7	**21**
**Bills**	6	10	0	14	**30**

at Highmark Stadium, Orchard Park, New York

- Date: November 17
- Game time: 4:25 p.m. EST
- Game weather: Cloudy, 50 °F (10 °C)
- Game attendance: 71,112
- Referee: Land Clark
- TV announcers (CBS): Jim Nantz, Tony Romo and Tracy Wolfson
- Recap, Game Book

Game information

**First quarter**

- BUF – James Cook 3-yard run (kick failed, wide right), 10:00. Bills 6–0. **Drive: 8 plays, 65 yards, 4:15.**

**Second quarter**

- KC – Xavier Worthy 10-yard pass from Patrick Mahomes (Spencer Shrader kick), 14:53. Chiefs 7–6. **Drive: 11 plays, 88 yards, 5:27.**
- BUF – James Cook 6-yard run (Tyler Bass kick), 10:06. Bills 13–7. **Drive: 9 plays, 70 yards, 4:45.**
- KC – Noah Gray 2-yard pass from Patrick Mahomes (Spencer Shrader kick), 2:51. Chiefs 14–13. **Drive: 9 plays, 40 yards, 4:34.**
- BUF – Tyler Bass 33-yard field goal, 0:00. Bills 16–14. **Drive: 12 plays, 62 yards, 2:51.**

**Third quarter**

- No scoring plays.

**Fourth quarter**

- BUF – Curtis Samuel 12-yard pass from Josh Allen (Tyler Bass kick), 12:51. Bills 23–14. **Drive: 10 plays, 83 yards, 6:03.**
- KC – Noah Gray 1-yard pass from Patrick Mahomes (Spencer Shrader kick), 7:53. Bills 23–21. **Drive: 10 plays, 70 yards, 4:58.**
- BUF – Josh Allen 26-yard run (Tyler Bass kick), 2:17. Bills 30–21. **Drive: 12 plays, 70 yards, 5:36.**

**Top passers**

- KC – Patrick Mahomes – 23/33, 196 yards, 3 TD, 2 INT
- BUF – Josh Allen – 27/40, 262 yards, TD, INT

**Top rushers**

- KC – Kareem Hunt – 14 rushes, 60 yards
- BUF – Josh Allen – 12 rushes, 55 yards, TD

**Top receivers**

- KC – Xavier Worthy – 4 receptions, 61 yards, TD
- BUF – Khalil Shakir – 8 receptions, 70 yards

The Buffalo Bills hosted the Kansas City Chiefs for their fifth consecutive regular season matchup. The Chiefs received the ball to start, but the Bills defense forced a turnover on the second play of the game. Taylor Rapp picked off a pass thrown by Patrick Mahomes as he was being tackled by DaQuan Jones, and the Bills capitalized on the takeaway with an 8-play, 65-yard drive to go up 6–0. There were four lead changes during the second quarter of the tame, beginning with the Chiefs driving 88 yards for a touchdown to make it 7–6 and the Bills answering with a 70-yard touchdown drive to go up 13–7. The Chiefs took advantage of a miscue to make it 14–13 after picking off Josh Allen, and the Bills ended the first half with a 33-yard field goal to bring the score to 16–14.

After trading punts on the first four plays of the second half, the Bills held onto the ball for 6:03 on their longest touchdown drive of the game, putting them two scores ahead of the Chiefs at 23–14. The Chiefs responded with a touchdown, bringing the game within 2 points. Facing 4th & 2 on the Chiefs' 26 yard line, Josh Allen took control of the game and brought his team to 30–21 with a 26-yard rushing touchdown. The Chiefs attempted to bring the game within one score, but with 1:17 left to play, Terrel Bernard intercepted a pass intended for Travis Kelce and clinched the game for Buffalo. The Bills ended the Chiefs' undefeated season and their 15-game win streak, and the Bills became the first team to score 28 or more points against Kansas City since the 2022 season. Josh Allen's rushing touchdown put him in 2nd place for most rushing touchdowns in Bills history, with 58. He also tied Hall of Fame quarterback Jim Kelly for the most total touchdowns, at 244. With their fourth consecutive win against Kansas City, and first home win against the Chiefs since 2012, the Bills entered their bye week at 9–2. It was the first time this particular matchup had been decided by more than one score since Week 5 of the 2021 season. The win also dashed the Chiefs' hopes of going undefeated, and prevented the Chiefs from being the first NFL team to start a season 10–0 since the 2020 Pittsburgh Steelers.

The game was watched by 31.2 million viewers, becoming the highest-rated football game of the 2024 NFL season. It was the highest-rated regular season and non-holiday game since the Week 9 matchup of the New England Patriots and Indianapolis Colts during the 2007 NFL season.

==== Week 13: vs. San Francisco 49ers ====
Week 13: San Francisco 49ers at Buffalo Bills – Game summary

Quarter	1	2	3	4	Total
49ers	3	0	7	0	**10**
**Bills**	7	14	7	7	**35**

at Highmark Stadium, Orchard Park, New York

- Date: December 1
- Game time: 8:20 p.m. EST
- Game weather: Snow, 28 °F (−2 °C)
- Game attendance: 70,437
- Referee: Alex Kemp
- TV announcers (NBC): Mike Tirico, Cris Collinsworth and Melissa Stark
- Recap, Game Book

Game information

**First quarter**

- SF – Jake Moody 33-yard field goal, 7:41. 49ers 3–0. **Drive: 9 plays, 48 yards, 4:40.**
- BUF – Ray Davis 5-yard run (Tyler Bass kick), 0:03. Bills 7–3. **Drive: 13 plays, 70 yards, 7:38.**

**Second quarter**

- BUF – James Cook 65-yard run (Tyler Bass kick), 8:38. Bills 14–3. **Drive: 1 play, 65 yards, 0:10.**
- BUF – Mack Hollins 7-yard pass from Josh Allen (Tyler Bass kick), 0:41. Bills 21–3. **Drive: 9 plays, 97 yards, 2:50.**

**Third quarter**

- BUF – Josh Allen 7-yard pass play by Josh Allen (Tyler Bass kick), 5:58. Bills 28–3. **Drive: 6 plays, 44 yards, 3:05.**
- SF – Isaac Guerendo 15-yard run (Jake Moody kick), 2:54. Bills 28–10. **Drive: 6 plays, 48 yards, 3:04.**

**Fourth quarter**

- BUF – Josh Allen 8-yard run (Tyler Bass kick), 12:31. Bills 35–10. **Drive: 4 plays, 25 yards, 2:22.**

**Top passers**

- SF – Brock Purdy – 11/18, 94 yards
- BUF – Josh Allen – 13/17, 148 yards, 2 TD

**Top rushers**

- SF – Jordan Mason – 13 rushes, 78 yards
- BUF – James Cook – 14 rushes, 107 yards, TD

**Top receivers**

- SF – Jauan Jennings – 3 receptions, 56 yards
- BUF – Dawson Knox – 2 receptions, 56 yards

The Bills' Sunday Night Football matchup against the 49ers saw Buffalo cruise to their 7th consecutive victory and 10th overall victory in 2024. They did so in a dominant fashion, with the Bills Defense Line only allowing San Francisco a field goal and a touchdown. Meanwhile, the Bills offense gained 35 points with 28 of them unanswered. These points included rushing touchdowns from Ray Davis, James Cook, and Josh Allen, while Allen and Mack Hollis scored passing touchdowns. Allen also became the first quarterback in NFL history to score passing, receiving, and rushing touchdowns all in the same game. This game would improve the Bills to 10–2 and win their fifth consecutive AFC East title. It is the fastest an NFL team has clinched their division since the 2009 Indianapolis Colts, a complete opposite scenario compared to the Bills 2023 season where they clinched their division in the last regular season game. This marks the team's best start to a season since 1991.

==== Week 14: at Los Angeles Rams ====
Week 14: Buffalo Bills at Los Angeles Rams – Game summary

Quarter	1	2	3	4	Total
Bills	7	7	7	21	**42**
**Rams**	7	17	14	6	**44**

at SoFi Stadium, Inglewood, California

- Date: December 8
- Game time: 4:25 p.m. EST/1:25 p.m. PST
- Game weather: Sunny, 68 °F (20 °C) (fixed roof)
- Game attendance: 73,493
- Referee: Craig Wrolstad
- TV announcers (Fox): Kevin Burkhardt, Tom Brady, Erin Andrews and Tom Rinaldi
- Recap, Game Book

Game information

**First quarter**

- LAR – Kyren Williams 3-yard run (Joshua Karty kick), 8:26. Rams 7–0. **Drive: 12 plays, 70 yards, 6:34.**
- BUF – Josh Allen 1-yard run (Tyler Bass kick), 3:22. Tied 7–7. **Drive: 9 plays, 70 yards, 5:04.**

**Second quarter**

- LAR – Joshua Karty 22-yard field goal, 13:37. Rams 10–7. **Drive: 10 plays, 65 yards, 4:45.**
- LAR – Hunter Long 22-yard return of blocked punt (Joshua Karty kick), 12:29. Rams 17–7.
- BUF – Ty Johnson 41-yard pass from Josh Allen (Tyler Bass kick), 10:23. Rams 17–14. **Drive: 4 plays, 70 yards, 2:06.**
- LAR – Puka Nacua 4-yard run (Joshua Karty kick), 2:36. Rams 24–14. **Drive: 12 plays, 76 yards, 7:47.**

**Third quarter**

- LAR – Kyren Williams 7-yard run (Joshua Karty kick), 8:26. Rams 31–14. **Drive: 11 plays, 76 yards, 5:29.**
- BUF – Khalil Shakir 51-yard pass from Josh Allen (Tyler Bass kick), 3:54. Rams 31–21. **Drive: 6 plays, 80 yards, 4:32.**
- LAR – Cooper Kupp 17-yard pass from Matthew Stafford (Joshua Karty kick), 0:18. Rams 38–21. **Drive: 7 plays, 70 yards, 3:36.**

**Fourth quarter**

- BUF – Josh Allen 1-yard run (Tyler Bass kick), 14:27. Rams 38–28. **Drive: 5 plays, 70 yards, 0:51.**
- BUF – Mack Hollins 21-yard pass from Josh Allen (Tyler Bass kick), 8:49. Rams 38–35. **Drive: 10 plays, 91 yards, 4:03.**
- LAR – Puka Nacua 19-yard pass from Matthew Stafford (kick failed, wide left), 1:54. Rams 44–35. **Drive: 11 plays, 71 yards, 6:55.**
- BUF – Josh Allen 1-yard run (Tyler Bass kick), 1:00. Rams 44–42. **Drive: 8 plays, 70 yards, 0:54.**

**Top passers**

- BUF – Josh Allen – 22/37, 342 yards, 3 TD
- LAR – Matthew Stafford – 23/30, 320 yards, 2 TD

**Top rushers**

- BUF – Josh Allen – 10 rushes, 82 yards, 3 TD
- LAR – Kyren Williams – 29 rushes, 87 yards, 2 TD

**Top receivers**

- BUF – Khalil Shakir – 5 receptions, 106 yards, TD
- LAR – Puka Nacua – 12 receptions, 162 yards, TD

Following seven consecutive victories, Buffalo’s dominance took a hard loss from the Rams with Buffalo’s defense constantly struggling to contain the Matthew Stafford led Rams offense with the team gaining multiple points, including a blocked punt by Rams tight end, Hunter Long. The Bills would attempt to come back with touchdowns by Josh Allen, Ty Johnson, Khalil Shakir, and Mack Hollins, but it wouldn’t be enough as an attempted punt return would be stopped as time expired in the game, dropping their record to 10–3. Despite this, Allen had yet another record-breaking performance, including becoming the first player in modern NFL history to score three passing touchdowns and three rushing touchdowns in a single game.

==== Week 15: at Detroit Lions ====
Week 15: Buffalo Bills at Detroit Lions – Game summary

Quarter	1	2	3	4	Total
**Bills**	14	7	14	13	**48**
Lions	0	14	7	21	**42**

at Ford Field, Detroit, Michigan

- Date: December 15
- Game time: 4:25 p.m. EST
- Game weather: None (indoor stadium)
- Game attendance: 65,327
- Referee: Adrian Hill
- TV announcers (CBS): Jim Nantz, Tony Romo and Tracy Wolfson
- Recap, Game Book

Game information

**First quarter**

- BUF – Josh Allen 1-yard run (Tyler Bass kick), 10:56. Bills 7–0. **Drive: 7 plays, 73 yards, 3:06.**
- BUF – Josh Allen 4-yard run (Tyler Bass kick), 2:01. Bills 14–0. **Drive: 9 plays, 78 yards, 5:43.**

**Second quarter**

- DET – Tim Patrick 12-yard pass from Jared Goff (Jake Bates kick), 13:36. Bills 14–7. **Drive: 9 plays, 70 yards, 3:25.**
- BUF – James Cook 6-yard run (Tyler Bass kick), 8:15. Bills 21–7. **Drive: 9 plays, 70 yards, 5:21.**
- DET – Dan Skipper 9-yard pass from Jared Goff (Jake Bates kick), 3:01. Bills 21–14. **Drive: 10 plays, 70 yards, 5:14.**

**Third quarter**

- BUF – James Cook 41-yard run (Tyler Bass kick), 13:11. Bills 28–14. **Drive: 4 plays, 70 yards, 1:49.**
- BUF – Khalil Shakir 3-yard pass from Josh Allen (Tyler Bass kick), 3:31. Bills 35–14. **Drive: 5 plays, 26 yards, 1:37.**
- DET – Amon-Ra St. Brown 66-yard pass from Jared Goff (Jake Bates kick), 1:41. Bills 35–21. **Drive: 5 plays, 70 yards, 1:50.**

**Fourth quarter**

- BUF – Tyler Bass 50-yard field goal, 14:02. Bills 38–21. **Drive: 7 plays, 38 yards, 2:39.**
- DET – Jahmyr Gibbs 12-yard pass from Jared Goff (Jake Bates kick), 12:00. Bills 38–28. **Drive: 5 plays, 70 yards, 2:02.**
- BUF – Ray Davis 5-yard pass from Josh Allen (Tyler Bass kick), 11:51. Bills 45–28. **Drive: 1 play, 5 yards, 0:09.**
- DET – Jahmyr Gibbs 1-yard run (Jake Bates kick), 8:02. Bills 45–35. **Drive: 11 plays, 70 yards, 3:49.**
- BUF – Tyler Bass 41-yard field goal, 2:03. Bills 48–35. **Drive: 10 plays, 47 yards, 5:59.**
- DET – Jameson Williams 3-yard pass from Jared Goff (Jake Bates kick), 0:12. Bills 48–42. **Drive: 16 plays, 70 yards, 1:51.**

**Top passers**

- BUF – Josh Allen – 23/34, 362 yards, 2 TD
- DET – Jared Goff – 38/59, 494 yards, 5 TD

**Top rushers**

- BUF – James Cook – 14 rushes, 105 yards, 2 TD
- DET – Jahmyr Gibbs – 8 rushes, 31 yards, TD

**Top receivers**

- BUF – Ty Johnson – 5 receptions, 114 yards
- DET – Amon-Ra St. Brown – 14 receptions, 193 yards, TD

Following a hard loss the week prior, Buffalo utilized their strong rushing attack in game to gain multiple points. Despite the rare scenario of being the underdogs of the match, Buffalo would start the game off with a 14–0 lead. However, from there, both teams put up good performances against each other during the game, consistently scoring points back and forth. For the Bills, Josh Allen and James Cook rushed for two touchdowns each, Khalil Shakir and Ray Davis each caught passing touchdowns and Tyler Bass made two of his three attempted field goals. However, it would ultimately be Bass’ two field goals that played a factor in the Bills putting the game out of reach of Detroit. To finish it off, Taron Johnson narrowly recovered an onside kick with twelve seconds left in the game, giving the Bills the win. This victory would raise them to an 11–3 record.

==== Week 16: vs. New England Patriots ====
Week 16: New England Patriots at Buffalo Bills – Game summary

Quarter	1	2	3	4	Total
Patriots	7	7	0	7	**21**
**Bills**	0	7	10	7	**24**

at Highmark Stadium, Orchard Park, New York

- Date: December 22
- Game time: 4:25 p.m. EST
- Game weather: Sunny, 14 °F (−10 °C)
- Game attendance: 70,725
- Referee: Brad Allen
- TV announcers (CBS): Ian Eagle, Charles Davis and Evan Washburn
- Recap, Game Book

Game information

**First quarter**

- NE – Kayshon Boutte 28-yard pass from Drake Maye (Joey Slye kick), 12:01. Patriots 7–0. **Drive: 6 plays, 58 yards, 2:59.**

**Second quarter**

- NE – Rhamondre Stevenson 14-yard run (Joey Slye kick), 14:16. Patriots 14–0. **Drive: 16 plays, 91 yards, 9:57.**
- BUF – James Cook 46-yard run (Tyler Bass kick), 11:56. Patriots 14–7. **Drive: 4 plays, 70 yards, 2:20.**

**Third quarter**

- BUF – James Cook 4-yard pass from Josh Allen (Tyler Bass kick), 9:41. Tied 14–14. **Drive: 9 plays, 68 yards, 5:19.**
- BUF – Tyler Bass 50-yard field goal, 6:02. Bills 17–14. **Drive: 6 plays, 10 yards, 3:02.**

**Fourth quarter**

- BUF – Taron Johnson fumble recovery in the end zone (Tyler Bass kick), 10:10. Bills 24–14.
- NE – Hunter Henry 9-yard pass from Drake Maye (Joey Slye kick), 1:13. Bills 24–21. **Drive: 13 plays, 75 yards, 3:16.**

**Top passers**

- NE – Drake Maye – 22/36, 260 yards, 2 TD, INT
- BUF – Josh Allen – 16/29, 154 yards, TD, INT

**Top rushers**

- NE – Rhamondre Stevenson – 12 rushes, 60 yards, TD
- BUF – James Cook – 11 rushes, 100 yards, TD

**Top receivers**

- NE – Kayshon Boutte – 5 receptions, 95 yards, TD
- BUF – James Cook – 3 receptions, 26 yards, TD

After earning an explosive win the previous week, Buffalo began their first meeting of the season against their division rival sluggishly, as both the offense and defense struggled against New England. After trailing 14–0, Buffalo managed to find rhythm and scored 24 unanswered points to make it a two-score game. These points included a rushing touchdown by James Cook, a field goal by Tyler Bass, a passing touchdown from Josh Allen to Cook, and a 0-yard fumble return touchdown by Taron Johnson. New England answered back with another touchdown towards the end of the game, but were unable to recover their onside kick. From there, Buffalo secured enough first-downs to run out the game clock and secure the win. The Bills would now go up to a record of 12–3, improving upon their regular season record from the previous year.

==== Week 17: vs. New York Jets ====
Week 17: New York Jets at Buffalo Bills – Game summary

Quarter	1	2	3	4	Total
Jets	0	0	0	14	**14**
**Bills**	7	5	21	7	**40**

at Highmark Stadium, Orchard Park, New York

- Date: December 29
- Game time: 1:00 p.m. EST
- Game weather: Cloudy, 54 °F (12 °C)
- Game attendance: 70,728
- Referee: Clete Blakeman
- TV announcers (CBS): Jim Nantz, Tony Romo and Tracy Wolfson
- Recap, Game Book

Game information

**First quarter**

- BUF – Josh Allen 1-yard run (Tyler Bass kick), 8:11. Bills 7–0. **Drive: 12 plays, 70 yards, 6:49.**

**Second quarter**

- BUF – Aaron Rodgers sacked in the end zone by A. J. Epenesa for a safety, 2:31. Bills 9–0.
- BUF – Tyler Bass 39-yard field goal, 0:00. Bills 12–0. **Drive: 9 plays, 47 yards, 2:31.**

**Third quarter**

- BUF – Amari Cooper 30-yard pass from Josh Allen (Tyler Bass kick), 5:13. Bills 19–0. **Drive: 5 plays, 38 yards, 2:07.**
- BUF – James Cook 1-yard run (Tyler Bass kick), 1:15. Bills 26–0. **Drive: 5 plays, 37 yards, 1:50.**
- BUF – Keon Coleman 14-yard pass from Josh Allen (Tyler Bass kick), 0:12. Bills 33–0. **Drive: 3 plays, 15 yards, 0:56.**

**Fourth quarter**

- BUF – Tyrell Shavers 69-yard pass from Mitch Trubisky (Tyler Bass kick), 12:37. Bills 40–0. **Drive: 3 plays, 65 yards, 1:38.**
- NYJ – Garrett Wilson 9-yard pass from Tyrod Taylor (Tyrod Taylor–Tyler Conklin pass), 6:59. Bills 40–8. **Drive: 13 plays, 75 yards, 5:38.**
- NYJ – Tyler Conklin 20-yard pass from Tyrod Taylor (pass failed), 1:55. Bills 40–14. **Drive: 8 plays, 58 yards, 2:49.**

**Top passers**

- NYJ – Aaron Rodgers – 12/18, 112 yards, 2 INT
- BUF – Josh Allen – 16/27, 182 yards, 2 TD

**Top rushers**

- NYJ – Breece Hall – 10 rushes, 45 yards
- BUF – James Cook – 15 rushes, 53 yards, TD

**Top receivers**

- NYJ – Garrett Wilson – 7 receptions, 66 yards, TD
- BUF – Tyrell Shavers – 1 reception, 69 yards, TD

After a close game with the Jets earlier in the season, the Bills approached their rematch with dominance by shutting the Jets out 33–0 by the end of the third quarter. Josh Allen scored one rushing touchdown and two passing touchdowns, the latter being caught by Amari Cooper and Keon Coleman. A safety by A.J. Epenesa and a field goal by Tyler Bass contributed to the lead as well. With this performance, the Bills would rest their starters. Shortly after doing so, they scored a 69-yard touchdown pass from Mitchell Trubisky to Tyrell Shavers to make it 40–0. The Jets responded back with two touchdowns, but ultimately had no shot of making a comeback. With this win, the Bills would rise to a 13–3 record and secure the no. 2 seed in the AFC for the third consecutive year.

In addition to this, Allen became the first quarterback in NFL history with 40+ touchdowns in five consecutive seasons, while Cooper eclipsed 10,000 receiving yards across his career. Franchise milestones were also achieved, such as the Bills going undefeated at home for the first time since 1990.

==== Week 18: at New England Patriots ====
Week 18: Buffalo Bills at New England Patriots – Game summary

Quarter	1	2	3	4	Total
Bills	0	10	6	0	**16**
**Patriots**	7	7	3	6	**23**

at Gillette Stadium, Foxborough, Massachusetts

- Date: January 5
- Game time: 1:00 p.m. EST
- Game weather: Cloudy, 33 °F (1 °C)
- Game attendance: 64,626
- Referee: Alan Eck
- TV announcers (CBS): Spero Dedes, Adam Archuleta and Aditi Kinkhabwala
- Recap, Game Book

Game information

**First quarter**

- NE – Joe Milton III 1-yard run (Joey Slye kick), 4:25. Patriots 7–0. **Drive: 13 plays, 55 yards, 7:18.**

**Second quarter**

- BUF – Ray Davis 2-yard pass from Mitch Trubisky (Tyler Bass kick), 12:09. Tied 7–7. **Drive: 13 plays, 75 yards, 7:16.**
- NE – Kayshon Boutte 48-yard pass from Joe Milton III (Joey Slye kick), 9:10. Patriots 14–7. **Drive: 5 plays, 70 yards, 2:59.**
- BUF – Tyler Bass 49-yard field goal, 4:39. Patriots 14–10. **Drive: 8 plays, 39 yards, 4:31.**

**Third quarter**

- BUF – James Cook 1-yard run (kick failed), 7:56. Bills 16–14. **Drive: 5 plays, 16 yards, 2:21.**
- NE – Joey Slye 41-yard field goal, 1:00. Patriots 17–16. **Drive: 12 plays, 54 yards, 6:56.**

**Fourth quarter**

- NE – Joey Slye 42-yard field goal, 8:53. Patriots 20–16. **Drive: 11 plays, 55 yards, 5:09.**
- NE – Joey Slye 50-yard field goal, 1:55. Patriots 23–16. **Drive: 6 plays, 14 yards, 1:19.**

**Top passers**

- BUF – Mitch Trubisky – 15/21, 101 yards, TD
- NE – Joe Milton III – 22/29, 241 yards, TD

**Top rushers**

- BUF – Ray Davis – 15 rushes, 64 yards
- NE – Antonio Gibson – 12 rushes, 41 yards

**Top receivers**

- BUF – Curtis Samuel – 7 receptions, 52 yards
- NE – Kayshon Boutte – 7 receptions, 117 yards

With the no. 2 seed in the AFC secured, the Bills largely played their backups in the final matchup of the regular season, though Josh Allen got the start and played one snap, a hand-off, to continue his active starts streak. Backup quarterback Mitchell Trubisky led the Bills to 16 points including a James Cook touchdown run, which helped Cook tie O. J. Simpson's franchise record for rushing touchdowns in a season. However, the backup defense allowed the Patriots offense, led by backup quarterback Joe Milton III, to score 23 points, resulting in a win for New England that cost them the number one pick in the 2025 NFL draft.

With the loss, the Bills finished the regular season with a 13–4 record. In addition to this, they would score 525 points throughout the season, the highest in franchise history. This surpasses the record of 501 points from 2020.

=== Standings ===
==== Division ====
AFC East
	W	L	T	PCT	DIV	CONF	PF	PA	STK
^{(2)} Buffalo Bills	13	4	0	.765	5–1	9–3	525	368	L1
Miami Dolphins	8	9	0	.471	3–3	6–6	345	364	L1
New York Jets	5	12	0	.294	2–4	5–7	338	404	W1
New England Patriots	4	13	0	.235	2–4	3–9	289	417	W1

==== Conference ====
AFC
Seed	Team	Division	W	L	T	PCT	DIV	CONF	SOS	SOV	STK
**Division leaders**
1	Kansas City Chiefs	West	15	2	0	.882	5–1	10–2	.488	.463	L1
2	Buffalo Bills	East	13	4	0	.765	5–1	9–3	.467	.448	L1
3	Baltimore Ravens	North	12	5	0	.706	4–2	8–4	.529	.525	W4
4	Houston Texans	South	10	7	0	.588	5–1	8–4	.481	.376	W1
**Wild cards**
5	Los Angeles Chargers	West	11	6	0	.647	4–2	8–4	.467	.348	W3
6 (Note: Pittsburgh clinched the #6 seed over Denver based on head-to-head victory.)	Pittsburgh Steelers	North	10	7	0	.588	3–3	7–5	.502	.453	L4
7	Denver Broncos	West	10	7	0	.588	3–3	6–6	.502	.394	W1
**Did not qualify for the postseason**
8	Cincinnati Bengals	North	9	8	0	.529	3–3	6–6	.478	.314	W5
9 (Note: Indianapolis finished ahead of Miami based on head-to-head victory.)	Indianapolis Colts	South	8	9	0	.471	3–3	7–5	.457	.309	W1
10	Miami Dolphins	East	8	9	0	.471	3–3	6–6	.419	.294	L1
11	New York Jets	East	5	12	0	.294	2–4	5–7	.495	.341	W1
12 (Note: Jacksonville finished ahead of New England and Las Vegas based on conference record. (Jacksonville 4–8 to New England 3–9 to Las Vegas 3–9))	Jacksonville Jaguars	South	4	13	0	.235	3–3	4–8	.478	.265	L1
13 (Note: New England finished ahead of Las Vegas based on strength of victory. (New England .471 to Las Vegas .353))	New England Patriots	East	4	13	0	.235	2–4	3–9	.471	.471	W1
14	Las Vegas Raiders	West	4	13	0	.235	0–6	3–9	.540	.353	L1
15 (Note: Cleveland finished ahead of Tennessee based on strength of victory. (Cleveland .510 to Tennessee .431))	Cleveland Browns	North	3	14	0	.176	2–4	3–9	.536	.510	L6
16	Tennessee Titans	South	3	14	0	.176	1–5	3–9	.522	.431	L6
**Tiebreakers** (Note: When breaking ties for three or more teams under the NFL's rules, they are first broken within divisions, then comparing only the highest ranked remaining team from each division.)

== Postseason ==
=== Schedule ===
Round	Date	Opponent (seed)	Result	Record	Venue	Sources
Wild Card	January 12	Denver Broncos (7)	W 31–7	1–0	Highmark Stadium	Recap
Divisional	January 19	Baltimore Ravens (3)	W 27–25	2–0	Highmark Stadium	Recap
AFC Championship	January 26	at Kansas City Chiefs (1)	L 29–32	2–1	Arrowhead Stadium	Recap

=== Game summaries ===
==== AFC Wild Card Playoffs: vs. (7) Denver Broncos ====
AFC Wild Card Playoffs: (7) Denver Broncos at (2) Buffalo Bills – Game Summary

Quarter	1	2	3	4	Total
Broncos	7	0	0	0	7
Bills	3	7	11	10	31

at Highmark Stadium, Orchard Park, New York

- Date: January 12, 2025
- Game time: 1:05 p.m. EST
- Game weather: Cloudy, 32 °F (0 °C)
- Game attendance: 70,332
- Referee: Bill Vinovich
- TV announcers (CBS): Jim Nantz, Tony Romo, Tracy Wolfson and Jay Feely
- Recap, Game Book

Game information

First quarter

- DEN – Troy Franklin 43-yard pass from Bo Nix (Wil Lutz kick), 12:36. Broncos 7–0. Drive: 5 plays, 70 yards, 2:24.
- BUF – Tyler Bass 26-yard field goal, 7:07. Broncos 7–3. Drive: 12 plays, 59 yards, 5:29.

Second quarter

- BUF – James Cook 5-yard run (Tyler Bass kick), 12:57. Bills 10–7. Drive: 13 plays, 81 yards, 7:35.

Third quarter

- BUF – Tyler Bass 27-yard field goal, 10:03. Bills 13–7. Drive: 8 plays, 55 yards, 4:57.
- BUF – Ty Johnson 24-yard pass from Josh Allen (Josh Allen–Keon Coleman pass), 3:06. Bills 21–7. Drive: 9 plays, 73 yards, 5:34.

Fourth quarter

- BUF – Curtis Samuel 55-yard pass from Josh Allen (Tyler Bass kick), 14:49. Bills 28–7. Drive: 3 plays, 59 yards, 1:17.
- BUF – Tyler Bass 34-yard field goal, 4:37. Bills 31–7. Drive: 14 plays, 70 yards, 6:55.

Top passers

- DEN – Bo Nix – 13/22, 144 yards, TD
- BUF – Josh Allen – 20/26, 272 yards, 2 TD

Top rushers

- DEN – Bo Nix – 4 rushes, 43 yards
- BUF – James Cook – 23 rushes, 120 yards, TD

Top receivers

- DEN – Courtland Sutton – 5 receptions, 75 yards
- BUF – Curtis Samuel – 3 receptions, 68 yards, TD

This was the second playoff meeting between Buffalo and Denver; the first was in the 1991 AFC Championship when the Bills beat the Broncos 10–7 in Buffalo to reach Super Bowl XXVI. The Bills and the Broncos did not meet in the regular season. It was Denver's first postseason appearance since winning Super Bowl 50 nine years earlier.

On the opening possession of the game, rookie Bo Nix capped a five-play opening drive with a 43-yard touchdown pass to former college teammate Troy Franklin. The Bills responded with a field goal by Tyler Bass to cap a 12-play drive on their opening possession and then forced a quick three-and-out to get the ball back. James Cook added a touchdown on a 5-yard run early in the second quarter to give the Bills a 10–7 lead. Before the end of the first half, Broncos kicker Wil Lutz missed a 50-yard field goal that would have tied the game at 10–10.

After Bass knocked home a 27-yard field goal at the beginning of the third quarter, leading 13–7, Buffalo broke open the game with a Josh Allen touchdown pass to Ty Johnson on fourth down with 3:06 left in the third quarter. The score held up following a replay review, which showed Johnson's foot touching out of bounds but only after he secured the ball. Moments later, a two-point conversion was successful on an Allen pass to Keon Coleman. On the first play of the fourth quarter, Allen's 55-yard touchdown pass to Curtis Samuel effectively sealed the game for Buffalo. Bass added two more field goals, with the final score being 31–7. The Bills methodically wore down the Broncos in the game with a combined 210 yards rushing (120 yards from Cook, 46 from Allen, 44 from Johnson). Allen added 272 yards through the air, with two touchdowns.

==== AFC Divisional Playoffs: vs. (3) Baltimore Ravens ====
AFC Divisional Playoffs: (3) Baltimore Ravens at (2) Buffalo Bills – Game Summary

Quarter	1	2	3	4	Total
Ravens	7	3	9	6	25
Bills	7	14	0	6	27

at Highmark Stadium, Orchard Park, New York

- Date: January 19, 2025
- Game time: 6:40 p.m. EST
- Game weather: Cloudy, 19 °F (−7 °C)
- Game attendance: 70,697
- Referee: Carl Cheffers
- TV announcers (CBS): Jim Nantz, Tony Romo, Tracy Wolfson and Jay Feely
- Recap, Game Book

Game information

First quarter

- BAL – Rashod Bateman 16-yard pass from Lamar Jackson (Justin Tucker kick), 10:40. Ravens 7–0. Drive: 8 plays, 73 yards, 4:20.
- BUF – Ray Davis 1-yard run (Tyler Bass kick), 4:43. Tied 7–7. Drive: 11 plays, 70 yards, 5:57.

Second quarter

- BUF – Josh Allen 1-yard run (Tyler Bass kick), 8:52. Bills 14–7. Drive: 4 plays, 24 yards, 2:13.
- BAL – Justin Tucker 26-yard field goal, 3:43. Bills 14–10. Drive: 9 plays, 57 yards, 5:09.
- BUF – Josh Allen 4-yard run (Tyler Bass kick), 0:16. Bills 21–10. Drive: 9 plays, 70 yards, 3:27.

Third quarter

- BAL – Justin Tucker 47-yard field goal, 9:47. Bills 21–13. Drive: 9 plays, 35 yards, 4:01.
- BAL – Derrick Henry 5-yard run (pass failed), 1:37. Bills 21–19. Drive: 7 plays, 80 yards, 3:44.

Fourth quarter

- BUF – Tyler Bass 51-yard field goal, 12:04. Bills 24–19. Drive: 10 plays, 37 yards, 4:33.
- BUF – Tyler Bass 21-yard field goal, 3:29. Bills 27–19. Drive: 11 plays, 52 yards, 5:12.
- BAL – Isaiah Likely 24-yard pass from Lamar Jackson (pass failed), 1:33. Bills 27–25. Drive: 8 plays, 88 yards, 1:56.

Top passers

- BAL – Lamar Jackson – 18/25, 254 yards, 2 TD, INT
- BUF – Josh Allen – 16/22, 127 yards

Top rushers

- BAL – Derrick Henry – 16 rushes, 84 yards, TD
- BUF – James Cook – 17 rushes, 67 yards

Top receivers

- BAL – Isaiah Likely – 4 receptions, 73 yards, TD
- BUF – Khalil Shakir – 6 receptions, 67 yards

This was the second overall playoff meeting between the Bills and Ravens. In their only other meeting, the Bills won the 2020 AFC Divisional Game, 17–3. In the regular season, the Ravens defeated the Bills 35–10 during Week 4 in Baltimore. This game featured the two favorites for the NFL MVP, Bills quarterback Josh Allen and Ravens quarterback Lamar Jackson.

Before the game, at a press conference on January 13, Ravens head coach John Harbaugh, alongside the rest of the press conference, laughed when a reporter called Buffalo a "city of losers" about a clip he made on his radio show. As the Ravens took the field, the Bills played the clip from the radio show over the stadium loud-speakers resulting in a chorus of boos from fans.

The Ravens received to start the game. The teams traded touchdowns on their opening dives, with a 16-yard Jackson pass to Rashod Bateman being followed by a drive that ended with a 1-yard Ray Davis rushing touchdown for the Bills. On the subsequent drive, Jackson threw an interception to Buffalo safety Taylor Rapp; the Bills failed to score and punted after four plays. The Ravens started from their 9-yard line and drove the ball to the Buffalo 28-yard line but Jackson fumbled the ball when being sacked by Damar Hamlin saw Von Miller recover the fumble and return it to the Baltimore 24-yard line. Four plays later, Josh Allen scored on a tush push rush to give Buffalo the lead. The Ravens marched the ball down the field on their next drive (getting as close as the 2-yard line) before being stopped on the goal line, which saw them decide to have Justin Tucker kicked a 26-yard field goal to narrow the deficit. The Bills responded by also marching the ball down the field (going 70 yards in 3:27) with Allen again scoring a rushing touchdown on a 4-yard play action draw that saw Buffalo go up 21–10 with 0:16 in the first half.

The Bills received the ball to start the half but punted after three plays. The Ravens drove from their 36-yard line to the Buffalo 27-yard line but could not get any further and elected to take the field goal by Tucker from 47 yards out to make it 21–13. The Bills continued to struggle, again punting on their next drive. The Ravens went 80 yards in seven plays, scoring off a Derrick Henry 5-yard run; however, the two-point conversion attempt to try and tie the game was batted down by Bills linebacker Matt Milano for an incompletion. Starting at their own 30, the Bills went 37 yards to set up a 51-yard field goal attempt by Tyler Bass to make the score 24–19 with 12:04 remaining in the fourth quarter. On the next drive, when Jackson completed a pass to tight end Mark Andrews to the 44-yard line of Buffalo, Terrel Bernard forced a fumble that he recovered to give Buffalo the ball. The Bills responded with a grinding drive of 52 yards that took five minutes off the clock and culminated with Bass making a 21-yard field goal (after Buffalo elected to kick on 4th-and-goal from the 2-yard line) with 3:29 remaining to give Buffalo a 27–19 lead. A subsequent penalty on the kick return meant Baltimore started at their own 2-yard line. The Ravens drove down the field quickly, going 88 yards in eight plays that saw Jackson throw a 24-yard pass to Isaiah Likely in the end zone to cut the deficit to two. On the two-point conversion attempt, Jackson threw it to Andrews near the pylon, but Andrews dropped the pass. With 1:33 remaining, the Ravens attempted an onside kick, but Rasul Douglas recovered it for the Bills. Buffalo had one 17-yard running play to burn the last Ravens timeout before kneeling the ball to end the game.

The Ravens outgained the Bills in total yards (416–273) while punting zero times but had three turnovers, while Buffalo had none while not trailing after the first quarter. With the win, Buffalo was guaranteed to face Kansas City for the fourth time in the last five postseasons in the AFC Championship Game; the last time Buffalo had played in the AFC Championship Game was in 2021 against the Chiefs.

==== AFC Championship: at (1) Kansas City Chiefs ====
AFC Championship: (2) Buffalo Bills at (1) Kansas City Chiefs – Game summary

Quarter	1	2	3	4	Total
Bills	3	13	6	7	29
Chiefs	7	14	0	11	32

at Arrowhead Stadium, Kansas City, Missouri

- Date: January 26, 2025
- Game time: 6:40 p.m. EST/5:40 p.m. CST
- Game weather: 31 °F (−1 °C)
- Game attendance: 73,487
- Referee: Clete Blakeman
- TV announcers (CBS): Jim Nantz, Tony Romo, Tracy Wolfson, Evan Washburn and Jay Feely
- Recap, Game Book

Game information

First quarter

- KC – Kareem Hunt 12-yard run (Harrison Butker kick), 8:56. Chiefs 7–0. Drive: 9 plays, 90 yards, 5:05.
- BUF – Tyler Bass 53-yard field goal, 3:45. Chiefs 7–3. Drive: 10 plays, 35 yards, 5:11.

Second quarter

- BUF – James Cook 6-yard run (Tyler Bass kick), 10:25. Bills 10–7. Drive: 10 plays, 72 yards, 5:32.
- KC – Xavier Worthy 11-yard pass from Patrick Mahomes (Harrison Butker kick), 4:13. Chiefs 14–10. Drive: 11 plays, 70 yards, 6:12.
- KC – Patrick Mahomes 1-yard run (Harrison Butker kick), 1:55. Chiefs 21–10. Drive: 6 plays, 34 yards, 1:44.
- BUF – Mack Hollins 34-yard pass from Josh Allen (run failed), 0:23. Chiefs 21–16. Drive: 7 plays, 73 yards, 1:32.

Third quarter

- BUF – James Cook 1-yard run (pass failed), 2:56. Bills 22–21. Drive: 12 plays, 80 yards, 7:05.

Fourth quarter

- KC – Patrick Mahomes 10-yard run (Patrick Mahomes–Justin Watson pass), 10:14. Chiefs 29–22. Drive: 5 plays, 59 yards, 2:41.
- BUF – Curtis Samuel 4-yard pass from Josh Allen (Tyler Bass kick), 6:15. Tied 29–29. Drive: 9 plays, 70 yards, 3:59.
- KC – Harrison Butker 35-yard field goal, 3:33. Chiefs 32–29. Drive: 8 plays, 51 yards, 2:42.

Top passers

- BUF – Josh Allen – 22/34, 237 yards, 2 TD
- KC – Patrick Mahomes – 18/26, 245 yards, TD

Top rushers

- BUF – James Cook – 13 rushes, 85 yards, TD
- KC – Kareem Hunt – 17 rushes, 64 yards, TD

Top receivers

- BUF – Mack Hollins – 3 receptions, 73 yards, TD
- KC – Xavier Worthy – 6 receptions, 85 yards, TD

This was the fourth meeting between Patrick Mahomes and Josh Allen in the postseason, and their second meeting in the AFC Championship. Earlier in the season, Buffalo secured a 30–21 win at home in Week 11, and attempted to secure another win for the Championship in the postseason.

The game began with Buffalo receiving the ball first and being forced to punt. Like the Broncos and Ravens games, Kansas City would score first from Kareem Hunt's 12-yard run to make it 7–0. Tyler Bass' 53-yard field goal kick would put the Bills on the board at 7–3. In the second quarter, after Mahomes fumbled the ball, James Cook's 6-yard run would give the Bills a 10–7 lead. However, the lead was cut shortly after Xavier Worthy gave the Chiefs a 14–10 lead. After the Bills forced a punt, a controversial catch was made by the Chiefs as the ball appeared to land on the ground. Sean McDermott would throw a challenge flag to overturn the call as incomplete pass, but after review, the call stood, leading to a 1-yard run by Mahomes to make it 21–10. The Bills would immediately respond with Mack Hollins’ 34-yard pass to make it 21–16 before halftime.

The second half saw some adjustments by the Bills as they would stop the Chiefs in the opening drive. The Bills would regain the lead from James Cook's leaping reach to the endzone, making it 22–21. However, the Bills failed to convert the 2-point for the second time after the Mack Hollins touchdown. The Bills would stop the Chiefs once again and thus have a chance to extend the lead. However, another controversy sparked when Allen supposedly made the 1st down from a 4th down conversion, but the officials reviewed it as a turnover on downs.

The Chiefs would get the ball at midfield as Patrick Mahomes's 10-yard run brought the lead back and successfully converted 2 points, making it 29–22 Kansas City. The Bills would respond with a Curtis Samuel 4-yard pass, tying the game 29–29. The Chiefs would keep their momentum from the turnover on downs, but the Bills would successfully prevent the Chiefs from scoring a touchdown. With Harrison Butker's 35-yard field goal kick, Kansas City gained the lead again, at 32–29.

With 3:33 left on the clock, the Bills regained possession of the ball. After a couple of plays, the Bills reached a 4th and 5 with a two-minute warning. Following the warning, the Bills' offensive line was not able to contain the Chiefs defenders rushed to Josh Allen, pressuring him to throw the ball. The ball slightly landed in the hands of Dalton Kincaid, but dropped it, thus sealing the game in favor of Kansas City. The Chiefs would get a couple of first downs to further cement their win. The Bills' season ended with their fourth postseason loss to the Chiefs over the course of five postseasons.
