= Ray Davis (American football) =

American football player (born 1999)

No. 7 – Buffalo Bills
- Positions: Running back, kick returner
- Roster status: Active

Personal information
- Born: November 20, 1999 (age 27); San Francisco, California, U.S.
- Listed height: 5 ft 8 in (1.73 m)
- Listed weight: 211 lb (96 kg)

Career information
- High school: Blair (Blairstown, New Jersey)
- College: Temple (2019–2020); Vanderbilt (2021–2022); Kentucky (2023)
- NFL draft: 2024: 4th round, 128th overall pick

Career history
- Buffalo Bills (2024–present)

Awards and highlights
- First-team All-Pro (2025) (Note: Selected as a kick returner); First-team All-SEC (2023)

Career NFL statistics as of Week 11, 2026
- Rushing yards: 772
- Rushing average: 4.1
- Rushing touchdowns: 3
- Receptions: 31
- Receiving yards: 321
- Receiving touchdowns: 5
- Return yards: 1,481
- Return touchdowns: 1
- Stats at Pro Football Reference

Re'Mahn Walter Zhamar Jamar Davis (born November 20, 1999) is an American professional football running back and kick returner for the Buffalo Bills of the National Football League (NFL). He played college football for the Temple Owls, Vanderbilt Commodores, and Kentucky Wildcats.

== Early life ==
Davis was born on November 20, 1999, in San Francisco, California, and has 14 siblings. He spent time in foster care as a child due to both his parents being incarcerated. Realizing he needed a positive role model and stability in his life; Davis asked for a Big Brother through the Big Brothers Big Sisters of America program. Patrick Dowley became his Big Brother, who Davis credits with turning his life around. In an NFL game in December 2024, Dowley was honored in a pregame ceremony. Davis attended Trinity-Pawling School in New York before spending a post-graduate year at Blair Academy due to poor academic grades. At Blair, he ran for 1,698 yards and 35 touchdowns while playing eight games. He finished his high school career with 4,815 yards and 48 touchdowns scored on offense while having posted 80 tackles and six interceptions on defense.

== College career ==
Davis began playing college football for the Temple Owls in 2019, running for 936 yards and eight touchdowns as a freshman and being named first-team Freshman All-American by Pro Football Focus (PFF). The following year, he ran for 323 yards in four games before entering the NCAA transfer portal.

Davis transferred to play for the Vanderbilt Commodores. In 2021, he had 211 rushing yards with a touchdown in his first three games before missing the rest of the year due to injury. He ran for 1,042 yards with five touchdowns in the 2022 season, earning fourth-team All-Southeastern Conference (SEC) honors while having five 100-yard games and being a semifinalist for the SEC Comeback Player of the Year award.

Davis entered the transfer portal a second time for his final year of eligibility in 2023, choosing to play for the Kentucky Wildcats. In his Kentucky debut, he ran for 112 yards and scored two touchdowns while averaging eight yards-per-carry. Against the 22nd-ranked Florida Gators, he ran for 280 yards and scored four touchdowns.

== Professional career ==
Pre-draft measurables
Height	Weight	Arm length	Hand span	Wingspan	40-yard dash	10-yard split	20-yard split	20-yard shuttle	Vertical jump	Broad jump	Bench press
5 ft 8 3/8 in (1.74 m)	211 lb (96 kg)	30 1/4 in (0.77 m)	8 7/8 in (0.23 m)	6 ft 0 1/4 in (1.84 m)	4.52 s	1.56 s	2.67 s	4.33 s	35.0 in (0.89 m)	9 ft 11 in (3.02 m)	21 reps
All values from NFL Combine/Pro Day

=== 2024 season ===
Davis was selected by the Buffalo Bills with the 128th overall pick in the fourth round in the 2024 NFL draft. He scored his first career touchdown in a week 3 47–10 win over the Jacksonville Jaguars. Davis became the secondary back in Buffalo's running back tandem alongside primary tailback James Cook and third down back Ty Johnson. On the season, he finished third on the team with 442 yards after Cook and quarterback Josh Allen, also rushing for three touchdowns, but also caught 17 passes for 189 yards and three receiving touchdowns, including a season long 63-yard touchdown pass against the Miami Dolphins.

During the Bills' wild card round playoff game against the Denver Broncos, Davis suffered a hit to the head after colliding with Broncos safety Brandon Jones while reaching for a pass from Allen. Davis was ruled out of the game and entered concussion protocol. Davis returned to the field for the Bills divisional round matchup with the Baltimore Ravens, where he rushed for 29 yards and his first playoff touchdown.

=== 2025 season ===
Davis, who once kicked a 57-yard field goal while in high school, was auditioned as the Bills' backup kicker during the team's August 9, 2025 preseason game against the New York Giants. Davis was successful in his lone extra point attempt during the contest, filling in for the injured Tyler Bass.

With Ty Johnson becoming the primary change-of-pace back behind Cook, Davis took on more special teams duties in 2025, becoming the Bills' primary kick returner after Week 8. He scored on a 97-yard return against the Houston Texans, and also had a role in helping the Bills defeat the New England Patriots, averaging 41 yards per return against New England. With Cook resting the final regular season game against the New York Jets, Davis played most snaps at running back, rushing for 151 yards on 21 carries and catching two passes for 23 yards and a touchdown.

Davis finished with reduced rushing stats compared to his rookie season but returned 31 kickoffs in the regular season for the Bills for 943 yards and one touchdown, finishing with 1,304 all-purpose yards. He was named a first-team All-Pro as a kick returner.

== Career statistics ==
=== NFL ===
Legend
	Led the league
**Bold**	Career high

==== Regular season ====
Year	Team	Games		Rushing					Receiving						Kickoff Returns				
Year	Team	GP	GS	Att	Yds	Avg	Lng	TD	Tgt	Rec	Yds	Avg	Lng	TD	Ret	Yds	Avg	Lng	TD
2024	BUF	17	0	**113**	**442**	3.9	**23**	**3**	**19**	**17**	**189**	11.1	**63**	**3**	7	147	21.0	26	0
2025	BUF	17	0	58	275	**4.7**	**23**	0	13	10	86	8.6	21	2	**31**	**943**	**30.4**	**97**	**1**
2026	BUF	10	0	17	55	3.2	7	0	6	4	46	**11.5**	31	0	13	391	30.1	70	0
Career		44	0	188	772	4.1	23	3	38	31	321	10.4	63	5	51	1,481	29.0	97	1

==== Postseason ====
Year	Team	Games		Rushing					Receiving						Kickoff Returns				
Year	Team	GP	GS	Att	Yds	Avg	Lng	TD	Tgt	Rec	Yds	Avg	Lng	TD	Ret	Yds	Avg	Lng	TD
2024	BUF	3	0	**7**	**36**	**5.1**	**16**	**1**	0	0	0	—	0	0	2	53	26.5	28	0
2025	BUF	2	0	0	0	—	0	0	**2**	**2**	**33**	**16.5**	**24**	0	**9**	**249**	**27.7**	**34**	0
Career		5	0	7	36	5.1	16	1	2	2	33	16.5	24	0	11	302	27.5	34	0

=== College ===
Year	Team	Games		Rushing				Receiving			
Year	Team	GP	GS	Att	Yards	Avg	TD	Rec	Yards	Avg	TD
2019	Temple	12	5	193	936	4.8	8	15	181	**12.1**	2
2020	Temple	4	4	78	308	3.9	1	12	62	5.2	0
2021	Vanderbilt	3	3	44	211	4.8	1	5	27	5.4	0
2022	Vanderbilt	12	12	**232**	1,042	4.5	5	29	169	5.8	3
2023	Kentucky	13	13	199	**1,129**	**5.7**	**14**	**33**	**323**	9.8	**7**
Career		44	37	746	3,626	4.9	29	94	762	8.1	12
