= Keon Coleman =

American football player (born 2003)

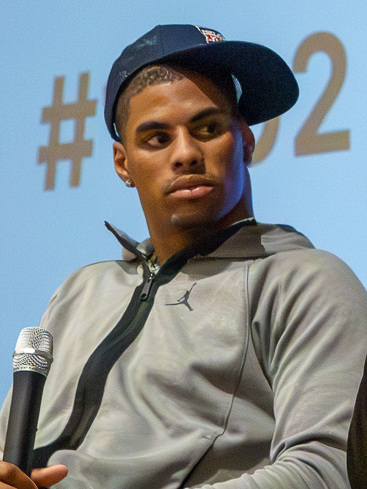
- Coleman in 2025

No. 0 – Buffalo Bills
- Position: Wide receiver
- Roster status: Active

Personal information
- Born: May 17, 2003 (age 23); Opelousas, Louisiana, U.S.
- Listed height: 6 ft 3 in (1.91 m)
- Listed weight: 213 lb (97 kg)

Career information
- High school: Opelousas Catholic
- College: Michigan State (2021–2022); Florida State (2023)
- NFL draft: 2024: 2nd round, 33rd overall pick

Career history
- Buffalo Bills (2024–present)

Awards and highlights
- First-team All-ACC (2023); Third-team All-Big Ten (2022)

Career NFL statistics as of Week 11, 2026
- Receptions: 93
- Receiving yards: 1,292
- Receiving touchdowns: 11
- Stats at Pro Football Reference

Keon Coleman (born May 17, 2003) is an American professional football wide receiver for the Buffalo Bills of the National Football League (NFL). He played college football for the Michigan State Spartans and Florida State Seminoles and was selected by the Bills in the second round of the 2024 NFL draft.

== Early life ==
Coleman attended Opelousas Catholic School in Opelousas, Louisiana. He played both football and basketball in high school. He committed to Michigan State University to play college football and college basketball.

== College career ==
As a true freshman at Michigan State in 2021, Coleman played in 10 games and had seven receptions for 50 yards and a touchdown. After the season, he played in six games for the school's basketball team. As a sophomore in 2022, he became a starter and led the team in receiving yards. He transferred to Florida State University to play for the Seminoles in 2023. He was named First Team All-ACC at the wide receiver, all-purpose, and specialist positions, joining Will Shipley as the only college football players to earn first-team honors at three positions. On December 21, 2023, Coleman declared for the 2024 NFL draft, skipping Florida State's matchup with Georgia in the Orange Bowl after the team was not selected for the College Football Playoff despite an undefeated record.

== Professional career ==
Pre-draft measurables
Height	Weight	Arm length	Hand span	Wingspan	40-yard dash	10-yard split	20-yard split	Vertical jump	Broad jump
6 ft 3 1/4 in (1.91 m)	213 lb (97 kg)	32 1/8 in (0.82 m)	9 3/8 in (0.24 m)	6 ft 6 1/8 in (1.98 m)	4.61 s	1.54 s	2.68 s	38.0 in (0.97 m)	10 ft 7 in (3.23 m)
All values from NFL Combine

=== 2024 ===
Coleman was selected by the Buffalo Bills with the 33rd pick of the 2024 NFL draft. The Bills, who initially held the 28th selection, traded down several spots from the first round. Coleman signed his four-year rookie contract with the Bills on June 12, 2024.

In his first professional game, Coleman led the Bills in receiving yards and receptions during a 34–28 Week 1 win over the Arizona Cardinals, catching four of five targets for 51 yards. In Week 3, Coleman caught his first career touchdown in a 47–10 win over the Jacksonville Jaguars, despite being forced to sit out the first quarter for being late to a team meeting that week. In Week 7, Coleman recorded his first 100-yard receiving game against the Tennessee Titans, catching four passes for 125 yards in the 34-10 victory. The performance earned Coleman the Pepsi NFL Rookie of the Week award. Coleman injured his wrist during the Bills' week 9 game against the Miami Dolphins as he was hit by Dolphins safety and former Bill Jordan Poyer, with the play drawing a personal foul penalty on Miami and helping set up the Bills' game-winning field goal. The injury caused Coleman to miss several weeks. He finished his rookie season with 29 receptions for 556 yards and four touchdowns in 13 games.

=== 2025 ===
The following season, after fully recovering from his injury, Coleman played a pivotal role in Buffalo's come-from-behind win over the Baltimore Ravens in week 1 with 112 receiving yards and a touchdown, including a crucial reception that set up the game-winning field goal by Matt Prater. The next few weeks of the season saw Coleman's production dip. He was forced to miss the Bills' opening offensive drive against the New England Patriots for disciplinary purposes before losing a fumble later in what turned out to be a 23-20 loss to the Patriots, and was made a healthy inactive against the Tampa Bay Buccaneers for missing a team meeting after further struggles during the season. Coleman finished his sophomore season with 404 receiving yards and 4 touchdowns, despite being made inactive for four games. He was thrust back into an active role in the playoffs due to injuries to the Bills' receiving corps.

On January 21, 2026, Bills owner Terry Pegula caused a stir when he made remarks directed towards the drafting of Coleman during the Bills press conference held to address the firing of Sean McDermott. When general manager Brandon Beane, who was recently given the additional role of President of Football Operations, was asked by the media about the lack of talent at certain positions, particularly at the wide receiver position and especially regarding Coleman's performance over his first two seasons, Pegula interrupted, stating, "I'll address the Keon situation. The coaching staff pushed to draft Keon," and "I'm not saying Brandon wouldn't have drafted him, but [Coleman] wasn't his next choice." He then continued on, stating how Beane took the advice of the coaching staff when making the pick. Beane then clarified that he made the pick despite differences in personnel compared to the coaching staff while reaffirming his commitment to developing Coleman for at least the remainder of his contract. Following the press conference, various media outlets and analysts speculated that Coleman's future with the Bills was in jeopardy.

=== 2026 ===
In the offseason, the Bills traded for former Chicago Bears receiver D. J. Moore and drafted Skyler Bell to help bolster the receiving corps. However, Moore was sidelined several games due to a shoulder sprain, forcing Coleman into a larger role again. Coleman's production became more consistent. He had a strong performance against New England in week four, catching a team-leading 6 passes for 116 yards and a touchdown despite the Bills losing 29-26, starting a streak of games in which he caught a touchdown. During a week 6 win against the Las Vegas Raiders, Coleman led the team in receiving once again with 4 catches for 59 yards and a touchdown.

== Career statistics ==
=== NFL ===
==== Regular season ====
Year	Team	Games		Receiving							Fumbles	
Year	Team	GP	GS	Tgt	Rec	Yds	Avg	Y/G	Lng	TD	Fum	Lost
2024	BUF	13	12	57	29	556	19.2	42.8	64	4	0	0
2025	BUF	13	6	59	38	404	10.6	31.1	37	4	1	1
2026	BUF	10	3	40	26	332	12.8	33.2	37	3	0	0
Career		36	21	156	93	1,292	13.9	35.9	64	11	1	1

==== Playoffs ====
Year	Team	Games		Receiving							Fumbles	
Year	Team	GP	GS	Tgt	Rec	Yds	Avg	Y/G	Lng	TD	Fum	Lost
2024	BUF	3	2	8	3	22	7.3	7.3	12	0	0	0
2025	BUF	2	0	4	2	46	23.0	23.0	36	1	0	0
Career		5	2	12	5	68	13.6	13.6	36	1	0	0

=== College ===
College statistics
Year	Team	Games		Receiving			
Year	Team	GP	GS	Rec	Yds	Avg	TD
2021	Michigan State	10	0	7	50	7.1	1
2022	Michigan State	12	11	58	798	13.8	7
2023	Florida State	12	12	50	658	13.2	11
Career		34	23	115	1,506	13.1	19
