= Khalil Shakir =

American football player (born 2000)

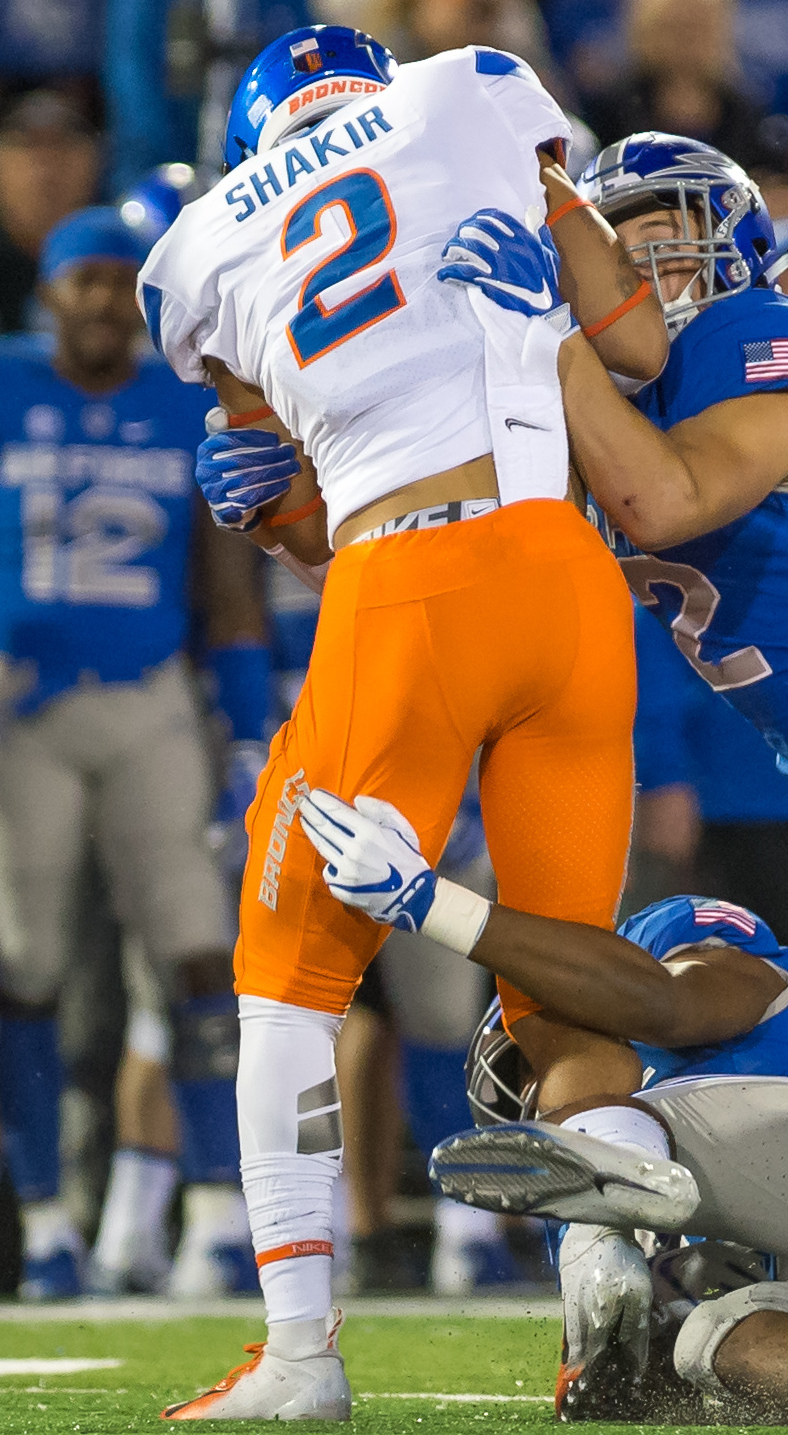
- Shakir with the Boise State Broncos in 2018

No. 10 – Buffalo Bills
- Position: Wide receiver
- Roster status: Active

Personal information
- Born: February 3, 2000 (age 26); Murrieta, California, U.S.
- Listed height: 6 ft 0 in (1.83 m)
- Listed weight: 190 lb (86 kg)

Career information
- High school: Vista Murrieta
- College: Boise State (2018–2021)
- NFL draft: 2022: 5th round, 148th overall pick

Career history
- Buffalo Bills (2022–present)

Awards and highlights
- 2× First-team All-Mountain West (2020, 2021)

Career NFL statistics as of Week 11, 2026
- Receptions: 235
- Receiving yards: 2,851
- Receiving touchdowns: 12
- Stats at Pro Football Reference

Khalil Shakir (born February 3, 2000) is an American professional football wide receiver for the Buffalo Bills of the National Football League (NFL). He played college football for the Boise State Broncos and was selected by the Bills in the fifth round of the 2022 NFL draft.

== Early life ==
Khalil's father was a Master Gunnery Sergeant in the Marine Corps. As a child, Shakir spent time in Hawaii and Japan. Shakir attended Vista Murrieta High School in Murrieta, California. He committed to Boise State University to play college football.

== College career ==
Shakir appeared in 10 games with one start as a true freshman at Boise State in 2018. He had 16 receptions for 170 yards with one receiving touchdown and one rushing. As a sophomore in 2019, he started five of 14 games, recording 63 receptions for 872 yards with six receiving touchdowns and three rushing touchdowns. Shakir started all seven games his junior year in 2020 and had 52 receptions for 719 yards and six touchdowns. Shakir returned to Boise State for his senior season in 2021 and caught 77 passes for 1,117 yards and 7 touchdowns.

== Professional career ==
Pre-draft measurables
Height	Weight	Arm length	Hand span	Wingspan	40-yard dash	10-yard split	20-yard split	20-yard shuttle	Three-cone drill	Vertical jump	Broad jump	Bench press
5 ft 11 7/8 in (1.83 m)	196 lb (89 kg)	29 in (0.74 m)	9 1/2 in (0.24 m)	5 ft 10 3/8 in (1.79 m)	4.43 s	1.49 s	2.53 s	4.21 s	7.28 s	38.5 in (0.98 m)	10 ft 4 in (3.15 m)	16 reps
All values from NFL Combine/Pro Day

The Buffalo Bills selected Shakir in the fifth round, 148th overall, of the 2022 NFL draft. Shakir caught his first touchdown pass in Week 5 against the Pittsburgh Steelers in a 38–3 Buffalo victory. In his rookie season, he appeared in 14 games and recorded 10 receptions for 161 receiving yards and one receiving touchdown.

Shakir's role expanded in 2023. Despite a slow start to the season as Buffalo's number 3 receiver, he became one of Josh Allen's top targets by the end of the year. Shakir had a breakout game against the Tampa Bay Buccaneers in week 8, catching six passes for a then-career-high 92 yards, before eclipsing that performance against the New York Jets in week 11 with three catches for 115 yards, with 81 of those yards coming on a third-quarter catch-and-run touchdown. Shakir finished the 2023 season with 611 receiving yards and two touchdowns, catching 39 of 45 targets, which was the top catch percentage by any receiver in the league at 86.7%. Shakir continued to help the Bills in the playoffs, catching a touchdown in both their games, including a 17-yard score in which he shrugged off Steelers safety Minkah Fitzpatrick after a short pass, balanced himself without falling down, and ran in the rest of the way for the touchdown.

Entering the 2024 season, Shakir became the lone remaining starting wide receiver on the Bills from the previous year, as Stefon Diggs was traded and Gabe Davis left in free agency. Shakir started the 2024 season strong as Buffalo's leading receiver, catching his first 17 targets to surpass 30 consecutive catches dating from the previous season and breaking the record previously set by Michael Thomas at 27 consecutive catches. However, he suffered an ankle injury against the Baltimore Ravens and missed the following game as a result. He led the team in receiving that year with 821 receiving yards.

On February 25, 2025, Shakir signed a four-year contract extension through the 2029 season worth $60.2 million with $32 million guaranteed. Shakir once again finished as Buffalo's leading receiver in 2025 with 719 receiving yards. It was noted that in the two years since Diggs' departure, the Bills' passing offense became more focused on short yardage plays, with Shakir operating primarily out of the slot for screen passes and yards after catch due to a perceived lack of downfield catching talent in Buffalo.

== NFL career statistics ==
Legend
**Bold**	Career high

=== Regular season ===
Year	Team	Games		Receiving					Rushing					Returning					Fumbles	
Year	Team	GP	GS	Rec	Yds	Y/R	Lng	TD	Att	Yds	Y/R	Lng	TD	Ret	Yds	Y/R	Lng	TD	Fum	Lost
2022	BUF	14	2	10	161	**16.1**	31	1	0	0	—	0	0	4	57	**14.3**	**34**	0	0	0
2023	BUF	17	10	39	611	15.7	**81**	2	1	10	**10.0**	10	0	10	**135**	13.5	27	0	**1**	0
2024	BUF	15	9	**76**	**821**	10.8	52	**4**	2	4	2.0	2	0	0	0	0.0	0	0	**1**	0
2025	BUF	16	10	72	719	10.0	54	**4**	1	5	5.0	5	0	**16**	124	7.8	28	0	**1**	**1**
2026	BUF	10	10	38	539	14.2	57	1	**5**	**31**	6.2	**13**	0	1	11	11.0	11	0	**1**	**1**
Career		72	43	235	2,851	12.1	81	12	9	50	5.6	13	0	31	327	10.5	34	0	3	1

=== Postseason ===
Year	Team	Games		Receiving					Fumbles	
Year	Team	GP	GS	Rec	Yds	Y/R	Lng	TD	Fum	Lost
2022	BUF	2	0	5	91	**18.2**	31	0	0	0
2023	BUF	2	2	10	75	7.5	17	**2**	0	0
2024	BUF	3	3	18	**174**	9.7	34	0	0	0
2025	BUF	2	2	**19**	157	8.3	**46**	0	0	0
Career		9	7	52	497	9.6	46	2	0	0

== Personal life ==
Shakir has Samoan and Tongan ancestry.

Shakir married his wife, Sayler, in March 2023. They met while attending classes at Boise State University. Their daughter, Sunny, was born in November 2025.

The Shakirs are active in animal advocacy. In August 2025, Shakir saved 19 dogs from euthanasia, with help from the Buffalo-based Nickel City Canine Rescue. Earlier that same year, the Shakirs rescued an additional 26 dogs, with the assist of a transport. They have hosted several dog adoption events, and established the Shakir Family Foundation, a charity that is dedicated to animal welfare, in addition to supporting the military community.
