= Te'Cory Couch =

American football player (born 1999)

No. 33 – Buffalo Bills
- Position: Cornerback
- Roster status: Practice squad

Personal information
- Born: September 6, 1999 (age 27); Fort Lauderdale, Florida, U.S.
- Listed height: 5 ft 10 in (1.78 m)
- Listed weight: 185 lb (84 kg)

Career information
- High school: Chaminade-Madonna (Hollywood, Florida)
- College: Miami (FL) (2019–2023)
- NFL draft: 2024: undrafted

Career history
- Buffalo Bills (2024–present)

Career NFL statistics as of Week 9, 2026
- Total tackles: 8
- Stats at Pro Football Reference

Te'Cory Couch (born September 6, 1999) is an American professional football cornerback for the Buffalo Bills of the National Football League (NFL). He played college football for the Miami Hurricanes.

== Early life ==
Couch attended Chaminade-Madonna Prep in Hollywood, Florida. In his final game with Chaminade-Madonna, he recorded two interceptions to lead his team to win its second consecutive 3A state title. He was rated as a four-star recruit and initially committed to Tennessee, before flipping to Michigan and again to Miami to play college football.

== College career ==
Couch played at Miami from 2019 to 2023. He played in all 13 games as a true freshman and totaled eight tackles. As a sophomore, he was used as the third cornerback, behind Al Blades Jr. and D. J. Ivey. He was also used as a hybrid, playing both cornerback and safety. During his college career, he had 156 tackles and four interceptions in 32 career starts for the Hurricanes. He declared for the 2024 NFL draft.

== Professional career ==
Pre-draft measurables
Height	Weight	Arm length	Hand span	Wingspan	40-yard dash	10-yard split	20-yard split	20-yard shuttle	Three-cone drill	Vertical jump	Broad jump
5 ft 10 1/8 in (1.78 m)	185 lb (84 kg)	31 1/8 in (0.79 m)	8 1/2 in (0.22 m)	6 ft 3 in (1.91 m)	4.51 s	1.56 s	2.56 s	4.59 s	7.14 s	33.0 in (0.84 m)	10 ft 4 in (3.15 m)
All values from Pro Day

Couch signed with the Buffalo Bills as an undrafted free agent on May 9, 2024. He played in the preseason, totaling twelve tackles, one tackle-for-loss, one sack, and one pass breakup during three games. He was waived by the Bills on August 27 after the preseason ended and was signed to the practice squad the next day. After the end of the 2024 season, the Bills signed Couch and eight other players to reserve/future contracts.

During the 2025 preseason, Couch suffered a hamstring injury in a joint practice with the Chicago Bears. He was waived the following day and agreed to an injury settlement on August 27. On November 5, the Bills signed Couch and Kingsley Jonathan to the practice squad. On January 19, 2026, he signed a reserve/futures contract with Buffalo.

On August 30, 2026, Couch was waived by the Bills as a part of final roster cuts; he was re-signed to Buffalo's practice squad the next day. He was promoted to the active roster on October 31. He was waived on November 14 and re-signed to the practice squad three days later.
