= Brandon Codrington =

American football player (born 2000)

No. 40 – San Francisco 49ers
- Positions: Cornerback, return specialist
- Roster status: Practice squad

Personal information
- Born: November 17, 2000 (age 25); Raleigh, North Carolina, U.S.
- Listed height: 5 ft 9 in (1.75 m)
- Listed weight: 185 lb (84 kg)

Career information
- High school: Broughton (Raleigh)
- College: North Carolina Central (2019–2023)
- NFL draft: 2024: undrafted

Career history
- New York Jets (2024)*; Buffalo Bills (2024–2025); Houston Texans (2026)*; San Francisco 49ers (2026–present)*
- * Offseason or practice squad member only

Awards and highlights
- PFWA All-Rookie Team (2024); First team All-MEAC (2021); 2× Third team All-MEAC (2019, 2022)

Career NFL statistics as of 2025
- Total tackles: 9
- Pass deflections: 1
- Fumble recoveries: 2
- Return yards: 1,052
- Stats at Pro Football Reference

Brandon Codrington (born November 17, 2000) is an American professional football cornerback and return specialist for the San Francisco 49ers of the National Football League (NFL). He played college football for the North Carolina Central Eagles and was signed by the New York Jets as an undrafted free agent after the 2024 NFL draft.

== Early life ==
Codrington was born on November 17, 2000, in Raleigh, North Carolina. He attended Broughton High School in North Carolina and was used on the football team as a return specialist, totaling 320 kickoff return yards as a senior.

== College career ==
Codrington, who was lightly recruited, walked-on at North Carolina Central University in 2019, as he had several family members who had attended the school. In his first year with the football team, he was mainly used as a return specialist and averaged 18.8 yards per kickoff return and 7.8 yards per punt return. He was the Mid-Eastern Athletic Conference (MEAC) Specialist of the Week after returning a kickoff 75 yards for the game-winning touchdown against Delaware State and ended the season ranked third in the conference in punt return average, being named third-team All-MEAC. He also recorded eight tackles as a defensive back.

Following the 2020 season being canceled due to the COVID-19 pandemic, Codrington started the 2021 season with a game-sealing 77 yard punt return touchdown in the opener against Alcorn State. He was the third-leading punt returner at the NCAA Division I FCS level in the 2021 season, with an average of 15.0 yards that also placed first in the MEAC. Codrington also was second in the MEAC with an average of 22.5 yards per kick return and made 43 tackles and four pass breakups on defense. He was named to Phil Steele's All-MEAC team at four different positions, being a first-team All-MEAC punt returner, third-team All-MEAC kick returner, third-team All-MEAC all-purpose player, and fourth-team All-MEAC defensive back. Codrington also earned selection to the BOXTOROW HBCU All-America team at punt returner and was a one-time MEAC Specialist of the Week during the 2021 season.

Codrington was named third-team All-MEAC at return specialist in 2022, after recording averages of 19.3 yards per kick return and 6.8 yards per punt return. In his senior year, 2023, he averaged 19.6 yards per punt return and 17.9 yards per kick return, scoring two punt return touchdowns. He finished his collegiate career having started 41 games, totaling 93 tackles and 10 pass breakups on defense and 2,148 return yards and four return touchdowns on 130 total returns.

== Professional career ==
Pre-draft measurables
Height	Weight	Arm length	Hand span	Wingspan	40-yard dash	10-yard split	20-yard split	20-yard shuttle	Three-cone drill	Vertical jump	Broad jump	Bench press
5 ft 7 3/4 in (1.72 m)	176 lb (80 kg)	29 5/8 in (0.75 m)	9 1/8 in (0.23 m)	5 ft 11 5/8 in (1.82 m)	4.55 s	1.56 s	2.60 s	4.33 s	7.07 s	35.0 in (0.89 m)	9 ft 8 in (2.95 m)	19 reps
All values from HBCU Combine/Pro Day

=== New York Jets ===
On May 6, 2024, Codrington was signed by the New York Jets as an undrafted free agent. He impressed as a returner in preseason, recording a 63-yard kick return and a 31 yard punt return.

=== Buffalo Bills ===
On August 27, 2024, Codrington was traded to the Buffalo Bills. He logged 619 total return yards on 38 attempts. He was named to the PFWA All-Rookie Team.

On November 15, 2025, Codrington was released by the Bills and re-signed to the practice squad three days later.

=== Houston Texans ===
On February 5, 2026, Codrington signed a reserve/futures contract with the Houston Texans. On August 30, he was waived by the Texans as a part of final roster cuts.

=== San Francisco 49ers ===
On September 1, 2026, Codrington signed with the San Francisco 49ers' practice squad.
