= Ty Johnson (American football) =

American football player (born 1997)

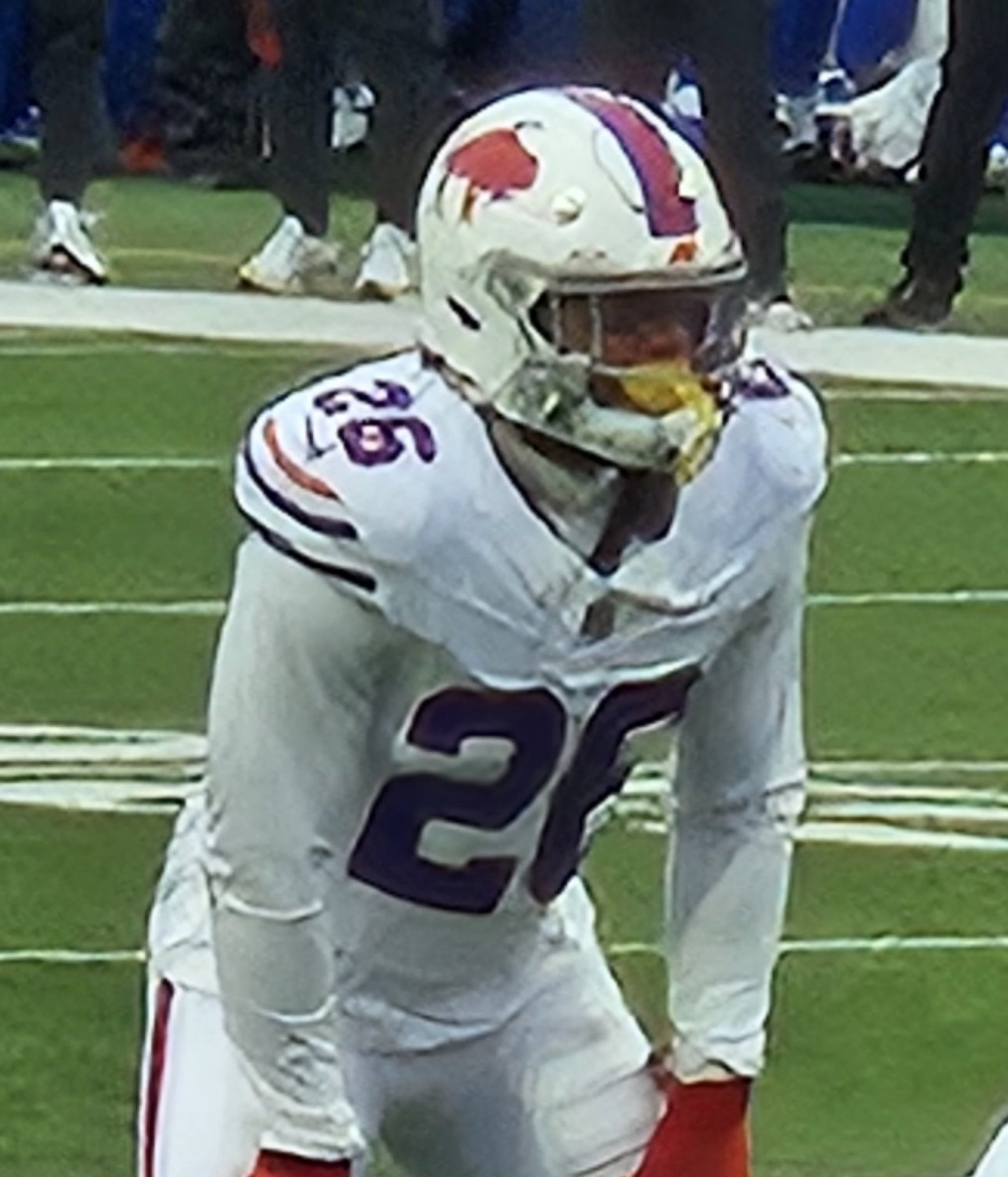
- Johnson with the Buffalo Bills in 2025

No. 26 – Buffalo Bills
- Positions: Running back, kickoff returner
- Roster status: Active

Personal information
- Born: September 17, 1997 (age 29); Cumberland, Maryland, U.S.
- Listed height: 5 ft 10 in (1.78 m)
- Listed weight: 210 lb (95 kg)

Career information
- High school: Fort Hill (Cumberland)
- College: Maryland (2015–2018)
- NFL draft: 2019: 6th round, 186th overall pick

Career history
- Detroit Lions (2019–2020); New York Jets (2020–2022); Buffalo Bills (2023–present)

Career NFL statistics as of Week 11, 2026
- Rushing yards: 1,483
- Rushing average: 4.4
- Rushing touchdowns: 8
- Receptions: 160
- Receiving yards: 1,546
- Receiving touchdowns: 9
- Return yards: 779
- Stats at Pro Football Reference

Ty Marquise Johnson (born September 17, 1997) is an American professional football running back and kickoff returner for the Buffalo Bills of the National Football League (NFL). He played college football for the Maryland Terrapins.

== Early life ==
Johnson grew up in Cumberland, Maryland, and attended Fort Hill High School. Johnson was a multi-year starter at both running back and defensive back. In his junior and senior seasons at Fort Hill in 2013 and 2014, Johnson led the Sentinels to back to back Maryland 1A State Football Championships. After both seasons, Johnson was named Area High School Football Player of the Year by the Cumberland Times-News, and in 2014 was named to the Maryland High School Consensus All-State team by the Maryland High School Football Foundation. Johnson was responsible for nearly 5,000 all-purpose yards and 65 touchdowns during his two full varsity seasons.

== College career ==
Johnson was rated as a three-star college prospect, the 20th best recruit in the state of Maryland, and the 64th best running back prospect in the country by Rivals. Johnson verbally committed to the Maryland Terrapins briefly after being offered a scholarship in June 2014 by then-head coach Randy Edsall at a football camp at Maryland Stadium. Johnson officially signed his letter of intent to attend Maryland in February 2015. While Johnson was recruited by other programs, he did not receive a scholarship offer from a Football Bowl Subdivision (FBS) program other than the Terrapins.

In four seasons with the Terrapins, Johnson tallied 4,196 all-purpose yards, third in program history. In his sophomore season in 2016, Johnson set the Terrapins’ single season yards per carry record, averaging 9.1 yards per rushing attempt. Johnson also starred as a kick returner, finishing his collegiate career with 1,194 kick return yards and two return touchdowns, one going for 100 yards against Ohio State in 2017, and another going for 98 yards against Michigan in 2018. Johnson graduated from Maryland in December 2018.

== Professional career ==
Pre-draft measurables
Height	Weight	Arm length	Hand span	Wingspan	40-yard dash	10-yard split	20-yard split	Vertical jump	Broad jump	Bench press
5 ft 10 3/4 in (1.80 m)	210 lb (95 kg)	30 1/8 in (0.77 m)	9 1/8 in (0.23 m)	5 ft 11 3/4 in (1.82 m)	4.40 s	1.56 s	2.51 s	34.5 in (0.88 m)	10 ft 3 in (3.12 m)	13 reps
All values from Pro Day

Johnson did not receive an invitation to the 2019 NFL Scouting Combine. However, at Maryland's football pro day, scouts from 29 NFL teams, plus scouts from two Arena Football League teams, one team each from the Austrian Football League, German Football League and one Canadian Football League team were present to observe the workouts of 15 Maryland players, including Johnson. Johnson impressed scouts by running a 40-yard dash time clocked by most scouts as anywhere between 4.3 and 4.4 seconds, with one scout reportedly timing Johnson as fast as 4.26 seconds. For comparison, the fastest 40-yard dash time ran by any running back at the 2019 NFL Scouting Combine was 4.40 seconds by Justice Hill of the Oklahoma State Cowboys. At his pro day workout, Johnson was also able to do 27 repetitions of the bench press at 225 pounds, which would have ranked the highest among 2019 Combine running backs, and was recorded jumping a 34-inch vertical.

=== Detroit Lions ===
Johnson was selected by the Detroit Lions in the sixth round (186th overall) of the 2019 NFL draft. Johnson made his NFL debut in the Lions' regular season opener against the Arizona Cardinals and had a six-yard carry in the 27–27 tie. Johnson made his first career start in Week 10 against the Chicago Bears and had five carries for 16 rushing yards. Overall, in his rookie season, Johnson had 63 carries for 273 rushing yards and 24 receptions for 109 receiving yards.

On October 1, 2020, Johnson was waived by the Lions.

=== New York Jets ===
On October 2, 2020, Johnson was claimed off waivers by the New York Jets.

In Week 13 against the Las Vegas Raiders, Johnson rushed 22 times for 104 yards and a touchdown during the 31–28 loss. Two weeks later, the Jets secured their first win on the season against the Los Angeles Rams. Johnson rushed for 16 yards on three carries, added six receptions for 39 yards, and scored the Jets' first touchdown on an 18-yard completion from quarterback Sam Darnold.

Johnson was re-signed on March 28, 2023. Shortly thereafter, Johnson suffered a torn pec during an offseason workout. He was released by the Jets with a non-football injury designation on April 26.

=== Buffalo Bills ===
On August 21, 2023, Johnson signed with the Buffalo Bills. He was waived on August 29, and re-signed to the practice squad. Johnson was promoted to the active roster on October 20.

Johnson remained on the Bills active roster through the end of the 2023 regular season and into the postseason. He finished the regular season with 194 all-purpose yards and a receiving touchdown, which he scored in Week 11 against the New York Jets. In the Bills' two postseason games following the 2023 season, including a victory against the Pittsburgh Steelers in the wild card round and a loss to the Kansas City Chiefs in the divisional round, Johnson rushed 15 times for 66 yards, which put him over 1,000 total rushing yards for his career.

Johnson re-signed with the Bills on March 19, 2024. He played in all 17 games for Buffalo in 2024, including one start, and recorded 41 carries for 213 yards and 18 receptions for 284 yards, along with 4 total touchdowns.

On March 11, 2025, Johnson re-signed with Buffalo on a two-year, $5 million contract. He finished the 2025 season with 50 carries for 200 yards and three touchdowns to go with 24 receptions for 263 yards and two touchdowns.

== Career statistics ==
Legend
**Bold**	Career high

=== Regular season ===
Year	Team	Games		Rushing					Receiving					Fumbles	
Year	Team	GP	GS	Att	Yds	Avg	Lng	TD	Rec	Yds	Avg	Lng	TD	Fum	Lost
2019	DET	16	1	**63**	**273**	4.3	**40**	0	24	109	4.5	13	0	1	**1**
2020	DET	2	0	0	0	—	0	0	0	0	—	0	0	0	0
2020	NYJ	11	1	54	254	4.7	34	1	16	99	6.2	18	1	0	0
2021	NYJ	16	3	61	238	3.9	24	2	**34**	**372**	10.9	23	2	**2**	**1**
2022	NYJ	17	1	30	160	**5.3**	32	1	12	88	7.3	16	0	0	0
2023	BUF	10	0	30	132	4.4	13	0	7	62	8.9	28	1	1	0
2024	BUF	17	1	41	213	5.2	19	1	18	284	**15.8**	41	**3**	0	0
2025	BUF	17	0	50	200	4.0	23	**3**	24	263	11.0	**52**	2	1	0
2026	BUF	8	0	8	13	1.6	3	0	25	269	10.8	40	0	0	0
Career		114	7	337	1,483	4.4	40	8	160	1,546	9.7	52	9	5	2

=== Postseason ===
Year	Team	Games		Rushing					Receiving					Fumbles	
Year	Team	GP	GS	Att	Yds	Avg	Lng	TD	Rec	Yds	Avg	Lng	TD	Fum	Lost
2023	BUF	2	0	15	66	4.4	15	0	1	14	**14.0**	14	0	0	0
2024	BUF	3	1	**20**	**94**	**4.7**	**17**	0	**4**	**34**	8.5	**24**	**1**	0	0
2025	BUF	0	0	Did not play due to injury											
Career		5	1	35	160	4.6	17	0	5	48	9.6	24	1	0	0
