= Pegula =

Pegula may refer to:

== People ==
- Jessica Pegula (born 1994), American tennis player and billionaire heiress
- Kim Pegula (born 1969), American businesswoman
- Terry Pegula (born 1951), American billionaire

== Other ==
- Pegula Ice Arena, multi-purpose arena in University Park, Pennsylvania
- Pegula Sports and Entertainment, American holding company
