= Pegula Sports & Entertainment =

Former American sports and venue management company

Pegula Sports & Entertainment, LLC.
- Type: Private
- Industry: Professional sports, property management, entertainment
- Founded: 2011
- Founders: Terry Pegula; Kim Pegula
- Defunct: 2023 (dissolved)
- Headquarters: Buffalo, New York, United States
- Area served: Western New York
- Products: Professional sports teams, sports venues, sports channels, music, restaurants
- Subsidiaries: Hockey Western New York LLC (Buffalo Sabres, Buffalo Bandits, Rochester Americans); Buffalo Bills; Rochester Knighthawks; LECOM Harborcenter; Black River Entertainment; MSG Western New York; Highmark Stadium; KeyBank Center; Blue Cross Arena
- Website: Official Site

Pegula Sports & Entertainment (PSE) was an American sports and entertainment company based in Buffalo, New York. The company was established after billionaire Terry Pegula combined his sports, property and entertainment assets into one company. The company's assets included the Buffalo Bills of the National Football League, the Buffalo Sabres of the National Hockey League, the Buffalo Bandits and the Rochester Knighthawks of the National Lacrosse League, and the Rochester Americans of the American Hockey League. The company was operated by Kim Pegula, Terry's wife, as president and CEO.

On August 28, 2023, Pegula Sports and Entertainment was dissolved, with the Bills and Sabres to be operated as "separate organizations" according to Terry Pegula. Pegula will remain owner and president of both franchises. A series of transactions in 2024, tied to Kim Pegula's incapacitation, led to her stake in the Bills being placed into an estate controlled by Terry Pegula and Bob Long, a small portion being sold to Terry's daughter Laura Pegula, and further portions sold to private equity firm Arctos Partners, a coalition of private equity and banking executives, and Toronto athletes Vince Carter, Tracy McGrady and Jozy Altidore. Terry Pegula's other sports assets remain fully under his ownership.

== Properties ==
=== Sports teams ===
In 2011, following the liquidation of assets from his East Resources natural gas company, Pegula purchased the Buffalo Sabres and the Buffalo Bandits from former owners Tom Golisano and Larry Quinn taking control of their holding company Hockey Western New York, LLC for $189 million. On May 17, 2011, Pegula purchased the Rochester Americans of the American Hockey League from the Rochester Sports Group that had previously owned the team and reaffiliated the Americans with the Sabres on June 24 of that year. Pegula purchased the Americans for US$5 million.

In 2014, Terry and Kim Pegula placed the winning bid to purchase the Buffalo Bills, beating out a stalking-horse bid from Donald Trump and a bid led by Jon Bon Jovi backed by owners of Maple Leaf Sports & Entertainment. The $1.4 billion, all-cash purchase was the highest price in NFL history to that point. The Bills had come up for sale earlier in the year after the team's founding owner, Ralph Wilson, died.

Pegula Sports & Entertainment acquired the Buffalo Beauts of the National Women's Hockey League in December 2017. While not the first or only NHL owner to partner with an NWHL team (the New Jersey Devils and later the Minnesota Wild also had affiliation agreements), the Pegulas' purchase of the Beauts was the first time any outside investor had purchased a team in what is otherwise a single-entity league; all the other teams are centrally owned and operated. The team was returned to the league in 2019 with Kim Pegula quoted as saying “Our main goal has always been fostering the growth of women’s hockey across all ages.” “We thank our Beauts players, staff, and fans for their support this past season. We will continue to look for ways to successfully grow the women’s game.”

In 2018, Pegula Sports & Entertainment reached an agreement to purchase the intellectual property of the Rochester Knighthawks of the National Lacrosse League in autumn 2019. Rochester Sports Group owner Curt Styres orchestrated the sale as he planned on moving his staff and roster to a new Halifax NLL team set to debut in the winter of 2020; the NLL does not have restrictions on ownership groups owning multiple teams (as it is, the Bandits are owned primarily by Terry, while Kim, who grew up in Rochester, would have a larger role in operations over the Knighthawks). In 2025, Pegula divested the Knighthawks to the Seneca Nation of Indians.

=== Media ===
Pegula Sports and Entertainment operated Black River Entertainment, an independent country music label. The label features such acts as Kelsea Ballerini and Craig Morgan as well as the related Black River Publishing and Sound Stage Studio all under the Black River label based in Nashville, Tennessee.

The company had control over the Western New York subchannel of the regional sports network MSG known as MSG Western New York which is on occasion also credited as Pegula Sports Network. The channel broadcasts all regional Buffalo Sabres games and Sabres content as well as Buffalo Bills content, local Buffalo radio sports show simulcasts, select Rochester Americans games, and high school football along with special programming. The channel replaced the main MSG channel in 2016 on all cable systems across Western New York.

PSE also owned PicSix Creative which serves as the company's in-house marketing, design, production and communications services firm. PicSix also accepts work from outside clients.

=== Real estate ===
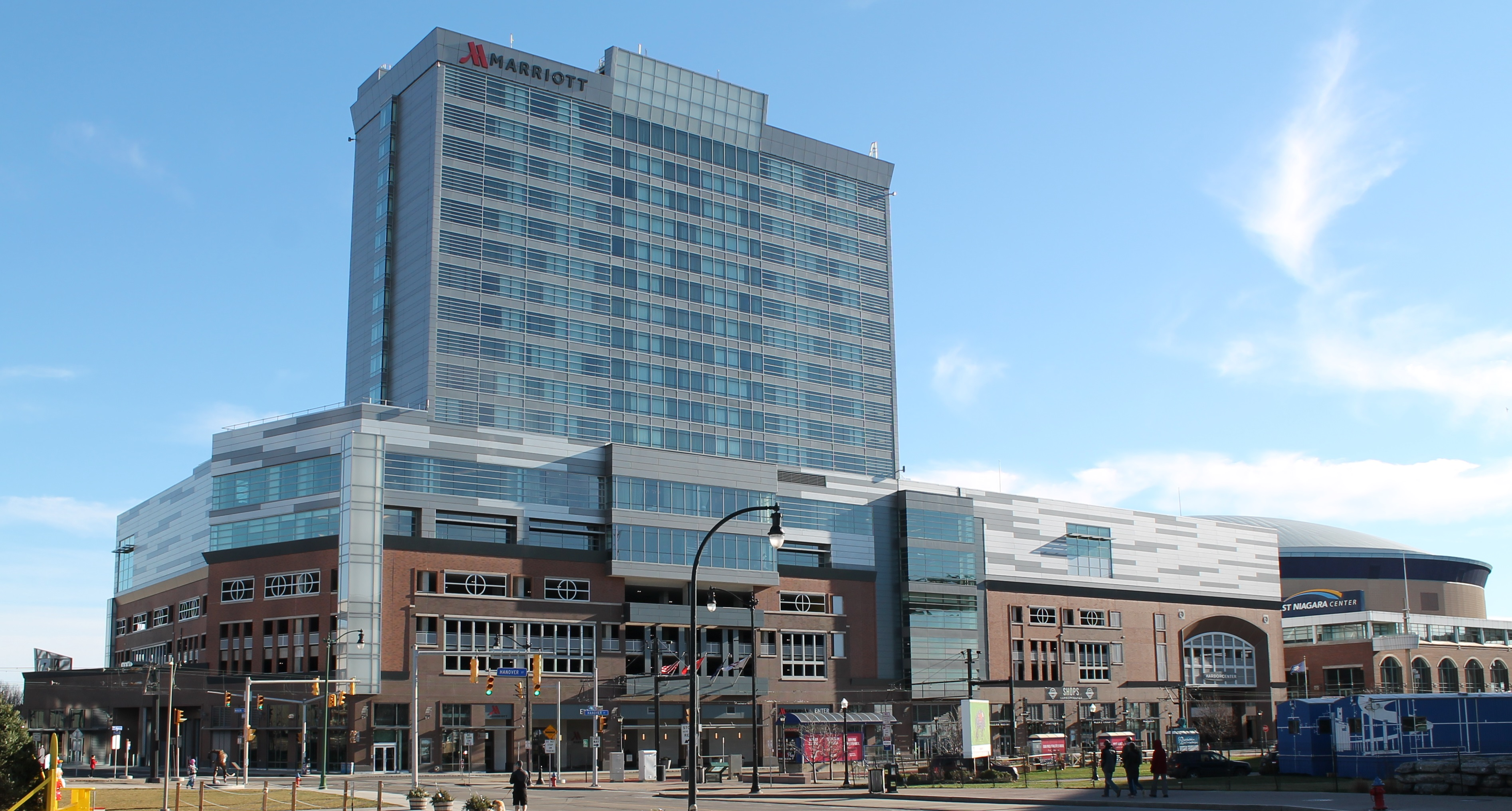
LECOM Harborcenter was built by the Pegulas and opened in 2014

The company was the owner and operator of LECOM Harborcenter, a $250 million hockey-themed building, which is anchored by the two rinks, a large parking garage, retail, and restaurants including a Sabres themed Tim Hortons and a Marriott hotel. The building mostly opened in November 2014 with the rinks, restaurants and parking garage was fully completed and fully opened in August 2015 with the completion and opening of the hotel and retail. On September 10, 2019, Pegula Sports and Entertainment reached a 10-year naming rights agreement for the building with Lake Erie College of Osteopathic Medicine (LECOM).

The company was also the arena manager of KeyBank Center which is connected to LECOM Harborcenter. Since taking over management PSE has made many arena upgrades. After the 2011–12 Buffalo Sabres season, 380 seats were added to the arena, mainly as an additional row in the 200 level, to raise the arena's capacity to 19,070. This number is symbolic of the founding of the Sabres in 1970. In 2013, it was announced that all 80 luxury suites would be renovated over a three-year period. All suites now feature the Sabres blue and gold color scheme, 50" televisions, new carpeting, new furniture and gathering islands. Construction began on this project in July 2013. In 2016, a new LED lighting system was installed and allowed the arena to provide better lighting while significantly reducing the number of light fixtures needed and reducing energy consumption.

As part of the company's purchase of the Buffalo Bills, the team took over as a manager of the team's Orchard Park stadium. Pegula overturned a longstanding policy of predecessor Ralph Wilson's and sold the naming rights to the stadium to New Era Cap Company, naming the stadium New Era Field. After New Era ended the agreement early, Pegula signed a new naming rights deal with Highmark Blue Cross Blue Shield of Western New York and the stadium became Highmark Stadium. Pegula also brought stadium rock concerts back to the stadium after over a decade of absence.

On March 28, 2022, It was announced that a deal had been reached between New York State, Erie County and the Pegulas for a 62,000 seat, $1.4 Billion dollar new stadium for the Bills in Orchard Park across the street from the current stadium. New York State will contribute $600 million in funding with Erie County contributing $250 million, the Pegulas contributing $350 million and the National football league via a G-4 loan $200 million. In addition the Pegulas signed the Bills to a 30-year iron clad lease. The stadium would be owned by New York State, a change from the current stadium which is owned by Erie County and operated by PSE.

On April 25, 2017, it was announced that Labatt USA and PSE had partnered on a project to develop the Pegula owned 79 Perry Street in the Cobblestone district in Buffalo into a mixed use facility to include a small test brewery called the "Labatt House", a restaurant called "The Draft Room" as well as retail, commercial and residential space. Labatt relocated its U.S. headquarters from Fountain Plaza to the building's second floor and PSE moved its headquarters to the building's third and fourth floor. The restaurant, brew house and Labatt USA headquarters opened in November 2018, with the rest of the building completed in 2019. Bakery 55, a Pegula-owned baked goods provider, opened in the Labatt building in December 2018.

On June 13, 2017, it was reported that the Pegulas had purchased a building at 118 Michigan Ave across from the Seneca Buffalo Creek Casino.

On July 13, 2018, it was announced that the Pegulas had taken over the management of the AHL Americans arena Blue Cross Arena in Rochester from former operator SMG. Soon after the purchase, PSE was criticized for monopolizing Blue Cross Arena for its own teams and evicting other events from the arena by raising the price of rent to a level most other entities could not or were not willing to pay.

The company also owned Deer Valley Trails in the Adirondack Mountains town of St. Regis Falls, New York and Terra Mare, a restaurant in Fort Lauderdale, Florida. The company holds a marketing partnership with Sear, a Buffalo steakhouse co-owned by Bills alumni Fred Jackson, Terrence McGee and Brian Moorman.

=== Brands ===
Also under the Pegula umbrella is IMPACT Performance Cycle & Yoga, two high performance athletic training facilities which are based in Boca Raton, Florida and LECOM Harborcenter in Buffalo. The Pegulas own retail merchandiser ADPRO Sports which was acquired from former majority owner Ron Raccuia on August 21, 2017. In addition PSE operates a restaurant in HarborCenter called Healthy Scratch, a brand owned and operated by the Pegulas' daughters, Kelly and Jessica Pegula, Jessica notably also being an internationally ranked tennis player.

The company also controlled and managed the brand One Buffalo, a brand created by Kim Pegula after the 2014 purchase of the Buffalo Bills by the Pegulas. Through a partnership with Southern Tier Brewing Company, PSE launched a "One Buffalo" branded craft beer that sells at all Pegula-owned properties and elsewhere in the region. The One Buffalo brand has also been extended to a flavor of Perry's Ice Cream and premium cupcakes, both formulated by Kim Pegula, a pronounced fan of desserts.

The company formerly owned 716 Food and Sport, a two floor sports themed restaurant which serves as the main business tenant of Harborcenter. In 2021, the Pegulas sold the restaurant to Southern Tier Brewing Company.

== Personnel ==
Russ Brandon served as the organization's President from shortly after the company's acquisition of the Bills until his resignation in May 2018. This was followed by the departure of several other high-ranking executives over the course of the next year; Michael Gilbert and Nik Fattey left in December 2018, and Bruce Popko (chief operating officer, who after Brandon's departure was the highest ranking person in the organization who was not a member of the Pegula family), Brent Rossi (chief administrative officer who had replaced Gilbert), and Erica Muehlman (a senior vice president) were all fired in February 2019, with Kim Pegula indicating none of the positions would initially be replaced.

In April 2020, during the COVID-19 pandemic in New York (state), an article from The Athletic by Tim Graham detailed and criticized PSE's termination of numerous employees in what was seen as a cost-saving measure, and also described "low morale" and a "toxic culture" within the Sabres and across the whole organization.

In 2026, after the formal dissolution of PSE, the Bills and Sabres continue to share key executive personnel, including chief operating officer Pete Guelli.
