= Southern Tier Brewing Company =

American craft brewery based in Lakewood, NY

- Industry: Alcoholic beverage
- Founded: 2002
- Founders: Phineas DeMink and Allen "Skip" Yahn
- Headquarters: Lakewood, NY, USA
- Products: Beer
- Production output: 100,000 barrels
- Website: www.stbcbeer.com

Southern Tier Brewing Company is a craft brewing company in Lakewood, NY, in the southwestern section of NY state known as the Southern Tier.

== History ==
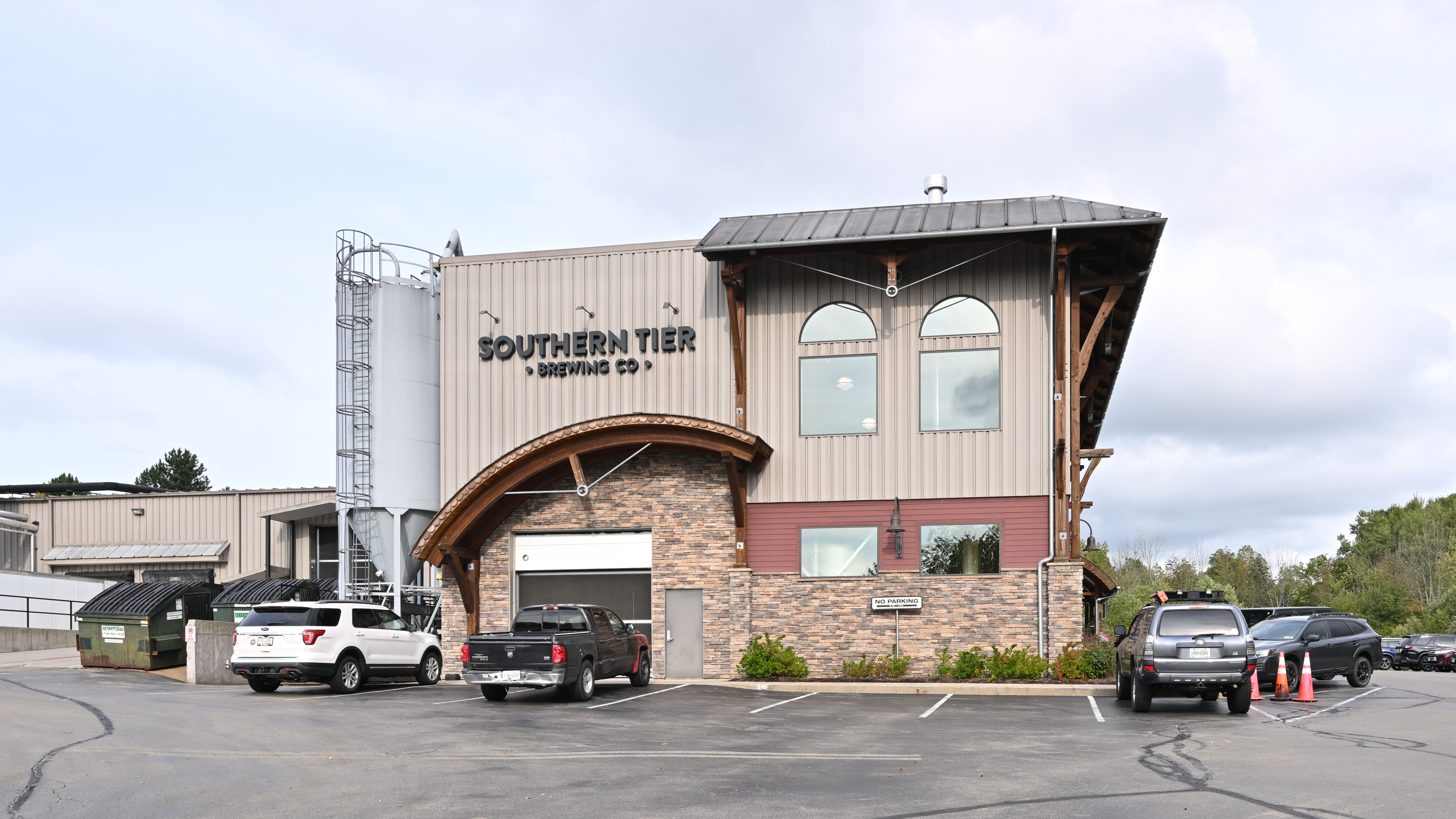
Southern Tier brewery building, Lakewood, NY

The company was founded in 2001 by Phineas DeMink and Allen "Skip" Yahn. They purchased old equipment from the Old Saddleback Brewing Co. in Pittsfield, Massachusetts. By 2003, the brewery had expanded to multiple varieties of small batch ales distributed locally. By 2005, the company had expanded its distribution to cover the majority of New York State and Pennsylvania. In 2009, a new 20,000-sq-ft building was built to accommodate the company's expansion nationally and internationally.

In 2010, 800 barrels of fermentation vessels were built, as well as a 7,500 square-foot addition to the conditioning room. The brew house expanded from 20 BBL to a 50 BBL system. The company also added a new bottling line that fills, caps and labels over 10,000 bottles per hour at full speed. They also added a cellar to add another 7,200 BBL of fermentation space.

In 2012, a new brewhouse installation began of a 110-barrel Steinecker brewhouse imported from Germany. A new tasting room was installed as the ending point of Saturday afternoon tours with 14 draught lines. In 2013, a 45,000 sq. ft. warehouse, wastewater treatment facility, and distribution center were built.

On February 16, 2016, Southern Tier allied with Victory Brewing Company to become part of the Artisanal Brewing Ventures holding company.

In January 2017, Southern Tier opened its first satellite brewpub in Pittsburgh, Pennsylvania with thirty different beers on tap.

In September 2018, its second satellite location opened in Cleveland, Ohio with 30+ draft offerings.

In March 2021, Southern Tier acquired the restaurant 716 Food and Sport at LECOM Harborcenter in Buffalo from Pegula Sports and Entertainment.

Additionally, Southern Tier opened a fifth location in Charlotte, North Carolina, which is a section of Brewers at 4001 Yancey.

== Brews ==
=== Year-round standard ===
- IPA – triple hopped intrepid ale
- 2x IPA – double IPA
- Live – a citrusy session pale ale
- Tangier – a session pale ale brewed with tangerine peels
- Right-O-Way IPA – a session India pale ale
- One Buffalo – brewed with Willamette hops and centennial hops and 2-row malt, oats, and wheat. Developed under the tutelage of Terry and Kim Pegula for their sports and entertainment properties.
- Porter – brewed with 2 varieties of hops & 5 types of malts
- Phin & Matts – brewed with 3 varieties of hops & 3 types of malts
- 2x Stout – a milk stout
- Pilsner – traditional Pilsner malt bill complemented by German Lager yeast and German noble hops

=== Year-round imperials ===
- Cherry Gose – an imperial sour ale with NY tart cherries
- Unearthly IPA – a "vigorously" hopped beer
- Gemini – A hopped beer smoothed out with malts

=== Seasonal imperials ===
- Krampus – a Helles lager with extra malt. Seasonal November release
- Pumking – Classic pumpkin ale with 8.6 ABV. Seasonal release starting in mid-July
- Back Burner – An old English style barley wine
- 3 Citrus Peel Out – wheat ale brewed with orange, grapefruit, and tangerine peels
- Warlock - Imperial Pumpkin Stout. 8.6 ABV. Pumpkin pie laced with coffee and dark chocolate.

=== Other seasonal brews ===
- Harvest – Autumn ale
- Old Man – Winter ale

== See also ==
- Beer in the United States
