= AELP =

AELP may refer to:

== Organizations ==
- American Economic Liberties Project, a pro-antitrust organization in the United States
- Association of Employment and Learning Providers, a trade association for vocational learning and employment providers in the United Kingdom

== Businesses ==
- American Energy Partners, LP, a defunct natural gas and oil company based in the US
