= Russ Brandon =

American sports executive

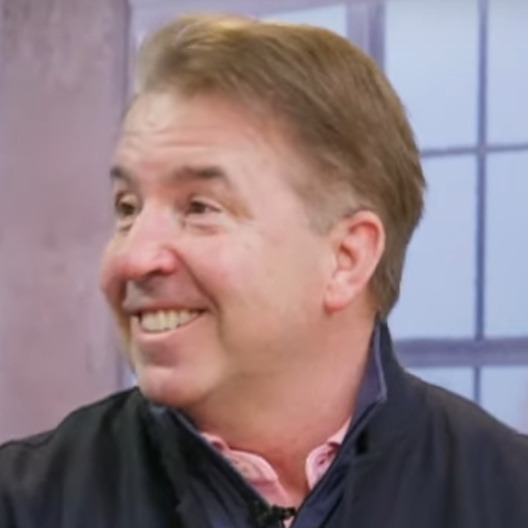
- Brandon in a 2024 interview with Front Office Sports

1st President of the UFL
- Incumbent
- Assumed office December 31, 2023

Personal details
- Born: June 1967 (age 59) East Syracuse, New York, U.S.
- Education: Saint John Fisher College
- Occupation: UFL CEO & President of League and Football Operations

Russell Jerome Brandon (born June 1967) is an American sports executive, and current CEO and President of the United Football League (UFL). Brandon is best known for his 21-year tenure in the front office of the Buffalo Bills of the National Football League.

== Career ==
=== Early career ===
Brandon is a 1989 alumnus of Saint John Fisher College. In 1990, Brandon began his career with the Rochester Red Wings, then the Triple-A affiliate of the Baltimore Orioles, where he was a member of a staff that included Joe Altobelli, Glenn Geffner, Joe Kehoskie, Josh Lewin, and Bob Socci. Brandon had risen to co-general manager of the team by the time he left in 1993.

After a brief stint with a New York Yankees division called Sports Advertising Network, he eventually joined the front office of the Florida Marlins and was there as part of the 1997 World Series championship team.

=== Buffalo Bills ===
Six days after the Marlins won the World Series, Brandon joined the Buffalo Bills of the National Football League on November 1, 1997. Brandon was first named to a high-level executive position within the franchise in 2006, being named director of non-football operations alongside general manager Marv Levy. Brandon, although his title did not change, assumed Levy's responsibilities as de facto general manager after Levy retired. Brandon was promoted to CEO upon the hiring of Buddy Nix as the Bills' general manager. Among other things, he is credited with expanding the Buffalo Bills fan base throughout the Western New York-Southern Ontario region in a time when the team's on-field fortunes were poor (Brandon was with the team throughout its 17-year playoff drought), and was instrumental in the deal for the Bills to play two games per season (one preseason, one regular season) in Toronto, Canada. An influential NFL executive, Brandon also served on several league business and marketing committees. As CEO, Brandon increased his influence on the team and handled most of its day-to-day operations while owner Ralph Wilson's health began to decline. This culminated in Wilson officially naming Brandon as president on January 1, 2013, giving Brandon full control over the franchise. Brandon is the third person to serve as president of the Bills, after Wilson and Tom Donahoe. Since Wilson's retirement, Brandon had served as the team's representative in owners' meetings in lieu of Wilson, a position he continued even as his widow inherited the trust that held ownership of the team.

=== Buffalo Sabres ===
Shortly after Terrence Pegula purchased the Bills, Brandon was also assigned the role of president of the Buffalo Sabres of the National Hockey League following the dismissal of previous president Ted Black on July 27, 2015. With his assumption of the Sabres role, Brandon also became president of the Rochester Americans of the American Hockey League. The change also changed Brandon's title with the Bills to that of "managing partner," but despite the title change, Brandon did not receive a partnership stake in the franchise (unlike predecessor Larry Quinn, who owned a share of the Sabres during his time as managing partner).

=== Resignation ===
Brandon announced his resignation from Pegula Sports and Entertainment on May 1, 2018. In a statement to the press, Brandon stated that the departure had been planned since he had reached 20 years with the Bills franchise in November 2017 and that he fulfilled his duties to the Bills and Sabres for the remainder of the season before tendering his resignation. A report in The Buffalo News claimed that Brandon had been subject to an internal investigation regarding inappropriate relationships with female employees; neither the Bills nor Brandon mentioned such in their statements. Pegula's wife Kim, already active in the Bills' operations as a part owner, took over Brandon's positions.

=== XFL/UFL ===
Following his departure from the Bills, Brandon took a position with RedBird Capital Partners. On November 8, 2021, following RedBird's purchase of a majority stake in the XFL, Russ Brandon was named president of league and its football operations, succeeding the departing Jeffrey Pollack. In July 2023, he also assumed the role of CEO for the league. Brandon became the President of the United Football League (UFL) when the XFL and USFL merged on December 31, 2023. He was reassigned to a position of executive vice president of football operations in November 2025 upon the arrival of Mike Repole.

== Filmography ==
- Draft Day (2014) (as himself)

== Personal life ==
Brandon is from East Syracuse, New York, the son of Russell E. Brandon Jr. and Lydia Raflowski. His brother Gregg Brandon was the executive vice president and general counsel for Pegula Sports and Entertainment. He is married to Amy Brandon.
