= Highmark Stadium =

Stadium in Orchard Park, New York

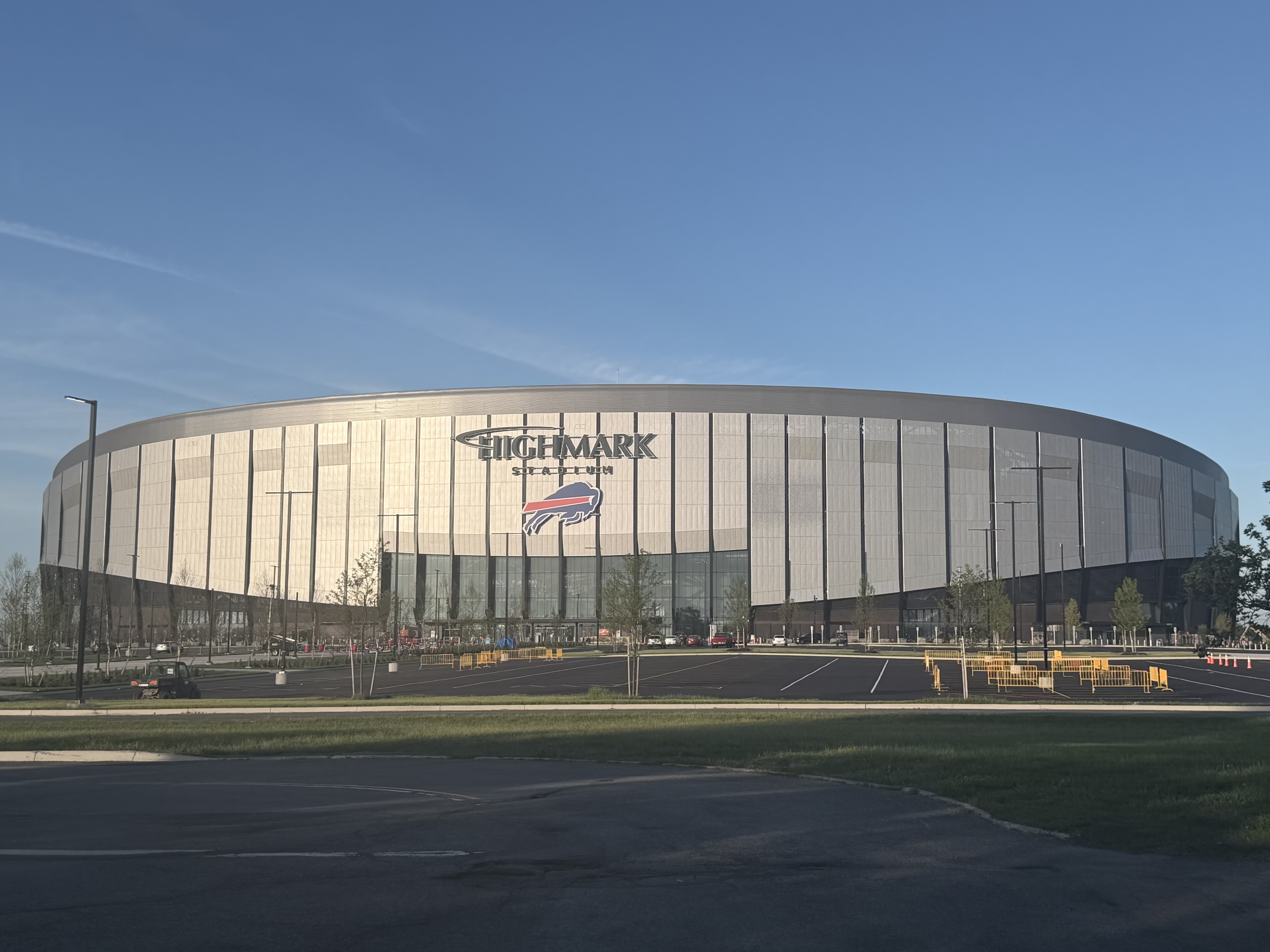
- Highmark Stadium in 2026
- Interactive map of Highmark Stadium
- Full name: Highmark BlueCross BlueShield Stadium
- Former names: New Highmark Stadium (construction phase)
- Address: 10 Bills Plaza
- Location: Orchard Park, New York, U.S.
- Coordinates: 42°46′23″N 78°47′32″W
- Elevation: 770 ft (235 m) AMSL
- Owner: State of New York
- Operator: Legends Hospitality
- Capacity: 63,000 (60,108 seats + 2,892 standing room)
- Surface: Kentucky bluegrass

Construction
- Groundbreaking: June 5, 2023
- Opened: June 23, 2026; 4 months ago
- Cost: $2.2 billion
- Architect: Populous
- Structural engineer: Walter P Moore

Tenant
- Buffalo Bills (NFL) (2026–present)

Website
- www.thehighmarkstadium.com

Highmark Stadium (also referred to as New Highmark Stadium and colloquially as The Pit) is an American football stadium located in Orchard Park, New York, a suburb of Buffalo. It opened in 2026, serving as the home field of the Buffalo Bills of the National Football League (NFL).

The stadium was built adjacent to Erie Community College's south campus across the street from where Ralph Wilson Stadium stood. The stadium was designed by Populous. The stadium has a seating capacity of 60,108, the smallest among NFL venues. However, the 63,000 total capacity (counting standing room-only possibilities) can reach 66,000 depending on the event. The new venue has a partial roof so that 65% of seats would be protected from the elements; the playing field is uncovered as Buffalo's reputation for cold, snowy weather often makes for compelling television and has long formed a part of the team's and city's identity.

The stadium cost $1.7 billion. Under an agreement with the state of New York, taxpayers paid $850 million of the construction cost (with $600 million coming from New York State and $250 million coming from Erie County). With the State of New York paying for all maintenance and repair costs, it is the largest taxpayer contribution ever for an NFL facility.

Groundbreaking began in June 2023, and the stadium opened on June 23, 2026. The Bills announced an extension to its existing stadium naming rights deal with Highmark Blue Cross Blue Shield.

== Design ==
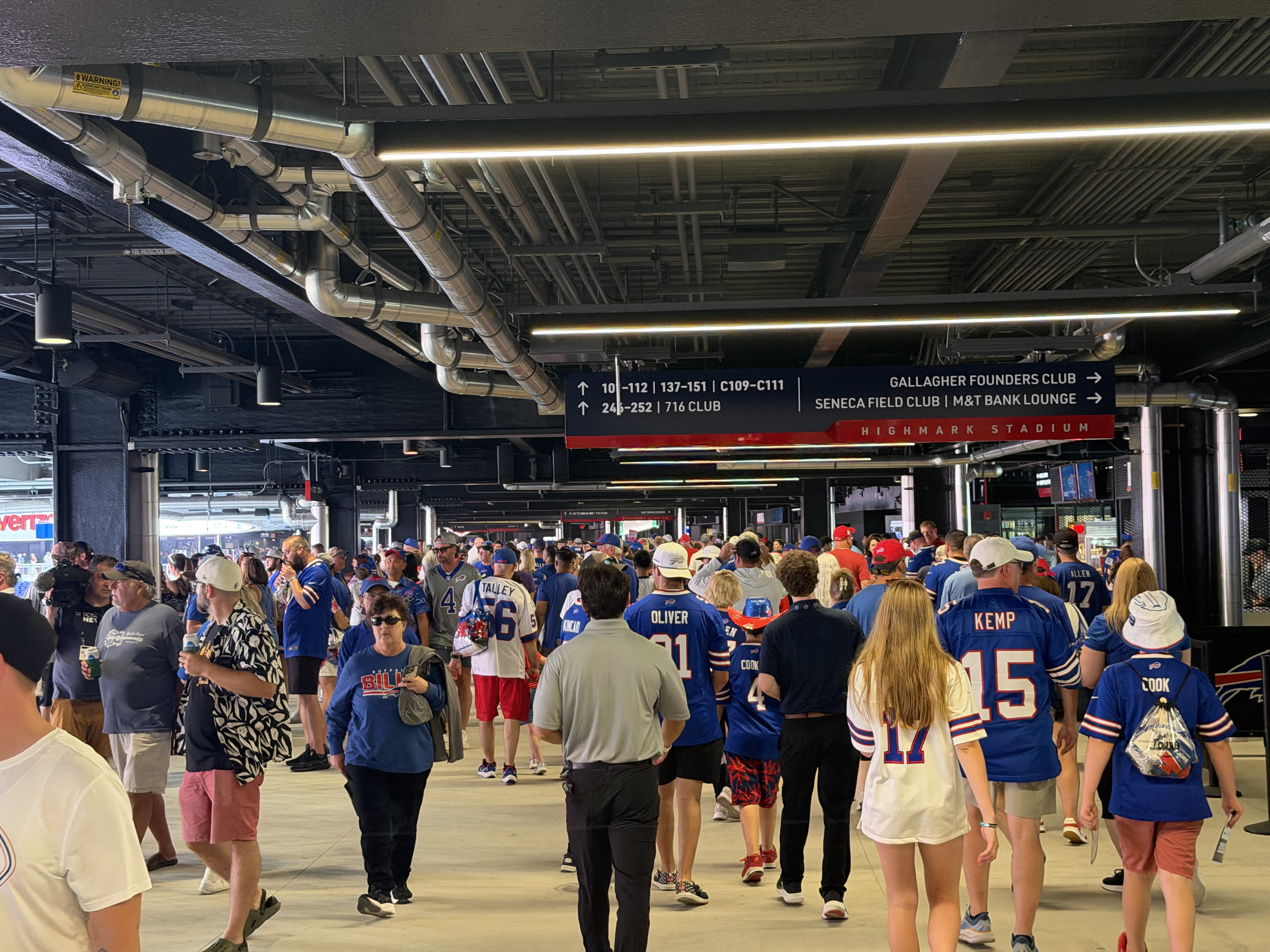
Concourse of Highmark Stadium

Highmark Stadium was designed by the architecture firm Populous in collaboration with the Buffalo Bills and Legends. The design was conceived as a football-focused, open-air stadium intended to preserve the effects of Buffalo's weather while providing greater protection for spectators than the team's previous stadium. Populous said that the design drew on Buffalo's architectural heritage and sought to create an intimate seating environment that emphasized the relationship between spectators and the field.

The exterior is characterized by a continuous colonnade of vertical fins extending around the stadium from ground level to the canopy. Perforated metal panels are positioned between the upper portions of the fins, providing protection from wind and precipitation while retaining the open-air character of the venue. The lower portion of the exterior uses iron-spot brick, while large openings at the north end zone and corners provide entrances into the stadium. The building's curved forms and rounded corners were intended to combine references to Buffalo's historic architecture with a more contemporary appearance. At the northeast entrance, the Family Circle plaza includes a sculpture depicting a family of American bison and serves as a gathering space for spectators and the wider community.

A 360-degree canopy covers the seating bowl. Rather than enclosing the stadium, the canopy follows the shape of the bowl and exterior facade, rising toward the center of the stadium and descending toward the end zones. The arrangement provides weather protection while leaving the field exposed to outdoor conditions. The canopy and surrounding facade were also designed to mitigate the effects of Buffalo's wind and winter weather without eliminating the outdoor environment associated with Bills games. Contemporary descriptions of the completed stadium report that the canopy covers more than 60 percent of the seating.

The seating bowl was designed with relatively steep, stacked seating to bring spectators closer to the field. Populous described the arrangement as being intended to create an intimate and intimidating environment and to enhance the visual continuity of the crowd. In particular, seating above the north end zone places spectators as close as 12 feet vertically from the field. The configuration was intended to improve the sense of proximity to the game and contribute to the stadium's home-field atmosphere.

The stadium's interior circulation is organized around 360-degree concourses, allowing spectators to move around the building while retaining views toward the field in many areas. The open concourse design represents a change from the more enclosed circulation areas of the previous stadium. The Bills and Populous also incorporated premium clubs, gathering spaces and other hospitality areas into the building, while maintaining the emphasis on football and spectator proximity. After the stadium's first large public events in 2026, observers noted the openness of the concourses and the improved sense of closeness to the field compared with the previous venue.

Weather considerations were incorporated into both the architecture and stadium systems. The open-air configuration allows snow, wind and cold temperatures to remain part of the game-day environment, while the canopy, perforated facade, enclosed circulation areas and snow-mitigation systems provide protection for spectators and the playing surface. The stadium uses a natural-grass field with an underground heating and snow-melting system. The resulting design was intended to balance the demands of Buffalo's winter climate with the Bills' preference for an outdoor football environment.

== History ==
=== Planning and approval ===
The Buffalo Bills' lease included a provision allowing for the creation of a working group to explore options for either a new stadium for the team, or an extensive retrofit of the older Highmark Stadium.

The first major stadium proposal was presented in 2012. On October 23, George Hasiotis and Nicholas Stracick of Greater Buffalo Sports and Entertainment Complex, a Delaware-based LLC, presented a rendered plan created by architect firm HKS, Inc. to the Buffalo Common Council. The plan included a $1.4 billion, 72,000-seat retractable roof stadium, convention center, hotel and sports museum plan for the Buffalo Outer Harbor. At first this plan was met with some cynicism, in particular because of the feasibility of the project. On December 11, the company met with local AFL-CIO members to discuss the number of jobs created by the proposed project, which was said to be 10,000. Stracick also disclosed that there are "15 private, secret sponsors" willing to fund the project. He also stated that no tax money would be used to fund a stadium.

In January 2013, the group met with Erie County legislators, their second major appearance since October. During this meeting, the idea of having the Strong Foundation open a sports museum on the $1.8 billion premises was also strengthened. Howard Zemsky, chairman of the NFTA said that he was opposed to the project, referring to the idea of granting a nine to twelve month option on the waterfront land, saying simply "we're not doing that." In May 2013 the GBSEC submitted a $500,000 offer to the NFTA for the exclusive right to negotiate the purchase of 150 acres (61 ha) of outer harbor land. On August 26, 2014, it was announced that the Outer Harbor site was no longer being considered, after a study showed that at least four bridges would need to be built to effectively service the increase in traffic.

On May 11, 2014, another proposal for an outer harbor sports complex was announced by Buffalo Sportz Complex, known as "Olympia Sports Park." This complex would have been located slightly south of the GBSEC proposed site. Thomas Dee, President of the Erie County Harbor Development Corporation, acknowledged the proposal but also noted that similar projects, including the GBSEC proposal, also existed for competition.

On February 10, 2014, Governor Andrew Cuomo's administration appointed Buffalo Mayor Byron Brown, Niagara Falls Mayor Paul Dyster, Lt. Gov. Robert Duffy, Buffalo Niagara Partnership CEO Dottie Gallagher-Cohen and Empire State Development President Kenneth Adams to a new study board to discuss the feasibility and plans for a new stadium.

Later, on March 6, 2014, the County of Erie appointed its seven members to the board, including future New York State governor Kathy Hochul, then with M&T Bank, and Richard Tobe, the Deputy Erie County Executive.

Shortly after the death of team owner Ralph Wilson on March 27, 2014, the Bills selected their members for the panel, including U.S. Senator Chuck Schumer, Bills CEO and President Russ Brandon, local developer Louis Ciminelli, Bills CFO Jeff Littman, New Era Cap Co. CEO Christopher Koch among others. The group's first meeting was held on April 1.

On August 26, 2014, it was announced that the Niagara Falls (which may have used a large plot being held by Howard Milstein) and Buffalo Outer Harbor sites had been ruled out based on similar issues with infrastructure related to the two sites.

On November 5, 2014, Bills owners Terry and Kim Pegula joined the working group.

In mid–January 2015, AECOM, retained by the State of New York, released a report detailing suggested stadium sites based upon criteria of site size, cost of land, infrastructure and external development, among other factors. The study narrowed the search to four sites.

==== Initial planning and exploration ====
The Pegulas indicated on July 31, 2015, that they had no immediate plans to pursue a new stadium. The situation remained unchanged as of November 2017. By March 2018, the Pegulas had entered the "very early stages" of exploring long-term stadium options for the Bills. In September 2018, the Pegulas stated that they would begin planning the new stadium, or possibly renovating the current one, after the November 2018 gubernatorial elections, as state funding would likely be required.

During the fall of 2018, PS&E hired consultant CAA ICON to handle stadium planning for both the Bills and the Buffalo Sabres, with no constraints on potential locations. Concurrently, Erie County has created a new stadium fund, for which $500,000 was set aside in 2018 with the same amount earmarked for 2019. The first focus groups were assembled in February 2019.

Mark Poloncarz, the current county executive of Erie County, New York, stated in 2012 that a stadium in the city of Buffalo would not be feasible, as too much property in the city remained in private hands, which would trigger an eminent domain lawsuit if it were seized to build the stadium. He reiterated those concerns in 2019, though in that case he stopped short of ruling out a stadium within the city so as not to disrupt negotiations.

During the January 2020 State of the League address, NFL commissioner Roger Goodell stated in regard to the Bills' stadium plans: “Those are things that the group has to settle collectively and to address over the next several months, if not sooner.”

On June 18, 2021, the Pegulas chose Legends Global Planning to represent ownership, consult on a new stadium and sell sponsorships and premium seats for the venue. In addition, an unnamed source claimed that the Bills were planning to build a new stadium in Orchard Park to replace Highmark Stadium, with two of the television stations in Rochester, New York reporting the unnamed source's claims as fact. A June 19 report from WGRZ also neither confirmed nor denied by any officials, stated that the Bills strongly preferred to build a new stadium and not attempt any further renovations on Highmark Stadium.

=== Financing ===
In early August it was reported that Pegula Sports and Entertainment had made their first offer demanding full taxpayer funding of a new stadium in Orchard Park at a cost of $1.1 billion, part of a broader $1.5 billion package that would also include renovations to KeyBank Center, Buffalo's indoor sports arena. The Pegulas reportedly threatened to relocate the team to Austin, Texas if their demands were not met, though they had not contacted anybody in Austin prior to suggesting the idea.

On August 31, 2021, the Bills submitted their plans for a $1.4 billion, 60,000-seat stadium in Orchard Park to representatives of the state and Erie County to be completed by 2027. The proposed capacity was 12,000 seats less than Highmark Stadium and 1,500 seats less than Soldier Field, the lowest capacity stadium currently used in the NFL (and whose main tenant the Chicago Bears are also exploring a new stadium). The new venue does not include a roof, but was designed so that about 65% of seats would be protected from the elements. Civic leaders in Buffalo argued that Buffalo lacked the infrastructure to host a Super Bowl, nor any other event large enough to make full use of the venue outside of football. For that reason, they believed that the Bills should not bother trying to build a stadium for such events, nor bid for them. Western New York's harsh winters also played into the team's decision to make the new stadium open-air. Buffalo's reputation for cold, snowy weather often makes for compelling television and has long formed a part of the team's and city's identity.

On March 28, 2022, it was announced that a deal had been reached between New York State, Erie County and the Bills for the 63,000 seat, $1.4 billion dollar stadium in Orchard Park. New York State contributed $600 million in funding with Erie County contributing $250 million, the Bills contributing $350 million, and the National Football League via a G-4 loan $200 million. In addition the Bills signed a 30-year lease, with a buyout option after 15 years. The stadium would be owned by New York State, a change from the current stadium which is owned by Erie County. Of that $600 million funding, $418 million will come from funds seized from the Seneca Nation of New York for funds overdue as part of the compact to operate its Niagara Falls, Allegany and Buffalo Creek casino/resorts.

On August 9, 2023, the Associated Press reported that the costs of the stadium had increased by $300 million due to "increased labor and material costs", which the owners of the Bills are contractually obligated to pick up, due to the agreement.

Neil deMause, co-author of the book Field of Schemes (2008), has criticized the financing plan for not taking present value of money fully into account. For example, much of the construction money was paid upfront, whereas the hoped-for increases in economic activity and tax revenues are to take place over 30 years.

==== Future maintenance costs ====
The state also will contribute $280 million over a 30-year period for maintenance and $6 million per year over the course of the lease for capital improvements, both figures to be adjusted for inflation according to the Consumer Price Index.

=== Construction ===
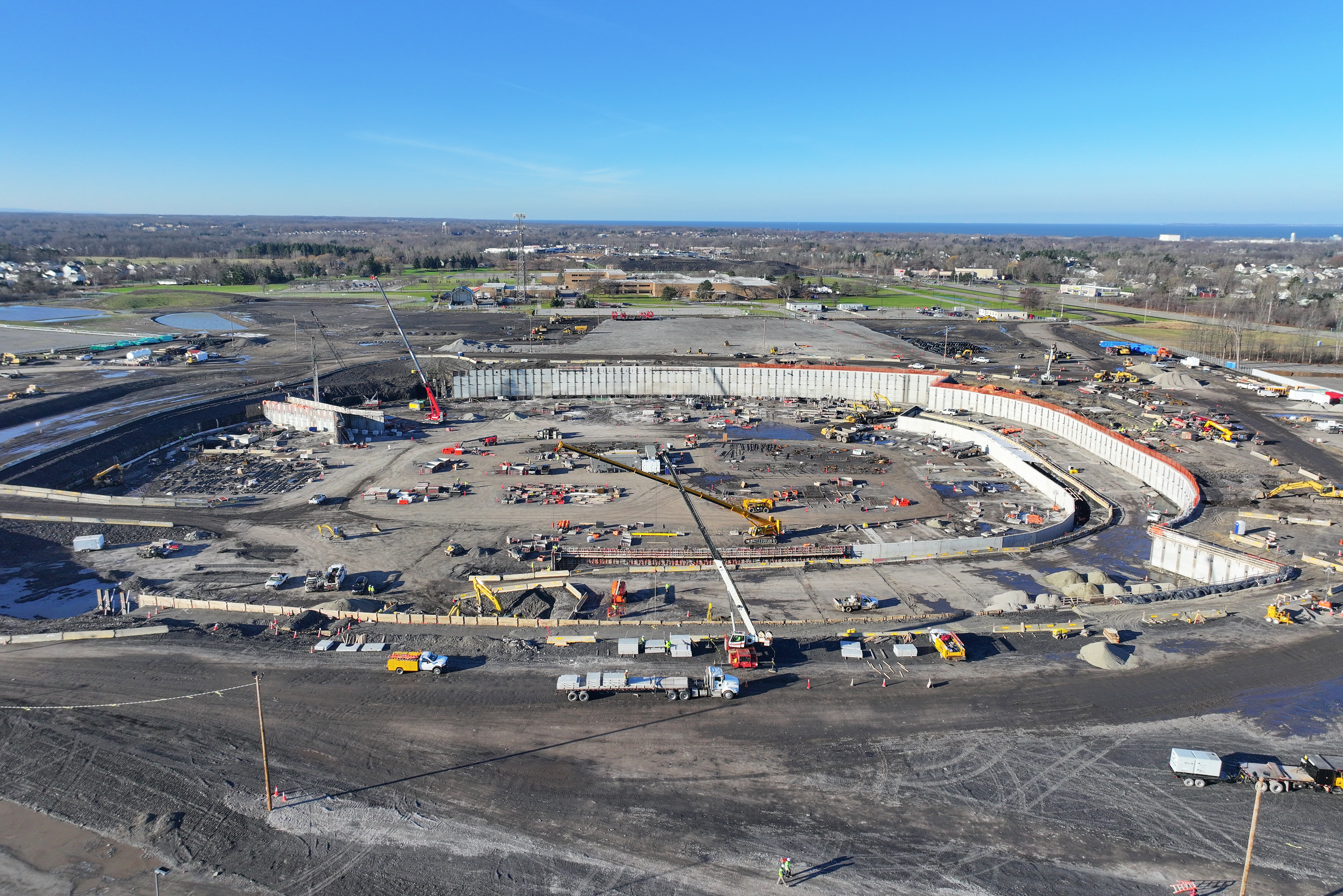
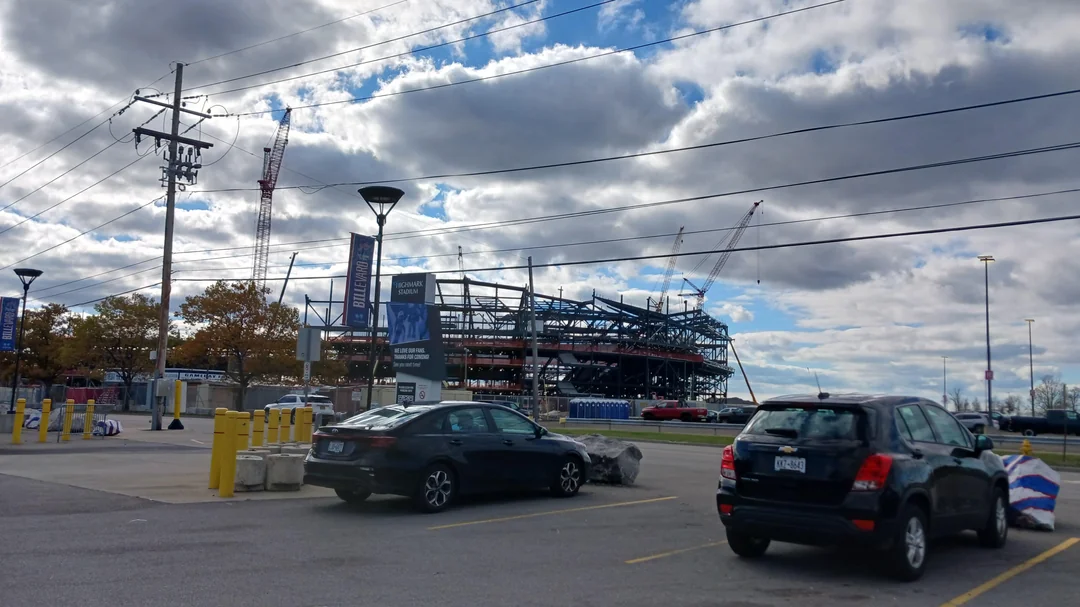
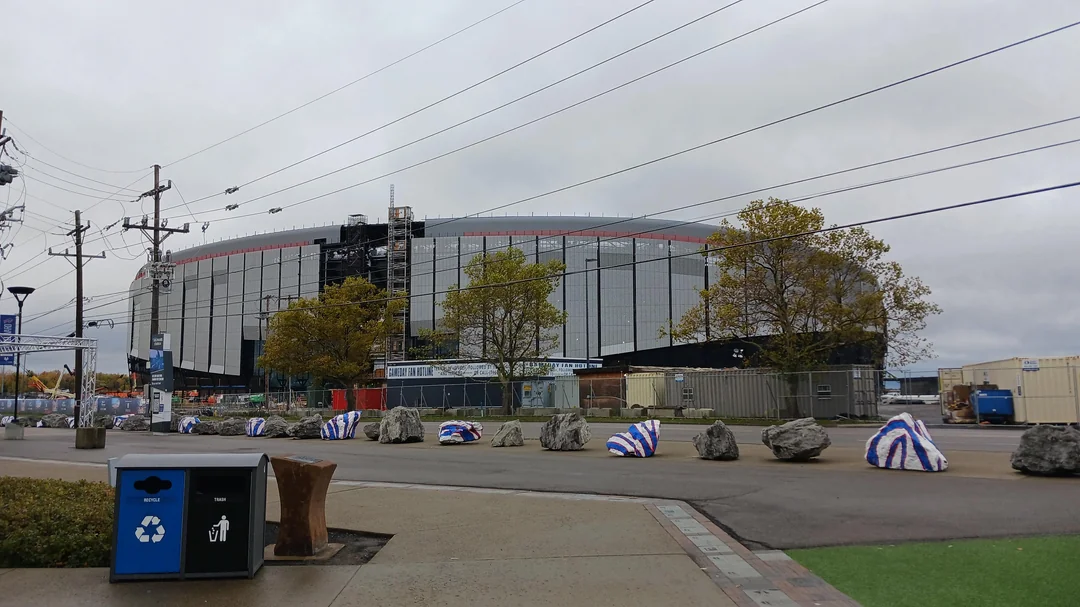

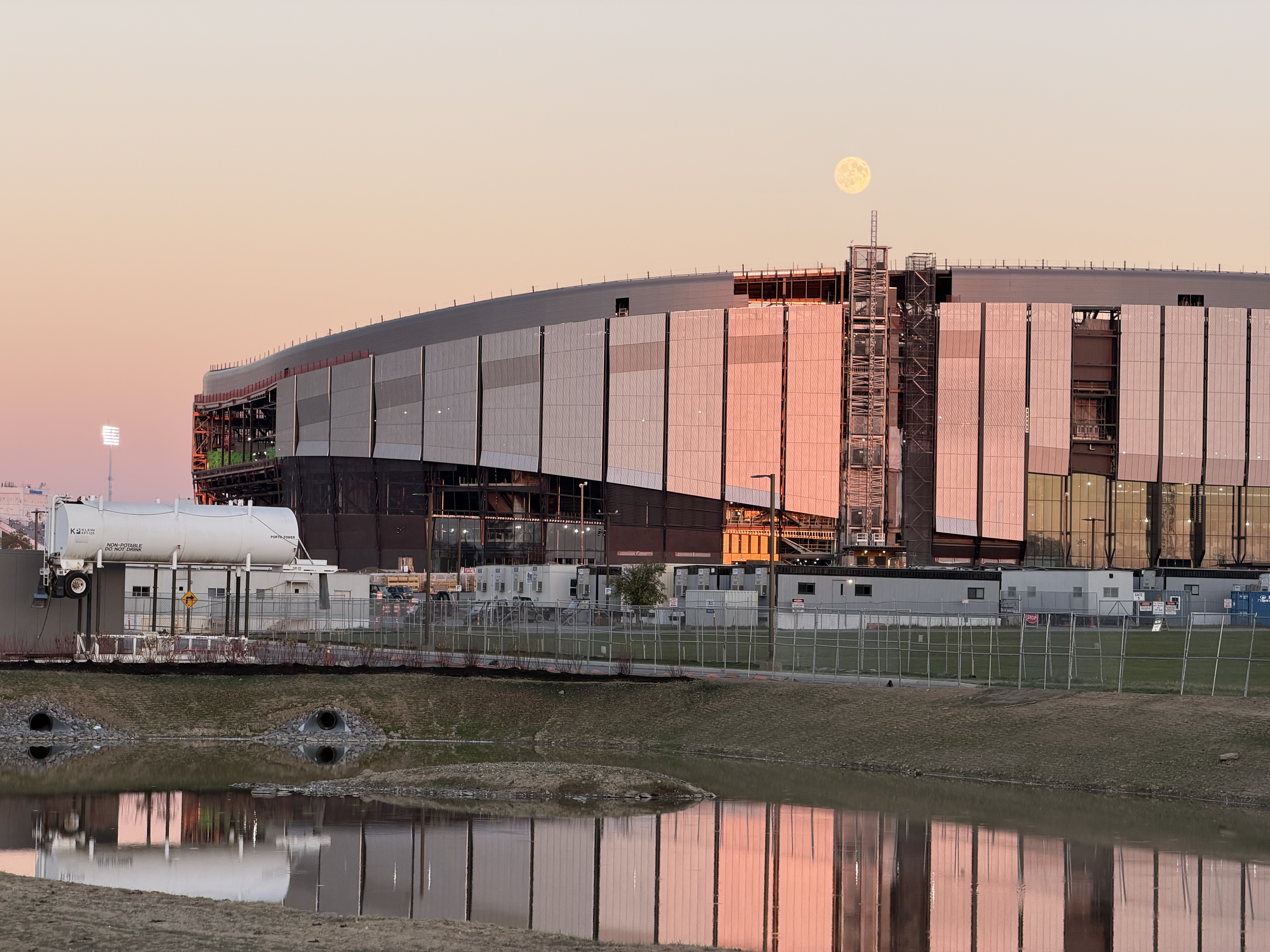
Various stages of the stadium's construction, 2023–2025

Ceremonial groundbreaking for the new stadium took place on June 5, 2023, leading into excavation work over the following months. By March 2024, excavation was nearly complete, with work commencing on concrete pouring and steel beam assembly. By August 2024, the steel had risen noticeably above ground. Observers have noted the similarity of the new stadium's design to that of Tottenham Hotspur Stadium in London. The stadium also added metal panels to provide weatherproofing, inspired by a similar design used on Kleinhans Music Hall.

The stadium's steel structure was topped out on April 4, 2025, as the final steel beam was added to the structure with Terry Pegula and his daughter Laura, Governor Hochul, and Roger Goodell attending the ceremony.

A ribbon cutting ceremony was held on June 23, 2026.

=== 2025 construction fire ===
On the morning of December 14, 2025, a minor fire occurred at the stadium, during construction from sparks from grinding related to welding. The fire was extinguished and resulted in no injuries or any significant damage to the stadium, and there was no delay to construction, according to officials.

=== Fan incidents ===
During the excavation phase in September 2023, a fan jumped over a fence guarding the construction site and fell into a hole 30-40 feet. He was found "covered in human excrement" and was under the influence of drugs and alcohol before being removed from the site.

Throughout the remainder of the Bills' 2023 season, fans continued jumping into the stadium site, later nicknamed "The Pit", with a superstition ongoing that "Feeding the Pit" would lead to a Bills win, as the Bills' 6-game win streak going into the playoffs coincided with someone falling into the stadium site before each game during that stretch.The Bills and the Erie County Sheriff's Office increased security around the site in response.

=== 2026 vandalism incident ===
On the evening of February 16, 2026, construction for the stadium was temporarily suspended, when workers discovered graffiti in several secure locations, in both finished and unfinished areas of the stadium. An investigation was launched into the matter. In a statement, a spokesperson reiterated the commitment to completing the stadium on time, when asked about any delays to construction. Erie County Executive Mark Poloncarz revealed that the graffiti that was spray painted by the vandals was both pornographic and homophobic in nature. On February 21, construction officials and investigators identified as many as seven workers, including two primary suspects, as the alleged perpetrators of the vandalism. Four private luxury suites were reported to have been vandalized by the alleged suspects. While two union workers were later fired as part of the investigation, no arrests or charges were filed by the Erie County District Attorney's Office.

=== Opening ===
A game at Highmark Stadium

On August 8, 2026, PSL holders of the stadium were able to attend a scrimmage and practice featuring the team called The Return of the Blue & Red. This was the first opportunity fans were able to go inside the stadium and players were able to use the field. Official attendance for the scrimmage was 51,807 according to Bills Chief Operating Officer, Pete Guelli.

The first Bills game at the stadium was a preseason game against the Carolina Panthers on August 15, 2026, which the Bills won 29–14. The first regular season game was their week 2 matchup against the Detroit Lions on September 17. Bills quarterback Josh Allen scored the stadium's first touchdown on a 1-yard sneak on the opening drive in a 41–31 win.

== Naming ==
Bison statues at Family Circle

New Era Cap Company held right of first refusal for the naming rights to the proposed venue; they surrendered that right in 2020.

The stadium's naming rights are held by Highmark Blue Cross Blue Shield, which entered into an initial 10-year agreement with the Bills for their previous stadium on March 29, 2021. The Bills announced on June 5, 2023, during a groundbreaking ceremony that its naming rights deal with Highmark had been extended, with the "Highmark Stadium" name carrying over to the new venue. To avoid confusion with the current venue, it was referred to as "New Highmark Stadium" during construction. Terms of the extended naming agreement were not released, with Bills executive vice president and chief operating officer Ron Raccuia simply referring to it as a "long-term deal" during an interview with The Buffalo News; Highmark had rights of first refusal during naming rights negotiations, which "wrapped quickly".

== Tenants and events ==
The stadium serves as the home of the Buffalo Bills.

=== NHL ===
On October 10, 2025, National Hockey League commissioner Gary Bettman committed to a future NHL Winter Classic to be held at the stadium, with the league setting a nonbinding target for the 2028 Winter Classic to celebrate the 20th anniversary of the inaugural "Ice Bowl" at the previous stadium.

== Reception ==
The stadium's first large-scale public event, the Bills' annual "Return of the Blue & Red" open practice, drew 51,807 spectators on August 8, 2026, and was restricted to season ticket holders. The venue was well received by players and coaches, and the Bills said the majority of fan feedback was positive. The wide concourses, which allow views of the field from all levels, along with the restrooms and seating width, were praised.

Several aspects of the stadium drew criticism following the event. Photographs circulated on social media showing seats with views obstructed by railings, safety glass partitions and staircases, and some personal seat license holders said the views differed from those presented during the sales process. The video boards were criticized as small relative to those at other recently built NFL venues, the sound system performed poorly, and spectators in sections marketed as covered were soaked during a downpour, despite promotional material indicating the canopy would shelter about 65% of seats. Further complaints concerned the steepness of the upper seating levels and the absence of restrooms at their highest points.

Team president Pete Guelli said on August 10 that fewer than one percent of personal seat license holders had raised sightline concerns, that the views were consistent with the team's virtual seating tool, and that complaints would be handled individually. Vice president of game presentation Chris Polka said the video boards were the size the team had intended, and attributed the audio problems to practice conditions, since additional speakers had been placed on the field to simulate crowd noise. According to the Rochester Democrat and Chronicle, the boards were deliberately kept modest because owner Terry Pegula wanted spectators focused on the field.

Attendance costs also drew criticism. A study by The Action Network ranked the stadium as the most expensive in the NFL for a family of four to attend a game, at $2,193.95 against a league average of $1,474.55, and found its $132 parking charge to be the highest in the league. The Bills had not previously charged personal seat licenses, which at the new stadium range from $750 to $50,000 per seat, and some season ticket holders faced roughly double the cost for seats comparable to those they had held at the previous stadium. Fans also noted that beverages are sold in smaller sizes than at the previous stadium.

The natural grass playing surface, Kentucky bluegrass installed in October 2025, lost sod during both preseason games, and one Bills player, speaking anonymously, described the field as being in poor condition while noting it was early in the surface's life. On August 29, 2026, the Bills announced that the entire field would be re-sodded before the regular-season home opener on September 17.

== See also ==
- History of the Buffalo Bills
- Ralph Wilson Stadium
- War Memorial Stadium (Buffalo)
- Lists of stadiums

Preceded by Ralph Wilson Stadium	Home of the Buffalo Bills; 2026–present	Succeeded by none
