= Highmark Stadium (disambiguation) =

Highmark Stadium is the home stadium of the Buffalo Bills of the National Football League set to open in 2026.

Highmark Stadium may also refer to:

- Ralph Wilson Stadium, home stadium of the Buffalo Bills from 1973–2026, which was named "Highmark Stadium" from 2021–2026
- F.N.B. Stadium (Pittsburgh), home stadium of Pittsburgh Riverhounds SC of the USL Championship, which was named "Highmark Stadium" from 2013–2026
