= Thomas C. Perry =

American politician

Mayor of Akron, New York
- In office 1987–1991

Personal details
- Born: Thomas Charles Perry; April 6, 1941 Batavia, New York
- Died: June 4, 2017 (aged 76)
- Spouse: Marilyn Peterson (m. 1962)
- Children: 3
- Parent(s): Esther Buchele; Marlo Perry
- Education: Michigan State University
- Known for: President and CEO of Perry's Ice Cream

Thomas Charles Perry (April 6, 1941 – June 4, 2017) was a politician and the former president and chairman of Perry's Ice Cream.

== Early life ==
Thomas C. Perry was born on April 6, 1941, in Batavia, New York, the son of Esther Buchele and Marlo Perry, a former Akron village trustee and mayor who was a 1935 graduate of Cornell University. His brothers were Dale Perry and Allyn Perry and his sister was Linda Perry Capan. His grandfather was H. Morton Perry, the founder of Perry's Ice Cream in 1918.

He attended high school in Akron, New York, and later graduated from Michigan State University with a degree in food science with a focus on dairy business. He received an honorary doctorate from Buffalo State College, in 2005.

== Career ==
After graduating from Michigan State University, joined Perry’s full-time in 1963. He was promoted to operations manager in 1971. He spearheaded the design for a new ice cream plant, which tripled Perry's production capacity. In 1982, he succeeded his father as president and chief executive officer and became chairman of the board in 1988, following his father’s death. In 1999, he was a finalist for the Ernst & Young Entrepreneur of the Year Award.

He stepped down as president in 1994, and retired as chief executive officer in 2000, and was succeeded by Robert Denning, his son-in-law. He served as chairman of the board and, at the time of his death, chairman emeritus.

=== Political career ===
Perry served on the Village of Akron Board from 1975 to 1987 and was mayor from 1987 to 1991.

== Personal life ==
In December 1962, he married Marilyn Peterson. Together, they were the parents of:

- Brian Perry, who married Jayne
- Gayle Perry Denning, who married Robert Denning in 1989.
- Marcia Perry, who married Alvaro Rodriguez

Perry died, aged 76, on June 4, 2017, after a lengthy illness.
