= Victory Brewing Company =

Brewery founded in 1996 in Downingtown, Pennsylvania

Coordinates: 40°00′16″N 75°41′39″W

- Location: Downingtown, Pennsylvania
- Opened: 1996
- Key people: Ron Barchet and Bill Covaleski
- Annual production volume: 125,713 US beer barrels (147,521 hL) in 2014
- Parent: Artisanal Brewing Ventures
- Website: victorybeer.com

Victory Brewing Company (Victory) is a brewery founded in 1996 in Downingtown, Pennsylvania, United States. The main brands are HopDevil, Prima Pils, Headwaters Pale Ale, Golden Monkey, DirtWolf, and Storm King, which are distributed in 34 states and nine countries. Victory Brewing is located at 420 Acorn Lane Downingtown, Pennsylvania 19335.

== History ==
Founded in 1996 by Ron Barchet and Bill Covaleski in an old Pepperidge Farm bakery, Victory has grown considerably and evolved well outside the traditional small market of a beer-brewing restaurant. The brewery's first three beers were Victory Festbier, Brandywine Valley Lager (now Victory Lager), and HopDevil Ale. Initially they thought that the malt forward Victory Festbier would become their most popular beer. However, they soon realized that consumers craved very hoppy beers, such as HopDevil Ale, the most. On February 16, 2016, Victory allied with Southern Tier Brewing Company of Lakewood, NY to become part of the Artisanal Brewing Ventures holding company.

== Brewery ==
The brewery uses an automated, energy recovery, 50-US-beer-barrel (59 hl) system designed and manufactured by Rolec in Chieming, OberBayern, Germany. Victory also brews using traditional methods where appropriate, such as using the energy intensive decoction process for production of certain German style lager beers. Victory uses whole hops.

The restaurant was completely remodeled in spring of 2008 with a new focus on smoked barbecue. A growler filler was installed during the renovation that allows any of 20 draft beers to be routed to the counter-pressure growler filler. This device includes a CO_{2} evacuation step, increasing the shelf life of the beer compared to direct spigot filling. The growlers are 68 US fluid ounces (0.53 US gal; 2.0 L). Victory makes their own root beer, which is also served in the restaurant.

== Products ==
Victory produces over 20 brands of beer, some of which are: Year-Round

- Prima Pils: German Pilsner with whole flower European hops and German malt. (5.3% ABV).
- HopDevil: India Pale Ale brewed with American hops with hints of pine and citrus. (6.7% ABV).
- Headwaters Pale Ale: American Pale Ale made with American hops and German malt. (5.2% ABV).
- Golden Monkey: A Belgian-style Tripel brewed with Belgian yeast, banana, and clove. (9.5% ABV).
- Victory Helles Lager: German-style Helles crafted with German hops, malts, and yeast. (4.8% ABV).
- DirtWolf Double IPA: Double India Pale Ale brewed with Mosaic, Citra, Chinook, and Simcoe hops. (8.7% ABV).
- Sour Monkey: Sour Brett Tripel, a tart fruity twist on Victory's Golden Monkey. (9.5% ABV).

Seasonal / Limited Release

- Cage Radler: Radler containing lager and sparkling lemon soda. (3.0% ABV). Summer Seasonal.
- Summer Love Ale: Golden Ale brewed with lemon and pine. (5.2% ABV). Summer Seasonal.
- Festbier: Märzen / Oktoberfest made with German hops and malts. (5.6% ABV). Fall Seasonal.
- Moonglow Weizenbock: Bavarian Weizenbock brewed with German hops and clove. (8.7% ABV). Fall Seasonal.
- Winter Cheer: Wheat Ale crafted with German wheat, barley malts, and oats with spices added. (6.7% ABV). Winter Seasonal.
- Hop Ranch: Imperial India Pale Ale dry-hopped with six different hops. (9.0% ABV). Winter Seasonal.
- Kirsch Gose: Cherry Gose brewed with tart cherries and two different wheats. (4.7% ABV). Spring Seasonal.
- Blackboard Series

Blackboard Agave IPA: India Pale Ale with Grapefruit. (7.0% ABV).

Blackboard Berliner Weisse: Berliner Weisse with elderflower. (5.2% ABV).

Blackboard Cream Ale: Cream Ale with cold brew coffee added. (6.5% ABV).

- Anniversary Releases

Anniversary 20: Experimental India Pale Ale brewed with citrus and pine. (5.5% ABV).

21st Birthday IPA: Birthday India Pale Ale crafted with Chinook, Centennial, and Mosaic hops. (6.1% ABV).

- Tank to Table Series: There is a new recipe released every other month, these brewpub-only brews bring experimental ingredients, recipes, and techniques directly from their tanks to cans available at your table.

22-US-fluid-ounce (650 ml) Bottles Only

- Old Horizontal: American Barleywine brewed with German malts and American hops. (11% ABV).
- Helios Ale: Saison with Brettanomyces. (7.5% ABV).
- Hoppy Quad: Belgian-style Quad crafted with Chinook, Mosaic, Cascade, and Citra hops. (13% ABV).
- Java Cask: Coffee Bourbon Stout aged in bourbon barrels and brewed with coffee and dark chocolate. (14.3% ABV).
- Jubilee: Biere Brut brewed with German Blanc hops and aged in sparkling wine barrels. (12.0% ABV).
- Selene Saison: Dark Saison crafted with a unique dark yeast. (7.5% ABV).
- Sour Monkey Remix: American Wild Ale, Victory's Sour monkey recipe aged in Chardonnay barrels. (9.5% ABV).
- Tart Ten: Sour Dubbel Ale made with six different malts. (10.0% ABV).
- V Twelve: Belgian Strong Ale brewed with apricot, pear, and spice flavors. (12.0% ABV).

== Catering ==
Victory Brewing is a full service caterer and offers full party planning for many events. They offer a brewpub on wheels, which is a mobile catering kitchen. It has enough food and beer to serve up to 1000 people and has a cooler capacity of 16 kegs (2500 servings of cold beer).

== Awards ==
- Sustainable Agriculture Business Leadership Award – 2014
- Good Food Awards, Beer – 2011

Philly Beer Scene Awards

Year	Award	Winner
2010–2014	Brewery of the Year	Victory Brewing Company
2013	Brewmaster of the Year	Bill Covaleski
2010, 2011	Best Pilsner	Prima Pils
2010	Best Porter	Baltic Thunder
2011	Best Belgian Style	Golden Monkey
2011–2013	Best Stout	Storm King
2011	Best Fruit / Spice Beer	Saison du BUFF (shared with Dogfish Head and Stone)
2012, 2014	Best Lager	Prima Pils
2014	Best Imperial Pale Ale	DirtWolf

Golden Icon Awards by Travolta Family Entertainment

Year	Award	Category	Beer
2006–2007	Golden Icon	Best Specialty Beer	Victory Golden Monkey

United States Beer Tasting Championship

Year	Award	Beer
2011, 2013	Best of the Mid-Atlantic/Southeast region	Headwaters Pale Ale
2013	Grand Champion	Headwaters Pale Ale
2001–2005, 2007, 2008, 2013	Best of the Mid-Atlantic/Southeast region	Prima Pils
2002–2005, 2013	Grand Champion	Prima Pils
2000, 2002, 2003, 2007, 2009	Best of the Mid-Atlantic/Southeast region	HopDevil IPA
2008	Best of the Mid-Atlantic/Southeast region	Festbier
2008	Grand Champion	Festbier
2000, 2004, 2006	Best of the Mid-Atlantic/Southeast region	Victory Lager
2000, 2004	Grand Champion	Victory Lager
2003–2005	Best of the Mid-Atlantic/Southeast region	Storm King
2006, 2007, 2012	Best of the Mid-Atlantic/Southeast region	V-Twelve
2012	Grand Champion	V-Twelve
2005, 2008	Best of the Mid-Atlantic/Southeast region	Whirlwind Wit
2006	Best of the Mid-Atlantic/Southeast region	St. Boisterous
2006	Grand Champion	St. Boisterous
2011, 2013	Best of the Mid-Atlantic/Southeast region	Yakima Glory

- Gold Medal – Festbier, GABF 2007
- Gold Medal – Golden Monkey, GABF 2014
- Silver Medal – Prima Pils, GABF 2007
