= American Energy Partners, LP =

Former American energy products company

- Type: Private
- Industry: Oil and natural gas
- Founder: Aubrey K. McClendon
- Headquarters: Oklahoma City, Oklahoma, United States
- Key people: Aubrey K. McClendon (chairman and CEO)
- Products: Natural gas, natural gas liquids and oil
- Website: www.americanenergypartners.com

American Energy Partners, LP, also known as AELP, was an American natural gas and oil company founded in April 2013 by Aubrey K. McClendon. The company managed affiliates responsible for natural shale gas and oil production and exploration in the United States, as well as management of assets, minerals, royalties and non-operated properties. It was headquartered in Oklahoma City, Oklahoma, and employed over 450 people as of August 2015. AELP announced on May 18, 2016, two months after McClendon's death, that it would end operations and close by the end of summer 2016.

== History ==
Oklahoma City businessman Aubrey K. McClendon founded American Energy Partners in April 2013 after leaving Chesapeake Energy Corporation, the company he co-founded and ran as CEO for 24 years.

AELP began with a staff of 12 based in Oklahoma City. In its first year, it generated $1.7 billion in funding to develop and drill approximately 110,000 net acres of the Utica Shale formation in Ohio. McClendon received initial financial backing in the form of $1.25 billion from The Energy & Minerals Group, founded and managed by John T. Raymond, and First Reserve Corporation.

During AELP's first two years, it focused on acquiring assets, building management teams and acquiring financing to enter natural gas and oil plays in Ohio, West Virginia, Oklahoma and Texas. The company created affiliates to focus on each of these areas. By the fall of 2014, AELP had raised a total of $14 billion in capital commitments to fund its acquisitions. Of that, $3.5 billion came from The Energy & Minerals Group. In February 2014, the company added to its initial 110,000 acres when it bought an additional 130,000 acres in the Utica Shale play; including 74,000 acres from Hess Corporation and 56,000 acres from ExxonMobil Corporation. That month, AELP also bought its first holdings in Oklahoma's Woodford Shale with the purchase of 120,000 acres from Calyx Energy II. In June 2014, the company acquired 63,000 acres of Texas' Permian from Enduring Resources II. In August of that year, the company bought 75,000 acres in Ohio's Utica Shale and West Virginia's Marcellus Shale plays from Terrence Pegula's East Resources, a $1.75 billion sale that freed up capital for Pegula to purchase the Buffalo Bills. AELP invested another $251 million into Oklahoma shale drilling in November 2014. By May 2015, the company's affiliates had acquired 600,000 net acres in four states through its series of acquisitions.

Also during its first two years of operation, AELP expanded in other areas beyond natural gas and oil exploration, including natural gas infrastructure when it launched American Energy – Midstream, LLC, in June 2014. Additionally in June 2014, Energy Transfer Partners LP announced that AELP would ship natural gas from the Utica shale play to the Midwest, Great Lakes, Gulf Coast and Ontario, Canada, using Energy Transfer's proposed Rover Pipeline. American Energy – Midstream and Regency Energy Partners agreed in August 2014 to construct and manage a $500 million, 52-mile pipeline from the Utica to the Rockies Express Pipeline and Texas Eastern Transmission Pipeline.

In June 2015, the company announced that the affiliate holding its Utica and Marcellus subsidiaries, American Energy – Appalachia, LLC, had been renamed Ascent Resources, LLC. AELP stated that Ascent Resources would become an independent company. Two weeks later, the company announced that another affiliate, American Energy – Midstream, would also transition into a new company called Traverse Midstream Partners LLC, effective July 1, 2015.

The company announced two deals with Australian companies in August 2015, expanding the company's operations internationally. A letter of intent between AELP and Armour Energy Ltd. gave AELP a stake in 21.5 million acres of drilling rights. AELP also entered another deal for rights to 14.6 million acres from Empire Energy Group Ltd.

== Operations and locations ==
Based in Oklahoma City, Oklahoma, American Energy Partners' business model is to create affiliate companies focusing on specific locations and aspects of the natural gas and oil industry. These affiliates then transition to independent companies, and, as markets allow, pursue IPOs. AELP and the affiliates it has created work in the areas of natural gas and oil production and exploration in the Utica Shale formation in Ohio, Marcellus Shale formation in West Virginia, Woodford Shale formation in Oklahoma and the Wolfcamp Shale in Texas. The company also operated an affiliate to manage midstream pipelines until American Energy – Midstream spun off as its own company named Traverse Midstream Partners on July 1, 2015. It also provides asset management services.

=== Affiliates ===
As of August 2015, AELP's affiliates include: American Energy – Permian Basin, LLC (AEPB); American Energy – Woodford, LLC (AEW); American Energy – NonOp, LLC (AENO), which owns nonoperated natural gas and oil properties; and American Energy – Minerals, LLC (AEMN), which acquires minerals and overriding royalty interests.

Additionally, AELP has created affiliates to raise money to fund acquisition of natural gas and oil properties, as well as own international properties.

Five of the affiliates have transitioned into standalone companies: Ascent Resources, formerly American Energy – Appalachia; and Traverse Midstream Partners, formerly American Energy – Midstream. Ascent is itself a merger of AELP's Utica and Marcellus affiliates which owns 235,000 net acres producing an estimated 280 million cubic feet equivalent daily, and the company estimates its assets contain 1.8 trillion cubic feet equivalent of proven reserves. Permian Resources, LLC was officially formed from the American Energy-Permian Basin affiliate as of April 1, 2016. The Oklahoma affiliate, American Energy-Woodford, became White Star Petroleum, LLC earlier in 2016.

== Corporate affairs ==
The company is led by founder, chairman and CEO Aubrey K. McClendon. As of August 2015, it employed more than 450 people, most of which were based in Oklahoma City. In December 2014, the company was ranked first among large corporations on The Oklahoman's "Top Workplaces 2014" list.

=== Chesapeake Energy Corporation lawsuit ===
Chesapeake Energy Corporation (NYSE: CHK) filed suit against American Energy Partners on February 17, 2015. Chesapeake alleged that McClendon, its former CEO, had taken data from Chesapeake prior to leaving the company to use with American Energy. McClendon said his severance agreements allowed for him to take certain information. The American Energy – Utica affiliate, not controlled by McClendon, settled on April 14, 2015. The complaint continued against American Energy and other affiliates. An Oklahoma County judge ruled in May 2015 that Chesapeake's complaint against American Energy must go to arbitration, not through the courts.
