= East Resources =

Oil and gas company in the US

- Type: Private
- Industry: Oil and natural gas
- Founded: 1983
- Founder: Terrence Pegula
- Headquarters: 7777 NW Beacon Square Blvd, Boca Raton, Florida, United States
- Products: Natural gas, natural gas liquids and oil
- Website: www.eastresourcesinc.com

East Resources, Inc., was an oil and gas exploration and production company with a focus on unconventional shale oil and gas resources in the United States.

== History ==
The company was founded in 1983 by Terrence Pegula. Based in Cattaraugus County, New York through much of the late 20th century the company specialized in oil. In 2008, the company began focusing on natural gas through hydraulic fracturing. It profited heavily upon discovery of deep layers of natural gas in the Marcellus Formation and development of the hydraulic fracturing ("fracking") recovery process. At the height of the company it was based in Parkersburg, West Virginia with additional offices in Warrendale, Pennsylvania, Allegany, New York, and Denver, Colorado, with natural gas processing facilities in Northern Pennsylvania.

East Resources sold most of its assets to Royal Dutch Shell in 2010 for $4.7 billion and the rest to American Energy Partners, LP in 2014 for $1.75 billion.

Pegula has shifted his focus to sports and entertainment properties, acquiring the Buffalo Sabres in 2011 and the Buffalo Bills in 2014.

== Today ==
Pegula continues to own some natural gas assets through other companies, including Greater Rocky Mountain Regional Oil & Gas in Colorado and Wyoming, and JKLM Energy (named after the initials of Pegula's children) in Pennsylvania. The remains of the company are based in Boca Raton, Florida.

== See also ==
- Pegula Sports and Entertainment – sports and entertainment company formed from Pegula's sale of East Resources
