= Harborcenter =

Mixed use hockey themed development in Buffalo, New York

LECOM Harborcenter
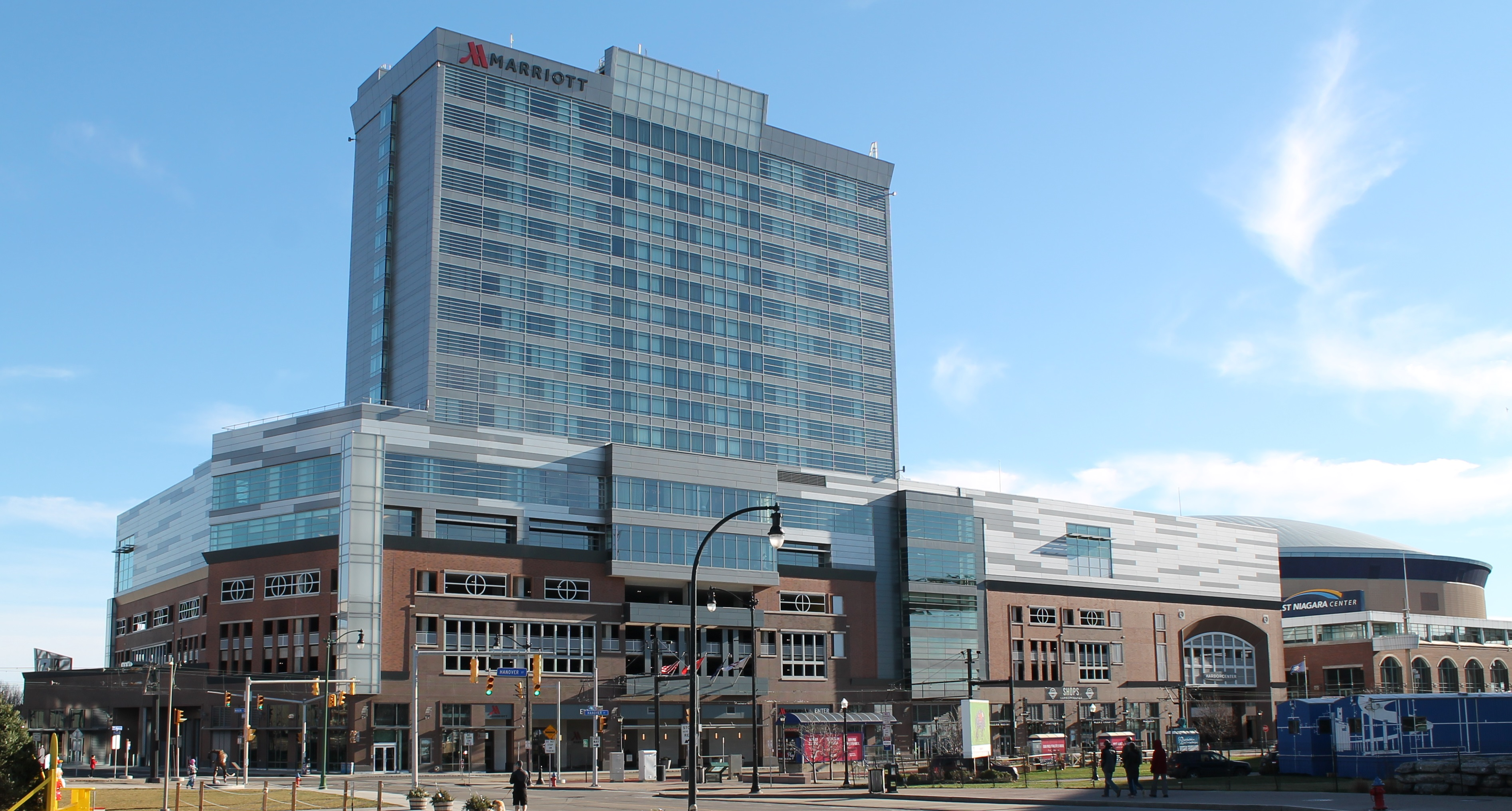
- Interactive map of the LECOM Harborcenter area

General information
- Status: Completed
- Type: Stadium, commercial, hotel
- Architectural style: Postmodern architecture
- Location: 100 Washington St, Buffalo, New York, United States
- Coordinates: 42.87664°N 78.876686°W
- Construction started: March 1, 2013
- Topped-out: June 25, 2014
- Completed: October/November 2014 (Restaurants/rinks/training facility); August 2015 (hotel)
- Opening: October 31, 2014 / November 6, 2014
- Cost: US$ 172.2 million (est)
- Owner: Terry Pegula
- Operator: Buffalo Sabres

Height
- Roof: 240 ft (73 m)

Technical details
- Floor count: 20
- Floor area: 600,000 sq ft (56,000 m^{2})

Design and construction
- Architecture firm: Populous
- Developer: Harborcenter Development, LLC
- Main contractor: Mortenson Construction

Other information
- Number of rooms: Hotel: 205 rooms
- Parking: 750 spaces

Website
- lecomharborcenter.com

The Rinks at Harborcenter

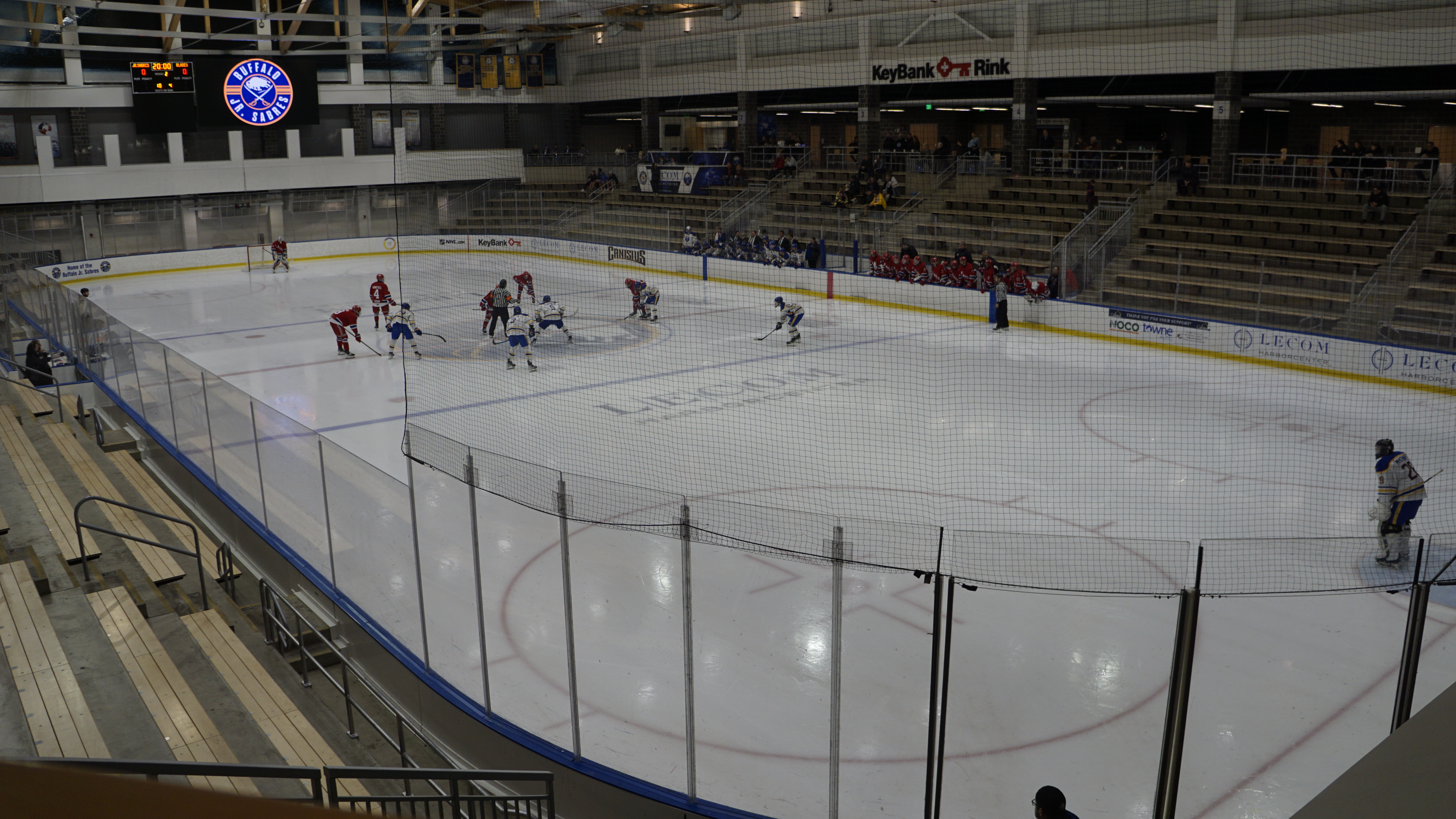
- Interactive map of The Rinks at Harborcenter
- Location: 7th Floor
- Owner: Terry Pegula
- Operator: Buffalo Sabres
- Capacity: 1,800 (Rink 1); 150 (Rink 2)
- Surface: 200' x 85' (Rinks 1 and 2)
- Public transit: Buffalo Metro Rail (Canalside)

Construction
- Groundbreaking: March 1, 2013
- Opened: October 31, 2014

Tenants
- Canisius Golden Griffins (NCAA) 2014–present Buffalo Jr. Sabres (OJHL) 2014–present Buffalo Beauts (NWHL) 2015–2019; Erie Kats (NJCAA) 2014–2018; Buffalo Sabres (practice facility)

LECOM Harborcenter is an American mixed-use development in Buffalo, New York, developed by Pegula Sports and Entertainment. The building occupies a full 1.7 acre city block formerly known as the Webster Block, directly across from and connected to the KeyBank Center and Canalside. The building is also near the southern terminus of the Canalside station.

The development features retail and restaurant space, a 205-room Buffalo Marriott Harborcenter Hotel, as well as two hockey rinks that are the home of the Buffalo Jr. Sabres of the Ontario Junior Hockey League, the Canisius Golden Griffins of the NCAA, and the Erie Kats of the National Junior College Athletic Association. The rinks are also the Buffalo Sabres practice facility. Since 2015, the NHL draft combine has been held at the KeyBank Center and the Harborcenter.

== Operations ==
Harborcenter was financed by Buffalo Sabres owner Terry Pegula and is owned by the Pegula's company Pegula Sports and Entertainment. The building contains indoor parking for 750 vehicles, and features two NHL regulation indoor ice rinks on the building's sixth floor, one with an 1,800-seat capacity and the other with a 150-seat capacity. IMPACT Sports Performance owned by the Pegulas operates Harborcenter's 5,000 square foot, high performance off-ice training facility located on the building's 6th floor. The building also contains a classroom and RapidShot Hockey Training System.

The development is one of the most expensive for any privately funded single building in the city of Buffalo history. The project is designed to achieve LEED certification, with a goal of LEED Silver. The building was pledged by Pegula and others involved upon obtaining the property to open at the time by September 2014 making it one of the faster projects in the area.

On September 10, 2019, Pegula Sports and Entertainment reached a 10-year naming rights agreement for the building with Lake Erie College of Osteopathic Medicine (LECOM).

== Construction ==
The beginning concept for the building, specifically the dual ice rinks and parking garage combo came after Buffalo Sabres chief development officer Cliff Benson led a group of team officials to Washington, D.C. to view the Washington Capitals practice facility, the Kettler Capitals Iceplex. The complex, which is built on top of a parking garage, has seating for 1,200, a training center, and a proshop. This trip helped the group form their ideas. Originally planned to be two hockey rinks on top of a parking garage, the hotel and restaurant concepts were later added to the plan by Terry Pegula's wife, Kim Pegula.

Construction of the 20-story Harborcenter began in March 2013, the same month the Webster Block was purchased from the City of Buffalo for $2.2 million. The building was built by Mortenson Construction with ICON Venue Group serving as the project manager. The building's hockey rink portion topped out on June 25, 2014, as the last structural beam for the hotel was put into place. Building construction was completed on the whole building in August 2015. The rinks and restaurants opened on October 31 and November 6, 2014. The hotel opened on August 27, 2015.

== Commercial tenants ==
The building contains a 205-room Marriott hotel operated by Shaner Hotels, plus retail and restaurant space. A two floor 716 Food and Sport restaurant opened on October 31, 2014. Also, Harborcenter features a flagship Tim Hortons that pays tribute to Tim Horton, the Buffalo Sabres, and the former Buffalo Memorial Auditorium. The restaurant opened on October 30, 2014. A Statue of Tim Horton was dedicated across the street the same day. The building also contains a pro shop.

The building also has storefronts along Main Street known as The Shops at HarborCanter for smaller street front tenants which are expected to be leased out. The first store that opened in Harborcenter was Red Siren, which is a women's specialty store. It features gifts, jewelry, leather and clothing not currently found in the Buffalo area. Red Siren opened in the Summer of 2015, around the time when the Mariott Harborcenter Hotel opened. Other stores include Modern Nostalgia, Fowler's Chocolates and Clayton's Toys & Gifts. It was announced in July 2016 that Modern Nostalgia would be leaving Harborcenter. They were replaced by Healthy Scratch, a quick-serve restaurant and boutique operated by Kelly and Jessica Pegula. Clayton's, Fowler's and Red Siren all announced their departure from Harborcenter in September 2017, with employees citing slow sales and inconsistent traffic for their departure.

In May 2015, it was announced that Advanced Care Physical Therapy would lease space inside Impact Sports Performance, located inside the Harborcenter. This provides sports medicine services to athletes and employees who use the facility.

== Hockey tenants ==
The development's two ice rinks, known collectively as The Rinks, is the home of the Canisius Golden Griffins, an NCAA Division I college hockey program in Buffalo, as well as the Buffalo Jr. Sabres with the Griffins and Junior Sabres playing in the larger rink 1 known as KeyBank Rink at Harborcenter with separate dedicated dressing rooms. Rink 1 is also home to the Erie Community College Kats's of the NJCAA. The smaller rink 2 is known as New Wave Energy Rink under a separate naming rights deal.

The NHL Scouting Combine has been hosted in Buffalo since 2015, when it was moved from Toronto to the KeyBank Center and the Harborcenter under a two-year pact. Buffalo also hosted the NHL entry draft in 2016. The NHL subsequently announced that it would continue to hold the combine in Buffalo through at least 2019.

In 2016, the CHA conference tournament in women's college hockey began to be hosted at Harborcenter.

From June 22 to July 3, 2017, rink 1 hosted a charity event known as 11 Day Power Play, which set a world record for the longest continuous hockey game. It has since become an annual event at Harborcenter.

In September 2018, it was announced that the Atlantic Hockey Tournament, an NCAA Division I Men's ice hockey league tournament would be moving to Harborcenter from Rochester's Blue Cross Arena starting in 2019.

=== Other events ===
- The 2015 IPC Ice Sledge Hockey World Championships were held at Harborcenter.
- In January 2016, the venue hosted the inaugural National Women's Hockey League all-star game.
- The 2018 World Junior Ice Hockey Championships were co-hosted by the KeyBank Rink and KeyBank Center.
- The 2025 World Para Ice Hockey Championships are slated to be held at Harborcenter in May 2025.

== See also ==
- Canalside
- Delaware North Building
- KeyBank Center
- List of tallest buildings in Buffalo, New York

Events and tenants
Preceded by Buffalo State Sports Arena	Home of the Canisius Golden Grifffins; 2014–present	Succeeded by current
Preceded by first arena	Host of the Buffalo Beauts; 2015–2019	Succeeded by Northtown Center
Preceded by Northtown Center	Home of the Buffalo Jr. Sabres; 2014–present	Succeeded by current
Preceded by Bell Centre; Montreal and Air Canada Centre; Toronto	Host of the IIHF World Junior Championship; 2018	Succeeded by Rogers Arena; Vancouver and Save-On-Foods Memorial Centre; Victoria, British Columbia
Preceded by K.B. Willett Arena	Host of the Division III men's Frozen Four; 2020	Succeeded by Herb Brooks Arena
