= Terry Pegula =

American businessman and sports team owner (born 1951)

Terrence Pegula
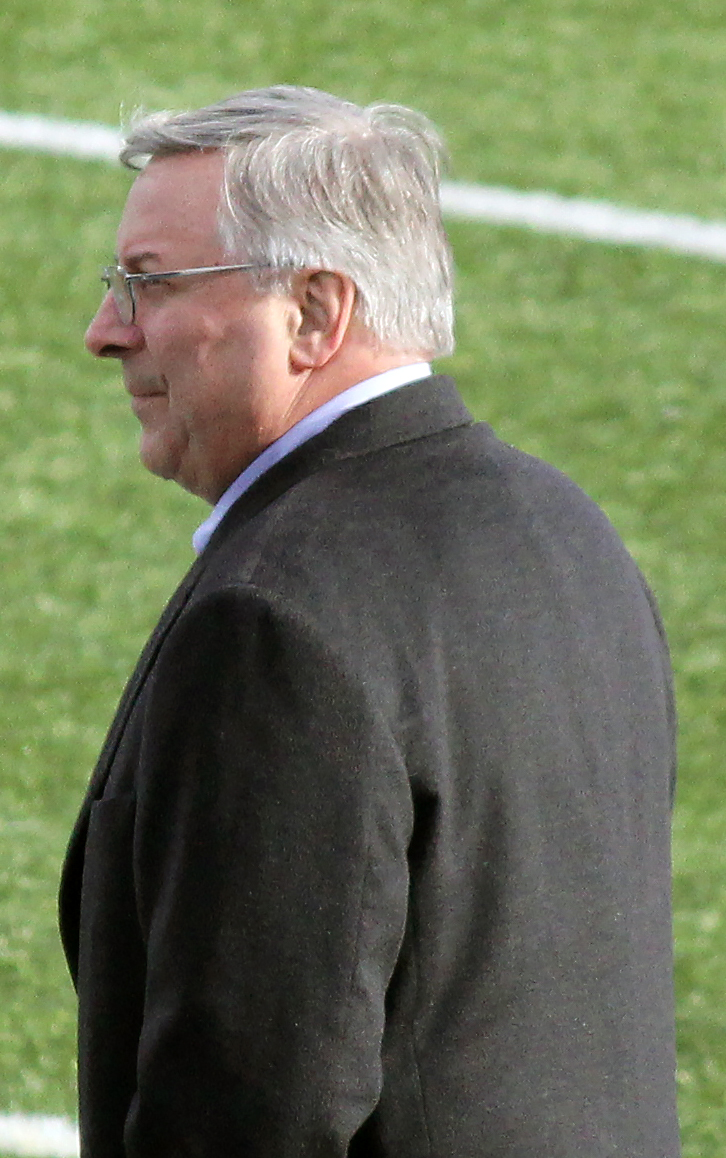
- Pegula in 2015
- Born: March 27, 1951 (age 75); Carbondale, Pennsylvania, U.S.
- Education: Pennsylvania State University (BS)
- Occupations: Petroleum engineer Professional sports team owner Real estate developer
- Known for: Owner/president of Buffalo Bills (NFL); Owner/president of Buffalo Sabres (NHL); Owner of Rochester Americans (AHL); Owner of Buffalo Bandits (NLL); Owner of Pegula Sports and Entertainment; Owner of JKLM Energy; Natural gas tycoon
- Spouses: Anne Shirley (divorced) Kim Kerr (m. 1993)
- Children: 5 (including Jessica)

Terrence Michael Pegula (born March 27, 1951) is an American billionaire businessman, sports team owner, and petroleum engineer.

He first developed his wealth by creating the company East Resources, which pioneered fracking in the Marcellus Formation. The majority of his wealth comes from sales of parts of the business to Royal Dutch Shell and American Energy Partners, LP. Pegula mantains interests in natural gas development, real estate, entertainment, and professional sports. His net worth is over US$7 billion.

He is most well known as the owner of the Buffalo Sabres of the National Hockey League (NHL) and, with a consortium of private equity firms and athletes, the Buffalo Bills of the National Football League (NFL). He is also the president of both franchises, alongside several smaller regional teams. He has also donated significant money to the sports programs at Pennsylvania State University and Houghton College. Other public donation records include political campaigns in Pennsylvania and New York.

== Early life ==
Pegula was born in Carbondale, Pennsylvania. His father, Myron Pegula, worked as a truck driver for a coal mining company, while his mother was from Montreal, Quebec, Canada. He is of Carpatho-Rusyn descent through his paternal grandparents, Andrew and Ana (Cheko) Pegula, who emigrated from Hanigovce, in present-day Slovakia.

He attended high school at Scranton Preparatory School. From there, he attended Penn State University, where he earned a bachelor's degree in petroleum and natural gas engineering. Beginning in 1985, he was based in Allegany, New York.

== Oil and gas development ==
After working for a time for Getty Oil and Felmont Oil Co., Pegula founded East Resources, a natural gas drilling company, with $7,500 from family and friends in 1983. It profited heavily upon discovery of deep layers of natural gas in the Marcellus Formation and application of the hydraulic fracturing ("fracking") recovery process.

Pegula eventually sold the Pennsylvania, New York, and Rocky Mountain assets of the company to Royal Dutch Shell for approximately $4.7 billion. He sold the Ohio and West Virginia assets of the company to American Energy Partners, LP for $1.75 billion in 2014. Pegula also owns Greater Rocky Mountain Regional Oil & Gas in Colorado and Wyoming, and JKLM Energy in Pennsylvania.

== Professional sports ==
=== Buffalo Sabres ===
In February 2011, Pegula purchased Hockey Western New York LLC (the holding company that owns the Buffalo Sabres and the Buffalo Bandits of the National Lacrosse League) from previous owners Tom Golisano, Larry Quinn, and Dan DiPofi for $189 million. Pegula's purchase made an immediate positive impact, with players, fans and alumni invigorated by his investment in the team, the then First Niagara Center and the building of Harborcenter across the street. Pegula was quoted as saying, "Starting today, the Buffalo Sabres' reason for existence, will be to win a Stanley Cup."

However, in the decade that followed, the Buffalo Sabres posted a 281–354–94 record and held the longest active NHL post-season drought. Pegula and his wife have been heavily criticized for meddling in the Sabres' hockey operations. Many fans and critics alike have attributed the team's firing of six head coaches and four general managers since 2013 to this, as well as other controversial moves such as the trades of Ryan O'Reilly, Jack Eichel, and Sam Reinhart, who would each go on to win a Stanley Cup with the St. Louis Blues, Vegas Golden Knights, and Florida Panthers, respectively.

=== Buffalo Bandits ===
Included in the Sabres purchase was their National Lacrosse League (NLL) counterpart, the Buffalo Bandits, which have won seven NLL championships. The Bandits won the NLL championship in 2023, giving Pegula his first championship under his ownership of the team. The Bandits would repeat as NLL champions in 2024, and would win a third consecutive league championship in 2025 which was the franchise's 7th overall championship.

=== Rochester Americans ===
In May 2011, Pegula began negotiations on behalf of the Sabres to re-purchase the Rochester Americans, which had served as the Sabres' American Hockey League affiliate from 1979 to 2008 (and had been owned by the Sabres from 1979 to 1996); the deal was completed in late June 2011. As part of the deal the Americans had to be split off from its NLL counterpart the Rochester Knighthawks since Pegula owned the Bandits due to ownership rules at the time. Along with the purchase of the Americans came upgrades to the team's arena, the Blue Cross Arena.

=== Buffalo Bills ===
On September 9, 2014, it was announced that Pegula had placed the winning binding bid to purchase the National Football League (NFL)'s Buffalo Bills, a team that was placed up for sale after the death of the original owner and team founder, Ralph Wilson. Pegula was a favorite among most local Bills fans and local politicians to buy the team due to his commitment to the Western New York area and local connections. He competed against future U.S. President Donald Trump and musician Jon Bon Jovi, the latter of whom was backed by principals of the Toronto-based Maple Leaf Sports and Entertainment, for purchase of the team. It was reported that the Pegulas made a $1.4 billion bid, all in cash. On September 17, 2014, the Pegulas were unanimously approved by the NFL's finance committee and were then scheduled to be presented at the NFL owners' meeting on October 8, 2014, for final owner approval; the Pegulas received unanimous approval from the league's owners on October 8 and closed the deal on October 10.

Pegula's first major order of business was to end the Bills Toronto Series, which he did in an agreement reached on December 3, 2014.

Upon the purchase of the Bills, Pegula and his wife Kim introduced One Buffalo, a marketing campaign which has since evolved into a brand used across all of their sports teams and associated products.

On March 28, 2022, it was announced that a deal had been reached between New York State, Erie County and the Pegulas for a 62,000 seat, $1.4 billion new stadium for the Bills in Orchard Park across the street from the current stadium. New York State will contribute $600 million in funding with Erie County contributing $250 million, the Pegulas contributing $350 million and the NFL via a G-4 loan $200 million. In addition the Pegulas signed the Bills to a 30-year ironclad lease. The stadium would be owned by New York State, a change from the current stadium which is owned by Erie County. New York committed to pay the maintenance and repair costs of the stadium. It was set to be the largest taxpayer contribution ever for a National Football League facility. The agreement was released four days before the New York state budget was due to be passed, making it hard for lawmakers to scrutinize the agreement. Critics of the agreement characterized it as corporate welfare.

On December 11, 2024, the NFL approved the sale of 20.6% of the Buffalo Bills franchise to a consortium of private equity firms, the first time private equity firms had been approved to own a stake in an NFL franchise. 10% of the franchise will be held by Arctos Partners, while the remaining 10.6% will be divided among executives at Acrew Capital, Bank of America, Gridiron Capital, Meritech Capital, and Accel-KKR, along with professional athletes Jozy Altidore, Vince Carter and Tracy McGrady, all of whom once played for Toronto-based clubs during their careers.

=== Buffalo Beauts ===
On December 21, 2017, it was announced that Pegula had acquired the Buffalo Beauts of the now-defunct league then known as the National Women's Hockey League and later as the Premier Hockey Federation. This made the Beauts the first NWHL team not owned by the league, the first professional women's hockey team in North America owned by the same person that owned the market's NHL team and got Pegula into women's hockey. Pegula divested the Beauts in 2019.

=== Rochester Knighthawks ===
In 2018, Pegula reached an agreement to purchase the intellectual property of the Rochester Knighthawks of the National Lacrosse League in autumn 2019. Curt Styres orchestrated the sale as he planned on moving his staff and roster to a new Halifax NLL team set to debut in the winter of 2020.

On June 23, 2025, it was announced that Pegula would divest ownership of the Knighthawks franchise. It was later announced on August 5, 2025 that the Seneca Nation of New York had purchased the team.

== Investments ==
=== Real estate ===
In 2012, he won a bid for the development rights to the Webster Block on Buffalo's waterfront. The $170 million hockey-themed LECOM Harborcenter building, which is anchored by the two rinks, a large parking garage, retail, restaurants and a hotel, mostly opened in November 2014 with the rinks, restaurants and parking garage fully completed and opened in August 2015 with the completion and opening of the hotel and retail. Pegula is also the operator of KeyBank Center and Blue Cross Arena. In 2017, Pegula purchased 79 Perry Street, near KeyBank Center and teamed up with Labatt USA to redevelop the building into a mixed use facility including a small test brewery called the "Labatt Brew House" and restaurant called "The Draft Room" as well as Labatt's U.S. headquarters, Pegula Sports and Entertainment's headquarters, and residential space.

=== Other investments ===
Pegula also owns a share of Black River Entertainment, an independent country music label. The label features such acts as Kelsea Ballerini, Kellie Pickler and Craig Morgan as well as the related Black River Publishing and Sound Stage Studio all under the Black River label based in Nashville, Tennessee.

Also under the Pegula umbrella is Impact Sports Performance, two high performance athletic training facilities which are based in Boca Raton, Florida and LECOM Harborcenter in Buffalo. Pegula owned 716 Food and Sport, a two floor sports themed restaurant which serves as the main business tenant of LECOM Harborcenter until he sold it to Southern Tier Brewing Company in 2021.

Through a partnership with Southern Tier Brewing Company, Pegula launched a "One Buffalo" branded craft beer that sells at all Pegula-owned properties and elsewhere in the region. The One Buffalo brand has also been extended to a flavor of Perry's Ice Cream (which already licensed Bills and Sabres themed flavors prior to Pegula's purchases of the teams) and premium cupcakes, both formulated by Pegula's wife, a pronounced fan of desserts.

In July 2022, Pegula established Bison Wealth, a back-office consulting service based in Atlanta, Georgia.

== Wealth ==
According to Bloomberg, Pegula had a net worth over $7 billion as of July 2021.

== College donations ==
=== Penn State hockey ===
An alumnus of Pennsylvania State University (Penn State), Pegula donated $102 million for the construction of the on-campus Pegula Ice Arena in 2010. As a result, the Penn State Nittany Lions, which had fielded club teams in both men's and women's hockey for years, would be able to transition both teams into NCAA Division I starting in the 2012–13 season.

This led to a domino effect across the men's college hockey landscape. Because six Big Ten universities now had Division I men's hockey programs (the minimum number of teams required under Big Ten bylaws for official conference sponsorship, and also the minimum required for a conference to be an automatic postseason qualifier), it was announced that Minnesota, Wisconsin, Michigan, Michigan State, and Ohio State would join Penn State in the Big Ten hockey conference starting in the 2013–2014 season. As a result, the original CCHA ceased operations, (Note: The CCHA would be revived in 2021 by seven programs that left the Western Collegiate Hockey Association.) with most schools (save for the three that joined the Big Ten and Notre Dame) joining the WCHA. Miami University and Western Michigan University, also previously in the CCHA, joined the upstart National Collegiate Hockey Conference along with former WCHA members St. Cloud State, Minnesota-Duluth, Denver, Colorado College, Nebraska-Omaha, and North Dakota. Ex-CCHA member Notre Dame joined Hockey East, which then recruited UConn from the Atlantic Hockey Association to begin play in Hockey East in 2014. After the dust settled, the ECAC was the only Division I conference not affected by the major conference realignment. Notre Dame subsequently left Hockey East in 2017 to join the Big Ten for hockey only.

Because Penn State's arrival gave the Big Ten only four varsity women's hockey programs, that conference was unable to add the sport, meaning that the women's hockey landscape did not undergo the radical changes that occurred in the men's game. The Penn State women's team settled in College Hockey America (CHA), a league that sponsored only women's hockey. (Note: Penn State now plays in Atlantic Hockey America, formed in 2024 when CHA merged with the men-only Atlantic Hockey Association.)

=== Houghton College ===
The Pegulas donated $12 million to Houghton College in Houghton, New York, of which Kim Pegula is an alumna, to build the Kerr-Pegula Athletic Complex. The facility includes new baseball and softball stadiums and a 115,000 square-foot field house with an eight-lane 200-meter track, five tennis courts, weight room, cardiac fitness center, and locker rooms. The new facility is mainly targeted toward Houghton College intercollegiate athletics, which recently moved up to Division III Athletics and the Empire 8 Conference. It opened on October 4, 2014.

== Personal life ==
He lives in Boca Raton, Florida, with his second wife, Kim Pegula (née Kerr), who grew up in Fairport, New York, and is a graduate of Houghton College. Kim was born in Seoul, South Korea, and at age 5, she was adopted in 1974 by Ralph and Marilyn Kerr. He has five children, two from a previous marriage to Anne Shirley (Michael and Laura), and three with Kim (Jessica, Kelly, and Matthew). Jessica Pegula is currently ranked number 3 on the Women's Tennis Association's Pro Circuit. Pegula owns a large yacht, christened Top Five.

In 2024, Laura Pegula, his daughter and longtime employee in Pegula's petroleum businesses, assumed a minority stake in the ownership of the Bills, following Kim being declared legally incapacitated in March 2023 following a June 2022 stroke; under the terms of the declaration, Kim was declared a ward in the custody of her husband and her assets transferred to a trust managed by Terry and by Bob Long, a longtime business partner of Pegula's.

== Political views ==
Though Pegula has been identified as a Republican, he does not speak publicly about his specific political views. Pegula and his wife have made political donations to politicians of both parties, generally to incumbents. In 2010, Pegula and his wife donated $305,000 to Republican Tom Corbett's campaign during the Pennsylvania governor's race; they were the largest contributors to the then Pennsylvania Attorney General. In New York, Pegula and his wife donated $25,000 to New York Governor Andrew Cuomo's campaign during the 2014 elections and also donated $12,000 to Buffalo mayor Byron Brown, $2,500 to U.S. senator Chuck Schumer, and $250 to state senator Tim Kennedy, all Democrats.

== Footnotes ==
Sporting positions
Preceded by Tom Golisano; Larry Quinn	Buffalo Sabres owner 2011–present	Incumbent
Preceded by Ralph Wilson	Buffalo Bills owner 2014–present Served alongside: Kim Pegula	Incumbent
