= Ralph Wilson =

American football executive (1918–2014)

- Wilson at his Hall of Fame induction in 2009

Personal information
- Born: October 17, 1918; Columbus, Ohio, U.S.
- Died: March 25, 2014 (aged 95); Grosse Pointe Shores, Michigan, U.S.

Career information
- College: University of Virginia; University of Michigan Law School

Career history
- Buffalo Bills (1960–2014); Owner

Awards and highlights
- 2× AFL champion (1964, 1965); Lamar Hunt Award (2008); Buffalo Bills Wall of Fame
- Military career
- Allegiance: United States
- Branch: United States Navy
- Service years: 1941–46
- Conflicts: World War II
- Pro Football Hall of Fame

Ralph Cookerly Wilson Jr. (October 17, 1918 – March 25, 2014) was an American businessman and sports executive. He was best known as the founder and owner of the Buffalo Bills, a team in the National Football League (NFL). He was one of the founding owners of the American Football League (AFL), the league with which the NFL merged in 1970, and was the last of the original AFL owners to own his team. At the time of his death he was the oldest owner in the NFL, at age 95. His 54 years of ownership was the third longest tenure by one owner in league history behind George Halas and Art Rooney. (Note: Halas owned the Bears for 63 years while Rooney owned the Steelers mostly uninterrupted for 55 years.) Wilson was inducted into the Pro Football Hall of Fame in 2009.

== Career ==
Born in Columbus, Ohio, Wilson grew up in Detroit, the son of salesman Ralph Wilson Sr. and his wife Edith Cole.

Choosing to go out of state to attend the University of Virginia (where he joined the Phi Delta Theta fraternity), Wilson returned to Michigan for graduate school at the University of Michigan Law School. He was a 1936 graduate of Detroit University School, now University Liggett School. Before Pearl Harbor, he enlisted in the U.S. Navy and served in the Atlantic and Pacific Theaters. After the war ended, he took over his father's insurance business and invested in Michigan area mines and factories. He eventually purchased several manufacturing outlets, construction firms, television and radio stations, and founded Ralph Wilson Industries.

Wilson got wind of Lamar Hunt's plans for a new league, the American Football League, to challenge the NFL. He tried to put together a team in Miami, but was turned down. His next choice was Buffalo, where the AFL's first choice of owner, Pat McGroder, had declined to start a team. In September 1959, Wilson sent Hunt a telegram with the words, "Count me in with Buffalo.” He named his new team the Bills, after a previous team that had played in the All-America Football Conference from 1946 to 1949. On October 28, 1959, the Buffalo Bills officially became the seventh AFL team. Wilson made professional football a resounding success in a "small market", signing such stars as Cookie Gilchrist, Jack Kemp, and Tom Sestak and Hall of Famers Billy Shaw and O. J. Simpson.

He was a guiding force in AFL policies that ensured success, such as gate and television revenue sharing. As one of only three AFL owners to be on relatively solid financial ground (along with Hunt and Houston Oilers owner Bud Adams), Wilson lent the financially troubled Oakland Raiders $400,000 and was also willing to lend money to Billy Sullivan of the New England Patriots. Wilson helped keep those franchises afloat, likely saving the entire league from folding (the AFL was unique among professional football leagues in that not a single AFL franchise folded in its history). In November 1963, Wilson along with then Raiders general manager Al Davis lobbied successfully to have AFL games postponed the Sunday after President John F. Kennedy's assassination; NFL games were played as scheduled.

Wilson was most concerned about his team's financial solvency and was largely indifferent to the Bills' on-field success; O. J. Simpson later noted of his contract negotiations with the Bills that when Simpson's agent told Wilson of Simpson's potential to make the team a championship contender, Wilson shot back "What good would a championship do me? All that means is everybody wants a raise."

In 1989, after league commissioner Pete Rozelle announced his retirement, Wilson was on the six-member committee who was tasked with nominating potential candidates for the open position. Wilson's nominee, his former quarterback Jack Kemp, declined to pursue the post, as he had already taken a position in the U.S. Cabinet. (The job ultimately went to league attorney Paul Tagliabue.)

After the original naming rights deal on the Bills' Orchard Park stadium expired in 1998, the facility's name was changed from Rich Stadium to Ralph Wilson Stadium; it would not receive a new naming rights deal until 2016, after his death and the subsequent sale of the team. According to an article on msn.com, Wilson, described as "stubborn", turned down numerous naming rights deals for the stadium.

Wilson was one of the league's most outspoken owners, even near the end of his life. Wilson voted against the Cleveland Browns' relocation to Baltimore in 1995. He publicly rebuked NFL Commissioner Paul Tagliabue in an open letter in 1998 over league policy, which disallowed criticism of referees, after poor officiating had a direct impact on a Bills loss that season. He was one of two owners (the Cincinnati Bengals' Mike Brown being the other) to oppose the league's former (pre-2011) collective bargaining agreement. (Wilson and Brown were commended for their foresight when the agreement later led to the 2011 NFL Lockout.) He also negotiated a deal to have his team play home games in Toronto from 2008 until 2014.

Wilson retired from the position of president in 2001, giving operational control to general manager Tom Donahoe; Wilson retook control of the team's operations in 2006. Wilson again retired as team president, this time surrendering all control of the team's operations to Russ Brandon, on January 1, 2013. He continued to consult with Brandon on team and league operations up until his death.

== Personal life ==
Wilson maintained a permanent residence in Grosse Pointe Shores, Michigan with his wife, Mary McLean, whom he met in 1989. He had three daughters from his first marriage to Janet McGregor Wilson, two of whom became involved in team business: Linda Wilson Bogdan (1948–2009), Pro Football's first female scout, was the franchise's Corporate Vice President until her death. Another daughter, Christy Wilson Hofmann, served as a consultant in the area of merchandising. The third daughter, Edith Wilson (1951–2020) was never involved with the franchise. The highest ranking relative in the organization was Mary Owen, Wilson's niece, who served as Vice President of Strategic Planning until the team was sold. Wilson and his first wife divorced in 1970 after 26 years of marriage and shortly after their youngest daughter, Edith, turned 19.

Beginning in the 1990s, Wilson maintained a small, but very valuable, art collection, including works by Claude Monet, Édouard Manet and Alfred Sisley; this collection was valued in the tens of millions of dollars.

Wilson was a 1992 inductee of the Greater Buffalo Sports Hall of Fame. He was a 33rd degree Scottish Rite Freemason.

=== Declining health and death ===
Wilson broke his hip in a fall at his home in July 2011, causing him to miss the Bills' home opener for the first time in franchise history. The injury resulted in him needing to use a wheelchair. He issued a statement saying that he was undergoing physical therapy and hoped to attend at least one game during the season. Wilson also stated that he was "very surprised" by the team's 41–7 victory over Kansas City in week 1. He was hospitalized in August and early September 2012 with an unspecified infection and missed attending games in the entire 2012 season. In April 2013, Wilson was reported as "doing really well," with a statement that he hoped to make the 2013 home opener.

Wilson died at his home on March 25, 2014, of natural causes at the age of 95. His estate held the franchise in trust until its sale to Buffalo Sabres owners Terry and Kim Pegula in September 2014. The proceeds from the sale were used to form an endowment for the Ralph C. Wilson Jr. Foundation, which funds charitable causes in the Buffalo and Detroit areas, in accordance with Wilson's instructions for the money set forth prior to his death. The donation amounted to $1.2 billion and would be given away over the next two decades. The organization was overseen for a few months by his niece Mary Owen until its sale to the Pegulas was completed on October 8, 2014.

== Pro Football Hall of Fame ==
On January 31, 2009, Wilson was elected to the Pro Football Hall of Fame along with former Buffalo Bills defensive end Bruce Smith. The Hall of Fame game, played the day after the 2009 inductions, strayed from the usual AFC–NFC format and instead was contested by two original American Football League teams: the Buffalo Bills and the Tennessee Titans (formerly the Houston Oilers). This matchup was announced after Wilson was elected. Like Wilson, Titans owner Bud Adams was the only owner his team had ever had, and the two were the only living members of the "Foolish Club", the founders of the original eight AFL teams. Wilson and Adams are two of only four men who have owned a professional football franchise continuously for fifty years (George Halas, who owned the Chicago Bears from 1920 until his death in 1983, is the third, and William Clay Ford Sr., Wilson's neighbor, who owned the Detroit Lions from 1961 to 2014, is the fourth).

The Hall of Fame game on Sunday, August 9, was a kickoff to the 2009 season, which would have been the 50th season of play for the AFL, if the NFL had not merged with it. Wilson was officially inducted into the Pro Football Hall of Fame on Saturday, August 8, 2009, with ESPN icon Chris Berman acting as his "presenter". Wilson was scheduled to receive his Hall of Fame ring in a halftime ceremony during the Bills game against the Cleveland Browns on October 11, 2009. However, Wilson cancelled the event at the last moment, without notifying the press or fans, and no explanation was given. It was widely speculated that Wilson cancelled the event out of fear of being booed by Bills fans for the team's chronic poor performance on the field and a series of highly unpopular managerial decisions. He was eventually presented with the ring on November 1.

Wilson donated US$2.5 million to the construction of a "Pro Football Research and Preservation Center" at the Hall of Fame; the facility was named in Wilson's honor on August 13, 2012.

== Thoroughbred racing ==
Wilson was also involved for a number of years in the sport of Thoroughbred horse racing both as a breeder and as an owner in France and the United States. He bred Santa Anita Derby winner Jim French, as well as two-year-old European superstar Arazi, winner of the 1991 Breeders' Cup Juvenile and European Horse of the Year. Another horse, Outta Here, raced in the 2003 Kentucky Derby and finished in seventh place.

== Philanthropy ==
- The Ralph C. Wilson Jr. School of Education, St. John Fisher University, Rochester, New York.
- The Mary & Ralph Wilson Jr. Hospice Inpatient Unit of Hospice Buffalo is named after him.
- The Wilson Building, Cheektowaga, New York.
- Ralph C. Wilson Jr. Athletic Field at the NFL/Youth Education Town-Boys & Girls Club at the Dick & Sandy Dauch Campus in Detroit, Michigan.
- Ralph C Wilson Jr. Foundation:
  - Two $100 million posthumous donations, in honor of Wilson's 100th birthday, to the park systems in Buffalo and Detroit respectively; the former is the largest philanthropic donation in Western New York history
  - $6 million grant to the Explore & More Children's Museum in Canalside, Buffalo, which was renamed after Wilson.

Sporting positions
New creation	Buffalo Bills owner 1959–2014	Succeeded by Terry Pegula; Kim Pegula
