= Kim Pegula =

American businesswoman (born 1969)

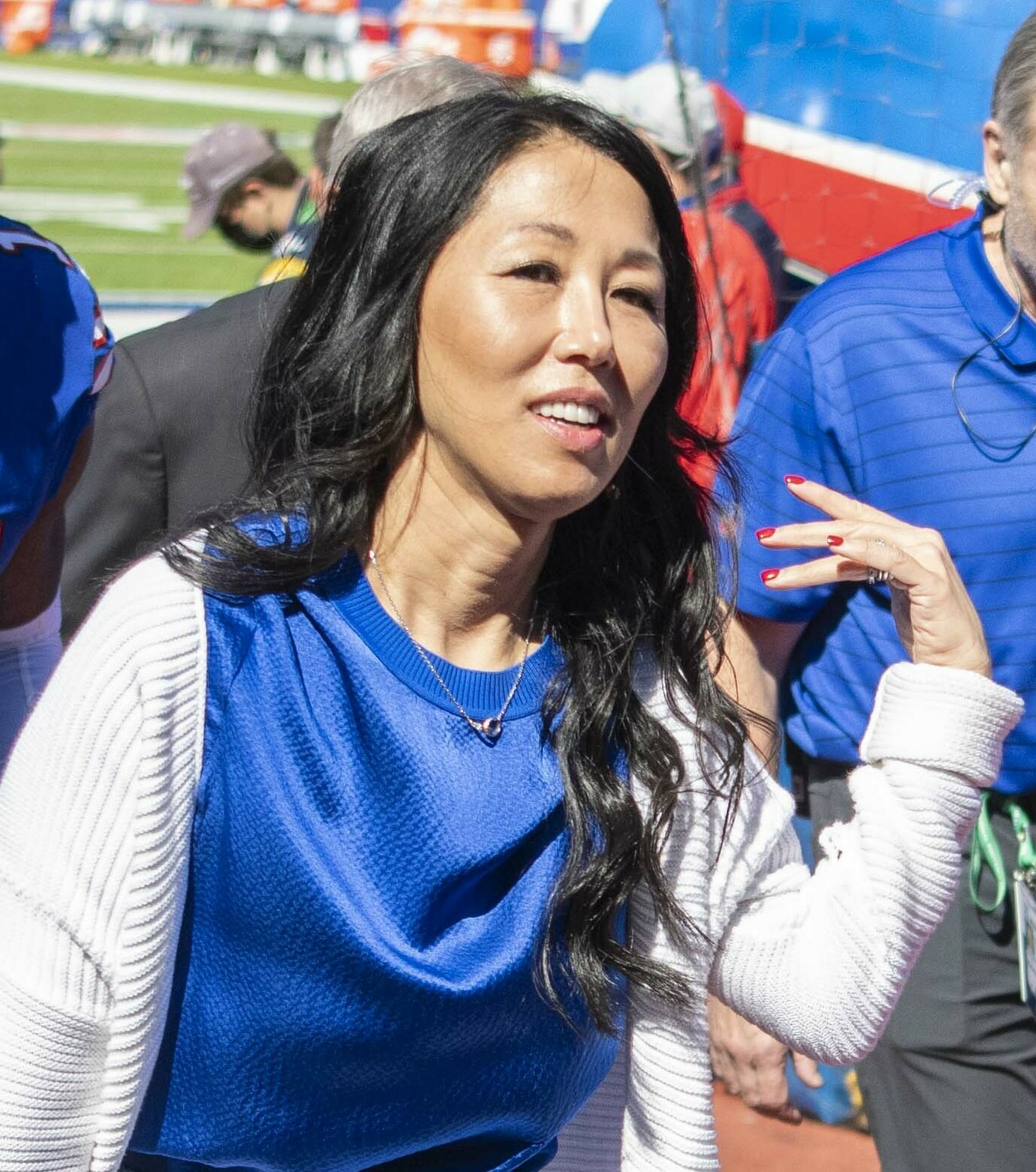
- Pegula in 2021
- Born: Kim S. Kerr; June 7, 1969 (age 57); Seoul, South Korea
- Citizenship: United States
- Education: Houghton College
- Known for: Owner of the Buffalo Bills, President/CEO of Pegula Sports and Entertainment
- Spouse: Terry Pegula (m. 1993)
- Children: 3 (including Jessica Pegula)

Kim S. Pegula (née Kerr; born June 7, 1969) is a South Korean–born American former businesswoman and the wife of American multibillionaire Terry Pegula. She was the president of Pegula Sports and Entertainment, the holding company that managed the Buffalo Bills of the National Football League and the Buffalo Sabres of the National Hockey League, in addition to several other minor league sports teams and entertainment assets. By extension she was the president of several teams under Pegula Sports and Entertainment, including the Bills and Sabres and Buffalo Bandits; Pegula, Shahid Khan, and Zygi Wilf were the only three NFL team owners who were not born in the United States. Pegula Sports and Entertainment was dissolved in 2023, following an incapacitating stroke she suffered the year prior.

== Early life ==
Pegula was born on June 7, 1969, in Seoul, South Korea. She reportedly has no recollection of her birth name and no record of her biological parents nor any account of her life in South Korea, only her date of birth, a secondhand account of being abandoned in the streets of Seoul at the age of five, and a DNA test that showed that one of her parents was likely Japanese. She was brought to the United States and was adopted by Ralph and Marilyn Kerr on December 30, 1974. She grew up with her adopted family in Fairport, New York, a suburb of Rochester. Pegula participated in cheerleading and the school band, playing bassoon. After following her brothers' footsteps in enrolling at Houghton College, she and a roommate made plans to venture to Alaska to work near a fishing camp upon hearing there was money to be made. Unable to afford the fare, she applied for work at the Old Library Restaurant in Olean, New York; while interviewing for a waitressing gig, she met Terry Pegula who was dining at the restaurant. In 1991, Terry offered her a job at his natural gas company and they eventually entered a relationship; they married in 1993.

== Career ==
Pegula was involved in her husband's company, East Resources, from 1991 to its sale in 2010. Shortly afterwards, the Pegulas purchased the Buffalo Sabres and its two affiliated teams, the Buffalo Bandits of the NLL and the Rochester Americans of the AHL. She influenced the planning and construction of LECOM Harborcenter, a mixed-use development next to the Sabres' arena and part of the revitalization of downtown Buffalo. After the 2014 death of longtime Buffalo Bills owner Ralph Wilson, the football team was put up for sale. The Pegulas competed with Donald Trump and also a consortium of rock singer Jon Bon Jovi and key people in Toronto-based Maple Leaf Sports and Entertainment for the team. The Pegulas won with an NFL record $1.4 billion all-cash bid.

Following the acquisition Kim and Terry Pegula reorganized their sports franchises, along with record label Black River Entertainment into a new company, Pegula Sports and Entertainment. She helped coin the term "One Buffalo" and is also involved with the NFL Foundation. The Pegulas have also donated significant amounts of money to their alma maters, including $12 million to Houghton College, which allowed it to build a new athletics complex and transition to NCAA Division III. A fan of desserts, Pegula helped formulate "One Buffalo" branded premium ice cream and cupcake products. Since its formation Pegula Sports and Entertainment, with Kim Pegula as its president and CEO, has made several acquisitions of property in Buffalo and launched a regional sports network, MSG Western New York. The company also acquired two more professional sports teams, the Buffalo Beauts of the National Women's Hockey League (until divesting of the team a year later) and the Rochester Knighthawks of the National Lacrosse League.

In March 2018, Pegula was named to the National Football League's business ventures committee, replacing Russ Brandon. Pegula served on the NFL's Super Bowl and major-event advisory committee.

On May 1, 2018, after the abrupt resignation of Brandon as president of Pegula Sports and Entertainment as well as the Bills and Sabres, Pegula was installed as president over all of the Pegula Sports and Entertainment properties. She became the first female team president in the history of both the NFL and NHL when she became president of the Bills and Sabres franchises. Pegula remained president of the organization and its properties until its dissolution in 2023, which occurred after a major health incident in 2022 that left her unable to fulfill her duties. Her husband, Terry, took up Kim's president position with the Bills and Sabres, which like all other former PSE properties, would be managed separately.

Pegula is also one of a handful of female NFL owners, including Sheila Ford Hamp (Detroit Lions), Amy Adams Strunk (Tennessee Titans), Denise DeBartolo York (San Francisco 49ers), Gayle Benson (New Orleans Saints), Janice McNair (Houston Texans), and Dee Haslam (Cleveland Browns).

== Personal life ==
Kim and Terry Pegula have three children, Kelly, Matthew, and Jessica, who is a professional tennis player, currently ranked 3rd in the world. Kim has two stepchildren, Michael and Laura, from Terry's previous marriage. The Pegulas have homes in East Aurora, New York, and Boca Raton, Florida.

=== Cardiac arrest ===
In June 2022, Pegula was hospitalized in an intensive care unit in Boca Raton for reasons the family would not disclose. Pegula's daughter Jessica later stated that her mother's condition had improved by the time of Jessica's appearance at the 2022 Wimbledon Championships and was rehabilitating. On February 7, 2023, Jessica Pegula revealed in a Players' Tribune article that Kim Pegula's hospitalization was due to her having gone into cardiac arrest, which progressed into a "brain injury" leading to "significant expressive aphasia and significant memory issues" due to the prolonged lack of oxygen to her brain. Jessica Pegula credited her sister, Kelly, for saving their mother's life as she had taken a CPR class just months prior.

On March 23, 2023, Pegula was legally declared incapacitated. Her assets were placed into a trust managed by Terry and his longtime business partner Bob Long, while her stepdaughter Laura Pegula assumed Kim's role as Bills co-owner in early 2024. Private equity investors purchased a substantial portion of Kim's stake in December. Despite this, the Bills and Sabres both continue to list Kim Pegula as a co-owner on their websites, with her biography on the Bills' site stating that she is "undergoing long-term physical and occupational therapy". In late July 2023, she attended a training camp practice of the Buffalo Bills, which was her first public appearance in 14 months. A year later in July 2024, she publicly took steps outside her vehicle, assisted by her husband, and broke down the huddle following the Bills' training camp practice that day.

Sporting positions
Preceded by Ralph Wilson	Buffalo Bills owner 2014–present Served alongside: Terry Pegula	Incumbent
