= Larry Quinn (ice hockey) =

American ice hockey executive

Member-at-large of the Buffalo Public Schools Board of Education
- In office July 1, 2014 – June 30, 2019
- Preceded by: Florence Johnson
- Succeeded by: Terrance L. Heard

Personal details
- Born: 1952 (age 73–74)
- Occupation: Real estate developer Former President of the Buffalo Sabres; Former Buffalo Public Schools Board of Education Member

Larry Quinn (born c. 1952) is an American ice hockey executive, businessman and politician, best known for his involvement with the Buffalo Sabres of the NHL. Quinn has had two stints in the Sabres organization, the first in the 1990s as team president, and the second in the mid-to-late 2000s as managing partner, minority owner, and de facto president. Quinn, in 2014, won election to Buffalo Public Schools' board of education.

== Buffalo Sabres ==
Quinn first joined the team as president in the 1990s and was responsible for hiring general manager Darcy Regier in 1997, after he had fired then-GM John Muckler. After Quinn and Regier allowed coach Ted Nolan to leave after the end of his contract, they hired Lindy Ruff as head coach. Both Regier and Ruff would stay with the team until their respective dismissals in 2013. Quinn assisted then-owners Northrup R. Knox and Seymour H. Knox III in securing the construction of what is now the KeyBank Center and the abandonment of Buffalo Memorial Auditorium. Quinn first served as president and CEO of the Sabres from November 1, 1996 to April 9, 1998. The Sabres compiled a record of 69 wins, 48 losses and 27 ties and captured the Northeast division title in 1997 and advanced to the conference finals in 1998.

Quinn was let go in 1998 as John Rigas took over the franchise. Four years later, the Adelphia Communications scandal led to the league taking over the team. Quinn associated himself with the prospective ownership group led by Tom Golisano, initially serving as a consultant. When investor Hormoz Mansouri left the ownership group, Quinn stepped in and was rewarded with a minority stake in the franchise. When Golisano closed on his purchase of the team on March 12, 2004, Quinn became managing partner and CEO, returning to his old job as operating head of the franchise. He also served as Golisano's representative in Buffalo.

Quinn resigned on February 22, 2011 when the team was purchased by Terry Pegula. The Sabres compiled a record 300 wins, 200 losses, 5 ties and 57 overtime losses and won the Presidents trophy in 2007 and the northeast division title in 2007 and 2010. The Sabres advanced to the Eastern Conference Finals in 2006 and 2007.

Quinn oversaw the first NHL Winter Classic held on January 1, 2008 at Ralph Wilson Stadium.

Ted Black assumed Quinn's non-hockey duties upon Pegula's assumption of ownership; the title of President was left vacant until Pat LaFontaine's hiring in November 2013.

== Business and political ventures ==
A real estate developer by trade, Quinn served as vice chairman of the Erie Canal Harbor Development Corporation. He was a significant advocate of the proposed, but ultimately unsuccessful, bid to bring a Bass Pro Shops supercenter to downtown Buffalo. Quinn left the ECHDC upon leaving the Sabres organization in 2011. Although Quinn initially left Western New York after his second tenure with the Sabres, he returned by February 2014 to announce his intent to run for Buffalo Public Schools' board of education. He won that race, running on an alliance with sitting board member Carl Paladino.

Larry's son, Matt Quinn, is a television producer who works on political campaigns.

Educational offices
Preceded by Florence Johnson	Member-at-large of the Buffalo Public Schools; Board of Education; 2014 - 2019	Succeeded by Terrance L. Heard
