= Perry's Ice Cream =

American ice cream company

- Type: Private
- Industry: Ice cream, frozen yogurt, sorbet
- Founded: 1918
- Headquarters: Akron, New York, United States
- Area served: New York, Ohio, Pennsylvania, Maryland
- Key people: Thomas C. Perry
- Products: Ice cream, novelties
- Services: Ice cream manufacturer and distributor
- Number of employees: 370
- Website: www.perrysicecream.com

Perry's Ice Cream is an ice cream manufacturer located in Akron, New York. Perry's sells and distributes primarily to New York, Western Pennsylvania, New England, and Northeast Ohio.

== History ==
Perry's Ice Cream was founded in 1918 by H. Morton Perry as Perry's Dairy, a dairy delivery business. The business would later supply ice cream to Akron High School starting in 1932. In 1940 H. Morton Perry and his son, Marlo, were able to purchase a Buffalo ice cream maker and began to expand their distribution into Akron.

Thomas C. Perry, Marlo's son, became CEO and president of the company in 1982, and chairman of the board in 1988, after his father died.

In 1997 the company released the flavor "Zero Visibility" to celebrate the 20th anniversary of the Blizzard of 1977.

As of 2000, the company's CEO and President is Robert Denning, Thomas C. Perry's Son-in-Law.

In 2016 the company exceeded $100 million in revenue for the first time ever.

In 2018 Perry's celebrated its 100th anniversary. To celebrate, it re-released four retro flavors. The company recorded $100 million in sales for the year.

In 2019 the company launched Perry's Oats Cream, an oat milk based product line. That same year, it expanded distribution to North Carolina.

== Present day ==
As of 2022 the company has 370 employees. It is a fourth generation family-owned and operated business.

The company claims to have over 130 flavors of ice cream, sherbet, and frozen yogurt. It has partnered with several sports teams, including the Buffalo Bills, Buffalo Sabres, Cleveland Guardians, and Columbus Blue Jackets, to produce novelty ice cream flavors. Nearly all milk used comes from dairy farms in western New York.

== Awards ==
- 2019: Plant of the Year, Dairy Food Magazine
