= Second String =

2002 sports film

Second String is a direct-to-TV film directed by Robert Lieberman which originally aired in 2002 on TNT. The plot is about the Buffalo Bills football team who find its first string (led by real-life Bills quarterback Doug Flutie, who had left the team by the time the film was released) out for a month after a food poisoning incident, leading the team's head coach, "Chuck Dichter" (portrayed by Jon Voight), to hire an insurance salesman and former college quarterback named Dan Heller (played by Gil Bellows) as the team's backup quarterback. Teri Polo also appeared as Heller's wife; Flutie, Mike Ditka, Chris Berman, Van Miller, Bills cornerback Donovan Greer and Ken "Pinto Ron" Johnson appear as themselves. The film received praise for having been shot in genuine stadiums. Reviewer Chuck Finder drew parallels between the character of Dan Heller and former Pittsburgh Steelers backup quarterback Tommy Maddox.

== See also ==
- List of American football films
