= Edward Abramoski =

American athletic trainer (1933–2022)

- Born: Edward Raymond Abramoski; November 5, 1933; Erie, Pennsylvania, U.S.
- Died: June 24, 2022 (aged 88)
- Other names: Abe, Eddie
- Occupation: Athletic trainer
- Years active: 1960–1997
- Organization: Buffalo Bills

Edward Raymond "Abe" Abramoski (November 5, 1933 – June 24, 2022) was an American athletic trainer, known for serving as the head athletic trainer for the Buffalo Bills in the American Football League (AFL) and the National Football League (NFL) for a total of 37 years. His service to the team and the city of Buffalo, New York, was formally recognized in 1999 with the inclusion of his name on the Wall of Fame at Ralph Wilson Stadium.

== Career ==
Abramoski initially played football at his high school in Erie, Pennsylvania, and received a football scholarship to Purdue University, but had to stop playing in his sophomore season due to a back injury. It was during this time that he started studying to become an athletic trainer. Abramoski later began working as an athletic trainer for the Buffalo Bills in 1959 and prior to his stint in Buffalo, Abramoski also served as an athletic trainer for the University of Detroit, the Detroit Lions, and the United States Military Academy. He has worked as an assistant trainer at West Point and at age 21, became the youngest Division I head trainer in the nation when he took on the position at the University of Detroit. In 1990 and again in 1994, Abramoski received the Buffalo Bills Alumni Association Appreciation Award, and was inducted into the NATA Hall of Fame in 1986, the Greater Buffalo Sports Hall of Fame in 1996, and the Professional Football Athletic Trainers Society (PFATS) Hall of Fame in 2026. He is also a member of the Niagara Frontier for Distinguished Achievements in Sports and frequently volunteered for the New York State Special Olympics. Abramoski retired from his position in 1996 and in 1999 had his name placed on the Buffalo Bills Wall of Fame.

Abramoski was posthumously recognized by the Pro Football Hall of Fame in the Athletic Trainers category at the 2026 Awards of Excellence.

== Personal life ==
Abramoski was raised in Erie, Pennsylvania, with four sisters and married his wife Patricia Abramoski (née Casey) in Louisville, Kentucky, on June 18, 1960. They had five children together and several grandchildren. Abramoski became a member of the Buffalo Homing Pigeon Association in 1962 and has attended multiple national pigeon conventions. In 2007, Abramoski received the International Federation Person of the Year. In 2002, he co-wrote The Tale of the Tape: A History of the Buffalo Bills from the Inside, a non-fiction book detailing his time with the Buffalo Bills. Abramoski donated his portion of the proceeds from the book to the Shaken Baby Syndrome Program at Children's Hospital of Buffalo in honor of an adopted grandson that suffered from shaken baby syndrome.

Abramoski died on June 24, 2022.

== Bibliography ==
- The Tale of the Tape: A History of the Buffalo Bills from the Inside (2002, with Milt Northrop)
