= Billy Buffalo =

Mascot for the NFL's Buffalo Bills

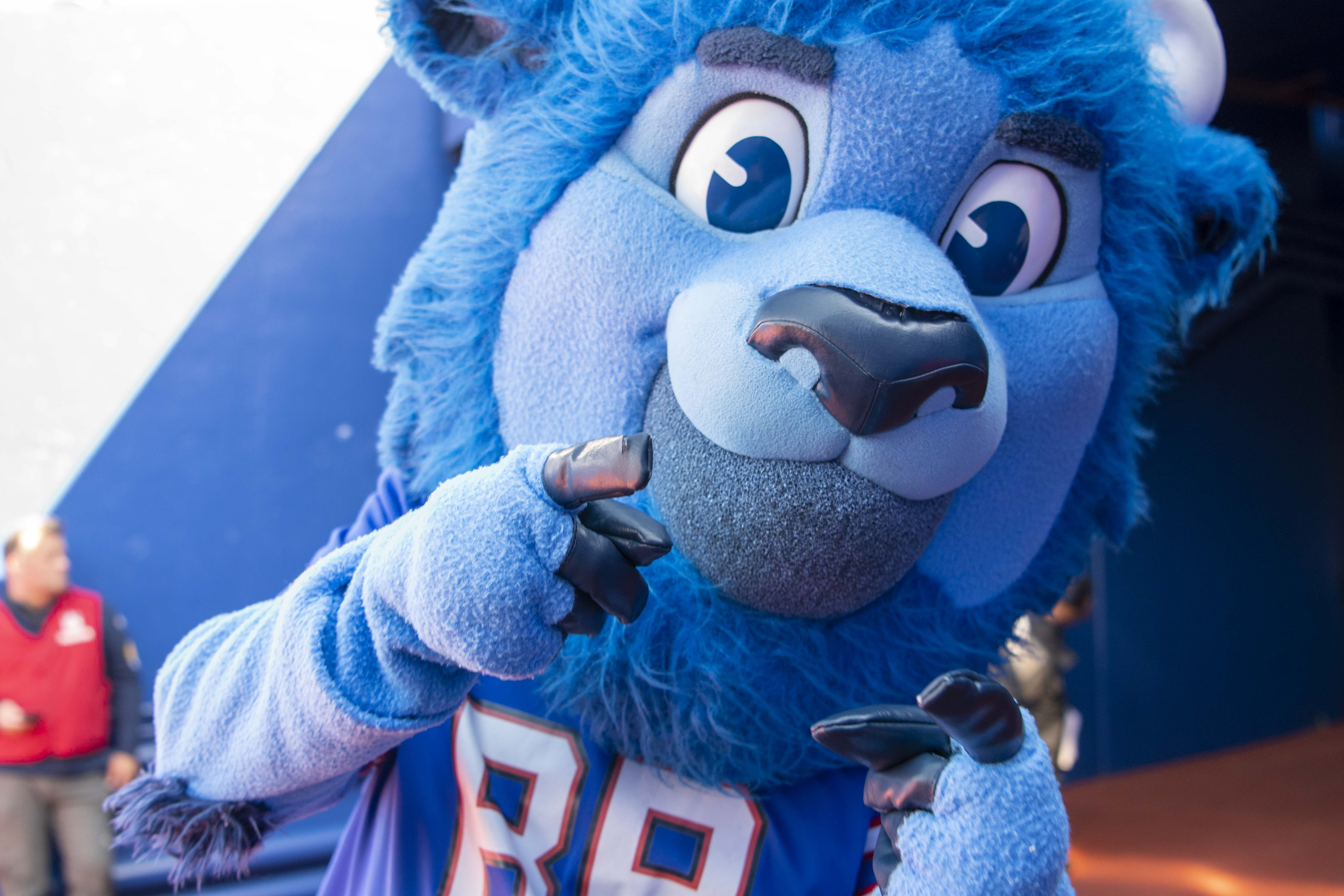
Billy Buffalo during one of the 2021 home games

William "Billy" the Buffalo (debuted 2000 in Orchard Park, New York) is the official mascot of the NFL's Buffalo Bills. He is an 8-foot-tall (2.4 m) blue American bison and became the team's full-time mascot in 2000. He wears the uniform "number" BB (which are his initials).

An unofficial predecessor to Billy appeared at Bills games between 1974 and 1976. This mascot, which consisted of two men in a buffalo suit, had originated when the creators breached security at the Bills' Monday Night Football game and continued to make appearances until Ralph Wilson ordered the character not to be allowed in again. This mascot would make occasional appearances in NFL Films documentaries, being largely treated as an official mascot.

Billy Buffalo was redesigned in 2018, with fan reception to the mascot's "makeover" being mixed. Jason Ballock, who wore the costume from 2006 to 2011, praised the design as more streamlined and "kid friendly".
