= Ken "Pinto Ron" Johnson =

Buffalo Bills superfan (born 1957)

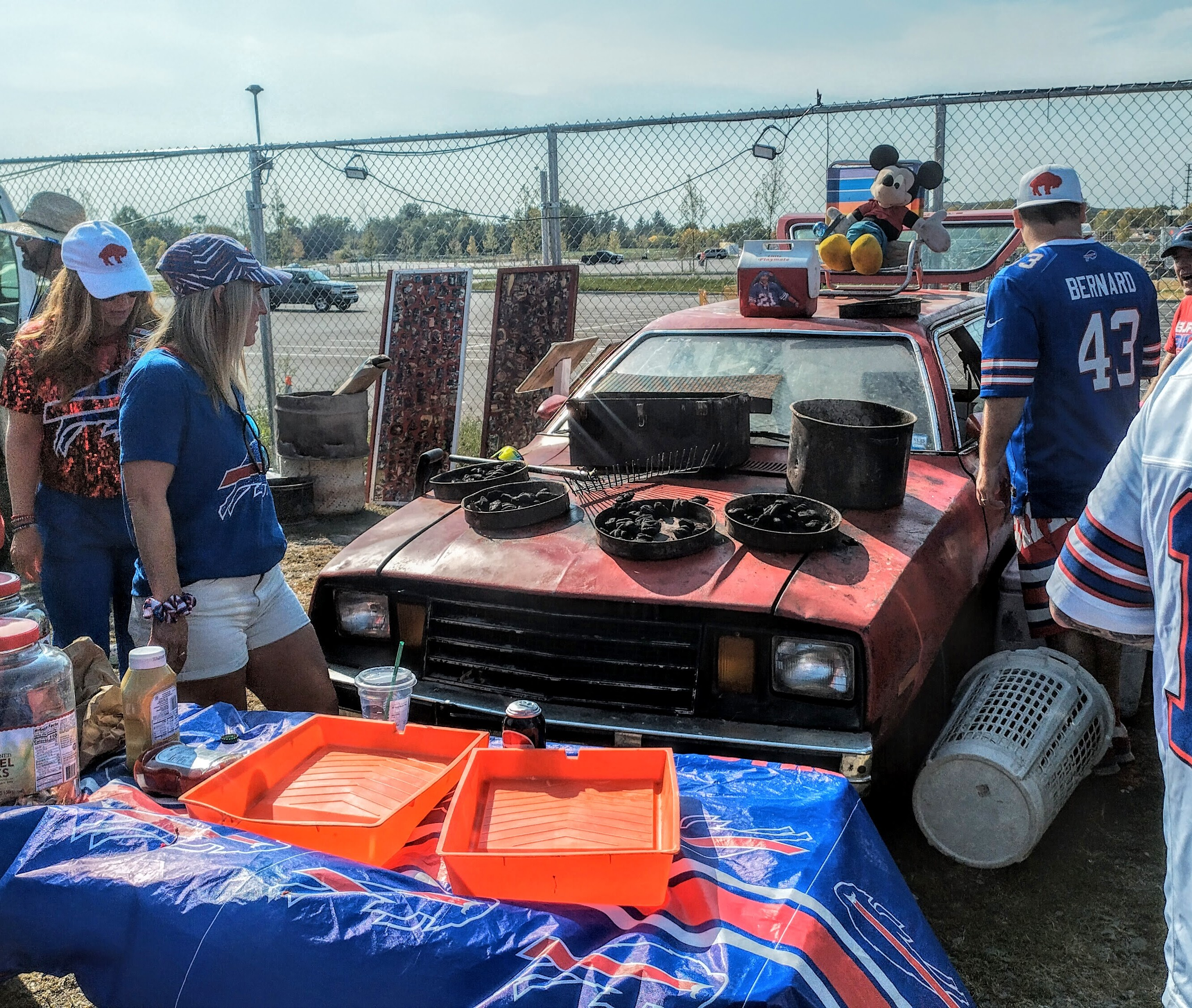
Johnson's Ford Pinto at a 2025 Buffalo Bills tailgate

Ken Johnson, better known as "Pinto Ron", (born 1957) is a Buffalo Bills superfan known for attending every single Bills home and away game since 1994. and hosting the "Red Pinto Tailgate Party" since 1989.

From Rochester, New York, Johnson is a retired software engineer. He is known for his red Ford Pinto and antics cooking food on his car hood in a variety of objects such as a shovel and army helmet; furthermore, he holds a tradition of being doused in ketchup and mustard.

He originally held his tailgate party near the Buffalo Bills Fieldhouse in a lot owned by the Bills, however the National Football League (NFL) shut his tailgate down, primarily for concerns over his famous “bowling ball shots” in 2010. Soon after, Johnson moved his tailgate party to the infamous "Hammer’s Lot" next to the stadium where the NFL has no jurisdiction and was able to resume serving bowling ball shots and has remained there ever since.

He has been featured in multiple NFL Films, as well as the made-for-TV movie Second String. and a 5-part documentary on the infamous Bills Mafia titled "Just One Before I Die" exclusively on the streaming service, Tubi.

Johnson, as well as most fans and media do not count the 2020 COVID-19 pandemic shutdown against is consecutive game record. Johnson has attended over 500 consecutive Bills games.

During the filming of the previously mentioned documentary, Johnson stated that 2026 could possibly be his final season attending every game and hosting his party, as he is approaching 70 years of age and has had serious health issues in recent years.
