= Buffalo Bills =

NFL team in Orchard Park, New York

- Current season
| Logo | Wordmark |
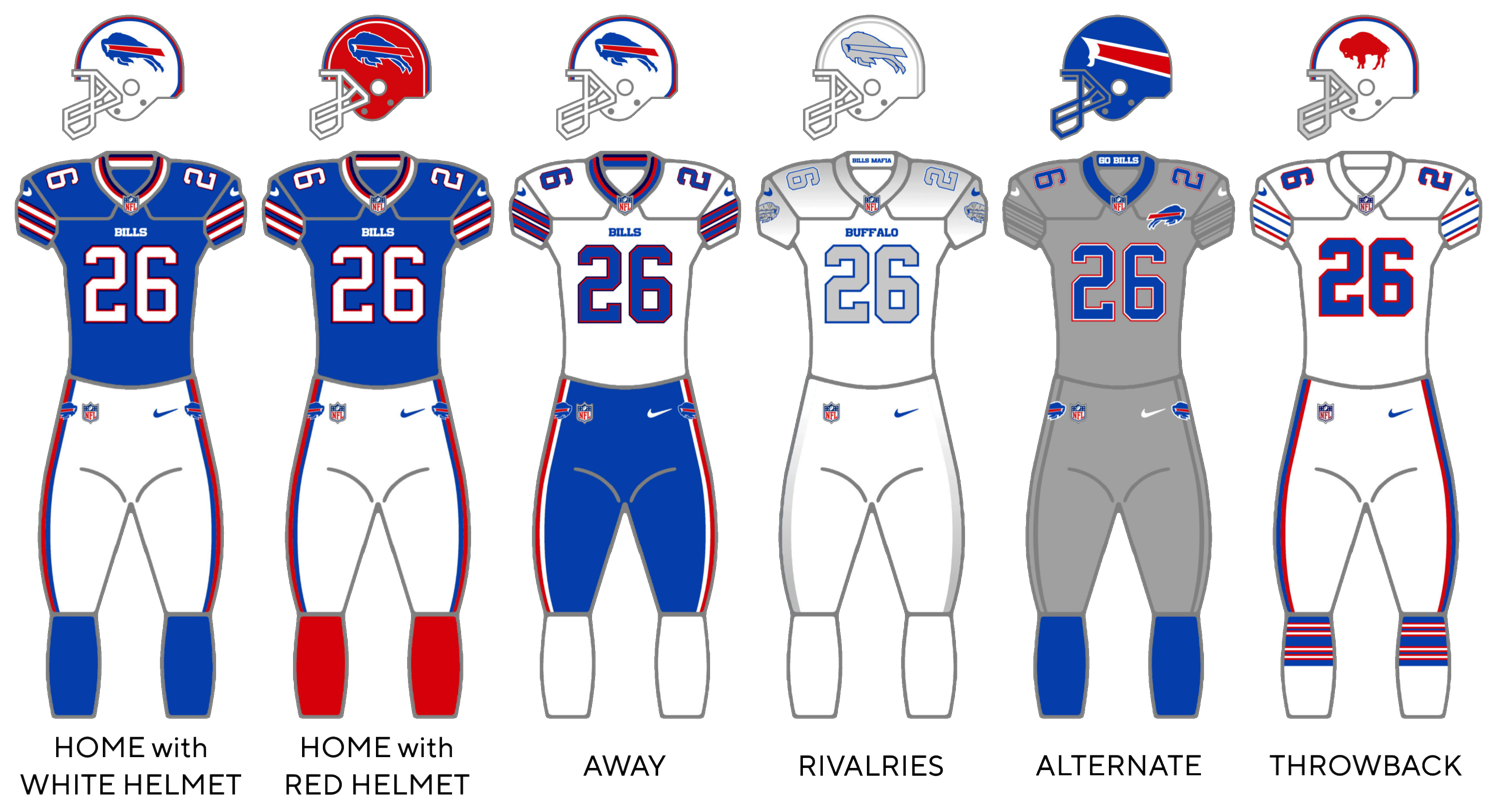
- Uniforms

General information
- Founded: October 28, 1959; 67 years ago
- Stadium: Highmark Stadium; Orchard Park, New York
- Headquartered: ADPRO Sports Training Center, Orchard Park, New York
- Colors: Royal blue, red, white, navy blue
- Fight songs: "Shout"; "Mr. Brightside" (4th quarter)
- Mascot: Billy Buffalo
- Website: buffalobills.com

Personnel
- Owners: Terry Pegula; Arctos Partners LP; Estate of Kim Pegula; Carter, McGrady, Altidore et al.
- General manager: Brandon Beane
- Head coach: Joe Brady
- President: Terry Pegula

Nicknames
- Electric Company (offense; 1973–1976)

Team history
- Buffalo Bills (1960–present)

Home fields
- War Memorial Stadium (1960–1972); Ralph Wilson Stadium (1973–2025); Highmark Stadium (2026–present)

League / conference affiliations
- American Football League (1960–1969): Eastern Division (1960–1969); National Football League (1970–present): American Football Conference (1970–present); AFC East (1970–present)

Championships
- League championships: 2: AFL championships (pre-1970 AFL–NFL merger) (2) 1964, 1965
- Conference championships: 4: AFC: 1990, 1991, 1992, 1993
- Division championships: 15: AFL Eastern: 1964, 1965, 1966; AFC East: 1980, 1988, 1989, 1990, 1991, 1993, 1995, 2020, 2021, 2022, 2023, 2024

Playoff appearances (25)
- AFL: 1963, 1964, 1965, 1966; NFL: 1974, 1980, 1981, 1988, 1989, 1990, 1991, 1992, 1993, 1995, 1996, 1998, 1999, 2017, 2019, 2020, 2021, 2022, 2023, 2024, 2025

Owners
- Ralph Wilson (1959–2014); Terry & Kim Pegula (2014–present)

The Buffalo Bills are a professional American football team based in the Buffalo–Niagara Falls metropolitan area. The Bills compete in the National Football League (NFL) as a member of the American Football Conference (AFC) East division. The team plays its home games at Highmark Stadium in Orchard Park, New York.

Founded in 1959 as a charter member of the American Football League (AFL), the team joined the NFL in 1970 after the AFL–NFL merger. The team's name is taken from an All-America Football Conference (AAFC) franchise from Buffalo that was named after western frontiersman Buffalo Bill. Drawing much of its fanbase from western New York and neighboring southern Ontario, the Bills are the only NFL team that plays home games in the state of New York. (Note: The New York Giants and New York Jets play at MetLife Stadium in East Rutherford, New Jersey, despite being named after New York.) The franchise is owned by Terry Pegula, who purchased the Bills after the death of the original owner Ralph Wilson in 2014, and a coalition of private equity funds and investors who purchased a minority stake in the team in 2024.

The Bills advanced to the AFL Championship Game three years in a row from 1964 to 1966, winning the first two—the only major professional sports championships for a team representing Buffalo. They struggled heavily in the latter years of the AFL and for much of their first two decades in the NFL, tallying only five winning seasons and three postseason berths from 1967 to 1987. They became perennial postseason contenders in the late 1980s; from 1990 to 1993, they appeared in a record four consecutive Super Bowls and lost each one. From the early 2000s to the mid-2010s, the Bills endured the longest playoff drought in the four major North American professional sports, a 17-year span that made them the last franchise in the four leagues to qualify for the postseason in the 21st century. They returned to consistent postseason contention by the late 2010s, but not the Super Bowl. Their four Super Bowl appearances are the most among NFL franchises that have not won the Super Bowl, a record they share with the Minnesota Vikings.

In 2024, the Bills became one of the first NFL teams to sell part of their franchise to outside private equity investors. 20.6% of the team interest was sold at a valuation of $5.6 billion, including 10% to the American investment group Arctos Partners LP.

== History ==
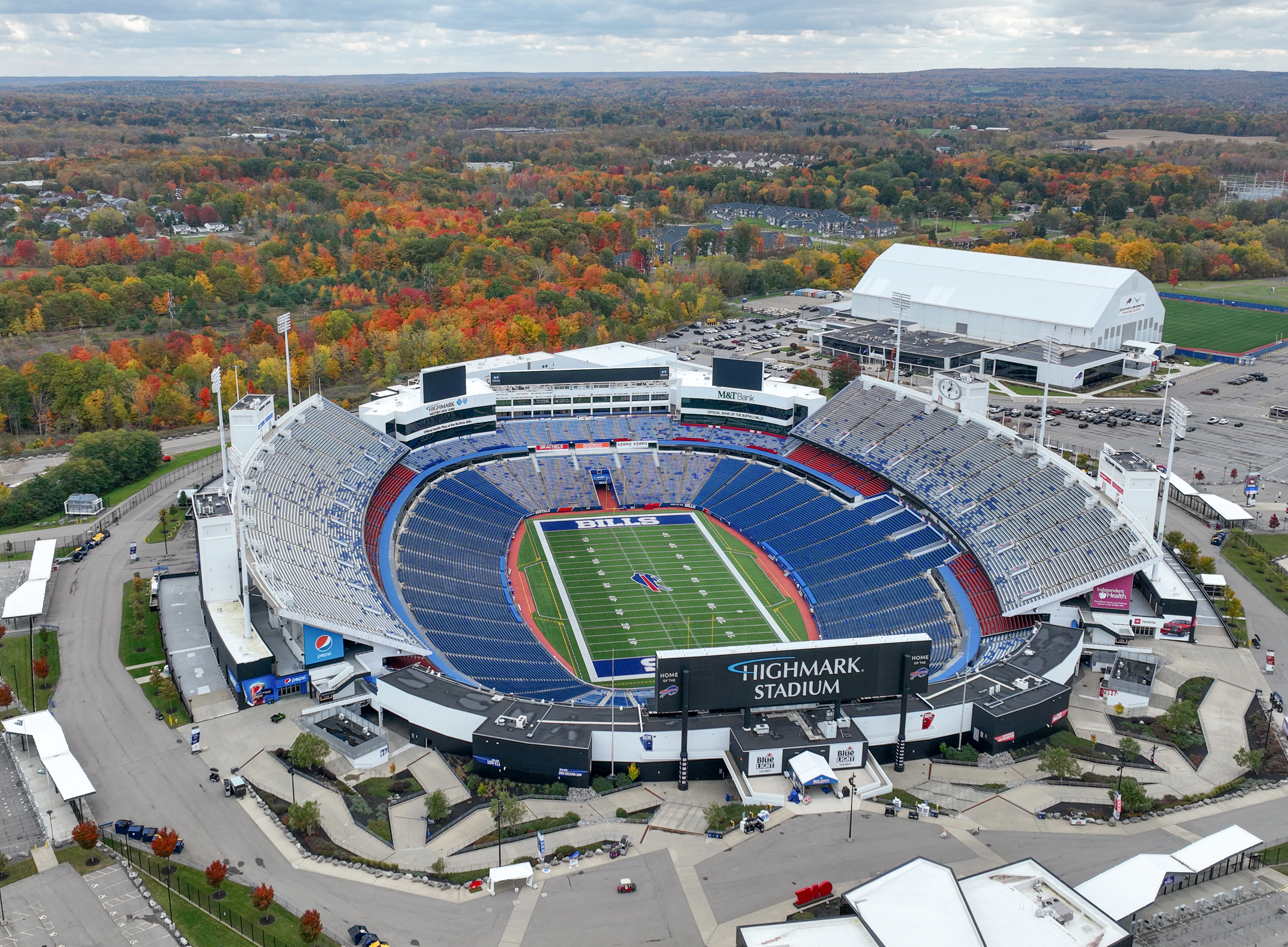
Ralph Wilson Stadium (pictured as Highmark Stadium), located in Orchard Park, New York, was the Bills' home stadium from 1973 to 2025.

The Bills began competitive play in 1960 as a charter member of the American Football League led by head coach Buster Ramsey and joined the NFL as part of the AFL–NFL merger in 1970. In the first two seasons, the Bills went 5–8–1 and 6–8 under Ramsey. The Bills won two consecutive American Football League titles in 1964 and 1965 with quarterback Jack Kemp and coach Lou Saban, but the club has yet to win a league championship since.

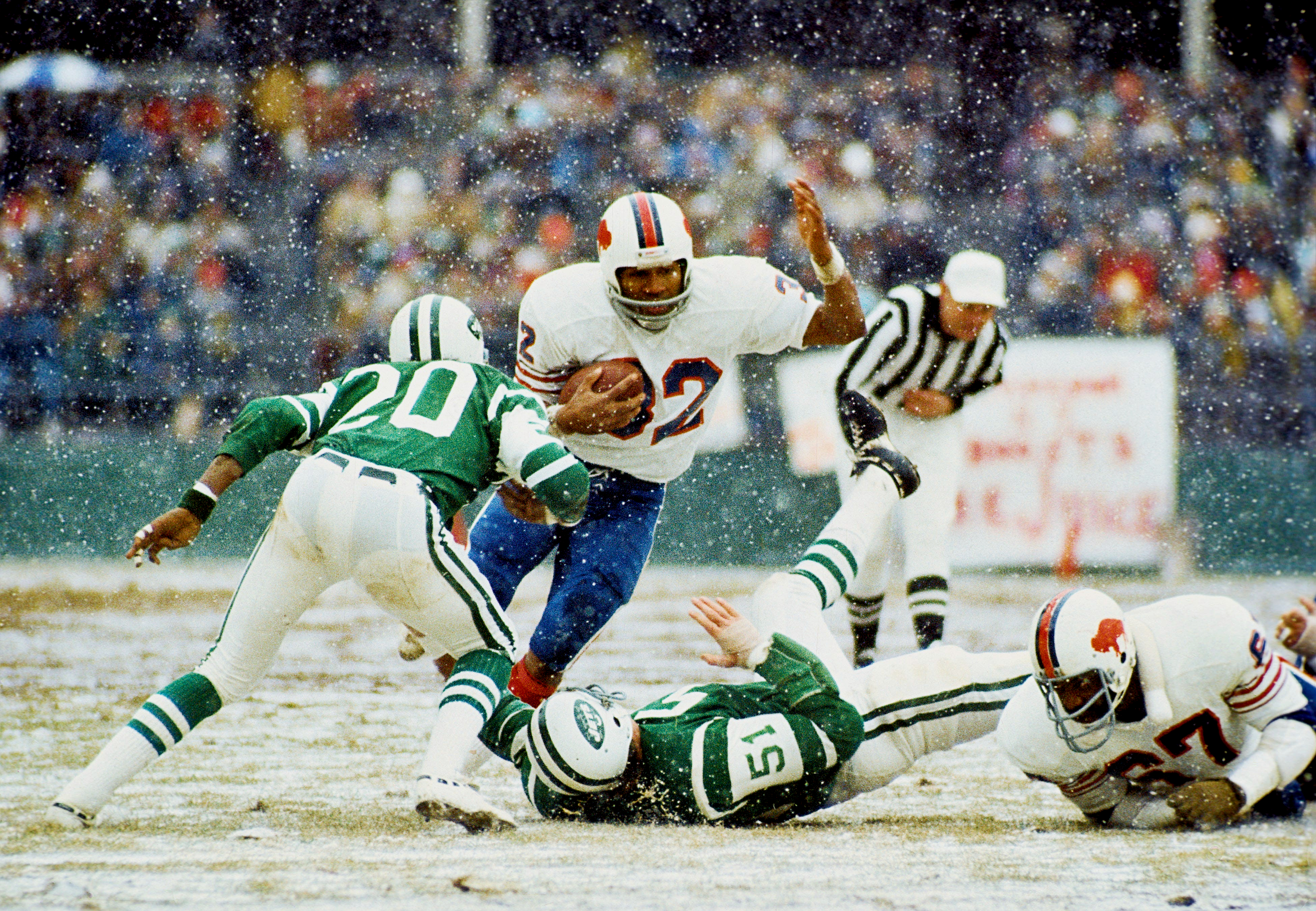
Running back O. J. Simpson, the face of the Bills franchise for most of the 1970s, pictured breaking the NFL's single-season rushing record in 1973

Once the AFL–NFL merger took effect, the Bills became the second NFL team to represent the city; they followed the Buffalo All-Americans, a charter member of the league. Buffalo had been left out of the league since the All-Americans (by that point renamed the Bisons) folded in 1929; the Bills were no less than the third professional non-NFL team to compete in the city before the merger, After the Indians/Tigers of the early 1940s and an earlier team named the Bills, originally the Bisons, in the late 1940s in the All-America Football Conference (AAFC).

After the AFL–NFL merger, the Bills were generally mediocre in the 1970s but featured All-Pro running back O. J. Simpson.

After being pushed to the brink of failure in the mid-1980s, the collapse of the United States Football League and a series of highly drafted players such as Jim Kelly (who initially played for the USFL instead of the Bills), Thurman Thomas, Bruce Smith and Darryl Talley allowed the Bills to rebuild into a perennial contender in the late 1980s through the mid-1990s under head coach Marv Levy, a period in which the team won four consecutive AFC Championships; the team nevertheless lost all four subsequent Super Bowls, records in both categories that still stand.

The rise of the division rival New England Patriots under Bill Belichick and Tom Brady, along with numerous failed attempts at rebuilding in the 2000s and 2010s, helped prevent the Bills from reaching the playoffs in seventeen consecutive seasons between 2000 and 2016, a 17-year drought that was the longest active playoff drought in all major professional sports at the time.

Mike Mularkey coached the Bills in the 2004 and 2005 seasons. He went 9–7 but missed the postseason in 2004 and 5–11 in 2005. He resigned from the team after the 2005 season.

From 2006 to 2009, the Bills were coached by Dick Jauron. After three consecutive 7–9 seasons, Jauron was dismissed after a 3–6 start to his fourth season. Perry Fewell finished out the season as interim with a 3–4 mark.

From 2010 to 2012, the Bills were coached by Chan Gailey. The team had Ryan Fitzpatrick as their quarterback in those seasons. Gailey was fired after three consecutive last place finishes in the AFC East.

Doug Marrone was hired to be the Bills' head coach before the 2013 season. The Bills went 6–10 in the 2013 season and improved to 9–7 in the 2014 season. Marrone decided to step down as head coach after the season. On October 8, 2014, Buffalo Sabres owners Terry and Kim Pegula received unanimous approval to acquire the Bills during the NFL owners' meetings, becoming the second ownership group of the team after team founder Ralph Wilson.

Before the 2015 season, the team hired former Jets head coach Rex Ryan to become the next head coach of the Bills. The team went 8–8 in 2015 and 7–9 in 2016. Ryan was dismissed with one game remaining in the 2016 season, with Anthony Lynn finishing the season as interim.

The new Highmark Stadium, opened in 2026, is the Bills' current home stadium

Under head coach Sean McDermott, the Bills broke the playoff drought, appearing in the playoffs for seven of the next eight seasons. The team drafted Wyoming quarterback Josh Allen with the seventh overall pick in the first round of the 2018 NFL draft. The team earned its first division championship and playoff wins since 1995 during the 2020 season, attributed to the Bills' own development of a core talent including Allen, Stefon Diggs, Matt Milano, and Tre'Davious White. In the 2020 season, the Bills reached the AFC Championship for the first time since the 1993 season. However, their run ended with a 38–24 loss to the Kansas City Chiefs. The Bills won the AFC East with a 11–6 record in the 2021 season. The Bills defeated the Patriots 47–17 in the Wild Card Round before falling to the Kansas City Chiefs 42–36 in overtime.

In the 2022 season, the Bills won the AFC East with a 13–3 record. The season saw a cancelled game against the Bengals due to a near-fatal medical episode with Damar Hamlin, who eventually recovered and returned to football activities the following season. The team defeated the Miami Dolphins in the Wild Card Round 34–31 before falling to the Cincinnati Bengals 27–10 in the Divisional Round. In the 2023 season, the Bills won the AFC East for the fourth consecutive season. In the Wild Card Round, they defeated the Pittsburgh Steelers 31–17 before falling to the Kansas City Chiefs in the Divisional Round 27–24. In the 2024 season, the Bills finished with a 13–4 record and won another AFC East title. After wins over the Denver Broncos in the Wild Card Round and the Baltimore Ravens in the Divisional Round, the Bills lost to the Kansas City Chiefs in the AFC Championship. The following season saw the team's streak of consecutive division titles end, as they finished with a 12–5 record. They defeated the Jacksonville Jaguars in the Wild Card Round before falling to the Broncos in the Divisional Round. Two days later, McDermott was fired after 9 seasons.

After Kim Pegula was incapacitated by a 2022 vascular brain injury, a portion of her stake in the team was transferred to her stepdaugher Laura, with a 20% stake in the team sold to a coalition of private equity investors and former Toronto athletes Jozy Altidore, Vince Carter and Tracy McGrady in December 2024. The Bills announced plans to build a new stadium to replace Highmark Stadium that opened in summer 2026.. On September 17, 2026, the Bills played their first game in the new stadium, winning against the Detroit Lions by a score of 41-31.

== Logos and uniforms ==
Bills logo, 1962–1973

For their first two seasons, the Bills wore uniforms based on those of the Detroit Lions at the time. Ralph Wilson had been a minority owner of the Lions before founding the Bills, and the Bills' predecessors in the AAFC had also worn blue and silver uniforms.

The team's original colors were Honolulu blue, silver, and white, and the helmets were silver with no striping. There was no logo on the helmet, which displayed the players' numbers on each side.

In 1962, the standing red bison was designated as the logo and took its place on a white helmet. In 1962, the team's colors also changed to red, white, and blue. The team switched to blue jerseys with red and white shoulder stripes, similar to the Buffalo Bisons AHL hockey team of the same era. The helmets were white with a red center stripe. The jerseys again saw a change in 1964 when the shoulder stripes were replaced by a distinctive stripe pattern on the sleeves consisting of four stripes, two thicker inner stripes and two thinner outer stripes all bordered by red piping. By 1965, red and blue center stripes were put on the helmets.

The Bills introduced blue pants worn with the white jerseys in 1973, the last year of the standing buffalo helmet. The blue pants remained through 1985. The face mask on the helmet was blue from 1974 through 1986 before changing to white.

The standing bison logo was replaced by a blue charging one with a red slanting stripe streaming from its horn. The newer emblem, still the primary one used by the franchise, was designed by aerospace designer Stevens Wright in 1974.

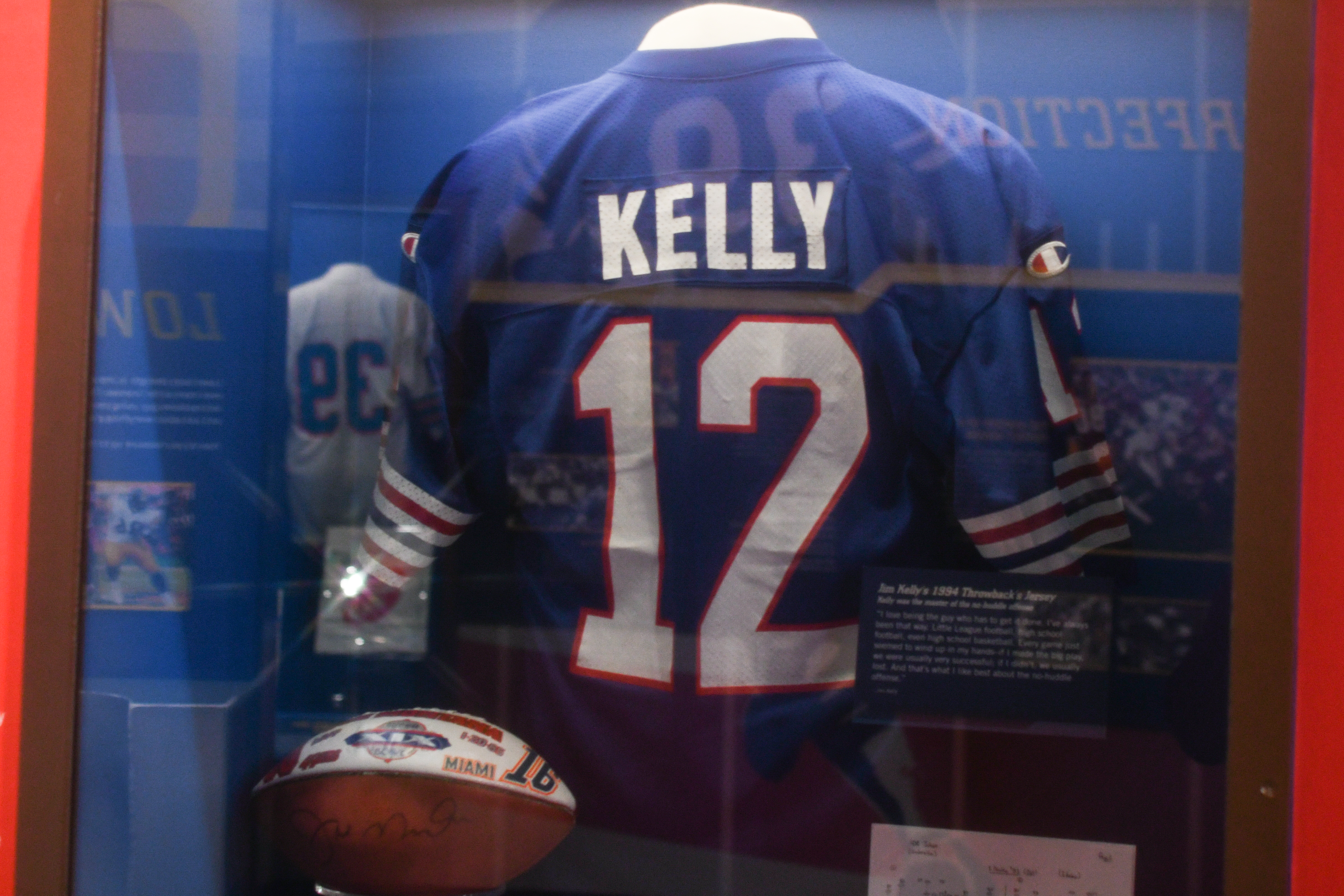
Quarterback Jim Kelly's 1994 jersey displayed at the Pro Football Hall of Fame

In 1984, the helmet's shell color was changed from white to red, primarily to help Bills quarterback Joe Ferguson distinguish them more readily from three of their division rivals at that time, the Baltimore Colts, the Miami Dolphins, and the New England Patriots, who all also wore white helmets at that point. Ferguson said, "Everyone we played had white helmets at that time. Our new head coach Kay Stephenson just wanted to get more of a contrast on the field that may help spot a receiver down the field." (The Patriots have worn silver helmets since 1993, the Colts have since been realigned to the AFC South, and in 2019 the New York Jets have since switched back to green-colored helmets, after playing 20 years with white ones.)

In 2002, under the direction of general manager Tom Donahoe, the Bills' uniforms went through radical changes. A darker shade of blue was introduced as the primary jersey color, and nickel gray was introduced as an accent color. Both the blue and white jerseys featured red side panels. The white jerseys included a dark blue shoulder yoke and royal blue numbers. The helmet remained primarily red with one navy blue, two nickel, two royal blue, two white stripes, and a white face mask. A new logo, a stylized "B" consisting of two bullets and a more detailed buffalo head on top, was proposed and had been released (it can be seen on a few baseball caps that were released for sale), but fan backlash led to the team retaining the running bison logo. The helmet logo adopted in 1974—a charging royal blue bison with a red streak, white horn, and eyeball—remained unchanged.

In 2005, the Bills revived the standing bison helmet and uniform of the mid-1960s as a throwback uniform. Initially, the Bills wore the blue throwbacks with the standing bison helmet before it was scrapped after 2010, before wearing a white version starting in 2012. After last wearing the "standing bison" throwback in 2021, the Bills brought back the design for two home games in 2025 to mark original Highmark Stadium's final season, before it was again retired to give way to their new "Nickel City" alternate uniform.

The Bills usually wore the all-blue combination at home and the all-white combination on the road when not wearing the throwback uniforms. They stopped wearing blue-on-white after 2006, while the white-on-blue was not worn after 2007.

For the 2011 season, the Bills unveiled a new uniform design, an updated rendition of the 1975–83 design. This change includes a return to the white helmets with "charging buffalo" logo, and a return to royal blue instead of navy. The set initially featured striped socks, but by 2021, the Bills gradually reduced its usage and began wearing either all-white or all-blue hosiery without stripes in most games.

Buffalo sporadically wore white at home in the 1980s, including all eight home games in 1984, but stopped doing so beginning in 1987. On November 6, 2011, against the New York Jets, the Bills wore white at home for the first time since 1986. Since 2011, the Bills have worn white for home games, either with their primary uniform or a throwback set.

The Bills' uniform received minor alterations as part of the league's new uniform contract with Nike. The new Nike uniform was unveiled on April 3, 2012.

On November 12, 2015, the Bills and the New York Jets became the first two teams to participate in the NFL's Color Rush uniform initiative, with Buffalo wearing an all-red combination for the first time in team history. Like the primary uniforms, the set initially had red socks with white and blue stripes, but in 2020, it was replaced with red socks without stripes.

A notable use of the Bills' uniforms outside of football was in the 2018 World Junior Ice Hockey Championships when the United States men's national junior ice hockey team wore Bills-inspired uniforms in their outdoor game against Team Canada on December 29, 2017. This game was also played at the Bills' home stadium, Highmark Stadium.

On April 1, 2021, the team announced they would wear white face masks during the upcoming season and beyond.

On December 22, 2024, the team debuted a brand new uniform combination consisting of their red Color Rush uniform and white pants.

On July 22, 2025, the Bills brought back the 1984–2010 red "charging buffalo" helmet as an alternate, which they would wear January 4, 2026 against the New York Jets with the primary blue uniforms. This set was paired with red socks, which the team wore with the red helmets during its original run. The red helmets would return in 2026 for a Christmas Day road game at the Denver Broncos, also keeping the red socks to be worn with their regular white uniforms.

On August 28, 2025, the Bills unveiled a "Rivalries" uniform, which they would wear once per season at home against each of their AFC East opponents over a three-year period. The all-white uniform, dubbed the "Cold Front", featured silver numbers trimmed in blue and a modified "charging buffalo" in silver with blue trim, along with silver and blue stripes on the helmet. Red was not featured in the uniform, as it signified warmth.

On July 27, 2026, the Bills unveiled a new "Nickel City" all-gray uniform with white and red-trimmed blue numbers and dark gray stripes. The set also featured a blue alternate helmet featuring the red "charge" streak.

== Rivalries ==
The Bills have rivalries with their three AFC East opponents (the Miami Dolphins, New England Patriots, and New York Jets) and with the Baltimore/Indianapolis Colts (a former divisional opponent), Kansas City Chiefs, Houston Oilers/Tennessee Titans, Jacksonville Jaguars, and Dallas Cowboys.

The Cleveland Browns shared a rivalry with the Bills' predecessors in the All-America Football Conference. The current teams have a more friendly relationship and have played sporadically since the AFL–NFL merger.

=== Divisional ===
==== Miami Dolphins ====
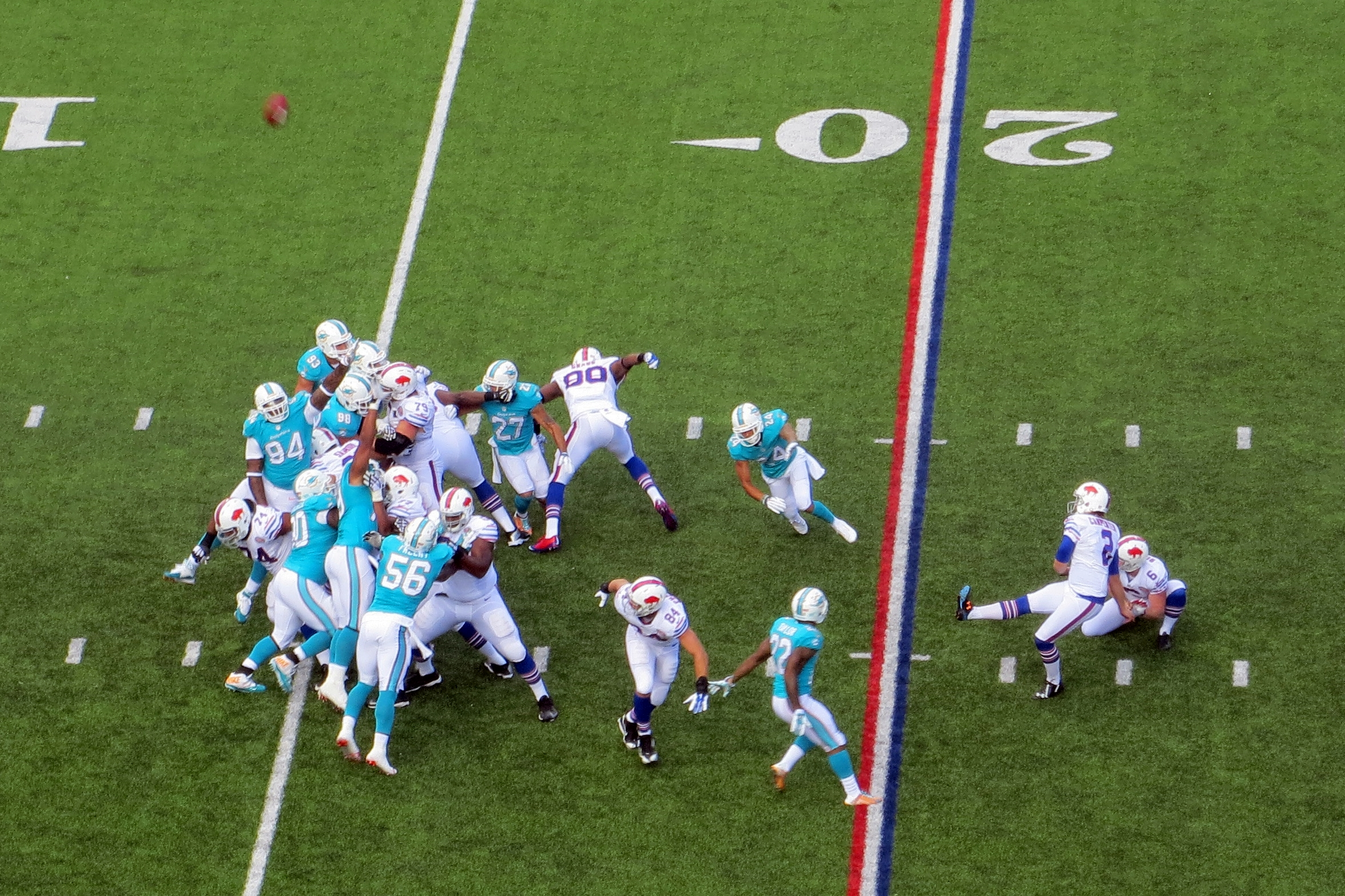
Bills kicker Dan Carpenter attempts a kick against the Dolphins in 2014.

This is often considered Buffalo's most famous rivalry. The Bills were one of the original eight American Football League, while the Dolphins began playing in 1966 as an expansion team. The rivalry first gained prominence when the Dolphins won every matchup against the Bills in the 1970s, and the first of the 1980s, for an NFL-record 20 straight wins against a single opponent. Fortunes changed in the following decades with the rise of Jim Kelly as Buffalo's franchise quarterback. Though Kelly and Dolphins quarterback Dan Marino shared a competitive rivalry in the 1980s and 1990s, the Bills became dominant in the 1990s. Things cooled down after the retirements of Kelly and Marino and the rise of the New England Patriots in the 2000s and 2010s, but Miami remains a fierce rival of the Bills, coming in second place in a recent poll of Buffalo's primary rival, and the two teams have typically been close to each other in win–loss records. They have often competed for the division title since Tua Tagovailoa became Miami's quarterback, despite Buffalo's 13–2 record over the Dolphins under Josh Allen. Miami leads the overall series 62–61–1 as of 2025, but Buffalo has the advantage in the playoffs at 4–1, including a win in the 1992 AFC Championship Game.

==== New England Patriots ====
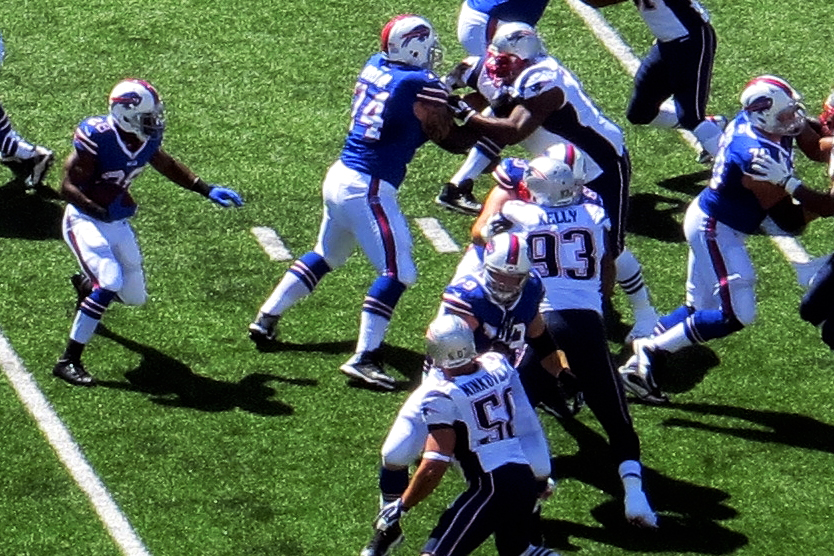
Bills RB C. J. Spiller rushing against the Patriots in 2013

The rivalry with the New England Patriots began when both teams were original franchises in the American Football League (AFL) before the NFL–AFL merger, but did not gain notability until the emergence of New England quarterback Tom Brady in 2001. The teams were very competitive before the 2000s. However, Brady's arrival in the early 2000s led to the Patriots dominating the AFC East, including the Bills, for two decades. As a result, New England replaced the Dolphins as Buffalo's most hated rival. The Bills have taken an 8–3 edge since Brady's departure in 2020, which included consecutive AFC East titles from 2020 to 2024 and a season sweep of the Patriots in two of the first three years. In 2021, the Bills dominated in a 47–17 victory against the Patriots in the two teams' first playoff match-up in 59 years, which saw the Bills score a touchdown on every offensive drive throughout the entire game and, as such, is the only "perfect offensive game" in NFL history. However, the Bills failed to reach the Super Bowl before the Patriots in the post-Brady era. Overall, the Patriots lead the series 79–51–1 as of 2024, but trail the Bills by a 48–47–1 margin without Brady on the field.

Several players have played for both teams, including Drew Bledsoe, Doug Flutie, Lawyer Milloy, Brandon Spikes, Scott Chandler, Chris Hogan, Mike Gillislee, Stephon Gilmore, Mack Hollins, and Stefon Diggs.

==== New York Jets ====
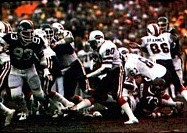
Bills' running back Joe Cribbs (middle) rushes the ball against the Jets in the 1981 AFC Wild Card.

The Bills and Jets, both original AFL teams, represent the state of New York, though the Jets have played their home games in East Rutherford, New Jersey, since 1984. While the rivalry represents the differences between New York City and Western New York, it has historically not been as intense as Buffalo's rivalries with the Dolphins and Patriots. When not playing one another, the teams' fan bases either have grudging respect or low-key annoyance for each other (stemming more from the broader upstate-downstate tensions than the teams or sport). The Bills-Jets rivalry has often become characterized by ugly games and shared mediocrity, but it has had a handful of competitive moments. The series heated up recently when former Jets head coach Rex Ryan became the Bills' head coach for two seasons and had become notable again as Bills quarterback Josh Allen and former Jets quarterback Sam Darnold, both drafted in the same year, maintained a friendly rivalry with one another. Buffalo leads the series 72–58 as of 2025, including a playoff win in 1981.

=== Conference ===
==== Kansas City Chiefs ====
The Kansas City Chiefs, another original franchise in the AFL, have a long history against the Bills, despite the two teams never being in the same division. Buffalo currently leads the series 30–26–1, which has included seven playoff meetings, four of which were AFL/AFC Championship Games; Kansas City won the 1966 AFL Championship Game that determined the AFL's representative in the first Super Bowl against the NFL champion Green Bay Packers, in addition to the 2020 and 2024 AFC Championship Games that saw the team advance to its second and fifth Super Bowl appearances in six years, respectively, while Buffalo defeated Kansas City in the 1993 AFC Championship Game to advance to its fourth straight Super Bowl appearance. However, after each victory in the AFC Championship Game, the Chiefs or the Bills went on to lose the ensuing Super Bowl. Despite a lull in the series in the 2000s and 2010s, the rivalry gained attention as the Bills and Chiefs met in nine of ten years from 2008 to 2017.

After a two-year hiatus in the series, a rivalry between Bills quarterback Josh Allen and Chiefs quarterback Patrick Mahomes developed, particularly in the post-season, drawing comparisons to Jim Kelly's rivalry with Dan Marino as well as the rivalry between Tom Brady and Peyton Manning. Since 2019, four high-profile postseason matchups occurred between the Bills and Chiefs. The four playoff games include the aforementioned 2020 Championship Game and the 2021 Divisional round game, the latter of which is now considered one of the greatest playoff games of all time, but was also controversial due to the league's overtime rules. In 2023 divisional round, Bills lost to the Chiefs 24–27 as Bills kicker Tyler Bass missed the game-tying field goal attempt wide right, a play that evoked memories of Scott Norwood missing the game-winning field goal attempt in Super Bowl XXV. In the 2024 AFC Championship Game, Bills failed to convert two 4th downs in the fourth quarter: the first was a 4th and inches quarterback sneak by Allen that was controversially ruled short of the line of gain and the second was a 4th and 5 pass from Allen that the tight end Kincaid dropped while sliding. The Chiefs went on to win 32–29. In the four playoff matchups between Allen and Mahomes, Mahomes leads the series 4–0, though Allen leads in the regular season 5–1.

==== Baltimore Ravens ====
Another new rivalry emerged with the Baltimore Ravens as the Bills and Ravens have often squared off for conference dominance since Josh Allen and Ravens quarterback Lamar Jackson were drafted in 2018. The two quarterbacks are known for their similar dual-threat styles of play, similar to Patrick Mahomes, and have led their teams to similar success, in addition to combining for three NFL MVP awards. Bills and Ravens fans have also sparred over game results as well as 2024 MVP award, as Ravens supporters argued that Jackson, who finished second in voting, should have won the award instead of Allen. Jackson leads Allen in regular season games 3–2, though Allen has won both postseason matchups. Prior to this, Baltimore and Buffalo played sporadically since the Ravens joined the league in 1996, with the Ravens holding a general advantage in the early portion of the series. The series is tied at 7–7, with Baltimore leading in regular series games 7–5 and Buffalo leading in postseason games 2–0.

The Ravens' predecessors in Baltimore, the Baltimore Colts, were a divisional opponent for Buffalo in AFC East, from 1970 until 2001. The Colts relocated to Indianapolis in 1984 and were later reassigned to the AFC South in 2002.

=== Historical ===
==== Jacksonville Jaguars ====
A rivalry emerged between the Bills and the Jacksonville Jaguars after former Bills head coach Doug Marrone, who had quit the team after the 2014 season, was hired as a coaching assistant for Jacksonville and eventually rose to become the Jaguars' head coach from 2015 to 2020. The first game between the Marrone-led Jaguars was a London game in week 7 of the 2015 season, which saw the Jaguars' win 34–31. The most important game of this series was an ugly, low-scoring Wild Card game in 2017 that saw the Jaguars win 10–3. This game is notable as it was the first Bills playoff appearance in 17 seasons. Before this, Jacksonville had handed Buffalo its first playoff loss in Bills Stadium in 1996. The Bills and Jaguars have since met four times. The first was a "rematch" game in week 12 of the 2018 season; the Bills won 24–21. The teams brawled after trash talk from former Jaguars players such as Jalen Ramsey.

The second time was in week 9 of the 2021 season. By this point, Marrone's feud with the Bills organization and the personal drama between Bills and Jaguars players no longer applied, as Marrone had been fired and replaced by Urban Meyer and all the players from the 2017 Jaguars team have since moved on to other teams or retired. Regardless, this game was the seventh-largest upset at the time in NFL history: the 15.5-point favorite Bills lost 9–6. The Bills would narrowly beat the now Liam Coen led Jaguars 27-24 in the wildcard round of the 2025–26 NFL playoffs which saw the Bills claim the lead late in the 4th quarter with a tush push followed by a Trevor Lawrence interception to win.

==== Houston Oilers/Tennessee Titans ====
The Tennessee Titans (formerly the Houston Oilers) also share an extended history with the Bills, with both teams being original AFL clubs and rivals in that league's East Division before the AFL-NFL merger. The two teams' owners, Ralph Wilson and Bud Adams, were the last owners from the inaugural AFL season still owning their teams at the time of Adams's 2013 death. Matchups were intense in the 1980s and 1990s, with quarterback Warren Moon leading the Oilers against Jim Kelly's Bills. Memorable playoff moments between the teams in the 1990s include The Comeback, in which the Frank Reich-led Bills overcame a 35–3 deficit to stun the Oilers 41–38 in 1992, and the Music City Miracle, in which the now-Titans scored on a near-last-minute kickoff return with a controversial lateral pass ruling to beat the Bills 22–16 in 1999. To add insult to injury, the Music City Miracle was Buffalo's last playoff appearance until 2017, leading to resentment by Bills fans towards the Titans. In 2009, after a particularly brutal Titans rout against the Bills, Adams infamously flipped off the Bills sideline from his suite.

After both teams failed to reach the same success in the late 2000s to early 2010s, they returned to consistent playoff contention starting in 2017, resulting in several high-profile games, in addition to a brief resurgence of the rivalry based on shared success and mutual respect between 2018 and 2022, when the Titans were led by head coach Mike Vrabel (a former Patriots player) and running back Derrick Henry. The Titans currently lead the series 30–21, but the Bills lead in postseason meetings 2–1.

== Notable players ==
=== Retired numbers ===
The Buffalo Bills have retired three numbers: No. 12 for Jim Kelly, No. 34 for Thurman Thomas, and No. 78 for Bruce Smith. Other numbers are no longer issued or are in reduced circulation. Andre Reed will have his No. 83 jersey retired in the 2027 season.

Buffalo Bills retired numbers
| No. | Player | Position | Tenure | Retired |
| 12 | Jim Kelly | QB | 1986–1996 | November 19, 2001 |
| 34 | Thurman Thomas | RB | 1988–1999 | October 30, 2018 |
| 78 | Bruce Smith | DE | 1985–1999 | September 15, 2016 |

==== Reduced circulation ====
Since the team's earliest days, the number 31 was not supposed to be issued to any other player. The Bills had stationery and various other team merchandise showing a running player wearing that number, and it was not supposed to represent any specific person but the 'spirit of the team.' In the first three decades of the team's existence, the number 31 was only seen once. In 1969, when reserve running back Preston Ridlehuber damaged his number 36 jersey during a game, equipment manager Tony Marchitte gave him the number 31 jersey to wear while repairing the number 36. The number 31 was not reissued until 1990 when first-round draft choice James Williams wore it for his first two seasons; it has since been returned to general circulation. It was worn by Damar Hamlin before he switched to number 3, and cornerback Max Hairston wore the number before switching to 1 in 2026.

Number 32 had been withdrawn from circulation but not retired after O. J. Simpson. Former owner Ralph Wilson insisted on not reissuing the number, even after Simpson's highly publicized murder case and later robbery conviction. The number was placed back into circulation in 2019 with Senorise Perry wearing the number that year; it was most recently worn by kicker Michael Badgley.

Number 15 was historically only issued sparingly after the retirement of Jack Kemp, most prominently by Todd Collins in the late 1990s. As of 2026, it is worn by defensive end Greg Rousseau. Other numbers that have been historically issued only on rare circumstances included the 44 of Elbert Dubenion (worn as of 2024 by Joe Andreessen), the 66 of Billy Shaw (worn since 2023 by Connor J. McGovern), and the number 83 of Andre Reed (for which Lee Evans received special dispensation to use it; as of 2026, it is worn by Keleki Latu); each of these numbers were typically only issued to players not expected to make the team's regular season roster.

Number 1 has also historically been used rarely for reasons yet to be explained. While there is no proper explanation, Tommy Hughitt was a player-coach for the early Buffalo teams in the New York Pro Football League and NFL from 1918 to 1924 and was both a major on-field success and a fixture in Buffalo culture after his retirement as a politician and auto salesman. Hughitt was reported to wear number 1 during this time. Cornerback Max Hairston currently wears the number after several years in which it was worn by Curtis Samuel; before Emmanuel Sanders's one-year stint with the Bills in 2021, it had been 19 years since it had been worn in the regular season when kicker Mike Hollis wore it in 2002.

Number 95 has not been reissued since the retirement of Kyle Williams in 2019.

=== Ralph C. Wilson Jr. Distinguished Service Award recipients ===
- 1986 – Ben Williams
- 1987 – Joe DeLamielleure
- 1988 – Steve Freeman
- 1989 – Jerry Butler
- 1990 – Tim Vogler
- 1991 – Joe Ferguson
- 1992 – Ken Jones
- 1993 – Booker Edgerson
- 1994 – Butch Byrd
- 1995 – Tony Greene
- 1996 – Frank Lewis, Roland Hooks
- 1997 – Charley Ferguson, Jim Ritcher
- 1998 – Stew Barber, Ed Rutkowski
- 1999 – Reggie McKenzie, Fred Smerlas
- 2000 – Darryl Talley, Ernie Warlick
- 2001 – Kent Hull, Steve Tasker
- 2002 – Don Beebe
- 2003 – Thurman Thomas
- 2004 – Paul Maguire
- 2005 – Frank Reich
- 2006 – Phil Hansen
- 2007 – Lou Piccone, Denny Lynch
- 2008 – Mark Kelso, Gretchen Geitter
- 2009 – Andre Reed
- 2010 – Ruben Brown
- 2011 – Scott Norwood
- 2012 – Chris Mohr
- 2013 – Al Bemiller
- 2014 – Russ Brandon

=== Wall of Fame ===
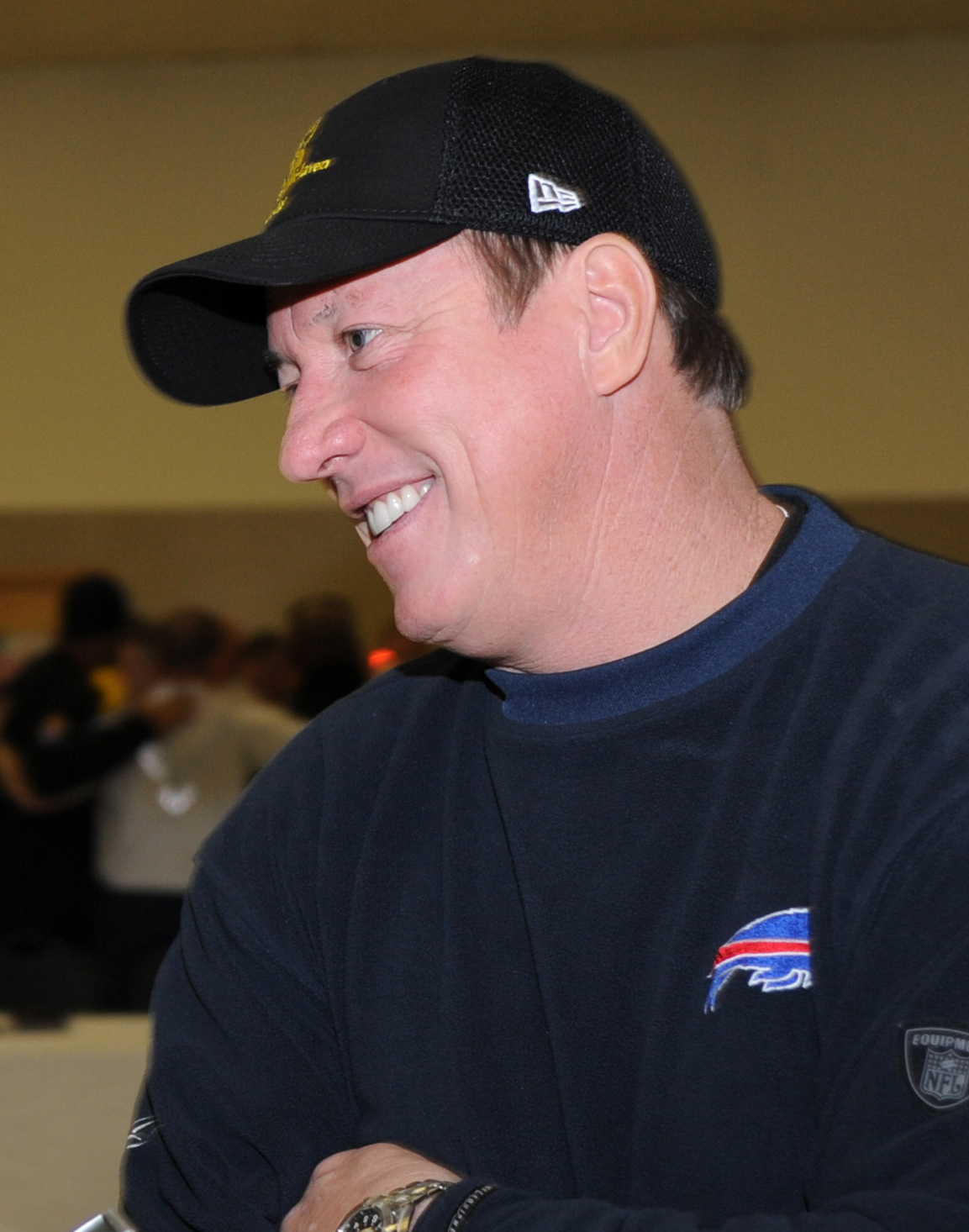
Quarterback Jim Kelly was the first Bills player to have his number retired

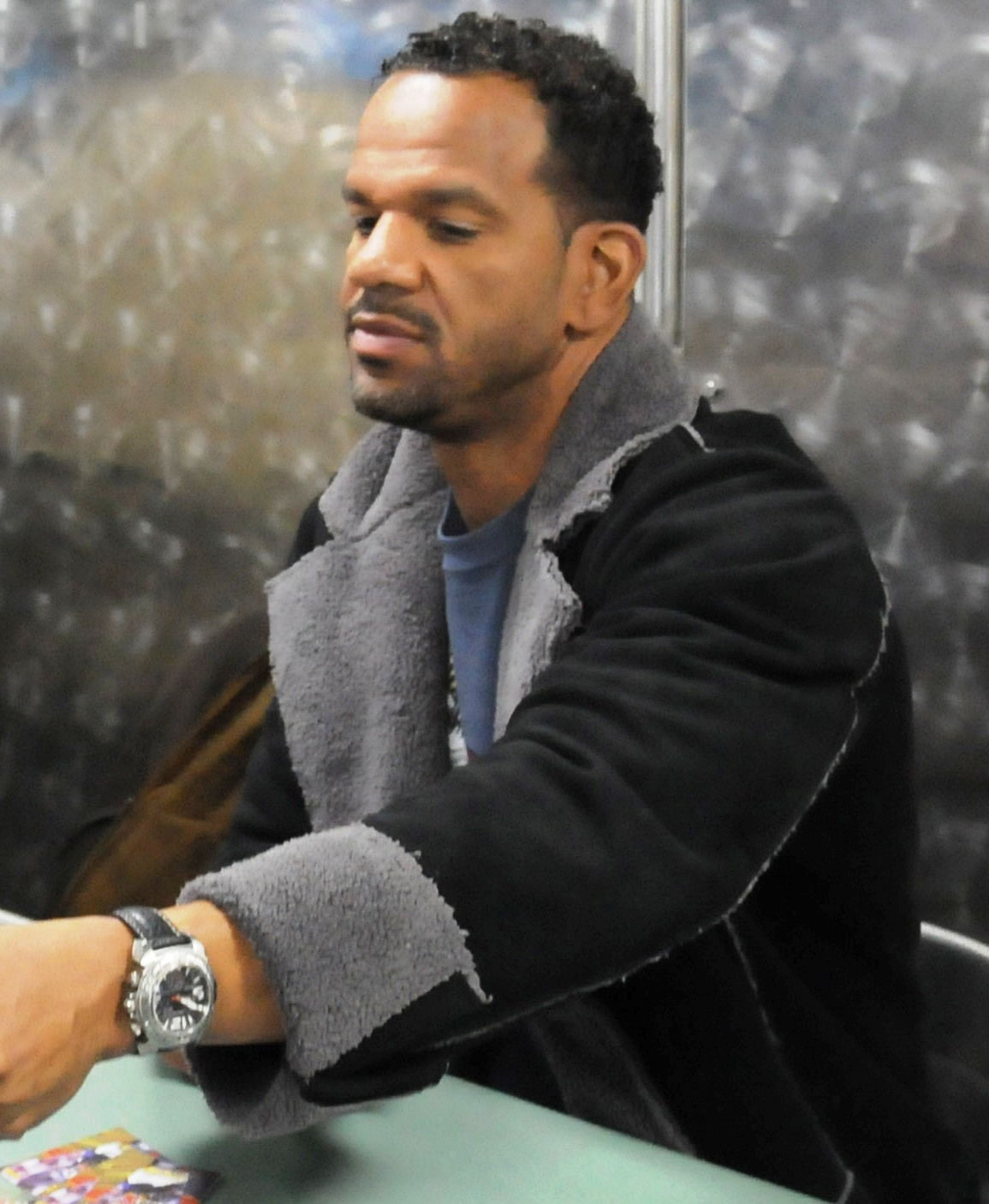
Hall of Fame WR Andre Reed

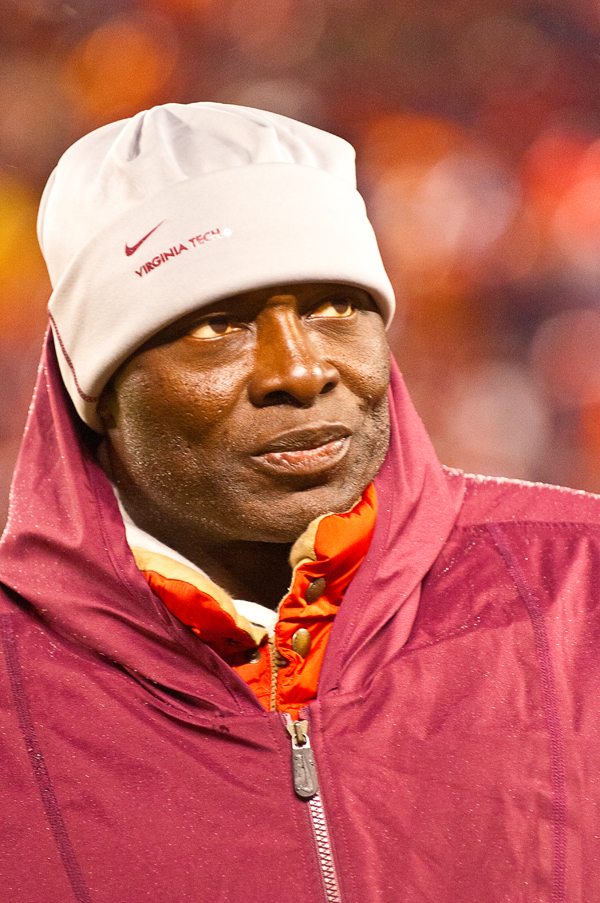
Defensive end Bruce Smith holds the NFL record for quarterback sacks

Inducted to the Pro Football Hall of Fame

Buffalo Bills Wall of Fame
| Inducted | No. | Name | Position | Tenure |
| ~~1980~~ | ~~32~~ | ~~O. J. Simpson~~ | ~~RB~~ | ~~1969–1977~~ |
Simpson was removed in 2026 with the change in stadiums.
| 1984 | 15 | Jack Kemp | QB | 1962–1969 |
| 1985 | – | Pat McGroder | Contributor; GM | 1961–1983; 1983 |
| 1987 | 70 | Tom Sestak | DT | 1962–1968 |
| 1988 | 66 | Billy Shaw | OG | 1961–1969 |
| 1989 | – | Ralph C. Wilson Jr. | Owner | 1959–2014 |
| 1992 | 12 | Bills Mafia | Fans | 1960–present |
From 1992 to 2026, the fanbase was credited as the 12th Man under license from trademark holder Texas A&M University.
| 1993 | 44 | Elbert Dubenion | WR | 1960–1968 |
| 1994 | 58 | Mike Stratton | LB | 1962–1972 |
| 1995 | 12 | Joe Ferguson | QB | 1973–1984 |
| 1996 | – | Marv Levy | HC; GM | 1986–1997; 2006–2007 |
| 1997 | 68 | Joe DeLamielleure | OG | 1973–1979; 1985 |
| 1998 | 20 | Robert James | CB | 1969–1974 |
| 1999 | – | Edward Abramoski | Trainer | 1960–1996 |
| 2000 | 61 | Bob Kalsu | G | 1968 |
| 2000 | 26 | George Saimes | S | 1963–1969 |
| 2001 | 12 | Jim Kelly | QB | 1986–1996 |
| 2001 | 76 | Fred Smerlas | DT | 1979–1989 |
| 2002 | 67 | Kent Hull | C | 1986–1996 |
| 2003 | 56 | Darryl Talley | LB | 1983–1994 |
| 2004 | 51 | Jim Ritcher | G | 1980–1993 |
| 2005 | 34 | Thurman Thomas | RB | 1988–1999 |
| 2006 | 83 | Andre Reed | WR | 1985–1999 |
| 2007 | 89 | Steve Tasker | WR | 1986–1997 |
| 2008 | 78 | Bruce Smith | DE | 1985–1999 |
| 2010 | 24 | Booker Edgerson | CB | 1962–1969 |
| 2011 | 90 | Phil Hansen | DE | 1991–2001 |
| 2012 | – | Bill Polian | GM | 1984–1992 |
| 2014 | – | Van Miller | Broadcaster | 1960–1971; 1977–2003 |
| 2015 | – | Lou Saban | Coach | 1962–1965; 1972–1976 |
| 2017 | 34 | Cookie Gilchrist | RB | 1962–1964 |

=== Pro Football Hall of Fame ===
Buffalo Bills Hall of Famers
Players
| No. | Name | Position | Tenure | Inducted |
| 32 | O. J. Simpson | RB | 1969–1977 | 1985 |
| 66 | Billy Shaw | OG | 1961–1969 | 1999 |
| 12 | Jim Kelly | QB | 1986–1996 | 2002 |
| 80 | James Lofton | WR | 1989–1992 | 2003 |
| 68 | Joe DeLamielleure | OG | 1973–1979; 1985 | 2003 |
| 34 | Thurman Thomas | RB | 1988–1999 | 2007 |
| 78 | Bruce Smith | DE | 1985–1999 | 2009 |
| 83 | Andre Reed | WR | 1985–1999 | 2014 |
| 81 | Terrell Owens | WR | 2009 | 2018 |
Coaches and Executives
| Name | | Position | Tenure | Inducted |
| 16 | Tom Flores | Assistant coach | 1971 | 2021 |
| Marv Levy | | Head coach General Manager | 1986–1997; 2006–2007 | 2001 |
| Ralph Wilson | | Owner | 1959–2014 | 2009 |
| Bill Polian | | General Manager | 1984–1992 | 2015 |

=== 50th Anniversary Team ===
| Position | Player | Tenure |
Offense
| QB | Jim Kelly | 1986–1996 |
| RB | Thurman Thomas | 1988–1999 |
| WR | Andre Reed | 1985–1999 |
| WR | Eric Moulds | 1996–2005 |
| WR | James Lofton | 1989–1992 |
| TE | Pete Metzelaars | 1985–1994 |
| G | Joe DeLamielleure | 1973–1979, 1985 |
| G | Billy Shaw | 1961–1969 |
| G | Ruben Brown | 1995–2003 |
| G | Jim Ritcher | 1980–1993 |
| C | Kent Hull | 1986–1996 |
Defense
| DE | Bruce Smith | 1985–1999 |
| DT | Fred Smerlas | 1979–1989 |
| DT | Tom Sestak | 1962–1968 |
| LB | Darryl Talley | 1983–1994 |
| LB | Mike Stratton | 1962–1972 |
| LB | Cornelius Bennett | 1987–1995 |
| LB | Shane Conlan | 1987–1992 |
| CB | Butch Byrd | 1964–1970 |
| CB | Nate Odomes | 1987–1993 |
| S | George Saimes | 1963–1969 |
| S | Henry Jones | 1991–2000 |
Special teams
| K | Steve Christie | 1992–2001 |
| P | Brian Moorman | 2001–2013 |
| ST | Steve Tasker | 1986–1997 |
Coach
| HC | Marv Levy | 1986–1997 |

=== Silver Anniversary Team ===
On April 27, 1984, Bills announced the Silver Anniversary team to commemorate its 25th anniversary.

| Position | Player | Tenure |
Offense
| QB | Jack Kemp | 1962–1969 |
| RB | O. J. Simpson | 1969–1977 |
| FB | Cookie Gilchrist | 1962–1964 |
| WR | Elbert Dubenion | 1960–1968 |
| WR | Bob Chandler | 1971–1979 |
| TE | Ernie Warlick | 1962–1965 |
| OT | Joe Devlin | 1976–1989 |
| G | Billy Shaw | 1961–1969 |
| C | Al Bemiller | 1961–1969 |
Defense
| DE | Ben Williams | 1976–1985 |
| DE | Ron McDole | 1963–1970 |
| NT | Fred Smerlas | 1979–1989 |
| DT | Tom Sestak | 1962–1968 |
| LB | John Tracey | 1962–1967 |
| LB | Jim Haslett | 1979–1985 |
| LB | Mike Stratton | 1962–1972 |
| CB | Robert James | 1969–1974 |
| CB | Butch Byrd | 1964–1970 |
| S | George Saimes | 1963–1969 |
| S | Steve Freeman | 1975–1986 |
Special teams
| K | Pete Gogolak | 1964–1965 |
| P | Paul Maguire | 1964–1970 |
Staff
| Owner | Ralph Wilson | 1960–2014 |

== Coaching staff ==
=== Head coaches ===
The Bills have had twenty coaches serve as head coach in franchise history.

=== Current staff ===
Buffalo Bills staff
| Front office: Owner/CEO/president – Terry Pegula; Owner – Kim Pegula; President of football operations/general manager – Brandon Beane; Assistant general manager – Brian Gaine; Assistant general manager – Terrance Gray; Senior advisor to the GM/football operations – Jim Overdorf; Senior personnel advisor – Malik Boyd; Co-director of pro scouting – Chris Marrow; Co-director of pro scouting – Curtis Rukavina; Assistant director of pro scouting – Asil Mulbah; Vice president of football administration – Kevin Meganck; Director of football operations – Brendan Rowe; Director of college scouting – Matt Bazirgan; Assistant director of college scouting - Alonzo Dotson; Vice president of football research – Dennis Lock; Director of administration – Matt Worswick; Head coaches: Head coach – Joe Brady; Senior assistant – John Fox; Offensive coaches: Offensive coordinator – Pete Carmichael; Quarterbacks – Bo Hardegree; Assistant quarterbacks – Kyle Shurmur; Running backs – Kelly Skipper; Wide receivers – Drew Terrell; Assistant wide receivers – DJ Mangas; Run game coordinator/tight ends – Rob Boras; Offensive line – Pat Meyer; Assistant offensive line – Austin Gund; Pass game specialist/game management – Marc Lubick; Offensive assistant – Trace McSorley; Offensive assistant/fellowship – Milli Wilson | Defensive coaches: Defensive coordinator – Jim Leonhard; Defensive line – Terrance Jamison; Inside linebackers – John Egorugwu; Outside linebackers – Bobby April III; Secondary – Joe Danna; Cornerbacks – Jay Valai; Senior defensive assistant – Jason Rebrovich; Defensive assistant – Alvin Vaughn; Defensive quality control – Craig Robertson; Special teams coaches: Special teams coordinator – Jeff Rodgers; Assistant special teams – Turner West; Strength and conditioning: Head strength and conditioning – Will Greenberg; Strength & conditioning assistant – Nick Lacy; Assistant strength & conditioning – Hal Luther; Senior strength and conditioning assistant – Barry Rubin; Strength & conditioning assistant – Jason Oszvart; → Coaching staff → Front office → More NFL staffs |

== Current roster ==
Buffalo Bills roster
| Quarterbacks (QB): 17 Josh Allen; 11 Kyle Allen; Running backs (RB): 4 James Cook; 7 Ray Davis KR; 26 Ty Johnson; Wide receivers (WR): 13 Skyler Bell; 0 Keon Coleman; 19 Greg Dortch; 2 D. J. Moore; 10 Khalil Shakir; 14 Tyrell Shavers; Tight ends (TE): 85 Jackson Hawes; 86 Dalton Kincaid; 88 Dawson Knox; 83 Keleki Latu | Offensive linemen (OL): 70 Alec Anderson G; 74 Jude Bowry T/G; 79 Spencer Brown T; 63 Austin Corbett G/C; 53 Lloyd Cushenberry C; 73 Dion Dawkins T; 68 Tylan Grable T/G; 66 Connor McGovern C; 64 O'Cyrus Torrence G; Defensive linemen (DL): 90 DeWayne Carter DE; 97 Greg Gaines NT; 94 Landon Jackson DE; 91 Ed Oliver DE; 98 T. J. Sanders DE; 96 Deone Walker NT | Linebackers (LB): 44 Joe Andreessen ILB; 8 Terrel Bernard ILB; 9 Bradley Chubb OLB; 51 Mike Danna OLB; 52 Kaleb Elarms-Orr ILB; 55 Michael Hoecht OLB; 99 T. J. Parker OLB; 15 Greg Rousseau OLB; 56 Javon Solomon OLB; 42 Dorian Williams ILB; Defensive backs (DB): 23 Dee Alford CB; 47 Christian Benford CB; 24 Cole Bishop S; 28 Sam Franklin Jr. S; 1 Maxwell Hairston CB; 3 Damar Hamlin S; 37 Jordan Hancock CB; 22 Amani Hooker S; 21 Davison Igbinosun CB; 29 Jalon Kilgore S; Special teams (ST): 16 Tyler Bass K; 39 Tommy Doman P; 69 Reid Ferguson LS | Practice squad: 6 Shane Buechele QB; 67 Travis Clayton NT (IPP); -- Te'Cory Couch CB; 20 Frank Gore Jr. RB; 89 Stephen Gosnell WR; 49 Keonta Jenkins ILB; 59 Andre Jones Jr. LB; 38 Kader Kohou CB; 45 Brock Lampe FB; 77 Chase Lundt T; 84 Ja'Mori Maclin WR; 72 Phidarian Mathis NT; 18 Trent Sherfield WR; 25 Geno Stone S; 54 Shaq Thompson ILB; 41 Kani Walker CB; 27 Tre'Davious White CB; Reserve: 92 Zane Durant DE (IR); 5 Josh Palmer WR (IR); 60 Ar'maj Reed-Adams G (IR); 43 Dorian Strong CB (NF-Inj.) 53 active, 16 practice squad (1 IPP), 4 reserve As of November 18, 2026. Rookies in italics.; Roster; Depth chart; Transactions |

== Radio and television ==
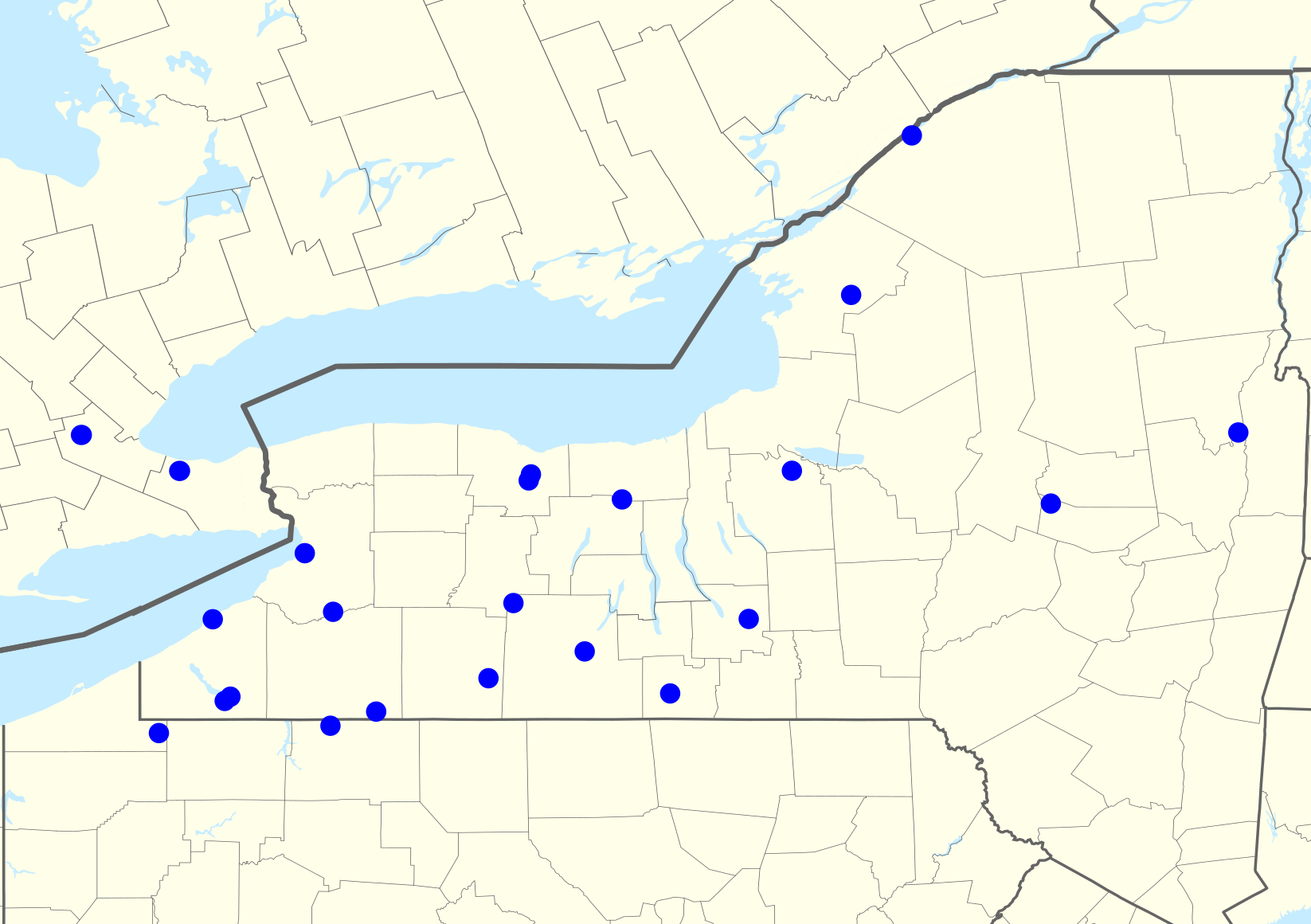
Map of radio affiliates. One affiliate in Wyoming is not shown.

The Buffalo Bills Radio Network carries the Bills' games on radio across upstate New York, along with portions of Pennsylvania, Ontario and Wyoming. Chris Brown is the team's current play-by-play announcer, having taken over from John Murphy (the announcer from 2003 to 2022 and color commentator most years from 1984 to 2003) after Murphy suffered a stroke. Former Bills center Eric Wood is the color analyst. The network has no formal flagship station, as its partner Good Karma Brands (which took over from Audacy, Inc. in 2026) has no stations in the Bills' territory.

In 2018, the team signed an agreement with Nexstar Media Group to carry Bills preseason games across its network of stations in the region. As of 2020, WIVB-TV serves as the flagship station of the network, which includes WJET-TV in Erie, Pennsylvania; WROC-TV in Rochester, WSYR-TV in Syracuse, WUTR in Utica, WWTI in Watertown, WETM-TV in Elmira and WIVT in Binghamton. Steve Tasker does color commentary on these games; the play-by-play position is rotated between Andrew Catalon and Rob Stone. WROC-TV reporter Thad Brown is the sideline reporter. Since 2008, preseason games have been broadcast in high definition.

Beginning in the 2016 season, as per a new rights deal that covers rights to the team as well as its sister NHL franchise, the Buffalo Sabres, most team-related programming, including studio programming and the coach's show, was re-located to MSG Western New York—a joint venture of MSG and the team ownership. Preseason games will continue to air in simulcast on broadcast television.

In the event that regular season games are broadcast by ESPN or a streaming service, in accordance with the league's television policies, a local Buffalo station will broadcast the game. From 2014 to 2017, WKBW-TV held the broadcast rights to that contest, with the station winning back the rights to cable games after WBBZ-TV held the rights for 2012 and 2013.

== Training camp sites ==
- 1960–1962, Roycroft Inn, East Aurora, New York
- 1963–1967, Camelot Hotel, Blasdell, New York
- 1968–1980, Niagara University, Lewiston, New York
- 1981–1999, State University of New York at Fredonia, Fredonia, New York
- 2000–present, St. John Fisher University, Pittsford, New York

== Mascots, cheerleaders, and marching band ==
The Bills' official mascot is Billy Buffalo, an eight-foot-tall, anthropomorphic blue American bison who wears the jersey "number" BB.

The Bills do not have cheerleaders. The Bills operated a cheerleading squad from 1967 to 1985; from 1986 to 2013, a new squad, the Buffalo Jills, was formed and was sponsored by various companies legally separate from the Bills organization. The Jills suspended operations before the 2014 season due to legal actions. The Bills and Jills were previously involved in a legal battle, in which the Jills alleged they were employees, not independent contractors, and sought back pay. On March 3, 2022, a settlement was reached where the Bills agreed to pay the Jills $3.5 million, while Cumulus Media paid $4 million in stock options of the company while admitting no wrongdoing.

The Bills are one of six teams in the NFL to designate an official marching band or drumline (the others being the Baltimore Ravens, Washington Commanders, New York Jets, Carolina Panthers and Seattle Seahawks). Since the last game of the 2013 season, this position has been served by the Stampede Drumline, known outside of Buffalo as Downbeat Percussion.

The Bills have several theme songs associated with them. The most popular is a variation of the Isley Brothers hit "Shout," recorded by Scott Kemper, which served as the Bills' official promotional song from 1987 through 1990s. It can be heard at every Bills home game after a field goal or touchdown and at the game's end if the Bills win. The Bills' unofficial fight song, "Go Bills," was penned by Bills head coach Marv Levy in the mid-1990s on a friendly wager with his players that he will write the song if the team won a particular game. In 2024, the Bills offensive players began a tradition of singing along to "Mr. Brightside" by The Killers as a hype song, usually in the fourth quarter; the Bills were undefeated at home in 2024 after the song was introduced.

== Supporters ==
The "Bills Backers" are the official fan organization of the Buffalo Bills. It has over 200 chapters across North America, Europe, and Oceania. Also notable is the "Bills Mafia," organized via Twitter beginning in 2010 by Del Reid, Leslie Wille, and Breyon Harris; the phrase "Bills Mafia" had by 2017 grown to unofficially represent the broad community surrounding and encompassing the team as a whole, and players who join the Bills often speak of joining the Bills Mafia. Outsiders frequently treat the Bills' fan base in derogatory terms, especially since the 2010s, partly because of negative press coverage of select fans' wilder antics. In 2020, the Bills filed to trademark the "Bills Mafia" name. It also became the team's official hashtag on social media.

Bills fans are particularly well known for their wearing of Zubaz zebra-printed sportswear; so much is the association between Bills fans and Zubaz that when a revival of the company opened its first brick-and-mortar storefront, it chose Western New York as its first location. The "wing hat," a hat shaped like a spicy chicken wing (much in the same style as the Green Bay Packers' Cheesehead hats), can also frequently be seen atop Bills fans' heads, having originated as promotional merchandise by the Anchor Bar, the purported inventors of the modern chicken wing as a delicacy. Another hat associated with the Bills fandom is the water buffalo hat, resembling the headgear of the fictional Loyal Order of Water Buffaloes seen in the TV series The Flintstones; this hat gained particular popularity with the Water Buffalo Club 716, a community of over 2,000 Bills supporters from around the world founded in 2021 by Therese Forton-Barnes. In 1982, a local grocery store introduced the Whammy Weenie as a promotional item, a maraca-like hot dog-shaped device, painted green (which was not a Bills color, but instead painted as such in reference to a military slang term), that Bills fans were supposed to shake at the team's opponents; Bills owner Ralph Wilson, after having seen a Whammy Weenie dangled in front of his suite in the midst of a disappointing season, ordered the Whammy Weenie to be discontinued due to the double entendre it posed.

Bills Mafia members are also well known for jumping off of elevated surfaces (often cars or RVs) into folding tables, in the style of professional wrestlers, during the pregame tailgate. Bills Mafia fans do this in tradition as to be closer to the players as to get similar injuries they get during the game without playing football.Another notable thing that Bills Mafia members often do is utilize the team’s slogan, “go Bills,” in such a way that functions as greeting, a farewell, or even a sign of identification between other members of the Buffalo Bills Mafia.

Bills fans are noted for their frequent support for charitable causes, especially helping charities run by players from opposing teams. After the Bills received help in breaking their 17-year playoff drought through a last-minute Cincinnati Bengals victory, Bills fans crowdfunded the charities of Bengals players Andy Dalton and Tyler Boyd with hundreds of thousands of dollars as a gesture of thanks. Also in 2020, after a November 8 upset win over the Seattle Seahawks led by one of the best-ever performances by quarterback Josh Allen, news emerged that Allen had taken the field the day after his grandmother's death. Fans showed support for their team and community by donating nearly $700,000 to the Oishei Children's Hospital, an organization supported by Allen during his time in Buffalo. After the Bills' defeat of the Baltimore Ravens in the Divisional round of the 2020–21 NFL playoffs and an injury to Ravens quarterback Lamar Jackson late in that game, Bills fans crowdfunded Jackson's favorite charity, Blessings in a Backpack. After a 2024 game between the Bills and Miami Dolphins, Bills fans helped raise $18,000 for Dolphins quarterback Tua Tagovailoa's charity, The Tua Foundation, after Tagovailoa suffered a concussion during the game.

The Bills are one of the favorite teams of ESPN announcer Chris Berman, who picked the Bills to reach the Super Bowl nearly every year in the 1990s. Berman often uses the catchphrase, "No one circles the wagons like the Buffalo Bills!" Berman gave the induction speech for Bills owner Ralph Wilson when Wilson was inducted into the Pro Football Hall of Fame in 2009.

The Bills were also the favorite team of late NBC political commentator Tim Russert, a South Buffalo native, who often referred to the Bills on his Sunday morning talk show, Meet the Press. (His son, Luke, is also a notable fan of the team.) CNN's Wolf Blitzer, also a Buffalo native, has proclaimed he is also a fan, as has CBS Evening News lead anchor and Tonawanda native Jeff Glor and Buffalo natives Secretary of Labor Tom Perez and Governor Kathy Hochul.

ESPN anchor Kevin Connors has been a Bills fan since he attended Ithaca College. Actor Nick Bakay, a Buffalo native, is also a well-known Bills fan; he has discussed the team in segments of NFL Top 10. Character actor William Fichtner, raised in Cheektowaga, is a fan; did a commercial for the team in 2014. In 2015, Fichtner narrated the ESPN 30 for 30 documentary on the Bills' four Super Bowl appearances, "Four Falls of Buffalo". Former Olympic swimmer Summer Sanders (an in-law to former Bills kicker Todd Schlopy) has professed her fandom of the team. Actor Christopher McDonald, who was raised in Romulus, New York, is a fan of the team.

Persons notable almost entirely for their Bills fandom include Ken "Pinto Ron" Johnson, whose antics while appearing at every Bills home and away game since 1994 earned enough scrutiny that his tailgate parties were banned from stadium property on order of the league; John Lang, an Elvis impersonator who carries a large guitar that he uses as a billboard; Marc Miller, whose professional wrestling promo-style interview with WGRZ before Super Bowl XXVII (distinguished by the line "Dallas is going down, Gary!" and picked up at the time by The George Michael Sports Machine) was rediscovered in 2019; and Ezra Castro, also known as "Pancho Billa", a native of El Paso, Texas who wore a large sombrero and lucha mask in Bills colors. Castro was diagnosed with a spinal tumor that had metastasized in 2017; he was invited on stage during the 2018 NFL draft to read one of the Bills' selections. Castro died on May 14, 2019.

== In popular culture ==
Several former Buffalo Bills players earned a name in politics in the late 20th century after their playing careers had ended, nearly always as members of the Republican Party. The most famous of these was quarterback Jack Kemp, who was elected to the U.S. House of Representatives from Western New York in 1971—two years after his playing career ended; he remained in Congress for nearly two decades, serving as the Republican Party nominee for Vice President of the United States under Bob Dole in 1996. Kemp's backup, Ed Rutkowski, served as county executive of Erie County from 1979 to 1987. Former tight end Jay Riemersma, nose tackle Fred Smerlas and defensive end Phil Hansen have all run for Congress, though all three either lost or withdrew from their respective races.

== See also ==
- List of American Football League players
- Major North American professional sports teams

== Notes ==
| Preceded by San Diego Chargers | AFL champions 1964, 1965 | Succeeded by Kansas City Chiefs |
