= 2023 Kansas City Chiefs season =

American football team season

- Owner: The Hunt family (Clark Hunt Chairman and CEO)
- General manager: Brett Veach
- Head coach: Andy Reid
- Offensive coordinator: Matt Nagy
- Defensive coordinator: Steve Spagnuolo
- Home stadium: Arrowhead Stadium

Results
- Record: 11–6
- Division place: 1st AFC West
- Playoffs: Won Wild Card Playoffs (vs. Dolphins) 26–7; Won Divisional Playoffs (at Bills) 27–24; Won AFC Championship (at Ravens) 17–10; Won Super Bowl LVIII (vs. 49ers) 25–22 (OT)
- All-Pros: 3: G Joe Thuney (1st team); DT Chris Jones (1st team); CB Trent McDuffie (1st team)
- Pro Bowlers: 5: Selected but did not play due to participation in Super Bowl LVIII: QB Patrick Mahomes; TE Travis Kelce; G Joe Thuney; C Creed Humphrey; DT Chris Jones
- Team MVP: Patrick Mahomes
- Team ROY: Rashee Rice

Uniform
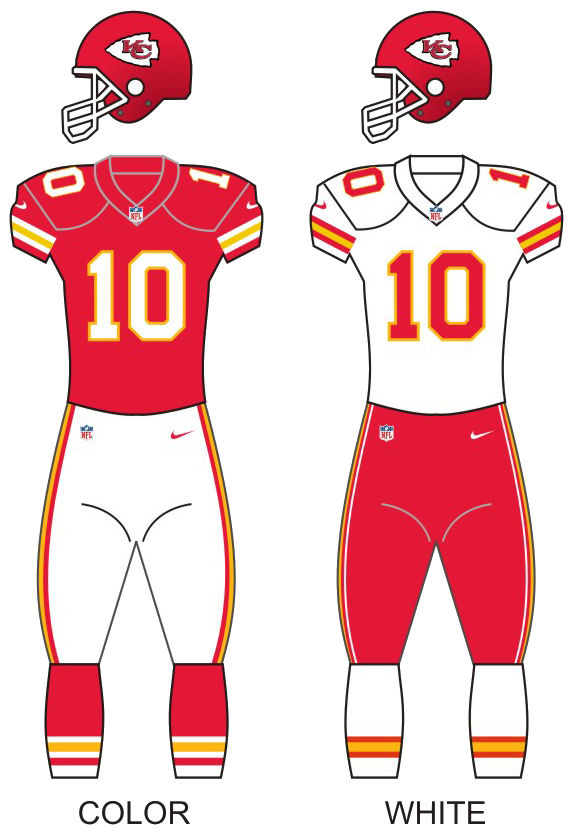

The 2023 season was the Kansas City Chiefs' 54th season in the National Football League (NFL), their 64th overall, and their 11th under head coach Andy Reid. The team entered the year having won Super Bowl LVII the previous season and sought to become the first team since the 2004 New England Patriots to win consecutive league championships.

After a 6–1 start, the Chiefs lost four out of their next six games and, after a Week 13 loss to the Green Bay Packers, failed to match their 14–3 record from the previous year. The Chiefs were plagued by a noticeable decline in offensive production, with the team only scoring 39 touchdowns during the regular season compared to their 61 touchdowns in the prior season. The fall in touchdowns dropped the team in scoring from 2nd in the league to 15th. Nonetheless, by winning three out of their final four games of the season, they finished with an 11–6 record and secured their eleventh consecutive winning season, and became division champions for the eighth consecutive season and a record 16th time overall.

In the playoffs, the Chiefs defeated the Miami Dolphins by the score of 26–7 in the wild card round in frigid weather, as the game was the fourth-coldest game played in NFL history. In the divisional round, the team held on to a narrow 27–24 win over the Buffalo Bills on the road, marking their 3rd postseason victory over Buffalo in four seasons, and additionally marking Kansas City's first road postseason game in the AFC with Patrick Mahomes. They made their sixth consecutive AFC Championship Game appearance, but their first on the road, defeating the Baltimore Ravens with a 17–10 score to advance to their fourth Super Bowl appearance in five years.

In Super Bowl LVIII, the Chiefs defeated the San Francisco 49ers 25–22 in overtime in what was only the second overtime in Super Bowl history (the first being Super Bowl LI) and a rematch of Super Bowl LIV. The win moved the Chiefs to four Super Bowl titles, becoming the seventh franchise to accomplish that number. In addition, the Chiefs' victory made the 2023 squad the first NFL team since the 2004 Patriots to successfully defend their championship and the first team from the AFC West to accomplish the feat since the 1998 Denver Broncos won Super Bowl XXXIII.

The Chiefs' defense was a key part of their Super Bowl-winning season, as they had a 2nd ranked defense in terms of yardage and points per game, only behind the Ravens. Despite all four of their opponents in the playoffs having scoring offenses that finished in the top 10 in the NFL, the Chiefs only allowed 15.8 points per game in the playoffs. Patrick Mahomes won his third Super Bowl MVP with two touchdown passes, including the decisive score in overtime. This marked Mahomes' third Super Bowl title in his first six years starting for the Chiefs. With the team having trailed by ten points in the second quarter, it also marked the third time in the Reid/Mahomes era the Chiefs overcame a double-digit Super Bowl deficit to win the title.

The Kansas City Chiefs drew an average home attendance of 70,968 in 9 home games in the 2023 NFL season.

== NFL Top 100 ==
The Chiefs only had three players ranked in the NFL Top 100 Players of 2023 players for the second straight year. However, all three were ranked in the top 10. Patrick Mahomes was named the number 1 player for the 2nd time. They were the only team with multiple top 10 selections and the second team ever with three in the top 10, after the Los Angeles Rams in 2022.

Rank	Player	Position	Change	Refs
1	Patrick Mahomes	Quarterback	▲7	
5	Travis Kelce	Tight end	▲5	
10	Chris Jones	Defensive tackle	▲29	

== Offseason ==
All transactions in this section occurred between the end of the 2022 season (excluding futures contracts which began to be signed following the conclusion of the regular season) and the Chiefs first preseason game.

=== Coaching staff changes ===
2023 Kansas City Chiefs coaching staff changes
Old coach	Reason	Position	New coach	Refs
Eric Bieniemy	Hired by Washington Commanders	Offensive coordinator	Matt Nagy	
Matt Nagy	Promoted to offensive coordinator	Quarterbacks	David Girardi	
David Girardi	Promoted to quarterbacks coach	Pass game analyst/assistant quarterbacks	Positions eliminated	
Greg Lewis	Hired by Baltimore Ravens	Running backs coach	Todd Pinkston	
N/A	Position created	Pass game coordinator	Joe Bleymaier	
Joe Bleymaier	Job title change	Wide receivers	Connor Embree	
Connor Embree	Promoted to wide receivers coach	Offensive quality control	Kevin Saxton	
N/A	Position created	Assistant running backs	Porter Ellett	

=== Retirements ===
2023 Kansas City Chiefs retirements
Player	Position	Years with the Chiefs	Years in the NFL
Chad Henne	QB	5	15

=== Players lost ===
Below are players who were on the roster at the end of the 2022 season, but were either released or did not re-sign after their contract expired.

2023 Kansas City Chiefs players lost
Player	Position	Reason	New team
Orlando Brown Jr.	LT	UFA	Cincinnati Bengals
Michael Burton	FB	UFA	Denver Broncos
Frank Clark	DE	Released	Denver Broncos
Carlos Dunlap	DE	UFA	Unsigned
Mecole Hardman	WR	UFA	New York Jets
Ronald Jones II	RB	UFA	Dallas Cowboys
Chris Lammons	CB	UFA	Indianapolis Colts
Khalen Saunders	DT	UFA	New Orleans Saints
JuJu Smith-Schuster	WR	UFA	New England Patriots
Juan Thornhill	S	UFA	Cleveland Browns
Andrew Wylie	OT	UFA	Washington Commanders

=== Futures contracts ===
Players signed to futures contracts would typically spend most or all of the previous season on the Chiefs' or another team's practice squad. These contracts are signed after the conclusion of the regular season through the beginning the next league year. Players with an asterisk finished the 2022 season on the Chiefs practice squad.

2023 Kansas City Chiefs futures contracts
Player	Position
Kendall Blanton*	TE
Dicaprio Bootle*	CB
Matt Bushman*	TE
Mike Caliendo*	G
Cole Christiansen*	LB
Jerrion Ealy*	WR
Ty Fryfogle	WR
Chris Oladokun*	QB
La'Mical Perine*	RB
Cornell Powell*	WR
Austin Reiter*	C
John Ross†	WR
Danny Shelton*	DT
Ihmir Smith-Marsette*	WR
Daniel Wise	DT

† John Ross retired before playing any games with the Chiefs.

=== Players added ===
Players below played for another team in 2022 and signed with the Chiefs.

2023 Kansas City Chiefs additions
Player	Position	Previous team
Byron Cowart	DE	Indianapolis Colts
Matt Dickerson	DE	Atlanta Falcons
Mike Edwards	S	Tampa Bay Buccaneers
Blaine Gabbert	QB	Tampa Bay Buccaneers
Sebastian Gutierrez	OT	Las Vegas Raiders
Phil Hoskins	DT	Kansas City Chiefs*
Lamar Jackson	CB	Denver Broncos
Richie James	WR	New York Giants
Charles Omenihu	DE	San Francisco 49ers
Donovan Smith	OT	Tampa Bay Buccaneers
Jawaan Taylor	OT	Jacksonville Jaguars
Drue Tranquill	LB	Los Angeles Chargers
Chris Williams	DT	Indianapolis Colts

*Hoskins spent the 2022 season on the Chiefs' practice squad but re-signed too late for it to be a futures contract.

=== Draft ===
2023 Kansas City Chiefs draft selections
Round	Selection	Player	Position	College	Notes
1	31	Felix Anudike-Uzomah	Defensive end	Kansas State	
2	55	Rashee Rice	Wide receiver	SMU	From Vikings via Lions (Note: The Chiefs traded second-, fourth- and seventh-round selections (63rd, 122nd and 249th overall) to the Detroit Lions in exchange for second- and sixth-round selections (55th and 194th overall).)
2	63	Traded to the Detroit Lions			
3	92	Wanya Morris	Offensive tackle	Oklahoma	From Bengals (Note: The Chiefs traded third- and sixth-round selections (95th and 217th overall) to the Cincinnati Bengals in exchange for a third-round selection (92nd overall).)
3	95	Traded to the Cincinnati Bengals			
3	100	Traded to the New York Giants (Note: The Chiefs traded third- and sixth-round selections (100th and 209th overall) to the New York Giants in exchange for WR Kadarius Toney.)			2020 Resolution JC-2A selection
4	119	Chamarri Conner	Safety	Virginia Tech	From Lions via Vikings (Note: The Chiefs traded a fourth-round selection (134th overall) and a 2024 fifth-round selection to the Minnesota Vikings in exchange for a fourth-round selection (119th overall).)
4	122	Traded to the Detroit Lions			From Dolphins (Note: The Chiefs traded WR Tyreek Hill to the Miami Dolphins in exchange for fourth- and sixth-round selections (122nd and 178th overall), and 2022 first-, second- and fourth-round selections (29th, 50th and 121st overall).)
4	134	Traded to the Minnesota Vikings			
5	166	B. J. Thompson	Linebacker	Stephen F. Austin	
6	178	Traded to the Dallas Cowboys (Note: The Chiefs traded a sixth-round selection (178th overall) to the Dallas Cowboys in exchange for a 2024 fifth-round selection.)			From Bears via Dolphins
6	194	Keondre Coburn	Defensive tackle	Texas	From Lions
6	209	Traded to the New York Giants			
6	217	Traded to the Cincinnati Bengals			Compensatory selection
7	249	Traded to the Detroit Lions			
7	250	Nic Jones	Cornerback	Ball State	Compensatory selection

Draft trades

=== Undrafted free agents ===
2023 Kansas City Chiefs undrafted free agents
Name	Position	College
Ekow Boye-Doe	CB	Kansas State
Montrae Braswell	CB	Missouri State
Jerome Carvin	G	Tennessee
Anthony Cook	S	Texas
Kekoa Crawford	WR	California
Izaiah Gathings	TE	Middle Tennessee State
Jason Godrick	OT	N/A*
Kahlef Hailassie	CB	Western Kentucky
Anderson Hardy	OT	Appalachian State
Blake Haynes	OT	Tarleton State
Cam Jones	LB	Indiana
Truman Jones	DE	Harvard
Martez Manual	S	Missouri
Egawan Jennings	LB	Kent State
Isiah Moore	LB	NC State
Isiah Norman	S	Marshall
Deneric Prince	RB	Tulsa
Nikko Remigio	WR	Fresno State
Ty Scott	WR	Missouri State
Reese Taylor	CB	Purdue
Anthony Witherstone	CB	Merrimack

*Signed as a part of the International Player Pathway Program from Nigeria.

=== Signed and released in the offseason ===
Players below were signed in the offseason but were released before the start of the preseason.

2023 Kansas City Chiefs signed then released
Name	Position
Blake Haynes	T
Martez Manuel	S
Isaiah Moore	LB

== Preseason transactions ==
Transactions below occurred between the day after Chiefs first preseason game and the day before their first regular season game.

=== Preseason cuts ===
Players below were released outside of the league mandated cut date.

2023 Kansas City Chiefs cuts
Name	Position
Kekoa Crawford	WR
Anthony Witherstone	CB

=== Preseason signings ===
2023 Kansas City Chiefs signings
Name	Position
Olakunle Fatukasi	LB
Juwan Green	WR
Duron Lowe	CB
Darius Rush	CB

=== Preseason trades ===
2023 Kansas City Chiefs trades
Team	Received	Compensation
Carolina Panthers	7th-round selection 2025 NFL draft	WR Ihmir Smith-Marsette; 7th-round selection 2025 NFL Draft
Las Vegas Raiders	DT Neil Farrell Jr.	6th-round selection 2024 NFL draft

=== Cuts to 53 ===
Players below were released to reach the league mandated 53-player roster limit. The Chiefs also used a trade and reserve lists to reach the player limit. Additionally, the Chiefs waived three players with an injury designation who reverted to injured reserve after going unclaimed.

2023 Kansas City Chiefs cut to 53
Name	Position
Kendall Blanton	TE
Dicaprio Bootle	CB
Ekow Boye-Doe	CB
Shane Buechele	QB
Deon Bush	S
Matt Bushman	TE
Cole Christiansen	LB
Anthony Cook	S
Matt Dickerson	DE
Jerrion Ealy	RB/WR
Olakunle Fatukasi	LB
Ty Fryfogle	WR
Izaiah Gathings	TE
Jason Godrick	T
Juwan Green	WR
Sebastian Gutierrez	T
Kahlef Hailassie	CB
Anderson Hardy	T
Phil Hoskins	DT
Lamar Jackson	CB
Truman Jones	DE
Joshua Kaindoh	DE
Darian Kinnard	T
Duron Lowe	CB
Isiah Norman	CB
Chris Oladokun	QB
La'Mical Perine	RB
Cornell Powell	WR
Deneric Prince	RB
Austin Reiter	C
Ty Scott	WR
Danny Shelton	DT
Reese Taylor	CB
Chris Williams	DT
Daniel Wise	DE

== Regular season transactions ==
Players listed below were involved in a transaction between the Chiefs first game of the regular season and Super Bowl LVIII.

=== Suspensions served ===
2023 Kansas City Chiefs suspensions
Name	Position	Weeks served	Policy violated
Charles Omenihu	DE	1–6	Personal conduct
Justyn Ross	WR	8–14*	Personal conduct

*Justyn Ross initially was placed on the commissioner's exempt list. He was moved to the suspended list before the week 14 game after being suspended for 6 games and received credit for time he spent on the commissioner's exempt list.

=== Standard elevations ===
Players below were activated via a standard elevation prior to a game. A standard elevation is when a team temporarily activates a player from the practice squad to the active roster and allows them to send the player back to the practice squad without needing to clear waivers first.

2023 Kansas City Chiefs standard elevations
Name	Position	Week(s)
Matt Bushman	TE	1
Matt Dickerson	DE	1, 2, 18, DR
La'Mical Perine	RB	2, 9, 12
Cole Christiansen	LB	3, 4
Montrell Washington	WR	3, 12, 16
Deon Bush	S	8, 14
Deneric Prince	RB	13, 14, 15
Mike Pennel	DT	15, 16, 17, WC, DR, AG, SB
Keaontay Ingram	RB	17
Chris Oladokun	QB	18
Keith Taylor	CB	WC, AG

=== Signings ===
Players below with PS next to previous team indicates player was signed off the practice squad of the team listed

2023 Kansas City Chiefs signings
Name	Position	Previous team
Cole Christiansen	LB	Kansas City Chiefs PS
Matt Dickerson	DE	Kansas City Chiefs PS
Montrell Washington	WR	Kansas City Chiefs PS
Darius Harris	LB	Las Vegas Raiders PS
Deon Bush	S	Kansas City Chiefs PS
La'Mical Perine	RB	Kansas City Chiefs PS
Darius Harris	LB	Kansas City Chiefs PS

=== Cuts ===
2023 Kansas City Chiefs cuts
Name	Position
Darius Rush	CB
Keondre Coburn	DT
Montrell Washington	WR
Darius Harris	LB
Matt Dickerson	DT

=== Reserve list activations ===
2023 Kansas City Chiefs reserve list activations
Name	Position	Reserve list	Date added	Date activated
Chris Jones	DT	Did not report	August 29	September 16
Charles Omenihu	DE	Suspended	August 29	October 14
Richie James	WR	Injured	September 23	November 18
Nick Bolton	LB	Injured	October 28	December 9
Justyn Ross	WR	Suspended	October 27	December 11
Mecole Hardman	WR	Injured	November 25	December 30
Skyy Moore	WR	Injured	December 18	February 7
Jerick McKinnon	RB	Injured	December 24	February 10

=== Trades ===
2023 Kansas City Chiefs trades
Team	Received	Compensation
New York Jets	WR Mecole Hardman; 7th round selection 2025 NFL draft	6th round selection 2025 NFL Draft

== Staff ==
2023 Kansas City Chiefs staff
Front office: Chairman/CEO – Clark Hunt; President – Mark Donovan; General manager – Brett Veach; Assistant general manager – Mike Borgonzi; Vice president of football operations/team counsel – Chris Shea; Senior director of player personnel – Mike Bradway; Director of player personnel/pro – Tim Terry; Director of player personnel/college – Ryne Nutt; Senior personnel executive – Willie Davis; Co-directors of college scouting – Pat Sperduto and David Hinson; Head coaches: Head coach – Andy Reid; Assistant head coach/special teams coordinator – Dave Toub; Offensive coaches: Offensive coordinator – Matt Nagy; Pass game coordinator – Joe Bleymaier; Quarterbacks – David Girardi; Running backs – Todd Pinkston; Assistant running backs – Porter Ellett; Wide receivers – Connor Embree; Tight ends – Tom Melvin; Offensive line – Andy Heck; Assistant offensive line – Corey Matthaei; Offensive assistant – Kevin Saxton; Offensive quality control/assistant quarterbacks – Dan Williams	Defensive coaches: Defensive coordinator – Steve Spagnuolo; Defensive line – Joe Cullen; Assistant defensive line – Terry Bradden; Linebackers/run game coordinator – Brendan Daly; Outside linebackers – Ken Flajole; Defensive backs – Dave Merritt; Safeties – Donald D'Alesio; Defensive assistant – Rod Wilson; Defensive quality control – Alex Whittingham; Special teams coaches: Assistant special teams – Andy Hill; Strength and conditioning: Vice President of sports medicine and performance – Rick Burkholder; Head strength and conditioning/director of sports science – Ryan Reynolds; Assistant strength and conditioning – Greg Carbin; Assistant strength and conditioning – Tyler Judkins; Assistant strength and conditioning – Spencer Reid

== Final roster ==
2023 Kansas City Chiefs roster
Quarterbacks (QB): 9 Blaine Gabbert; 15 Patrick Mahomes; Running backs (RB): 25 Clyde Edwards-Helaire; 1 Jerick McKinnon; 10 Isiah Pacheco; 29 La'Mical Perine; Wide receivers (WR): 12 Mecole Hardman; 17 Richie James; 24 Skyy Moore; 4 Rashee Rice; 8 Justyn Ross; 19 Kadarius Toney; 11 Marquez Valdes-Scantling; 84 Justin Watson; Tight ends (TE): 81 Blake Bell; 83 Noah Gray; 87 Travis Kelce	Offensive linemen (OL): 73 Nick Allegretti G/C; 66 Mike Caliendo G; 52 Creed Humphrey C; 64 Wanya Morris T; 77 Lucas Niang T; 79 Donovan Smith T; 65 Trey Smith G; 74 Jawaan Taylor T; Defensive linemen (DL): 97 Felix Anudike-Uzomah DE; 51 Mike Danna DE; 92 Neil Farrell DT; 94 Malik Herring DE; 95 Chris Jones DT; 56 George Karlaftis DE; 53 B. J. Thompson DE; 98 Tershawn Wharton DT	Linebackers (LB): 32 Nick Bolton MLB; 54 Leo Chenal OLB; 48 Cole Christiansen OLB; 43 Jack Cochrane MLB/OLB; 50 Willie Gay OLB; 59 Darius Harris OLB; 23 Drue Tranquill MLB; Defensive backs (DB): 40 Ekow Boye-Doe CB; 26 Deon Bush SS; 27 Chamarri Conner SS/FS; 21 Mike Edwards FS; 31 Nic Jones CB; 22 Trent McDuffie CB; 20 Justin Reid SS; 38 L'Jarius Sneed CB; 35 Jaylen Watson CB; 2 Joshua Williams CB; Special teams (ST): 7 Harrison Butker K; 5 Tommy Townsend P; 41 James Winchester LS	Practice squad: 96 Isaiah Buggs DT; 89 Matt Bushman TE; 42 Trey Dean FS; 93 Matt Dickerson DT; 85 Izaiah Gathings TE; 72 Chukwuebuka Godrick T (IPP); 30 Keaontay Ingram RB; 57 Truman Jones DE; 75 Darian Kinnard T; 13 Chris Oladokun QB; 64 Mike Pennel DT; 14 Cornell Powell WR; 34 Deneric Prince RB; 82 Gerrit Prince TE (PS/I); 61 Austin Reiter C; 39 Keith Taylor CB; 80 Montrell Washington WR; Reserve: 6 Bryan Cook FS (IR); 88 Jody Fortson TE (IR); -- Nazeeh Johnson FS (IR); 44 Cam Jones OLB (IR); 91 Derrick Nnadi DT (IR); 90 Charles Omenihu DE (IR); -- Nikko Remigio WR (IR); 62 Joe Thuney G/T (IR); 70 Prince Tega Wanogho T (IR); Rookies in italics 53 active, 9 reserve, 15 practice squad (2 exempt)

== Preseason ==
=== Schedule ===
Week	Date	Opponent	Result	Record	Venue	Recap
1	August 13	at New Orleans Saints	L 24–26	0–1	Caesars Superdome	Recap
2	August 19	at Arizona Cardinals	W 38–10	1–1	State Farm Stadium	Recap
3	August 26	Cleveland Browns	W 33–32	2–1	Arrowhead Stadium	Recap

=== Game summaries ===
KSHB carried the preseason games in the Kansas City area. Other networks throughout the region, primarily in Missouri and Kansas, also carried the games. Broadcasters provided are the Chiefs' broadcast. The Chiefs opponents also had their own broadcast team.

==== Week 1: at New Orleans Saints ====
Week 1: Kansas City Chiefs at New Orleans Saints – Game summary

Quarter	1	2	3	4	Total
Chiefs	0	7	14	3	24
Saints	14	3	0	9	26

at Caesars Superdome, New Orleans, Louisiana

- Date: August 13
- Game time: 12:00 p.m. CDT
- Game weather: None (indoor stadium)
- Game attendance: 70,028
- Referee: Clay Martin
- TV announcers (KSHB): Ari Wolfe, Trent Green, Kimmi Chex and Matt McMullen
- Recap, Game Book

Game information

First quarter

- NO – Keith Kirkwood 4-yard pass from Derek Carr (Wil Lutz kick), 9:36. Saints 7–0. Drive: 12 plays, 80 yards, 5:24.
- NO – A. T. Perry 29-yard pass from Jameis Winston (Wil Lutz kick), 4:59. Saints 14–0. Drive: 4 plays, 48 yards, 1:47.

Second quarter

- NO – Wil Lutz 36-yard field goal, 13:45. Saints 17–0. Drive: 9 plays, 30 yards, 4:33.
- KC – Richie James 22-yard pass from Blaine Gabbert (Harrison Butker kick), 8:26. Saints 17–7. Drive: 4 plays, 50 yards, 1:41.

Third quarter

- KC – Justyn Ross 15-yard pass from Shane Buechele (Harrison Butker kick), 6:02. Saints 17–14. Drive: 5 plays, 54 yards, 2:10.
- KC – Kekoa Crawford 8-yard pass from Shane Buechele (Harrison Butker kick), 0:00. Chiefs 21–17. Drive: 9 plays, 78 yards, 3:40.

Fourth quarter

- KC – Harrison Butker 36-yard field goal, 6:17. Chiefs 24–17. Drive: 13 plays, 72 yards, 5:58.
- NO – Ellis Merriweather 2-yard pass from Jake Haener (run failed), 1:20. Chiefs 24–23. Drive: 6 plays, 76 yards, 2:02.
- NO – Blake Grupe 31-yard field goal, 0:00. Saints 26–24. Drive: 4 plays, 9 yards, 0:58.

Top passers

- KC – Shane Buechele – 11/18, 155 yards, 2 TD, INT
- NO – Jake Haener – 10/17, 105 yards, TD, INT

Top rushers

- KC – Chris Oladokun – 1 rush, 30 yards
- NO – Jamaal Williams – 9 rushes, 28 yards

Top receivers

- KC – Nikko Remigio – 4 receptions, 71 yards
- NO – A. T. Perry – 6 receptions, 70 yards, TD

==== Week 2: at Arizona Cardinals ====
Week 2: Kansas City Chiefs at Arizona Cardinals – Game summary

Quarter	1	2	3	4	Total
Chiefs	7	10	14	7	38
Cardinals	0	7	3	0	10

at State Farm Stadium, Glendale, Arizona

- Date: August 19
- Game time: 7:00 p.m. CDT/5:00 p.m. MST*
- Game weather: None (retractable roof closed)
- Game attendance: 62,190
- Referee: Craig Wrolstad
- TV announcers (KSHB): Ari Wolfe, Trent Green, Kimmi Chex and Matt McMullen
- Recap, Game Book

Game information

First quarter

- KC – Justin Watson 18-yard pass from Patrick Mahomes (Harrison Butker kick), 0:07. Chiefs 7–0. Drive: 10 plays, 92 yards, 4:45.

Second quarter

- KC – Shane Buechele 15-yard run (Harrison Butker kick), 8:59. Chiefs 14–0. Drive: 7 plays, 88 yards, 3:44.
- KC – Harrison Butker 28-yard field goal, 1:56. Chiefs 17–0. Drive: 9 plays, 60 yards, 5:20.
- ARI – Keaontay Ingram 5-yard run (Matt Prater kick), 0:06. Chiefs 17–7. Drive: 12 plays, 75 yards, 1:50.

Third quarter

- ARI – Matt Prater 54-yard field goal, 9:33. Chiefs 17–10. Drive: 11 plays, 54 yards, 5:27.
- KC – Ihmir Smith-Marsette 15-yard pass from Blaine Gabbert (Harrison Butker kick), 5:52. Chiefs 24–10. Drive: 7 plays, 85 yards, 3:41.
- KC – Cornell Powell 1-yard pass from Blaine Gabbert (Harrison Butker kick), 1:35. Chiefs 31–10. Drive: 6 plays, 71 yards, 2:40.

Fourth quarter

- KC – Deneric Prince 2-yard run (Harrison Butker kick), 3:09. Chiefs 38–10. Drive: 11 plays, 91 yards, 6:35.

Top passers

- KC – Blaine Gabbert – 7/8, 120 yards, 2 TD
- ARI – Clayton Tune – 12/24, 133 yards

Top rushers

- KC – La'Mical Perine – 6 rushes, 41 yards
- ARI – Clayton Tune – 6 rushes, 35 yards

Top receivers

- KC – Rashee Rice – 8 receptions, 96 yards
- ARI – Andre Baccellia – 2 receptions, 32 yards

==== Week 3: vs. Cleveland Browns ====
Week 3: Cleveland Browns at Kansas City Chiefs – Game summary

Quarter	1	2	3	4	Total
Browns	22	7	0	3	32
Chiefs	3	13	14	3	33

at Arrowhead Stadium, Kansas City, Missouri

- Date: August 26
- Game time: 12:00 p.m. CDT
- Game weather: 78 °F (26 °C)
- Game attendance: 73,516
- Referee: Land Clark
- TV announcers (KSHB): Ari Wolfe, Trent Green, Kimmi Chex and Matt McMullen
- Recap, Game Book

Game information

First quarter

- KC – Harrison Butker 32-yard field goal, 10:58. Chiefs 3–0. Drive: 7 plays, 28 yards, 2:44.
- CLE – Juan Thornhill 34-yard interception return (Jordan Wilkins run), 8:36. Browns 8–3.
- CLE – David Njoku 10-yard pass from Deshaun Watson (Cade York kick), 6:56. Browns 15–3. Drive: 3 plays, 16 yards, 1:15.
- CLE – John Kelly 2-yard run (Cade York kick), 1:45. Browns 22–3. Drive: 8 plays, 80 yards, 4:16.

Second quarter

- KC – Justyn Ross 3-yard pass from Shane Buechele (Harrison Butker kick), 12:13. Browns 22–10. Drive: 9 plays, 90 yards, 4:32.
- KC – La'Mical Perine 20-yard pass from Blaine Gabbert (pass failed), 1:39. Browns 22–16. Drive: 8 plays, 74 yards, 2:26.
- CLE – Caleb Biggers 27-yard interception return (Cade York kick), 0:28. Browns 29–16.

Third quarter

- KC – Ihmir Smith-Marsette 43-yard pass from Blaine Gabbert (Harrison Butker kick), 5:59. Browns 29–23. Drive: 9 plays, 89 yards, 4:07.
- KC – Matt Bushman 11-yard pass from Chris Oladokun (Justin Reid kick), 3:30. Chiefs 30–29. Drive: 3 plays, 26 yards, 1:29.

Fourth quarter

- CLE – Cade York 40-yard field goal, 4:19. Browns 32–30. Drive: 12 plays, 61 yards, 5:45.
- KC – Harrison Butker 44-yard field goal, 1:48. Chiefs 33–32. Drive: 7 plays, 49 yards, 2:31.

Top passers

- CLE – Kellen Mond – 10/19, 93 yards, INT
- KC – Blaine Gabbert – 10/18, 169 yards, 2 TD, INT

Top rushers

- CLE – John Kelly – 6 rushes, 20 yards, TD
- KC – Deneric Prince – 12 rushes, 46 yards

Top receivers

- CLE – Amari Cooper – 1 reception, 53 yards
- KC – Ihmir Smith-Marsette – 4 receptions, 101 yards, TD

*Arizona does not observe Daylight Savings Time, so from March to November the state, excluding the Navajo Nation, is aligned with Pacific Time but is still officially in the Mountain Time Zone.

== Regular season ==
=== Schedule ===
Week	Date	Opponent	Result	Record	Venue	Recap
1	September 7	Detroit Lions	**L** 20–21	0–1	Arrowhead Stadium	Recap
2	September 17	at Jacksonville Jaguars	**W** 17–9	1–1	EverBank Stadium	Recap
3	September 24	Chicago Bears	**W** 41–10	2–1	Arrowhead Stadium	Recap
4	October 1	at New York Jets	**W** 23–20	3–1	MetLife Stadium	Recap
5	October 8	at Minnesota Vikings	**W** 27–20	4–1	U.S. Bank Stadium	Recap
6	October 12	**Denver Broncos**	**W** 19–8	5–1	Arrowhead Stadium	Recap
7	October 22	**Los Angeles Chargers**	**W** 31–17	6–1	Arrowhead Stadium	Recap
8	October 29	at **Denver Broncos**	**L** 9–24	6–2	Empower Field at Mile High	Recap
9	November 5	Miami Dolphins	**W** 21–14	7–2	(Germany) Deutsche Bank Park (Frankfurt)	Recap
10	Bye					
11	November 20	Philadelphia Eagles	**L** 17–21	7–3	Arrowhead Stadium	Recap
12	November 26	at **Las Vegas Raiders**	**W** 31–17	8–3	Allegiant Stadium	Recap
13	December 3	at Green Bay Packers	**L** 19–27	8–4	Lambeau Field	Recap
14	December 10	Buffalo Bills	**L** 17–20	8–5	Arrowhead Stadium	Recap
15	December 17	at New England Patriots	**W** 27–17	9–5	Gillette Stadium	Recap
16	December 25	**Las Vegas Raiders**	**L** 14–20	9–6	Arrowhead Stadium	Recap
17	December 31	Cincinnati Bengals	**W** 25–17	10–6	Arrowhead Stadium	Recap
18	January 7	at **Los Angeles Chargers**	**W** 13–12	11–6	SoFi Stadium	Recap

Note: Intra-division opponents are in bold text.

=== Game summaries ===
==== Week 1: vs. Detroit Lions ====
NFL Kickoff Game

Week 1: Detroit Lions at Kansas City Chiefs – Game summary

Quarter	1	2	3	4	Total
**Lions**	7	0	7	7	**21**
Chiefs	0	14	3	3	**20**

at Arrowhead Stadium, Kansas City, Missouri

- Date: September 7
- Game time: 7:20 p.m. CDT
- Game weather: 83 °F (28 °C)
- Game attendance: 73,522
- Referee: John Hussey
- TV announcers (NBC): Mike Tirico, Cris Collinsworth and Melissa Stark
- Recap, Game Book

Game information

**First quarter**

- DET – Amon-Ra St. Brown 9-yard pass from Jared Goff (Riley Patterson kick), 2:46. Lions 7–0. **Drive: 14 plays, 91 yards, 8:04.**

**Second quarter**

- KC – Rashee Rice 1-yard pass from Patrick Mahomes (Harrison Butker kick), 11:50. Tied 7–7. **Drive: 13 plays, 75 yards, 5:56.**
- KC – Blake Bell 4-yard pass from Patrick Mahomes (Harrison Butker kick), 0:34. Chiefs 14–7. **Drive: 6 plays, 82 yards, 1:28.**

**Third quarter**

- DET – Brian Branch 50-yard interception return (Riley Patterson kick), 10:54. Tied 14–14.
- KC – Harrison Butker 35-yard field goal, 2:10. Chiefs 17–14. **Drive: 8 plays, 73 yards, 3:34.**

**Fourth quarter**

- KC – Harrison Butker 39-yard field goal, 12:11. Chiefs 20–14. **Drive: 8 plays, 47 yards, 4:55.**
- DET – David Montgomery 8-yard run (Riley Patterson kick), 7:06. Lions 21–20. **Drive: 9 plays, 75 yards, 5:05.**

**Top passers**

- DET – Jared Goff – 22/35, 253 yards, TD
- KC – Patrick Mahomes – 21/39, 226 yards, 2 TD, INT

**Top rushers**

- DET – David Montgomery – 21 rushes, 74 yards, TD
- KC – Patrick Mahomes – 6 rushes, 45 yards

**Top receivers**

- DET – Josh Reynolds – 4 receptions, 80 yards
- KC – Marquez Valdes-Scantling – 2 receptions, 48 yards

With the upset loss, the Chiefs started 0-1 and became the second consecutive defending Super Bowl champion to lose their season opener (after the Los Angeles Rams lost to the Buffalo Bills in Week 1 the previous season).

==== Week 2: at Jacksonville Jaguars ====
Week 2: Kansas City Chiefs at Jacksonville Jaguars – Game summary

Quarter	1	2	3	4	Total
**Chiefs**	0	7	7	3	**17**
Jaguars	0	6	0	3	**9**

at EverBank Stadium, Jacksonville, Florida

- Date: September 17
- Game time: 1:00 p.m. EDT/12:00 p.m. CDT
- Game weather: 87 °F (31 °C)
- Game attendance: 69,615
- Referee: Adrian Hill
- TV announcers (CBS): Ian Eagle, Charles Davis and Evan Washburn
- Recap, Game Book

Game information

**First quarter**

- No scoring plays.

**Second quarter**

- JAX – Brandon McManus 32-yard field goal, 12:59. Jaguars 3–0. **Drive: 4 plays, 3 yards, 1:52.**
- KC – Skyy Moore 9-yard pass from Patrick Mahomes (Harrison Butker kick), 0:27. Chiefs 7–3. **Drive: 7 plays, 50 yards, 3:37.**
- JAX – Brandon McManus 49-yard field goal, 0:00. Chiefs 7–6. **Drive: 5 plays, 44 yards, 0:27.**

**Third quarter**

- KC – Travis Kelce 9-yard pass from Patrick Mahomes (Harrison Butker kick), 11:30. Chiefs 14–6. **Drive: 7 plays, 81 yards, 3:30.**

**Fourth quarter**

- JAX – Brandon McManus 22-yard field goal, 13:43. Chiefs 14–9. **Drive: 9 plays, 73 yards, 3:16.**
- KC – Harrison Butker 38-yard field goal, 8:10. Chiefs 17–9. **Drive: 13 plays, 55 yards, 5:33.**

**Top passers**

- KC – Patrick Mahomes – 29/41, 305 yards, 2 TD, INT
- JAX – Trevor Lawrence – 22/41, 216 yards

**Top rushers**

- KC – Isiah Pacheco – 12 rushes, 70 yards
- JAX – Travis Etienne – 12 rushes, 40 yards

**Top receivers**

- KC – Sky Moore – 3 receptions, 70 yards, TD
- JAX – Christian Kirk – 11 receptions, 110 yards

With this victory Andy Reid became the winningest coach in Chiefs history with 130 wins, surpassing Hank Stram who won 129 games.

==== Week 3: vs. Chicago Bears ====
Week 3: Chicago Bears at Kansas City Chiefs – Game summary

Quarter	1	2	3	4	Total
Bears	0	0	0	10	**10**
**Chiefs**	7	27	7	0	**41**

at Arrowhead Stadium, Kansas City, Missouri

- Date: September 24
- Game time: 3:25 p.m. CDT
- Game weather: 82 °F (28 °C)
- Game attendance: 73,562
- Referee: Alan Eck
- TV announcers (Fox): Kevin Burkhardt, Greg Olsen, Erin Andrews and Tom Rinaldi
- Recap, Game Book

Game information

**First quarter**

- KC – Jerick McKinnon 6-yard pass from Patrick Mahomes (Harrison Butker kick), 6:51. Chiefs 7–0. **Drive: 6 plays, 59 yards, 2:45.**

**Second quarter**

- KC – Clyde Edwards-Helaire 1-yard run (Harrison Butker kick), 11:34. Chiefs 14–0. **Drive: 11 plays, 80 yards, 5:57.**
- KC – Jerick McKinnon 3-yard pass from Patrick Mahomes (Harrison Butker kick), 3:05. Chiefs 21–0. **Drive: 11 plays, 88 yards, 5:24.**
- KC – Harrison Butker 41-yard field goal, 1:51. Chiefs 24–0. **Drive: 4 plays, 3 yards, 1:06.**
- KC – Isiah Pacheco 1-yard run (Harrison Butker kick), 1:06. Chiefs 31–0. **Drive: 3 plays, 26 yards, 0:31.**
- KC – Harrison Butker 38-yard field goal, 0:00. Chiefs 34–0. **Drive: 5 plays, 45 yards, 0:35.**

**Third quarter**

- KC – Travis Kelce 3-yard pass from Patrick Mahomes (Harrison Butker kick), 7:04. Chiefs 41–0. **Drive: 11 plays, 64 yards, 5:14.**

**Fourth quarter**

- CHI – Cairo Santos 21-yard field goal, 13:34. Chiefs 41–3. **Drive: 11 plays, 25 yards, 4:42.**
- CHI – D. J. Moore 9-yard pass from Justin Fields (Cairo Santos kick), 4:20. Chiefs 41–10. **Drive: 9 plays, 75 yards, 2:49.**

**Top passers**

- CHI – Justin Fields – 11/22, 99 yards, TD, INT
- KC – Patrick Mahomes – 24/33, 272 yards, 3 TD

**Top rushers**

- CHI – Justin Fields – 11 rushes, 47 yards
- KC – Isiah Pacheco – 15 rushes, 62 yards, TD

**Top receivers**

- CHI – D. J. Moore – 3 receptions, 41 yards, TD
- KC – Travis Kelce – 7 receptions, 69 yards, TD

With the dominant win, the Chiefs improved to 2-1.

==== Week 4: at New York Jets ====
Week 4: Kansas City Chiefs at New York Jets – Game summary

Quarter	1	2	3	4	Total
**Chiefs**	17	3	0	3	**23**
Jets	0	12	8	0	**20**

at MetLife Stadium, East Rutherford, New Jersey

- Date: October 1
- Game time: 8:20 p.m. EDT/7:20 p.m. CDT
- Game weather: Clear, 69 °F (21 °C)
- Game attendance: 80,461
- Referee: Alex Kemp
- TV announcers (NBC): Mike Tirico, Cris Collinsworth, and Melissa Stark
- Recap, Game Book

Game information

**First quarter**

- KC – Harrison Butker 37-yard field goal, 11:35. Chiefs 3–0. **Drive: 8 plays, 57 yards, 3:25.**
- KC – Isiah Pacheco 48-yard run (Harrison Butker kick), 8:32. Chiefs 10–0. **Drive: 5 plays, 69 yards, 2:03.**
- KC – Noah Gray 34-yard pass from Patrick Mahomes (Harrison Butker kick), 3:24. Chiefs 17–0. **Drive: 6 plays, 89 yards, 2:48.**

**Second quarter**

- NYJ – Penalty on Jawaan Taylor enforced in end zone for a Safety, 13:20. Chiefs 17–2.
- NYJ – Greg Zuerlein 31-yard field goal, 9:50. Chiefs 17–5. **Drive: 7 plays, 62 yards, 3:30.**
- NYJ – C. J. Uzomah 1-yard pass from Zach Wilson (Greg Zuerlein kick), 6:26. Chiefs 17–12. **Drive: 7 plays, 41 yards, 3:16.**
- KC – Harrison Butker 37-yard field goal, 2:15. Chiefs 20–12. **Drive: 10 plays, 56 yards, 4:11.**

**Third quarter**

- NYJ – Allen Lazard 10-yard pass from Zach Wilson (Zach Wilson run), 10:40. Tied 20–20. **Drive: 7 plays, 75 yards, 4:20.**

**Fourth quarter**

- KC – Harrison Butker 26-yard field goal, 10:51. Chiefs 23–20. **Drive: 14 plays, 80 yards, 7:23.**

**Top passers**

- KC – Patrick Mahomes – 18/30, 203 yards, TD, 2 INT
- NYJ – Zach Wilson – 28/39, 245 yards, 2 TD

**Top rushers**

- KC – Isiah Pacheco – 20 rushes, 115 yards, TD
- NYJ – Breece Hall – 6 rushes, 56 yards

**Top receivers**

- KC – Travis Kelce – 6 receptions, 60 yards
- NYJ – Allen Lazard – 3 receptions, 61 yards, TD

The Chiefs jumped out to a 17-0 lead, and while the Jets tied the game at 20-20, the Chiefs took a 23-20 lead and were able to bleed out the clock off a questionable defensive holding call on Sauce Gardner.

In Taylor Swift's second Chiefs game visiting, over 27 million people watched, the most watched Sunday TV show since Super Bowl LVII.

==== Week 5: at Minnesota Vikings ====
Week 5: Kansas City Chiefs at Minnesota Vikings – Game summary

Quarter	1	2	3	4	Total
**Chiefs**	7	6	14	0	**27**
Vikings	3	10	0	7	**20**

at U.S. Bank Stadium, Minneapolis, Minnesota

- Date: October 8
- Game time: 3:25 p.m. CDT
- Game weather: None (indoor stadium)
- Game attendance: 67,003
- Referee: Land Clark
- TV announcers (CBS): Jim Nantz, Tony Romo and Tracy Wolfson
- Recap, Game Book

Game information

**First quarter**

- KC – Isiah Pacheco 1-yard run (Harrison Butker kick), 10:00. Chiefs 7–0. **Drive: 9 plays, 45 yards, 4:50.**
- MIN – Greg Joseph 40-yard field goal, 4:02. Chiefs 7–3. **Drive: 14 plays, 53 yards, 5:58.**

**Second quarter**

- KC – Harrison Butker 38-yard field goal, 12:46. Chiefs 10–3. **Drive: 12 plays, 55 yards, 6:16.**
- MIN – Greg Joseph 29-yard field goal, 8:02. Chiefs 10–6. **Drive: 9 plays, 64 yards, 4:44.**
- MIN – Jordan Addison 6-yard pass from Kirk Cousins (Greg Joseph kick), 1:39. Vikings 13–10. **Drive: 12 plays, 56 yards, 5:24.**
- KC – Harrison Butker 40-yard field goal, 0:00. Tied 13–13. **Drive: 10 plays, 53 yards, 1:39.**

**Third quarter**

- KC – Rashee Rice 8-yard pass from Patrick Mahomes (Harrison Butker kick), 10:10. Chiefs 20–13. **Drive: 11 plays, 75 yards, 4:50.**
- KC – Travis Kelce 4-yard pass from Patrick Mahomes (Harrison Butker kick), 2:45. Chiefs 27–13. **Drive: 11 plays, 74 yards, 6:27.**

**Fourth quarter**

- MIN – Alexander Mattison 9-yard pass from Kirk Cousins (Greg Joesph kick), 12:11. Chiefs 27–20. **Drive: 14 plays, 75 yards, 5:34.**

**Top passers**

- KC – Patrick Mahomes – 31/41, 281 yards, 2 TD
- MIN – Kirk Cousins – 29/47, 284 yards, 2 TD

**Top rushers**

- KC – Isiah Pacheco – 16 rushes, 56 yards, TD
- MIN – Alexander Mattison – 8 rushes, 26 yards

**Top receivers**

- KC – Travis Kelce – 10 receptions, 67 yards, TD
- MIN – Jordan Addison – 6 receptions, 64 yards, TD

With the win, the Chiefs improved to 4-1.

==== Week 6: vs. Denver Broncos ====
Week 6: Denver Broncos at Kansas City Chiefs – Game summary

Quarter	1	2	3	4	Total
Broncos	0	0	0	8	**8**
**Chiefs**	3	10	3	3	**19**

at Arrowhead Stadium, Kansas City, Missouri

- Date: October 12
- Game time: 7:15 p.m. CDT
- Game weather: 62 °F (17 °C)
- Game attendance: 73,528
- Referee: Shawn Hochuli
- TV announcers (KSHB): Al Michaels, Kirk Herbstreit and Kaylee Hartung
- Recap, Game Book

Game information

**First quarter**

- KC – Harrison Butker 35-yard field goal, 5:40. Chiefs 3–0. **Drive: 9 plays, 42 yards, 3:44.**

**Second quarter**

- KC – Kadarius Toney 3-yard pass from Patrick Mahomes (Harrison Butker kick), 3:06. Chiefs 10–0. **Drive: 7 plays, 62 yards, 3:22.**
- KC – Harrison Butker 60-yard field goal, 0:00. Chiefs 13–0. **Drive: 3 plays, 19 yards, 0:15.**

**Third quarter**

- KC – Harrison Butker 25-yard field goal, 9:16. Chiefs 16–0. **Drive: 12 plays, 68 yards, 5:44.**

**Fourth quarter**

- DEN – Courtland Sutton 11-yard pass from Russell Wilson (Javonte Williams run), 6:07. Chiefs 16–8. **Drive: 6 plays, 61 yards, 3:15.**
- KC – Harrison Butker 52-yard field goal, 1:59. Chiefs 19–8. **Drive: 9 plays, 41 yards, 4:08.**

**Top passers**

- DEN – Russell Wilson – 13/22, 95 yards, TD, 2 INT
- KC – Patrick Mahomes – 30/40, 306 yards, TD, INT

**Top rushers**

- DEN – Javonte Williams – 10 rushes, 52 yards
- KC – Isiah Pacheco – 16 rushes, 62 yards

**Top receivers**

- DEN – Courtland Sutton – 4 receptions, 46 yards, TD
- KC – Travis Kelce – 9 receptions, 124 yards

With the win (their 16th consecutive over the Broncos), they improve to 5-1.

==== Week 7: vs. Los Angeles Chargers ====
Week 7: Los Angeles Chargers at Kansas City Chiefs – Game summary

Quarter	1	2	3	4	Total
Chargers	3	14	0	0	**17**
**Chiefs**	3	21	0	7	**31**

at Arrowhead Stadium, Kansas City, Missouri

- Date: October 22
- Game time: 3:25 p.m. CDT
- Game weather: 72 °F (22 °C)
- Game attendance: 73,642
- Referee: Tra Blake
- TV announcers (CBS): Jim Nantz, Tony Romo and Tracy Wolfson
- Recap, Game Book

Game information

**First quarter**

- KC – Harrison Butker 35-yard field goal, 6:49. Chiefs 3–0. **Drive: 11 plays, 66 yards, 5:10.**
- LAC – Cameron Dicker 55-yard field goal, 1:48. Tied 3–3. **Drive: 10 plays, 38 yards, 5:01.**

**Second quarter**

- KC – Marquez Valdes-Scantling 46-yard pass from Patrick Mahomes (Harrison Butker kick), 14:11. Chiefs 10–3. **Drive: 5 plays, 75 yards, 2:37.**
- LAC – Joshua Kelley 49-yard run (Cameron Dicker kick), 10:42. Tied 10–10. **Drive: 6 plays, 75 yards, 3:29.**
- KC – Rashee Rice 6-yard pass from Patrick Mahomes (Harrison Butker kick), 8:37. Chiefs 17–10. **Drive: 4 plays, 75 yards, 2:05.**
- LAC – Gerald Everett 7-yard pass from Justin Herbert (Cameron Dicker kick), 7:06. Tied 17–17. **Drive: 5 plays, 75 yards, 1:31.**
- KC – Travis Kelce 1-yard pass from Patrick Mahomes (Harrison Butker kick), 0:15. Chiefs 24–17. **Drive: 6 plays, 96 yards, 2:33.**

**Third quarter**

- No scoring plays.

**Fourth quarter**

- KC – Isiah Pacheco 8-yard pass from Patrick Mahomes (Harrison Butker kick), 3:30. Chiefs 31–17. **Drive: 6 plays, 35 yards, 2:46.**

**Top passers**

- LAC – Justin Herbert – 17/30, 259 yards, TD, 2 INT
- KC – Patrick Mahomes – 32/42, 424 yards, 4 TD, INT

**Top rushers**

- LAC – Joshua Kelley – 7 rushes, 75 yards, TD
- KC – Isiah Pacheco – 13 rushes, 32 yards

**Top receivers**

- LAC – Josh Palmer – 5 receptions, 133 yards
- KC – Travis Kelce – 12 receptions, 179 yards, TD

The Chiefs improve to 6-1 with the win.

==== Week 8: at Denver Broncos ====
Week 8: Kansas City Chiefs at Denver Broncos – Game summary

Quarter	1	2	3	4	Total
Chiefs	3	6	0	0	**9**
**Broncos**	7	7	0	10	**24**

at Empower Field at Mile High, Denver, Colorado

- Date: October 29
- Game time: 3:25 p.m. CDT/2:25 p.m. MDT
- Game weather: Cold, getting colder, a few light flakes of snow falling, 26 °F (−3 °C)
- Game attendance: 76,286
- Referee: Brad Allen
- TV announcers (CBS): Kevin Harlan, Trent Green and Melanie Collins
- Recap, Game Book

Game information

**First quarter**

- DEN – Javonte Williams 4-yard pass from Russell Wilson (Wil Lutz kick), 7:56. Broncos 7–0. **Drive: 10 plays, 39 yards, 5:20.**
- KC – Harrison Butker 23-yard field goal, 1:11. Broncos 7–3. **Drive: 12 plays, 71 yards, 6:45.**

**Second quarter**

- DEN – Jerry Jeudy 11-yard pass from Russell Wilson (Wil Lutz kick), 11:51. Broncos 14–3. **Drive: 3 plays, 50 yards, 1:12.**
- KC – Harrison Butker 34-yard field goal, 5:39. Broncos 14–6. **Drive: 5 plays, 44 yards, 2:47.**
- KC – Harrison Butker 56-yard field goal, 0:00. Broncos 14–9. **Drive: 2 plays, 11 yards, 0:09.**

**Third quarter**

- No scoring plays.

**Fourth quarter**

- DEN – Courtland Sutton 6-yard pass from Russell Wilson (Wil Lutz kick), 10:33. Broncos 21–9. **Drive: 13 plays, 65 yards, 7:12.**
- DEN – Wil Lutz 28-yard field goal, 0:31. Broncos 24–9. **Drive: 7 plays, 10 yards, 4:14.**

**Top passers**

- KC – Patrick Mahomes – 24/38, 241 yards, 2 INT
- DEN – Russell Wilson – 12/19, 114 yards, 3 TD

**Top rushers**

- KC – Isiah Pacheco – 8 rushes, 40 yards
- DEN – Javonte Williams – 27 rushes, 85 yards

**Top receivers**

- KC – Travis Kelce – 6 receptions, 58 yards
- DEN – Jerry Jeudy – 2 receptions, 50 yards, TD

This was the first time since week 2 of the 2015 season that the Chiefs lost to the Broncos, and this was also Patrick Mahomes' first ever loss to the Broncos in his career.

==== Week 9: vs. Miami Dolphins ====
NFL Germany games

Week 9: Miami Dolphins at Kansas City Chiefs – Game summary

Quarter	1	2	3	4	Total
Dolphins	0	0	14	0	**14**
**Chiefs**	7	14	0	0	**21**

at Deutsche Bank Park, Frankfurt, Hesse, Germany

- Date: November 5
- Game time: 3:30 p.m. CET/8:30 a.m. CST
- Game weather: Light rain, 53 °F (12 °C)
- Game attendance: 50,023
- Referee: Clay Martin
- TV announcers (KSHB): Rich Eisen, Jason McCourty, Dan Orlovsky, Stacey Dales and Sara Walsh
- Recap, Game Book

Game information

**First quarter**

- KC – Rashee Rice 11-yard pass from Patrick Mahomes (Harrison Butker kick), 12:03. Chiefs 7–0. **Drive: 7 plays, 75 yards, 2:57.**

**Second quarter**

- KC – Jerick McKinnon 17-yard pass from Patrick Mahomes (Harrison Butker kick), 2:31. Chiefs 14–0. **Drive: 13 plays, 95 yards, 8:28.**
- KC – Bryan Cook 59-yard fumble return (Harrison Butker kick), 0:33. Chiefs 21–0.

**Third quarter**

- MIA – Cedrick Wilson Jr. 31-yard pass from Tua Tagovailoa (Jason Sanders kick), 4:47. Chiefs 21–7. **Drive: 8 plays, 80 yards, 5:10.**
- MIA – Raheem Mostert 13-yard run (Jason Sanders kick), 0:22. Chiefs 21–14. **Drive: 4 plays, 27 yards, 1:50.**

**Fourth quarter**

- No scoring plays.

**Top passers**

- MIA – Tua Tagovailoa – 21/34, 193 yards, TD
- KC – Patrick Mahomes – 20/30, 185 yards, 2 TD

**Top rushers**

- MIA – Raheem Mostert – 12 rushes, 85 yards, TD
- KC – Isiah Pacheco – 16 rushes, 66 yards

**Top receivers**

- MIA – Tyreek Hill – 8 receptions, 62 yards
- KC – Noah Gray – 3 receptions, 34 yards

With the win, the Chiefs improve to 7-2.

==== Week 11: vs. Philadelphia Eagles ====
Week 11: Philadelphia Eagles at Kansas City Chiefs – Game summary

Quarter	1	2	3	4	Total
**Eagles**	7	0	7	7	**21**
Chiefs	7	10	0	0	**17**

at Arrowhead Stadium, Kansas City, Missouri

- Date: November 20
- Game time: 7:15 p.m. CST
- Game weather: 45 °F (7 °C)
- Game attendance: 73,754
- Referee: Shawn Smith
- TV announcers (ESPN/ABC/ESPN+): Joe Buck, Troy Aikman, Lisa Salters and Laura Rutledge
- Recap, Game Book

Game information

**First quarter**

- KC – Justin Watson 3-yard pass from Patrick Mahomes (Harrison Butker kick), 5:34. Chiefs 7–0. **Drive: 10 plays, 80 yards, 5:43.**
- PHI – D'Andre Swift 4-yard run (Jake Elliott kick), 0:31. Tied 7–7. **Drive: 9 plays, 75 yards, 5:03.**

**Second quarter**

- KC – Travis Kelce 4-yard pass from Patrick Mahomes (Harrison Butker kick), 1:45. Chiefs 14–7. **Drive: 7 plays, 45 yards, 2:04.**
- KC – Harrison Butker 43-yard field goal, 0:00. Chiefs 17–7. **Drive: 6 plays, 21 yards, 0:44.**

**Third quarter**

- PHI – Jalen Hurts 10-yard run (Jake Elliott kick), 4:05. Chiefs 17–14. **Drive: 7 plays, 61 yards, 2:53.**

**Fourth quarter**

- PHI – Jalen Hurts 1-yard run (Jake Elliott kick), 6:20. Eagles 21–17. **Drive: 7 plays, 80 yards, 2:36.**

**Top passers**

- PHI – Jalen Hurts – 14/22, 150 yards, INT
- KC – Patrick Mahomes – 24/43, 177 yards, 2 TD, INT

**Top rushers**

- PHI – D'Andre Swift – 12 rushes, 76 yards, TD
- KC – Isiah Pacheco – 19 rushes, 89 yards

**Top receivers**

- PHI – DeVonta Smith – 6 receptions, 99 yards
- KC – Justin Watson – 5 receptions, 53 yards, TD

With the loss, the Chiefs fall to 7-3.

==== Week 12: at Las Vegas Raiders ====
Week 12: Kansas City Chiefs at Las Vegas Raiders – Game summary

Quarter	1	2	3	4	Total
**Chiefs**	0	14	7	10	**31**
Raiders	7	7	3	0	**17**

at Allegiant Stadium, Paradise, Nevada

- Date: November 26
- Game time: 3:25 p.m. CST/1:25 p.m. PST
- Game weather: None (indoor stadium)
- Game attendance: 62,441
- Referee: Land Clark
- TV announcers (CBS): Kevin Harlan, Trent Green and Melanie Collins
- Recap, Game Book

Game information

**First quarter**

- LV – Jakobi Meyers 18-yard pass from Aidan O'Connell (Daniel Carlson kick), 9:32. Raiders 7–0. **Drive: 9 plays, 75 yards, 5:28.**

**Second quarter**

- LV – Josh Jacobs 63-yard run (Daniel Carlson kick), 12:41. Raiders 14–0. **Drive: 2 plays, 77 yards, 0:42.**
- KC – Isiah Pacheco 1-yard run (Harrison Butker kick), 6:38. Raiders 14–7. **Drive: 12 plays, 71 yards, 6:03.**
- KC – Justin Watson 3-yard pass from Patrick Mahomes (Harrison Butker kick), 0:25. Tied 14–14. **Drive: 8 plays, 79 yards, 3:12.**

**Third quarter**

- KC – Isiah Pacheco 1-yard run (Harrison Butker kick), 9:15. Chiefs 21–14. **Drive: 10 plays, 75 yards, 5:45.**
- LV – Daniel Carlson 34-yard field goal, 2:09. Chiefs 21–17. **Drive: 8 plays, 60 yards, 4:05.**

**Fourth quarter**

- KC – Rashee Rice 39-yard pass from Patrick Mahomes (Harrison Butker kick), 13:40. Chiefs 28–17. **Drive: 6 plays, 75 yards, 3:29.**
- KC – Harrison Butker 32-yard field goal, 3:11. Chiefs 31–17. **Drive: 6 plays, 3 yards, 2:18.**

**Top passers**

- KC – Patrick Mahomes – 27/34, 298 yards, 2 TD
- LV – Aidan O'Connell – 23/33, 248 yards, TD

**Top rushers**

- KC – Isiah Pacheco – 15 rushes, 55 yards, 2 TD
- LV – Josh Jacobs – 20 rushes, 110 yards, TD

**Top receivers**

- KC – Rashee Rice – 8 receptions, 107 yards, TD
- LV – Jakobi Meyers – 6 receptions, 79 yards, TD

With the win, the Chiefs improve to 8-3.

==== Week 13: at Green Bay Packers ====
Week 13: Kansas City Chiefs at Green Bay Packers – Game summary

Quarter	1	2	3	4	Total
Chiefs	3	3	6	7	**19**
**Packers**	7	7	7	6	**27**

at Lambeau Field, Green Bay, Wisconsin

- Date: December 3
- Game time: 7:20 p.m. CST
- Game weather: Cloudy, 31 °F (−1 °C)
- Game attendance: 78,124
- Referee: Brad Allen
- TV announcers (NBC): Mike Tirico, Cris Collinsworth and Melissa Stark
- Recap, Game Book

Game information

**First quarter**

- GB – Ben Sims 1-yard pass from Jordan Love (Anders Carlson kick), 7:13. Packers 7–0. **Drive: 13 plays, 75 yards, 7:47.**
- KC – Harrison Butker 34-yard field goal, 0:00. Packers 7–3. **Drive: 13 plays, 60 yards, 7:13.**

**Second quarter**

- GB – Christian Watson 9-yard pass from Jordan Love (Anders Carlson kick), 10:39. Packers 14–3. **Drive: 8 plays, 75 yards, 4:21.**
- KC – Harrison Butker 34-yard field goal, 2:19. Packers 14–6. **Drive: 14 plays, 59 yards, 8:20.**

**Third quarter**

- KC – Isiah Pacheco 1-yard run (run failed), 9:39. Packers 14–12. **Drive: 9 plays, 75 yards, 5:21.**
- GB – Christian Watson 12-yard pass from Jordan Love (Anders Carlson kick), 5:23. Packers 21–12. **Drive: 7 plays, 67 yards, 4:16.**

**Fourth quarter**

- KC – Noah Gray 2-yard pass from Patrick Mahomes (Harrison Butker kick), 14:51. Packers 21–19. **Drive: 11 plays, 66 yards, 5:32.**
- GB – Anders Carlson 40-yard field goal, 6:03. Packers 24–19. **Drive: 11 plays, 55 yards, 4:38.**
- GB – Anders Carlson 48-yard field goal, 1:09. Packers 27–19. **Drive: 11 plays, 35 yards, 4:05.**

**Top passers**

- KC – Patrick Mahomes – 21/33, 210 yards, TD, INT
- GB – Jordan Love – 25/36, 267 yards, 3 TD

**Top rushers**

- KC – Isiah Pacheco – 18 rushes, 110 yards, TD
- GB – A. J. Dillon – 18 rushes, 73 yards

**Top receivers**

- KC – Travis Kelce – 4 receptions, 81 yards
- GB – Romeo Doubs – 4 receptions, 72 yards

With the upset loss, the Chiefs fall to 8-4.

==== Week 14: vs. Buffalo Bills ====
Week 14: Buffalo Bills at Kansas City Chiefs – Game summary

Quarter	1	2	3	4	Total
**Bills**	7	7	3	3	**20**
Chiefs	0	7	7	3	**17**

at Arrowhead Stadium, Kansas City, Missouri

- Date: December 10
- Game time: 3:25 p.m. CST
- Game weather: 45 °F (7 °C)
- Game attendance: 73,639
- Referee: Carl Cheffers
- TV announcers (CBS): Jim Nantz, Tony Romo and Tracy Wolfson
- Recap, Game Book

Game information

**First quarter**

- BUF – James Cook 25-yard pass from Josh Allen (Tyler Bass kick), 3:43. Bills 7–0. **Drive: 6 plays, 53 yards, 3:24.**

**Second quarter**

- BUF – Josh Allen 6-yard run (Tyler Bass kick), 11:50. Bills 14–0. **Drive: 12 plays, 73 yards, 5:29.**
- KC – Jerick McKinnon 7-yard run (Harrison Butker kick), 1:19. Bills 14–7. **Drive: 9 plays, 52 yards, 2:17.**

**Third quarter**

- BUF – Tyler Bass 31-yard field goal, 8:38. Bills 17–7. **Drive: 10 plays, 62 yards, 6:22.**
- KC – Rashee Rice 4-yard pass from Patrick Mahomes (Harrison Butker kick), 3:30. Bills 17–14. **Drive: 9 plays, 75 yards, 5:08.**

**Fourth quarter**

- KC – Harrison Butker 27-yard field goal, 11:31. Tied 17–17. **Drive: 8 plays, 49 yards, 3:15.**
- BUF – Tyler Bass 39-yard field goal, 1:54. Bills 20–17. **Drive: 12 plays, 48 yards, 5:03.**

**Top passers**

- BUF – Josh Allen – 23/42, 233 yards, TD, INT
- KC – Patrick Mahomes – 25/43, 271 yards, TD, INT

**Top rushers**

- BUF – James Cook – 10 rushes, 58 yards
- KC – Clyde Edwards-Helaire – 11 rushes, 39 yards

**Top receivers**

- BUF – James Cook – 5 receptions, 83 yards, TD
- KC – Travis Kelce – 6 receptions, 83 yards

Late in the fourth quarter, a Kadarius Toney touchdown was negated due to Toney lining up offsides. With their second straight loss, the Chiefs fall to 8-5.

==== Week 15: at New England Patriots ====
Week 15: Kansas City Chiefs at New England Patriots – Game summary

Quarter	1	2	3	4	Total
**Chiefs**	7	7	13	0	**27**
Patriots	0	10	0	7	**17**

at Gillette Stadium, Foxborough, Massachusetts

- Date: December 17
- Game time: 1:00 p.m. EST/12:00 p.m. CST
- Game weather: Cloudy and cool, 53 °F (12 °C)
- Game attendance: 64,628
- Referee: Shawn Hochuli
- TV announcers (Fox): Joe Davis, Daryl Johnston and Pam Oliver
- Recap, Game Book

Game information

**First quarter**

- KC – Rashee Rice 4-yard pass from Jerick McKinnon (Harrison Butker kick), 1:30. Chiefs 7–0. **Drive: 4 plays, 69 yards, 2:05.**

**Second quarter**

- NE – Hunter Henry 16-yard pass from Bailey Zappe (Chad Ryland kick), 7:09. Tied 7–7. **Drive: 10 plays, 61 yards, 5:47.**
- NE – Chad Ryland 25-yard field goal, 4:47. Patriots 10–7. **Drive: 4 plays, 1 yard, 2:10.**
- KC – Jerick McKinnon 8-yard pass from Patrick Mahomes (Harrison Butker kick), 0:35. Chiefs 14–10. **Drive: 11 plays, 75 yards, 4:12.**

**Third quarter**

- KC – Harrison Butker 29-yard field goal, 10:29. Chiefs 17–10. **Drive: 11 plays, 64 yards, 4:31.**
- KC – Clyde Edwards-Helaire 6-yard pass from Patrick Mahomes (Harrison Butker kick), 9:22. Chiefs 24–10. **Drive: 2 plays, 7 yards, 0:49.**
- KC – Harrison Butker 54-yard field goal, 3:40. Chiefs 27–10. **Drive: 6 plays, 39 yards, 2:53.**

**Fourth quarter**

- NE – Kevin Harris 18-yard run (Chad Ryland kick), 8:24. Chiefs 27–17. **Drive: 2 plays, 29 yards, 0:44.**

**Top passers**

- KC – Patrick Mahomes – 27/37, 305 yards, 2 TD, 2 INT
- NE – Bailey Zappe – 23/31, 180 yards, TD, INT

**Top rushers**

- KC – Clyde Edwards-Helaire – 13 rushes, 37 yards
- NE – Ezekiel Elliott – 11 rushes, 25 yards

**Top receivers**

- KC – Rashee Rice – 9 receptions, 91 yards, TD
- NE – Hunter Henry – 7 receptions, 66 yards, TD

With the win, the Chiefs improve to 9-5.

==== Week 16: vs. Las Vegas Raiders ====
Christmas Day games

Week 16: Las Vegas Raiders at Kansas City Chiefs – Game summary

Quarter	1	2	3	4	Total
**Raiders**	3	14	3	0	**20**
Chiefs	0	7	0	7	**14**

at Arrowhead Stadium, Kansas City, Missouri

- Date: December 25
- Game time: 12:00 p.m. CST
- Game weather: 38 °F (3 °C)
- Game attendance: 73,480
- Referee: Clete Blakeman
- TV announcers (CBS/Nick): Jim Nantz, Tony Romo and Tracy Wolfson (CBS)
  Noah Eagle, Nate Burleson, Dylan Schefter, Brady Noon (as Raphael) and Micah Abbey (as Donatello) (Nickelodeon)
- Recap, Game Book

Game information

**First quarter**

- LV – Daniel Carlson 24-yard field goal, 1:18. Raiders 3–0. **Drive: 15 plays, 87 yards, 4:44.**

**Second quarter**

- KC – Isiah Pacheco 12-yard run (Harrison Butker kick), 7:34. Chiefs 7–3. **Drive: 10 plays, 74 yards, 5:21.**
- LV – Bilal Nichols 8-yard fumble return (run failed), 4:55. Raiders 9–7.
- LV – Jack Jones 33-yard interception return (Brandon Bolden run), 4:48. Raiders 17–7.

**Third quarter**

- LV – Daniel Carlson 35-yard field goal, 0:24. Raiders 20–7. **Drive: 7 plays, 25 yards, 2:23.**

**Fourth quarter**

- KC – Justin Watson 7-yard pass from Patrick Mahomes (Harrison Butker kick), 2:42. Raiders 20–14. **Drive: 9 plays, 69 yards, 3:23.**

**Top passers**

- LV – Aidan O'Connell – 9/21, 62 yards
- KC – Patrick Mahomes – 27/44, 235 yards, TD, INT

**Top rushers**

- LV – Zamir White – 22 rushes, 145 yards
- KC – Patrick Mahomes – 10 rushes, 53 yards

**Top receivers**

- LV – Jakobi Meyers – 3 receptions, 42 yards
- KC – Rashee Rice – 6 receptions, 57 yards

With the upset loss, the Chiefs fall to 9-6.

==== Week 17: vs. Cincinnati Bengals ====
Week 17: Cincinnati Bengals at Kansas City Chiefs – Game summary

Quarter	1	2	3	4	Total
Bengals	3	14	0	0	**17**
**Chiefs**	7	6	3	9	**25**

at Arrowhead Stadium, Kansas City, Missouri

- Date: December 31
- Game time: 3:25 p.m. CST
- Game weather: 36 °F (2 °C)
- Game attendance: 73,565
- Referee: John Hussey
- TV announcers (CBS): Jim Nantz, Tony Romo and Tracy Wolfson
- Recap, Game Book

Game information

**First quarter**

- CIN – Evan McPherson 34-yard field goal, 6:21. Bengals 3–0. **Drive: 15 plays, 59 yards, 8:39.**
- KC – Isiah Pacheco 8-yard pass from Patrick Mahomes (Harrison Butker kick), 2:58. Chiefs 7–3. **Drive: 7 plays, 75 yards, 3:23.**

**Second quarter**

- CIN – Joe Mixon 7-yard pass from Jake Browning (Evan McPherson kick), 11:29. Bengals 10–7. **Drive: 11 plays, 75 yards, 6:29.**
- CIN – Jake Browning 1-yard run (Evan McPherson kick), 6:23. Bengals 17–7. **Drive: 8 plays, 24 yards, 4:23.**
- KC – Harrison Butker 54-yard field goal, 3:44. Bengals 17–10. **Drive: 6 plays, 40 yards, 2:39.**
- KC – Harrison Butker 43-yard field goal, 0:35. Bengals 17–13. **Drive: 5 plays, 44 yards, 1:25.**

**Third quarter**

- KC – Harrison Butker 27-yard field goal, 4:31. Bengals 17–16. **Drive: 9 plays, 82 yards, 3:12.**

**Fourth quarter**

- KC – Harrison Butker 24-yard field goal, 14:09. Chiefs 19–17. **Drive: 7 plays, 85 yards, 3:30.**
- KC – Harrison Butker 48-yard field goal, 6:18. Chiefs 22–17. **Drive: 13 plays, 39 yards, 6:49.**
- KC – Harrison Butker 46-yard field goal, 2:59. Chiefs 25–17. **Drive: 4 plays, 9 yards, 1:34.**

**Top passers**

- CIN – Jake Browning – 19/33, 197 yards, TD
- KC – Patrick Mahomes – 21/29, 245 yards, TD

**Top rushers**

- CIN – Joe Mixon – 21 rushes, 65 yards
- KC – Isiah Pacheco – 18 rushes, 130 yards

**Top receivers**

- CIN – Ja'Marr Chase – 3 receptions, 41 yards
- KC – Rashee Rice – 5 receptions, 127 yards

With the win, the Chiefs improve to 10-6 and clinch the AFC West for the 8th consecutive season.

==== Week 18: at Los Angeles Chargers ====
Week 18: Kansas City Chiefs at Los Angeles Chargers – Game summary

Quarter	1	2	3	4	Total
**Chiefs**	7	3	0	3	**13**
Chargers	0	6	3	3	**12**

at SoFi Stadium, Inglewood, California

- Date: January 7
- Game time: 3:25 p.m. CST/1:25 p.m. PST
- Game weather: None (indoor stadium)
- Game attendance: 68,274
- Referee: Scott Novak
- TV announcers (CBS): Spero Dedes, Adam Archuleta and Aditi Kinkhabwala
- Recap, Game Book

Game information

**First quarter**

- KC – Mike Edwards 97-yard fumble return (Harrison Butker kick), 4:56. Chiefs 7–0.

**Second quarter**

- KC – Harrison Butker 22-yard field goal, 4:03. Chiefs 10–0. **Drive: 12 plays, 66 yards, 5:35.**
- LAC – Cameron Dicker 49-yard field goal, 2:43. Chiefs 10–3. **Drive: 5 plays, 44 yards, 1:20.**
- LAC – Cameron Dicker 40-yard field goal, 0:00. Chiefs 10–6. **Drive: 9 plays, 66 yards, 1:24.**

**Third quarter**

- LAC – Cameron Dicker 43-yard field goal, 4:11. Chiefs 10–9. **Drive: 12 plays, 60 yards, 5:59.**

**Fourth quarter**

- LAC – Cameron Dicker 20-yard field goal, 4:06. Chargers 12–10. **Drive: 18 plays, 84 yards, 6:49.**
- KC – Harrison Butker 41-yard field goal, 0:49. Chiefs 13–12. **Drive: 9 plays, 51 yards, 3:17.**

**Top passers**

- KC – Blaine Gabbert – 15/30, 154 yards, INT
- LAC – Easton Stick – 28/47, 258 yards

**Top rushers**

- KC – La'Mical Perine – 21 rushes, 76 yards
- LAC – Easton Stick – 13 rushes, 77 yards

**Top receivers**

- KC – Mecole Hardman – 6 receptions, 77 yards
- LAC – Donald Parham – 5 receptions, 83 yards

With the win, the Chiefs finish the year with an 11-6 record. They enter the playoffs as the #3-seed and will host the Miami Dolphins in the Wild Card Round.

=== Standings ===
==== Division ====
AFC West
	W	L	T	PCT	DIV	CONF	PF	PA	STK
^{(3)} Kansas City Chiefs	11	6	0	.647	4–2	9–3	371	294	W2
Las Vegas Raiders	8	9	0	.471	4–2	6–6	332	331	W1
Denver Broncos	8	9	0	.471	3–3	5–7	357	413	L1
Los Angeles Chargers	5	12	0	.294	1–5	3–9	346	398	L5

==== Conference ====
AFC
#	Team	Division	W	L	T	PCT	DIV	CONF	SOS	SOV	STK
**Division leaders**
1	Baltimore Ravens	North	13	4	0	.765	3–3	8–4	.543	.529	L1
2 (Note: Buffalo claimed the No. 2 seed over Kansas City based on head-to-head victory.) (Note: Buffalo finished ahead of Miami in the AFC East based on head-to-head sweep.)	Buffalo Bills	East	11	6	0	.647	4–2	7–5	.471	.471	W5
3	Kansas City Chiefs	West	11	6	0	.647	4–2	9–3	.481	.428	W2
4	Houston Texans	South	10	7	0	.588	4–2	7–5	.474	.465	W2
**Wild cards**
5 (Note: Cleveland claimed the No. 5 seed over Miami based on conference record.)	Cleveland Browns	North	11	6	0	.647	3–3	8–4	.536	.513	L1
6	Miami Dolphins	East	11	6	0	.647	4–2	7–5	.450	.358	L2
7	Pittsburgh Steelers	North	10	7	0	.588	5–1	7–5	.540	.571	W3
**Did not qualify for the postseason**
8 (Note: Cincinnati finished ahead of Jacksonville based on head-to-head victory. Division tie break was initially used to eliminate Indianapolis (see below).)	Cincinnati Bengals	North	9	8	0	.529	1–5	4–8	.574	.536	W1
9 (Note: Jacksonville finished ahead of Indianapolis based on head-to-head sweep.)	Jacksonville Jaguars	South	9	8	0	.529	4–2	6–6	.533	.477	L1
10	Indianapolis Colts	South	9	8	0	.529	3–3	7–5	.491	.444	L1
11 (Note: Las Vegas finished ahead of Denver based on head-to-head sweep.)	Las Vegas Raiders	West	8	9	0	.471	4–2	6–6	.488	.426	W1
12	Denver Broncos	West	8	9	0	.471	3–3	5–7	.488	.485	L1
13	New York Jets	East	7	10	0	.412	2–4	4–8	.502	.454	W1
14	Tennessee Titans	South	6	11	0	.353	1–5	4–8	.522	.422	W1
15	Los Angeles Chargers	West	5	12	0	.294	1–5	3–9	.529	.388	L5
16	New England Patriots	East	4	13	0	.235	2–4	4–8	.522	.529	L2
**Tiebreakers** (Note: When breaking ties for three or more teams under the NFL's rules, they are first broken within divisions, then comparing only the highest ranked remaining team from each division.)

== Postseason ==
=== Schedule ===
Round	Date	Opponent (seed)	Result	Record	Venue	Recap
Wild Card	January 13	Miami Dolphins (6)	W 26–7	1–0	Arrowhead Stadium	Recap
Divisional	January 21	at Buffalo Bills (2)	W 27–24	2–0	Highmark Stadium	Recap
AFC Championship	January 28	at Baltimore Ravens (1)	W 17–10	3–0	M&T Bank Stadium	Recap
Super Bowl LVIII	February 11	vs. San Francisco 49ers (N1)	W 25–22 (OT)	4–0	Allegiant Stadium	Recap

=== Game summaries ===
==== AFC Wild Card Playoffs: vs. (6) Miami Dolphins ====
AFC Wild Card Playoffs: (6) Miami Dolphins at (3) Kansas City Chiefs – Game summary

Quarter	1	2	3	4	Total
Dolphins	0	7	0	0	7
Chiefs	7	9	3	7	26

at Arrowhead Stadium, Kansas City, Missouri

- Date: January 13, 2024
- Game time: 7:10 p.m. CST
- Game weather: −4 °F (−20 °C)
- Game attendance: 71,492
- Referee: Brad Rogers
- TV announcers (Peacock): Mike Tirico, Jason Garrett and Kaylee Hartung
- Recap, Game Book

Game information

First quarter

- KC – Rashee Rice 11-yard pass from Patrick Mahomes (Harrison Butker kick), 11:05. Chiefs 7–0. Drive: 9 plays, 69 yards, 3:55.

Second quarter

- KC – Harrison Butker 28-yard field goal, 14:52. Chiefs 10–0. Drive: 10 plays, 48 yards, 3:12.
- MIA – Tyreek Hill 53-yard pass from Tua Tagovailoa (Jason Sanders kick), 14:01. Chiefs 10–7. Drive: 2 plays, 62 yards, 0:50.
- KC – Harrison Butker 26-yard field goal, 7:36. Chiefs 13–7. Drive: 12 plays, 72 yards, 6:25.
- KC – Harrison Butker 32-yard field goal, 0:18. Chiefs 16–7. Drive: 7 plays, 47 yards, 1:25.

Third quarter

- KC – Harrison Butker 21-yard field goal, 7:49. Chiefs 19–7. Drive: 13 plays, 69 yards, 5:32.

Fourth quarter

- KC – Isiah Pacheco 3-yard run (Harrison Butker kick), 11:06. Chiefs 26–7. Drive: 14 plays, 72 yards, 7:01.

Top passers

- MIA – Tua Tagovailoa – 20/39, 199 yards, TD, INT
- KC – Patrick Mahomes – 23/41, 262 yards, TD

Top rushers

- MIA – Raheem Mostert – 8 rushes, 33 yards
- KC – Isiah Pacheco – 24 rushes, 89 yards, TD

Top receivers

- MIA – Tyreek Hill – 5 receptions, 62 yards, TD
- KC – Rashee Rice – 8 receptions, 130 yards, TD

This game drew an average of 23 million viewers, making it the most live-streamed event in the United States. As the first-ever exclusive streaming NFL playoff game, it accounted for 30% of total internet traffic during the broadcast.

==== AFC Divisional Playoffs: at (2) Buffalo Bills ====
AFC Divisional Playoffs: (3) Kansas City Chiefs at (2) Buffalo Bills– Game summary

Quarter	1	2	3	4	Total
Chiefs	3	10	7	7	27
Bills	3	14	7	0	24

at Highmark Stadium, Orchard Park, New York

- Date: January 21, 2024
- Game time: 6:30 p.m. EST/5:30 p.m. CST
- Game weather: Cloudy, 25 °F (−4 °C)
- Game attendance: 70,808
- Referee: Shawn Hochuli
- TV announcers (CBS): Jim Nantz, Tony Romo, Tracy Wolfson and Jay Feely
- Recap, Game Book

Game information

First quarter

- BUF – Tyler Bass 27-yard field goal, 8:08. Bills 3–0. Drive: 14 plays, 60 yards, 6:52.
- KC – Harrison Butker 47-yard field goal, 4:35. Tied 3–3. Drive: 7 plays, 46 yards, 3:33.

Second quarter

- BUF – Josh Allen 5-yard run (Tyler Bass kick), 13:32. Bills 10–3. Drive: 11 plays, 75 yards, 6:03.
- KC – Harrison Butker 29-yard field goal, 9:12. Bills 10–6. Drive: 10 plays, 64 yards, 4:20.
- KC – Travis Kelce 22-yard pass from Patrick Mahomes (Harrison Butker kick), 3:33. Chiefs 13–10. Drive: 5 plays, 65 yards, 2:34.
- BUF – Josh Allen 2-yard run (Tyler Bass kick), 0:26. Bills 17–13. Drive: 12 plays, 75 yards, 3:07.

Third quarter

- KC – Travis Kelce 3-yard pass from Patrick Mahomes (Harrison Butker kick), 11:48. Chiefs 20–17. Drive: 6 plays, 75 yards, 3:12.
- BUF – Khalil Shakir 13-yard pass from Josh Allen (Tyler Bass kick), 3:22. Bills 24–20. Drive: 15 plays, 75 yards, 8:25.

Fourth quarter

- KC – Isiah Pacheco 4-yard run (Harrison Butker kick), 14:20. Chiefs 27–24. Drive: 8 plays, 75 yards, 4:03.

Top passers

- KC – Patrick Mahomes – 17/23, 215 yards, 2 TD
- BUF – Josh Allen – 26/39, 186 yards, TD

Top rushers

- KC – Isiah Pacheco – 15 rushes, 97 yards, TD
- BUF – Josh Allen – 12 rushes, 72 yards, 2 TD

Top receivers

- KC – Travis Kelce – 5 receptions, 75 yards, 2 TD
- BUF – Dalton Kincaid – 5 receptions, 45 yards

==== AFC Championship: at (1) Baltimore Ravens ====
AFC Championship: (3) Kansas City Chiefs at (1) Baltimore Ravens – Game summary

Quarter	1	2	3	4	Total
Chiefs	7	10	0	0	17
Ravens	7	0	0	3	10

at M&T Bank Stadium, Baltimore, Maryland

- Date: January 28, 2024
- Game time: 3:05 p.m. EST/2:05 p.m. CST
- Game weather: Cloudy, 47 °F (8 °C)
- Game attendance: 71,439
- Referee: Shawn Smith
- TV announcers (CBS): Jim Nantz, Tony Romo, Tracy Wolfson, Evan Washburn and Jay Feely
- Recap, Game Book

Game information

First quarter

- KC – Travis Kelce 19-yard pass from Patrick Mahomes (Harrison Butker kick), 7:41. Chiefs 7–0. Drive: 10 plays, 86 yards, 5:45.
- BAL – Zay Flowers 30-yard pass from Lamar Jackson (Justin Tucker kick), 4:58. Tied 7–7. Drive: 6 plays, 75 yards, 2:43.

Second quarter

- KC – Isiah Pacheco 2-yard run (Harrison Butker kick), 10:56. Chiefs 14–7. Drive: 16 plays, 75 yards, 9:02.
- KC – Harrison Butker 52-yard field goal, 0:04. Chiefs 17–7. Drive: 8 plays, 55 yards, 1:42.

Third quarter

- No scoring plays.

Fourth quarter

- BAL – Justin Tucker 43-yard field goal, 2:34. Chiefs 17–10. Drive: 9 plays, 29 yards, 2:26.

Top passers

- KC – Patrick Mahomes – 30/39, 241 yards, TD
- BAL – Lamar Jackson – 20/37, 272 yards, TD, INT

Top rushers

- KC – Isiah Pacheco 24 rushes, 68 yards, TD
- BAL – Lamar Jackson – 8 rushes, 54 yards

Top receivers

- KC – Travis Kelce – 11 receptions, 116 yards, TD
- BAL – Zay Flowers – 5 receptions, 115 yards, TD

==== Super Bowl LVIII: vs. (N1) San Francisco 49ers ====
Super Bowl LVIII: (N1) San Francisco 49ers vs. (A3) Kansas City Chiefs – Game summary

Quarter	1	2	3	4	OT	Total
49ers	0	10	0	9	3	22
Chiefs	0	3	10	6	6	25

at Allegiant Stadium, Paradise, Nevada

- Date: February 11, 2024
- Game time: 5:30 p.m. CST/3:30 p.m. PST
- Game weather: None (indoor stadium)
- Game attendance: 61,629
- Referee: Bill Vinovich
- TV announcers (CBS/Nick): Jim Nantz, Tony Romo, Tracy Wolfson, Evan Washburn and Jay Feely
- Recap, Game Book

Game information

First quarter

- No scoring plays.

Second quarter

- SF – Jake Moody 55-yard field goal, 14:48. 49ers 3–0. Drive: 10 plays, 46 yards, 4:05.
- SF – Christian McCaffrey 21-yard pass from Jauan Jennings (Jake Moody kick), 4:23. 49ers 10–0. Drive: 8 plays, 67 yards, 3:26.
- KC – Harrison Butker 28-yard field goal, 0:20. 49ers 10–3. Drive: 13 plays, 65 yards, 4:03.

Third quarter

- KC – Harrison Butker 57-yard field goal, 5:01. 49ers 10–6. Drive: 9 plays, 47 yards, 4:01.
- KC – Marquez Valdes-Scantling 16-yard pass from Patrick Mahomes (Harrison Butker kick), 2:28. Chiefs 13–10. Drive: 1 play, 16 yards, 0:04.

Fourth quarter

- SF – Jauan Jennings 10-yard pass from Brock Purdy (kick blocked), 11:22. 49ers 16–13. Drive: 12 plays, 75 yards, 6:06.
- KC – Harrison Butker 24-yard field goal, 5:46. Tied 16–16. Drive: 12 plays, 69 yards, 5:36.
- SF – Jake Moody 53-yard field goal, 1:53. 49ers 19–16. Drive: 7 plays, 40 yards, 3:53.
- KC – Harrison Butker 29-yard field goal, 0:03. Tied 19–19. Drive: 11 plays, 64 yards, 1:50.

Overtime

- SF – Jake Moody 27-yard field goal, 7:22. 49ers 22–19. Drive: 13 plays, 66 yards, 7:38.
- KC – Mecole Hardman 3-yard pass from Patrick Mahomes, 0:03. Chiefs 25–22. Drive: 13 plays, 75 yards, 7:19.

Top passers

- SF – Brock Purdy – 23/38, 255 yards, TD
- KC – Patrick Mahomes – 34/46, 333 yards, 2 TD, INT

Top rushers

- SF – Christian McCaffrey – 22 rushes, 80 yards
- KC – Patrick Mahomes – 9 rushes, 66 yards

Top receivers

- SF – Christian McCaffrey – 8 receptions, 80 yards, TD
- KC – Travis Kelce – 9 receptions, 93 yards

== See also ==
- 2024 Kansas City parade shooting
