= Sebastian Gutierrez =

Sebastian Gutierrez may refer to:

- Sebastian Gutierrez (director) (born 1974), a Venezuelan film director, screenwriter and film producer
- Sebastian Gutierrez (American football) (born 1998), an American professional gridiron football player
- Sebastián Gutiérrez (footballer) (born 1997), a Colombian professional association football player
