= Joe Bleymaier =

American football coach (born 1982)

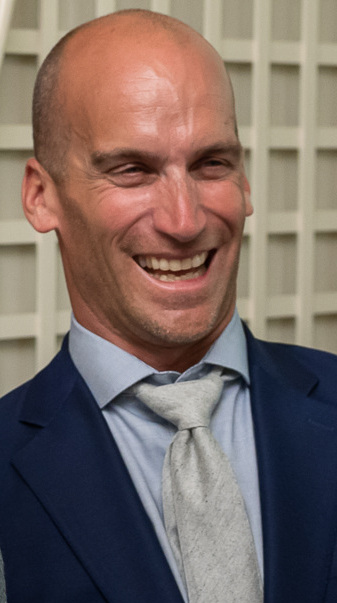
- Bleymaier in 2023

Kansas City Chiefs
- Title: Pass game coordinator

Personal information
- Born: August 9, 1982 (age 44); Boise, Idaho, U.S.

Career information
- Position: Wide receiver
- High school: Bishop Kelly (ID)
- College: Delaware

Career history

Coaching
- Wauwatosa East HS (2006–2007) Assistant coach; Colorado (2013–2015); Assistant director of quality control (2013-2014); Director of quality control (2015); Kansas City Chiefs (2016–present); Offensive quality control (2016-2017); Pass game analyst & assistant quarterbacks coach (2018-2020); Wide receivers coach (2021-2022); Pass game coordinator (2023-present)

Operations
- Pacific (CA) (2009–2011) Assistant director of compliance

Awards and highlights
- 3× Super Bowl champion (LIV, LVII, LVIII)

Joe Bleymaier (born August 9, 1982) is an American football coach who is the pass game coordinator for the Kansas City Chiefs of the National Football League (NFL). He was previously a quality control coach, pass game analyst, assistant quarterbacks coach, and wide receivers coach for the Chiefs. He was previously a quality control coach at the University of Colorado Boulder.

== Coaching career ==
Bleymaier joined the Kansas City Chiefs coaching staff in 2016 as a quality control coach, at the recommendation of former college teammate and Chiefs general manager Brett Veach, as well as former Delaware quarterback and then-Chiefs offensive coordinator Matt Nagy. He was promoted to pass game analyst and assistant quarterbacks coach in 2018, winning his first career Super Bowl the following season when the Chiefs defeated the San Francisco 49ers in Super Bowl LIV 31–20.

As one of the Chiefs coaches whose duties include advance scouting of opposing teams, Bleymaier was one of the assistant coaches for the Chiefs given credit for helping them convert a 4th-and-1 play in the 2020 AFC Divisional Round that helped them advance into the next round of the playoffs. He was also credited by Chiefs head coach Andy Reid for his behind-the-scenes work on the Chiefs' innovative and creative concepts on offense.

Bleymaier was promoted to wide receivers coach on April 2, 2021. In 2022, Bleymaier won his second Super Bowl when the Chiefs defeated the Philadelphia Eagles 38–35 in Super Bowl LVII.

Bleymaier was promoted to pass game coordinator for the Chiefs prior to the 2023 NFL season. In 2023, Bleymaier won his third Super Bowl when the Chiefs defeated the 49ers 25–22 in Super Bowl LVIII.

== Personal life ==
Bleymaier is the son of former Boise State and San Jose State athletic director Gene Bleymaier. After earning his Juris Doctor degree at Marquette University, Joe went to work for the University of the Pacific's athletic department in 2009–10 and 2010–11 as an assistant director of compliance. In the spring of 2011, he moved to Mountain View, Calif., and co-founded an early stage tech start-up with his younger brother, Tom.
