= Rowlett High School =

Location
- 4700 President George Bush Highway; Rowlett, Texas 75088-5191; United States; 32°54′07″N 96°33′17″W

Information
- Other name: RHS
- School type: Public high school
- Opened: 1996 (30 years ago)
- School district: Garland Independent School District
- Superintendent: Ricardo Lopez
- CEEB code: 446017
- Principal: David Dunphy
- Staff: 194
- Teaching staff: 142.80 (FTE)
- Grades: 9-12
- Enrollment: 2,286 (2023-2024)
- Student to teacher ratio: 16.01
- Hours in school day: 8
- Color: Maroon
- Athletics conference: UIL 6A
- Mascot: Bald eagle
- Nickname: Eagles
- Rival: Sachse High School
- Newspaper: Eagle Eye News
- Yearbook: The Talon
- Website: www.garlandisdschools.net/rhs

Rowlett High School is a public secondary school located in Rowlett, Texas, United States. Rowlett High School enrolls students in grades 9-12 and is a part of the Garland Independent School District. The school opened in the fall of 1996 with Marlene Hammerle as principal. It is the second newest high school in the district. In 2005, Rowlett High School was recognized by Newsweek on their "Top 1,000 High Schools in the Nation" list, which is based on Advanced Placement scores. Also, Rowlett has won the "Top PTSA" award and the "Highest Attendance" award for their district numerous times.

In 2009, 2010, 2011, and 2012, the school was rated "recognized" by the Texas Education Agency.

Garland ISD is a "Free Choice" school district, which allows the parents to choose which school their children want to attend within the district.

== Academics ==
The school's course offerings include regular college readiness, career and technology, and dual enrollment courses.

== Statistics (per 2009) ==
The attendance rate for students at the school is 96%, equal to the state average of 96%. 23% of the students at Rowlett are economically disadvantaged, 8% enroll in special education, 7% enroll in gifted and talent programs, 40% are enrolled in career and technology programs, and 3% are considered "limited English proficient".

The ethnic makeup of the school is 54% White, non-Hispanic, 24% Hispanic, 15% African American, 8% Asian/Pacific Islander, and less than 1% Native American.

The average class sizes at Rowlett are 24 students for English, 24 for foreign language, 24 for math, 22 for science, and 26 for social studies.

Teachers at the school carry, on average, 10 years of teaching experience and 4% of the teachers on staff are first-year teachers.

Exit level TAKS scores (% passed)
Reading - 99%,
Math - 97%,
Social studies - 100%,
Science - 98%

== Extracurricular activities ==
The 2011 national champion Rowlett Silver Rhythm Dancers (drill team) were featured in the Super Bowl XLV halftime show with the Black Eyed Peas.

== Athletics ==
The sports Rowlett offers are baseball, basketball, bowling, cross country, football, golf, marching band, soccer, softball, tennis, track, and volleyball. The boys' track and field team placed first at the UIL 5A State Track & Field Championship Meet on May 10, 2008, but won their first track and field district team title in 1999 in the 3rd year of the school's existence. They won a second state title in track and field the next year at the UIL 5A State Track & Field Championship Meet. Rowlett High School is currently a UIL Class 6A school in District 9.

== Notable alumni ==
- Tony Bishop - basketball player
- Jason Castro - contestant on season seven of American Idol
- Kyle Clemons - Olympic sprinter, gold medalist in 4 x 400-meter relay in 2016 Summer Olympics
- Marquise Goodwin - Olympic long jumper and NFL wide receiver for the Seattle Seahawks
- Damontre Moore - former NFL defensive end and current defensive end for Toronto Argonauts
- Joel Murray - basketball player
- Steven Okert - Major League Baseball pitcher for the Houston Astros
- Charles Omenihu - NFL defensive end for the Kansas City Chiefs
- Jane Slater - NFL Network reporter covering the Dallas Cowboys
- Zach Wood - NFL long snapper for the New Orleans Saints
- Logan Bonner - CFL quarterback for the Calgary Stampeders

== See also ==
- Garland, Texas
- List of high schools in Texas
