= Charles Omenihu =

American football player (born 1997)

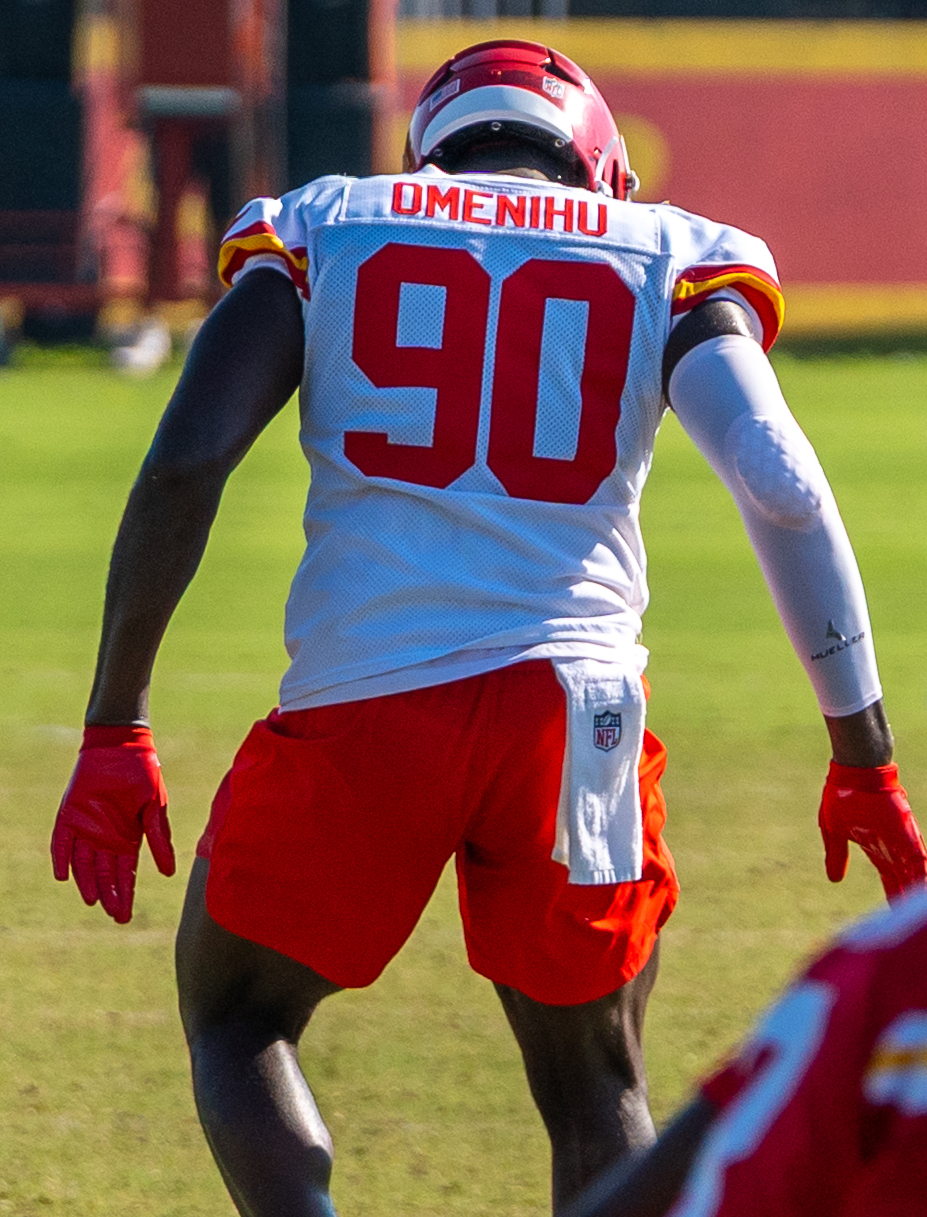
- Omenihu with the Kansas City Chiefs in 2025

No. 90 – Washington Commanders
- Position: Defensive end
- Roster status: Active

Personal information
- Born: August 20, 1997 (age 29); Houston, Texas, U.S.
- Listed height: 6 ft 5 in (1.96 m)
- Listed weight: 280 lb (127 kg)

Career information
- High school: Rowlett (Rowlett, Texas)
- College: Texas (2015–2018)
- NFL draft: 2019: 5th round, 161st overall pick

Career history
- Houston Texans (2019–2021); San Francisco 49ers (2021–2022); Kansas City Chiefs (2023–2025); Washington Commanders (2026–present)

Awards and highlights
- Super Bowl champion (LVIII); Big 12 Defensive Lineman of the Year (2018)

Career NFL statistics as of Week 4, 2026
- Tackles: 130
- Sacks: 23
- Forced fumbles: 6
- Pass deflections: 9
- Stats at Pro Football Reference

Charles Omenihu (born August 20, 1997) is an American professional football defensive end for the Washington Commanders of the National Football League (NFL). Omenihu played college football for the Texas Longhorns and was selected by the Houston Texans in the fifth round of the 2019 NFL draft. He has also played for the San Francisco 49ers and Kansas City Chiefs.

== Early life ==
Omenihu attended Rowlett High School in Rowlett, Texas. He committed to the University of Texas to play college football.

== College career ==
Omenihu played at Texas from 2015 to 2018. During his career, he had 115 tackles and 16.5 sacks, including 9.5 as a senior. He was named Big 12 Defensive Lineman of the Year in 2018.

== Professional career ==
Pre-draft measurables
Height	Weight	Arm length	Hand span	Wingspan	40-yard dash	10-yard split	20-yard split	20-yard shuttle	Three-cone drill	Vertical jump	Broad jump	Bench press
6 ft 5 3/8 in (1.97 m)	280 lb (127 kg)	36 in (0.91 m)	9 3/8 in (0.24 m)	7 ft 1 1/2 in (2.17 m)	4.92 s	1.71 s	2.86 s	4.36 s	7.25 s	36.5 in (0.93 m)	9 ft 7 in (2.92 m)	15 reps
All values from NFL Combine/Pro Day

=== Houston Texans ===
Omenihu was selected by the Houston Texans in the fifth round (161st overall) of the 2019 NFL draft.

=== San Francisco 49ers ===
On November 2, 2021, Omenihu was traded to the San Francisco 49ers for a 2023 sixth-round pick.

=== Kansas City Chiefs ===
Omenihu signed a two-year contract with the Kansas City Chiefs on March 16, 2023. He was suspended the first six games of the 2023 season for violating the NFL’s personal conduct policy.

Omenihu suffered a torn ACL in the 2023 AFC Championship Game against the Baltimore Ravens and was ruled out for Super Bowl LVIII. Without Omenihu, the Chiefs defeated the San Francisco 49ers 25-22 to give Omenihu his first Super Bowl ring.

On July 17, 2024, Omenihu was placed on the Active/physically unable to perform (PUP) list, then placed on reserves to begin the season. He was activated from injured reserve on November 28.

On March 20, 2025, Omenihu re-signed with the Chiefs on a one-year deal worth a maximum of $7 million.

=== Washington Commanders ===
On March 13, 2026, Omenihu signed a one-year, $4 million contract with the Washington Commanders.

== NFL career statistics ==
=== Regular season ===
Year	Team	Games		Tackles					Interceptions						Fumbles	
Year	Team	GP	GS	Cmb	Solo	Ast	Sck	Sfty	PD	Int	Yds	Avg	Lng	TD	FF	FR
2019	HOU	14	0	13	8	6	3.0	0	2	0	0	0.0	0	0	2	0
2020	HOU	15	5	17	11	6	4.5	0	2	0	0	0.0	0	0	0	0
2021	HOU	6	2	11	8	3	0	0	0	0	0	0.0	0	0	0	0
2021	SF	9	0	6	6	0	0.0	0	0	0	0	0.0	0	0	0	0
2022	SF	17	3	20	7	13	0.0	0	1	0	0	0.0	0	0	1	0
2023	KC	11	1	28	18	10	7.0	0	2	0	0	0.0	0	0	2	0
2024	KC	6	1	6	4	2	1.0	0	0	0	0	0.0	0	0	1	0
Career		78	12	101	62	39	19.5	0	8	0	0	0	0	0	6	0

=== Postseason ===
Year	Team	Games		Tackles					Interceptions						Fumbles	
Year	Team	GP	GS	Cmb	Solo	Ast	Sck	Sfty	PD	Int	Yds	Avg	Lng	TD	FF	FR
2019	HOU	2	0	1	0	1	0.0	0	0	0	0	0.0	0	0	0	0
2021	SF	3	0	4	2	2	1.5	0	0	0	0	0.0	0	0	1	0
2022	SF	3	0	5	4	1	2.0	0	0	0	0	0.0	0	0	1	0
2023	KC	3	0	3	1	2	1.0	0	0	0	0	0.0	0	0	1	0
2024	KC	1	0	4	3	1	1.0	0	0	0	0	0.0	0	0	1	0
Career		12	0	17	10	7	5.5	0	0	0	0	0	0	0	4	0

== Personal life ==
Omenihu was arrested for misdemeanor domestic violence on January 24, 2023.

He is of Nigerian descent.
