= Chamarri Conner =

American football player (born 2000)

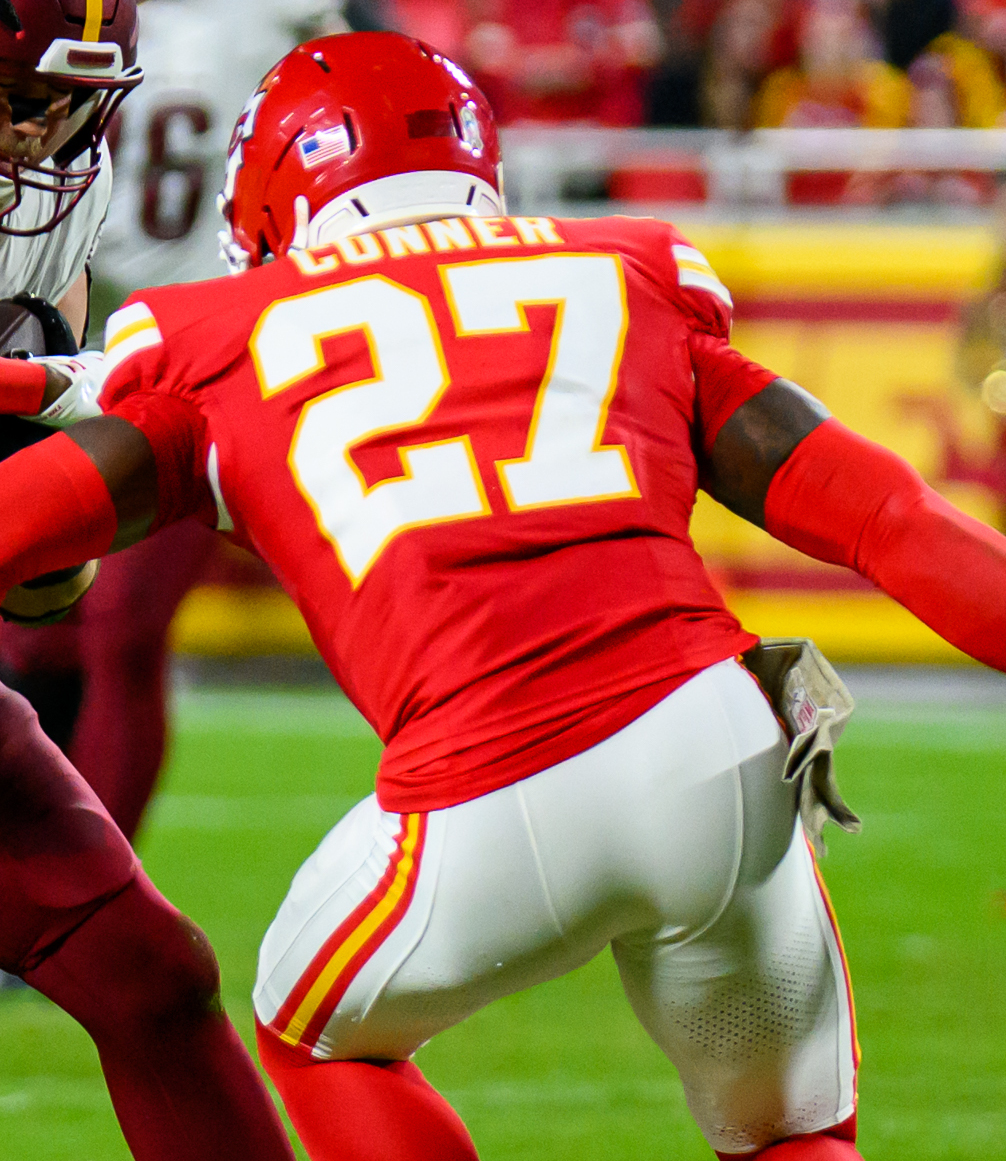
- Conner in 2025

No. 27 – Kansas City Chiefs
- Position: Safety
- Roster status: Active

Personal information
- Born: July 11, 2000 (age 26); Jacksonville, Florida, U.S.
- Listed height: 6 ft 0 in (1.83 m)
- Listed weight: 202 lb (92 kg)

Career information
- High school: Trinity Christian Academy (Jacksonville)
- College: Virginia Tech (2018–2022)
- NFL draft: 2023: 4th round, 119th overall pick

Career history
- Kansas City Chiefs (2023–present)

Awards and highlights
- Super Bowl champion (LVIII)

Career NFL statistics as of Week 8, 2026
- Total tackles: 252
- Sacks: 4
- Fumble recoveries: 1
- Pass deflections: 8
- Interceptions: 4
- Defensive touchdowns: 1
- Stats at Pro Football Reference

Chamarri Elijah Conner (born July 11, 2000) is an American professional football safety for the Kansas City Chiefs of the National Football League (NFL). He played college football for the Virginia Tech Hokies.

== Early life ==
Conner grew up in Jacksonville, Florida, and attended Trinity Christian Academy. He was rated a three-star recruit and committed to play college football at Virginia Tech.

== College career ==
Conner played in all 13 of Virginia Tech's games during his freshman season on special teams and as a backup cornerback. He became a starter as a sophomore and primarily played in the nickelback position until his redshirt senior season, when he was moved to safety. Conner was named honorable mention All-Atlantic Coast Conference (ACC) as a junior after making 81 tackles. He repeated as an honorable mention All-ACC selection as a senior after recording 85 tackles, 5.5 tackles for loss, two sacks, two forced fumbles, an interception, and five passes broken up. Conner used the extra year of eligibility granted to college athletes due to the COVID-19 pandemic and returned to Virginia Tech for a fifth season.

== Professional career ==
=== Pre-draft ===
NFL media analyst Lance Zierlein projected Conner would be selected in the sixth round of the 2023 NFL Draft. NFL draft analyst Cory Giddings of Bleacher Report had Conner ranked as the 25th best safety prospect (285th overall) in the draft and projected him to go undrafted. NFL media analyst Daniel Jeremiah had Conner ranked as the 18th best cornerback prospect (116th overall). NFL draft analyst Michael Renner of Sports Illustrated had him ranked as the 22nd best safety available in the draft.

Pre-draft measurables
Height	Weight	Arm length	Hand span	Wingspan	40-yard dash	10-yard split	20-yard split	20-yard shuttle	Three-cone drill	Vertical jump	Broad jump	Bench press
6 ft 0 in (1.83 m)	202 lb (92 kg)	31 3/8 in (0.80 m)	9 in (0.23 m)	6 ft 4 1/8 in (1.93 m)	4.51 s	1.56 s	2.62 s	4.30 s	6.91 s	40.5 in (1.03 m)	10 ft 5 in (3.18 m)	20 reps
All values from NFL Combine/Pro Day

=== 2023 ===
The Kansas City Chiefs selected Conner in the fourth round (119th overall) of the 2023 NFL draft. The Chiefs orchestrated a trade in order to secure their selection of Conner and agreed to trade their 2023 fourth-round pick (134th overall) and a 2024 fifth-round pick (167th overall) to the Minnesota Vikings in return for the fourth-round pick (119th overall) they used to select Conner. He was the sixth safety selected in 2023.

External videos
- Chiefs select Chamarri Conner No. 119

On May 13, 2023, the Kansas City Chiefs signed Conner to a four–year, $4.59 million rookie contract that includes a signing bonus of $751,368.

Throughout training camp, he competed against Bryan Cook and Mike Edwards to be the starting free safety under defensive coordinator Steve Spagnuolo following the departure of Juan Thornhill. Head coach Andy Reid named him a backup safety to begin the season, behind starting safeties Justin Reid and Bryan Cook.

On September 7, 2023, Conner made his professional regular season debut and earned his first career start as a nickelback in the Kansas City Chiefs' home-opener against the Detroit Lions, but was limited to one solo tackle during their 20–21 loss. On December 10, 2023, Conner made three combined tackles (two solo), one pass deflection, and had his first career interception on a pass attempt by Josh Allen to wide receiver Trent Sherfield during a 17–20 loss to the Buffalo Bills. In Week 18, Conner earned his first career start as a safety after head coach Andy Reid elected to rest the starters in preparation for the playoffs. Conner set a season-high with eight solo tackles during a 13–12 victory at the Los Angeles Chargers. He finished his rookie season with 36 combined tackles (31 solo), one pass deflection, and one interception in 17 games and seven starts. He received an overall grade of 81.0 from Pro Football Focus as a rookie in 2023.

The Kansas City Chiefs went on to finish the 2023 NFL season a top the AFC West with a 11–6 record. On January 13, 2024, Conner appeared in the first playoff game of his career and had two combined tackles (one solo) during a 26–7 victory against the Miami Dolphins in the AFC Wild-Card Game. On January 21, 2024, Conner earned his first career start in the playoffs as a nickelback and had ten combined tackles (eight solo) as the Chiefs defeated the Buffalo Bills 27–24 in the Divisional Round. In the AFC Championship Game, he recorded two solo tackles as the Chiefs defeated the Baltimore Ravens and won the AFC Championship Game 17–10 to advance to the Super Bowl. On February 11, 2024, Conner appeared in Super Bowl LVIII and had two solo tackles as the Chiefs defeated the San Francisco 49ers in overtime 25–22.

=== 2024 ===
He entered training camp slated to remain a backup safety. Head coach Andy Reid named him a backup to begin the season, behind starting duo Justin Reid and Bryan Cook. Defensive coordinator Steve Spagnuolo selected Conner to be the starting nickelback to start the season.

On September 15, 2024, Conner had six combined tackles (four solo), made his first career sack on Joe Burrow for a nine–yard loss, and returned a fumble recovery that defensive end Tershawn Wharton caused by Joe Burrow for 38-yards to score his first career touchdown in the fourth quarter to help lead the Chiefs to a 26–25 comeback victory against the Cincinnati Bengals. In Week 3, he set a season-high with ten combined tackles (five solo), made two pass deflections, and intercepted a pass by Kirk Cousins to tight end Kyle Pitts as the Chiefs won 22–17 at the Atlanta Falcons. On November 17, 2024, Conner made eight combined tackles (seven solo), one pass deflection, and set a career-high with his second interception of the season on a pass by Josh Allen to tight end Dawson Knox during a 21–30 loss at the Buffalo Bills. In Week 15, Conner had four combined tackles (three solo) before he exited in the second quarter of a 21–7 victory at the Cleveland Browns after he possibly sustained a concussion after he took a blow to the head by the knee of running back Nick Chubb as he was tackling him during an eight–yard rush. It was confirmed that Conner had indeed sustained a concussion and he remained inactive in concussion protocol for the next two games (Weeks 16–17). He finished the season with a total of 77 combined tackles (58 solo), four pass deflections, two interceptions, one sack, a forced fumble, one fumble recovery, and a touchdown in 15 games and nine starts. He received an overall grade of 68.2 from Pro Football Focus, which ranked 62nd among 222 qualifying safeties in 2024.

The Kansas City Chiefs finished the 2024 NFL season with a 15–2 record and placed first in the AFC West to clinch a first-round bye. On January 18, 2025, Conner had five combined tackles (three solo) and one sack as the Chiefs won 23–14 in the Divisional Round against the Houston Texans. The following game, he started in the AFC Championship Game at nickelback against the Buffalo Bills and recorded nine combined tackles (five solo) during a 32–29 victory. On February 9, 2025, Conner started in a Super Bowl for the first time in his career as a nickelback and made six combined tackles (three solo), as the Chiefs lost Super Bowl LIX 40–22 against the Philadelphia Eagles.

== NFL career statistics ==
Legend
	Won the Super Bowl
	Led the league
**Bold**	Career high

=== Regular season ===
Year	Team	Games		Tackles					Interceptions						Fumbles				
Year	Team	GP	GS	Cmb	Solo	Ast	Sck	TFL	Int	Yds	Avg	Lng	TD	PD	FF	Fum	FR	Yds	TD
2023	KC	17	7	36	31	5	0.0	2	1	4	4.0	4	0	1	0	0	0	0	0
2024	KC	15	9	77	58	19	1.0	**4**	**2**	**32**	**16.0**	**29**	0	**4**	1	0	**1**	**38**	**1**
2025	KC	17	17	**117**	**75**	**42**	**2.0**	**4**	1	1	1.0	1	0	2	**2**	0	0	0	0
Career		49	33	230	164	66	3.0	10	4	37	9.3	29	0	7	3	0	1	38	1

=== Postseason ===
Year	Team	Games		Tackles					Interceptions						Fumbles				
Year	Team	GP	GS	Cmb	Solo	Ast	Sck	TFL	Int	Yds	Avg	Lng	TD	PD	FF	Fum	FR	Yds	TD
2023	KC	4	1	16	**11**	5	0.0	0	0	0	0.0	0	0	0	**1**	0	0	0	0
2024	KC	3	2	**20**	**11**	**9**	**1.0**	**3**	0	0	0.0	0	0	0	**1**	0	0	0	0
Career		7	3	36	22	14	1.0	3	0	0	0.0	0	0	0	2	0	0	0	0
