= Zach Wood =

American football player (born 1993)

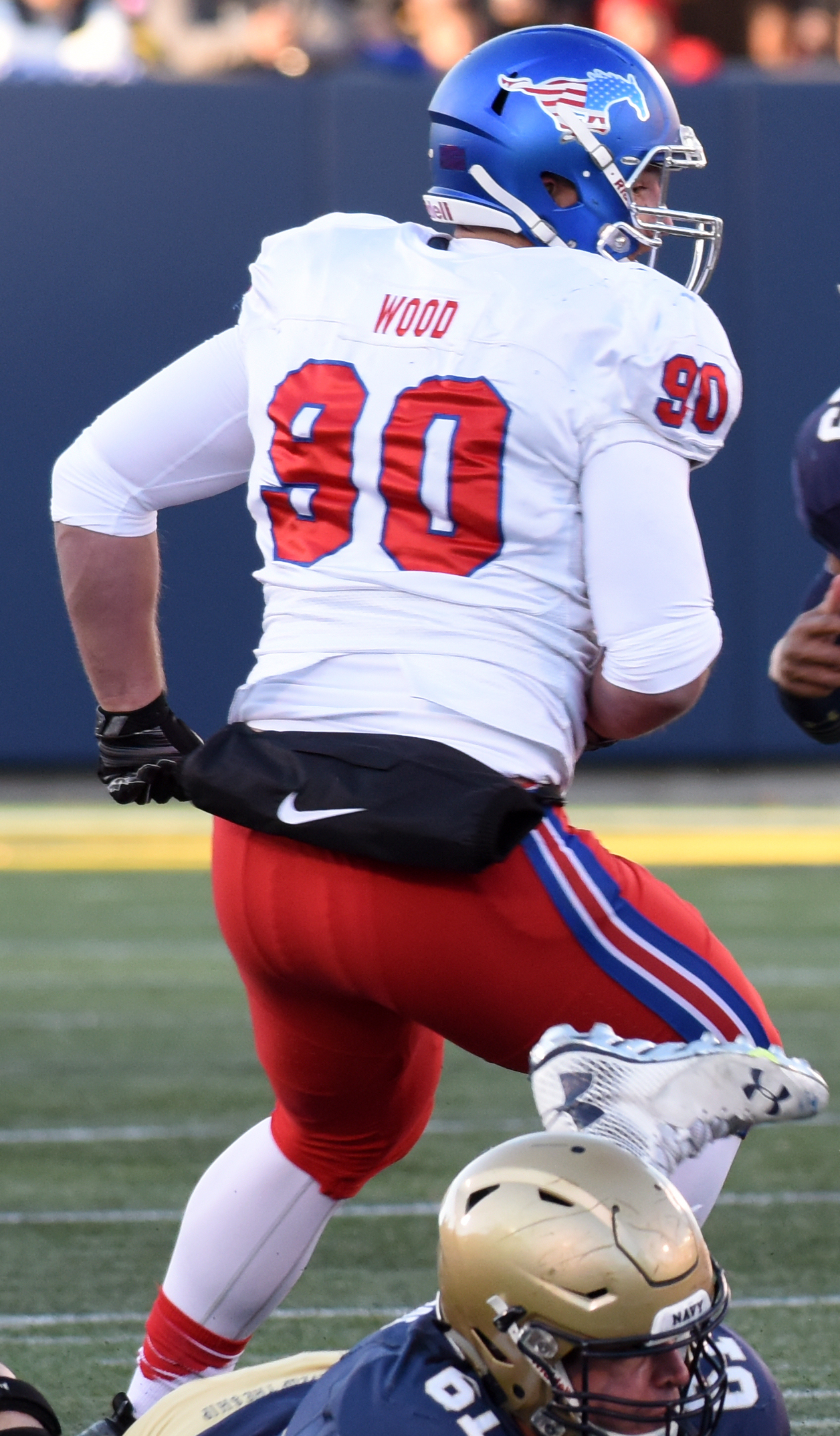
- Wood with the SMU Mustangs in 2015

No. 49 – New Orleans Saints
- Position: Long snapper
- Roster status: Active

Personal information
- Born: January 10, 1993 (age 33); Dallas, Texas, U.S.
- Listed height: 6 ft 3 in (1.91 m)
- Listed weight: 255 lb (116 kg)

Career information
- High school: Rowlett (Rowlett, Texas)
- College: SMU (2011–2015)
- NFL draft: 2016: undrafted

Career history
- Dallas Cowboys (2016–2017)*; New Orleans Saints (2017–present)
- * Offseason or practice squad member only

Career NFL statistics as of Week 8, 2026
- Games played: 152
- Total tackles: 12
- Stats at Pro Football Reference

Zach Wood (born January 10, 1993) is an American professional football long snapper for the New Orleans Saints of the National Football League (NFL). He played college football for the SMU Mustangs. He has also been a member of the Dallas Cowboys.

== Early life ==
Wood attended Rowlett High School in Rowlett, Texas, where he played defensive tackle. As a junior, he recorded 99 tackles, 32 tackles for loss and 8 sacks. He posted 115 tackles and 10 sacks his senior season, earning honorable-mention Class 4A All-State as a defensive lineman.

== College career ==
Wood accepted a football scholarship from Southern Methodist University. He was redshirted in 2011. He played in nine games in 2012, tallying five solo tackles, four tackle assists and half a sack.

He played in 12 games, all starts as a 3–4 defensive end, in 2013, making 25 solo tackles, 24 tackle assists, one sack, one pass breakup, two forced fumbles, one fumble recovery and one blocked kick.

Wood appeared in 12 games, all starts as a 3–4 defensive end, in 2014, registering 18 solo tackles, 22 tackle assists, 4 sacks and 1 fumble recovery.

He played in 10 games with 9 starts in 2015 and was a team captain. He recorded 29 solo tackles, 10 tackle assists, 3.5 sacks, 2 pass breakups and 3 blocked kicks. Wood also spent time at long snapper in college. He finished his college career with 33-of-43 starts, 137 tackles, 22 tackles for loss, 9 sacks, 2 forced fumbles and 3 blocked kicks.

== Professional career ==
=== Pre-draft ===
Wood was rated the 85th best defensive end in the 2016 NFL draft by NFLDraftScout.com.

Pre-draft measurables
Height	Weight	Arm length	Hand span	Wingspan	40-yard dash	10-yard split	20-yard split	20-yard shuttle	Three-cone drill	Vertical jump	Broad jump	Bench press
6 ft 2 7/8 in (1.90 m)	282 lb (128 kg)	30 3/4 in (0.78 m)	8 7/8 in (0.23 m)	6 ft 3 1/4 in (1.91 m)	5.15 s	1.82 s	2.97 s	4.67 s	7.43 s	28.0 in (0.71 m)	8 ft 3 in (2.51 m)	25 reps
All values from SMU Pro Day

=== Dallas Cowboys ===
Wood was signed as an undrafted free agent by the Dallas Cowboys after the 2016 NFL draft, following a rookie minicamp tryout on May 24. During his first training camp with the team, he also played on the defensive line, even taking the snaps with the first defense in practices. Wood was waived by the Cowboys on September 1, 2016.

Wood signed a reserve/future contract with the Cowboys on January 16, 2017. In his second training camp with the Cowboys, he concentrated on being a long snapper and taking some of the practice load from stalwart L. P. Ladouceur. He was released by Dallas as a part of final roster cuts on September 2.

Wood in 2023

=== New Orleans Saints ===
In 2017, the New Orleans Saints couldn't find a potential candidate for the long snapper job during training camp. On August 28, 2017, the Saints obtained Jon Dorenbos from the Philadelphia Eagles in exchange for a seventh-round draft pick (not exercised). On September 7, it was revealed that Dorenbos was diagnosed with an aortic aneurysm, which required immediate heart surgery. He was placed on the non-football illness list the same day, and released with an injury settlement on September 9, before announcing his retirement. On September 9, Wood was signed by the Saints, after a last minute tryout that included four other players. He successfully became the team's long snapper for all punts and placekicks during the season.

On February 20, 2018, he was re-signed to a one-year contract. On February 11, 2019, he was re-signed to a one-year contract. On March 23, 2020, Wood signed a four-year contract with the Saints. He was placed on the reserve/COVID-19 list by the team on August 6, and activated from the list three days later.

On July 28, 2023, Wood signed a four-year contract extension with the Saints. In the regular season, he appeared in all 17 games for New Orleans.

On September 16, 2026, Wood was ruled out for four–to–six weeks after being diagnosed with a Grade 2 calf strain.
