= Ekow Boye-Doe =

American football player (born 1999)

Profile
- Position: Cornerback

Personal information
- Born: November 4, 1999 (age 27); Accra, Ghana
- Listed height: 6 ft 0 in (1.83 m)
- Listed weight: 177 lb (80 kg)

Career information
- High school: Lawrence (Lawrence, Kansas, U.S.)
- College: Kansas State (2018–2022)
- NFL draft: 2023: undrafted

Career history
- Kansas City Chiefs (2023); New York Giants (2024)*; Arizona Cardinals (2025)*; DC Defenders (2026); Detroit Lions (2026)*
- * Offseason or practice squad member only

Awards and highlights
- Super Bowl champion (LVIII)

Career NFL statistics as of 2024
- Games played: 6
- Stats at Pro Football Reference

Ekow Boye-Doe (born November 4, 1999) is a Ghanaian-American professional football cornerback. He played college football for the Kansas State Wildcats. Boye-Doe was signed by the Kansas City Chiefs as an undrafted free agent following the 2023 NFL Draft.

== Early life ==
Boye-Doe was born in Accra, Ghana and immigrated to the United States with his family when he was three years old, where he would attend Lawrence High School in Lawrence, Kansas. In his senior season he was named a first-team all-state performer. Boye-Doe committed to play college football at Kansas State over other schools such as Missouri State, Northern Iowa and Tulane.

== College career ==
In his first season in 2019, Boye-Doe had one tackle in one game. In the 2020 season, he took a step up notching 25 tackles with one being for a loss, and seven pass deflections. In the 2021 season Boye-Doe had 22 tackles with two going for a loss, and a pass deflection. In week ten of the 2022 season, he made three tackles and forced a fumble, but the Wildcats would fall against Texas. Boye-Doe finished the 2022 season his best, as he notched 26 tackles, five pass deflections, a fumble recovery, and a forced fumble. For his performance on the season Boye-Doe was named an honorable mention all-Big 12 member.

Boye-Doe finished his college career at Kansas State with 74 tackles with three being for a loss, 13 pass deflections, a forced fumble, and a fumble recovery.

== Professional career ==
Pre-draft measurables
Height	Weight	Arm length	Hand span	Wingspan	40-yard dash	10-yard split	20-yard split	20-yard shuttle	Vertical jump	Broad jump
5 ft 11 5/8 in (1.82 m)	177 lb (80 kg)	30 1/2 in (0.77 m)	8 7/8 in (0.23 m)	6 ft 1 1/2 in (1.87 m)	4.39 s	1.59 s	2.60 s	4.22 s	37.0 in (0.94 m)	10 ft 3 in (3.12 m)
All values from Pro Day

=== Kansas City Chiefs ===
After not being selected in the 2023 NFL draft, Boye-Doe signed with the Kansas City Chiefs as an undrafted free agent. Boye-Doe was released during final roster cuts, but he was signed to the practice squad soon after. On November 28, he was promoted to the Chiefs active roster. Boye-Doe became a Super Bowl champion when the Chiefs defeated the San Francisco 49ers in Super Bowl LVIII. He was waived on August 26, 2024.

=== New York Giants ===
On December 10, 2024, the New York Giants signed Boye-Doe to their practice squad.

=== Arizona Cardinals ===
On January 13, 2025, Boye-Doe signed a reserve/future contract with the Arizona Cardinals. He was waived on August 25. Boye-Doe was re-signed to the practice squad on September 17 and released again on September 30.

=== DC Defenders ===
On January 14, 2026, Boye-Doe was selected by the DC Defenders of the United Football League (UFL). He was released by the Defenders on March 19.

=== Detroit Lions ===
On August 16, 2026, Boye-Doe signed with the Detroit Lions. On August 30, Boye-Doe was waived by Detroit as a part of final roster cuts.
