= B. J. Thompson (American football) =

American gridiron football player (born 1999)

Profile
- Position: Defensive end

Personal information
- Born: March 23, 1999 (age 27); England, Arkansas, U.S.
- Listed height: 6 ft 6 in (1.98 m)
- Listed weight: 243 lb (110 kg)

Career information
- High school: England
- College: Baylor (2017–2018); Stephen F. Austin (2019–2022)
- NFL draft: 2023: 5th round, 166th overall pick

Career history
- Kansas City Chiefs (2023–2024); Calgary Stampeders (2025)*; Edmonton Elks (2026}*
- * Offseason or practice squad member only

Awards and highlights
- Super Bowl champion (LVIII); 2× First-team All-WAC (2021, 2022)

Career NFL statistics
- Total tackles: 2
- Stats at Pro Football Reference
- Stats at CFL.ca

Brandon Lamar Thompson Jr. (born March 23, 1999) is an American professional football defensive end. He played college football for the Baylor Bears and Stephen F. Austin Lumberjacks. He was selected by the Kansas City Chiefs in the fifth round of the 2023 NFL draft.

== College career ==
Thompson started his college career at Baylor where he played for two years and tallied 18 tackles, six going for a loss, five sacks, and two pass deflections. He transferred to Stephen F. Austin in 2019.

== Professional career ==
Pre-draft measurables
Height	Weight	Arm length	Hand span	40-yard dash	10-yard split	20-yard split	20-yard shuttle	Three-cone drill	Vertical jump	Broad jump	Bench press
6 ft 5 3/8 in (1.97 m)	238 lb (108 kg)	34 3/8 in (0.87 m)	10 in (0.25 m)	4.61 s	1.57 s	2.64 s	4.46 s	7.06 s	37.5 in (0.95 m)	10 ft 5 in (3.18 m)	13 reps

=== Kansas City Chiefs ===
Thompson was selected by the Kansas City Chiefs in the fifth round (166th overall) of the 2023 NFL draft. Thompson's rookie season ended with him becoming a Super Bowl Champion when the Chiefs defeated the San Francisco 49ers in Super Bowl LVIII.

On June 6, 2024, Thompson suffered a cardiac arrest after having a seizure in a team meeting with the Chiefs. He was transported to a local hospital and was in stable condition. He was placed on the reserve/NFI list to begin the season.

On May 3, 2025, Thompson was released by the Chiefs.

=== Calgary Stampeders ===
On September 22, 2025, Thompson signed with the Calgary Stampeders. He spent the remainder of the season on the practice roster and his contract expired on November 2.

=== Edmonton Elks ===
On May 17, 2026, Thompson signed with the Edmonton Elks. He was released by the Elks on May 31, as part of final roster cuts.
