= Deon Bush =

American football player (born 1993)

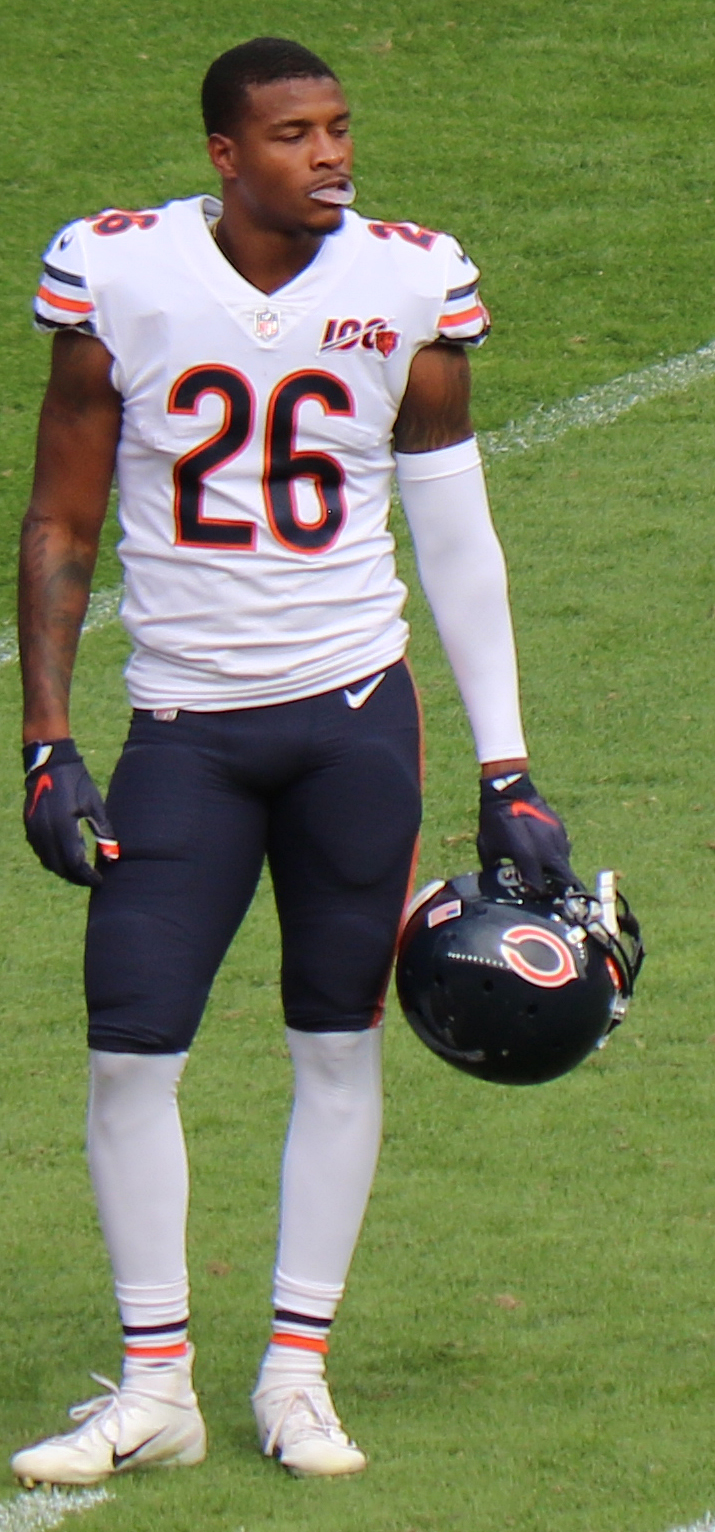
- Bush with the Chicago Bears in 2019

Profile
- Position: Safety

Personal information
- Born: August 14, 1993 (age 33); Miami, Florida, U.S.
- Listed height: 6 ft 0 in (1.83 m)
- Listed weight: 200 lb (91 kg)

Career information
- High school: Christopher Columbus (Miami)
- College: Miami (FL) (2012–2015)
- NFL draft: 2016: 4th round, 124th overall pick

Career history
- Chicago Bears (2016–2021); Kansas City Chiefs (2022–2025)

Awards and highlights
- 2× Super Bowl champion (LVII, LVIII)

Career NFL statistics as of 2025
- Total tackles: 110
- Sacks: 1.0
- Forced fumbles: 1
- Fumble recoveries: 1
- Pass deflections: 11
- Interceptions: 3
- Stats at Pro Football Reference

Deon Bush (born August 14, 1993) is an American professional football safety. He played college football for the Miami Hurricanes and was selected by the Chicago Bears in the fourth round of the 2016 NFL draft.

== Professional career ==
Pre-draft measurables
Height	Weight	Arm length	Hand span	40-yard dash	10-yard split	20-yard split	Three-cone drill	Vertical jump	Broad jump	Bench press
6 ft 0 3/8 in (1.84 m)	199 lb (90 kg)	30 7/8 in (0.78 m)	9 1/4 in (0.23 m)	4.64 s	1.62 s	2.70 s	6.91 s	36 in (0.91 m)	10 ft 3 in (3.12 m)	17 reps
All values are from NFL Combine, except cone drill from Pro Day

=== Chicago Bears ===
Bush was selected in the fourth round (124th overall) by the Chicago Bears in the 2016 NFL draft. He signed a four-year contract worth $2.8 million with a $526,216 signing bonus. Bush made his NFL debut on September 25 against the Dallas Cowboys. In Week 7, he logged his first career tackle against the Green Bay Packers. In Week 11 against the New York Giants, he made his first career start, logging seven tackles. In Week 15, Bush recorded his first pass breakup against the Packers. Bush finished his rookie season with eleven games with six starts, 22 tackles and a pass breakup.

Bush had six tackles in 13 games in 2017.

In Week 12 of the 2018 season against the Detroit Lions, Bush recorded his first NFL sack on Matthew Stafford in the second quarter of the Bears' 23–16 victory. In Week 16, Bush started at free safety against the San Francisco 49ers in place of an injured Eddie Jackson; he recorded two tackles in the 14–9 Chicago victory.

Bush re-signed with the Bears on March 26, 2020. In Week 2 of the 2020 season against the Giants, Bush recorded his first career interception off a pass thrown by Daniel Jones in the 17–13 win. Bush was placed on the reserve/COVID-19 list by the team on November 8, and was activated four days later.

On March 17, 2021, Bush re-signed with the Bears. He suffered a quad injury in Week 6 and was placed on injured reserve on October 19. Bush was activated on November 20.

=== Kansas City Chiefs ===
Bush signed with the Kansas City Chiefs on March 28, 2022. He was part of the Chiefs' team that defeated the Philadelphia Eagles in Super Bowl LVII.

On April 3, 2023, Bush re-signed with the Chiefs. On August 29, he was released by the Chiefs as part of final roster cuts and re-signed to the team's practice squad the following day. He was signed to the active roster on December 16. In the AFC Championship Game against the Baltimore Ravens, Bush recorded an interception on Lamar Jackson in a 17–10 win on the road. In Super Bowl LVIII, Bush mostly played on special teams as the Chiefs defeated the San Francisco 49ers 25–22, giving the team their second consecutive championship.

On March 14, 2024, Bush re-signed with the Chiefs on a one-year contract. On August 27, he was released by Kansas City as part of final roster cuts, and re-signed to the team's practice squad the following day.

Bush signed a reserve/future contract with the Chiefs on February 11, 2025. On August 11, Bush was placed on season-ending injured reserve after having torn his achilles tendon in the Chiefs' preseason opener.
