= Kahlef Hailassie =

American football player (born 2000)

Profile
- Position: Safety

Personal information
- Born: November 9, 2000 (age 25); Elk Grove, California, U.S.
- Listed height: 6 ft 1 in (1.85 m)
- Listed weight: 193 lb (88 kg)

Career information
- High school: Cosumnes Oaks (Elk Grove)
- College: Oregon (2018–2019); Western Kentucky (2021–2022)
- NFL draft: 2023: undrafted

Career history
- Kansas City Chiefs (2023)*; Cleveland Browns (2023–2024); Minnesota Vikings (2025)*; Jacksonville Jaguars (2025); Minnesota Vikings (2025–2026)*; Green Bay Packers (2026)*
- * Offseason or practice squad member only

Career NFL statistics as of Week 8, 2026
- Total tackles: 8
- Pass deflections: 1
- Stats at Pro Football Reference

Kahlef Hailassie (born November 9, 2000) is an American professional football safety. He played college football for the Oregon Ducks and Western Kentucky Hilltoppers. He signed with the Kansas City Chiefs as an undrafted free agent in 2023.

== College career ==
Hailassie played college football for the Oregon Ducks from 2018 to 2019 and for the Western Kentucky Hilltoppers from 2021 to 2022. He was named second-team all-conference for the Hilltoppers as a senior in 2022.

== Professional career ==
Pre-draft measurables
Height	Weight	Arm length	Hand span	Wingspan	20-yard shuttle	Three-cone drill	Vertical jump	Broad jump	Bench press
6 ft 0 1/2 in (1.84 m)	193 lb (88 kg)	32 1/4 in (0.82 m)	10 1/8 in (0.26 m)	6 ft 5 3/4 in (1.97 m)	4.19 s	6.68 s	32.5 in (0.83 m)	10 ft 1 in (3.07 m)	9 reps
All values from Pro Day

=== Kansas City Chiefs ===
On May 6, 2023, the Kansas City Chiefs signed Hailassie to a three-year, $2.705 million contract as an undrafted free agent. He was waived at the final roster cuts on August 29.

=== Cleveland Browns ===
On August 30, 2023, Hailassie was claimed off waivers by the Cleveland Browns. He was waived on October 26, 2024, and re-signed to the practice squad.

=== Minnesota Vikings ===
On January 16, 2025, Hailassie signed a reserve/future contract with the Minnesota Vikings. He was waived on August 26 as part of final roster cuts. Hailassie was re-signed to the practice squad the next day.

=== Jacksonville Jaguars ===
On September 17, 2025, the Jacksonville Jaguars signed Hailassie from the Vikings' practice squad to their own active roster following the release of Darnell Savage. He was waived on November 17.

=== Minnesota Vikings (second stint) ===
On November 26, 2025, Hailassie was signed to the Minnesota Vikings practice squad. He signed a reserve/future contract with Minnesota on January 5, 2026.

On August 30, 2026, Hailassie was waived by the Vikings as a part of the final roster cuts; he was re-signed to the team's practice squad the following day. On September 8, he was released from the practice squad.

=== Green Bay Packers ===
On September 9, 2026, Hailassie was signed to the Green Bay Packers' practice squad. On November 3, he was released.
