= Sebastian Gutierrez (American football) =

American football player (born 1998)

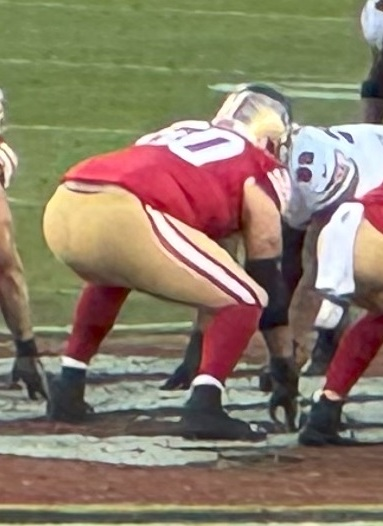
- Gutierrez with the San Francisco 49ers in 2024

Profile
- Position: Offensive tackle

Personal information
- Born: July 6, 1998 (age 28); Pasco, Washington, U.S.
- Listed height: 6 ft 5 in (1.96 m)
- Listed weight: 315 lb (143 kg)

Career information
- High school: Pasco (WA)
- College: Minot State (2016–2021)
- NFL draft: 2022: undrafted

Career history
- Denver Broncos (2022)*; New England Patriots (2022)*; Las Vegas Raiders (2022); Kansas City Chiefs (2023)*; Las Vegas Raiders (2023)*; San Francisco 49ers (2023–2024)*; Cleveland Browns (2024)*; Indianapolis Colts (2024)*; San Francisco 49ers (2024); Cleveland Browns (2025)*; New England Patriots (2025)*; Dallas Cowboys (2026)*
- * Offseason or practice squad member only

Career NFL statistics as of 2025
- Games played: 2
- Stats at Pro Football Reference

Sebastian Gutierrez (born July 6, 1998) is an American professional football offensive tackle. He played college football for the Minot State Beavers.

== Professional career ==
Pre-draft measurables
Height	Weight	Arm length	Hand span	Wingspan	40-yard dash	10-yard split	20-yard split	20-yard shuttle	Three-cone drill	Vertical jump	Broad jump	Bench press
6 ft 4 7/8 in (1.95 m)	308 lb (140 kg)	32 7/8 in (0.84 m)	10 1/2 in (0.27 m)	6 ft 7 5/8 in (2.02 m)	5.10 s	1.79 s	2.90 s	4.68 s	7.58 s	32.5 in (0.83 m)	9 ft 4 in (2.84 m)	28 reps
All values from Pro Day

=== Denver Broncos ===
After not being selected in the 2022 NFL draft Gutierrez signed with the Denver Broncos as an undrafted free agent. On August 29, Gutierrez was waived by the Broncos.

=== New England Patriots ===
On October 5, 2022, Gutierrez signed to the practice squad of the New England Patriots. On October 11, the Patriots released Gutierrez from the practice squad.

=== Las Vegas Raiders (first stint) ===
On October 25, 2022, Gutierrez signed to the Las Vegas Raiders' practice squad. On December 19, Gutierrez was elevated to the active roster. Five days later, Gutierrez made his NFL debut against the Pittsburgh Steelers, playing two snaps.

Gutierrez signed a reserve/future contract with Las Vegas on January 9, 2023. He was waived by the Raiders on May 1.

=== Kansas City Chiefs ===
On May 9, 2023, Gutierrez signed with the Kansas City Chiefs. He was waived by Kansas City on August 29.

=== Las Vegas Raiders (second stint) ===
On September 13, 2023, Gutierrez was signed to the Las Vegas Raiders' practice squad. He was released on October 25.

=== San Francisco 49ers ===
On December 27, 2023, Gutierrez was signed to the San Francisco 49ers' practice squad. He signed a reserve/future contract with San Francisco on February 13, 2024. Gutierrez was waived by the 49ers on August 27, and re-signed to the practice squad. On September 2, Gutierrez was released by the 49ers.

=== Cleveland Browns ===
On September 25, 2024, Gutierrez was signed to the Cleveland Browns' practice squad. He was released by the Browns on October 22.

=== Indianapolis Colts ===
On October 28, 2024, Gutierrez signed with the Indianapolis Colts' practice squad. He was released by Indianapolis on November 25.

=== San Francisco 49ers (second stint) ===
On November 29, 2024, Gutierrez was signed to the San Francisco 49ers' practice squad. On December 7, he was promoted to the active roster. On December 21, Gutierrez was waived by the 49ers, and re-signed to the practice squad. He signed a reserve/future contract with San Francisco on January 6, 2025.

On July 31, 2025, Gutierrez was waived by 49ers.

=== Cleveland Browns (second stint) ===
On August 1, 2025, the Cleveland Browns claimed Gutierrez off of waivers. He was waived by Cleveland on August 24.

=== New England Patriots (second stint) ===
On September 30, 2025, Gutierrez signed with the New England Patriots' practice squad. He was released by the Patriots on December 23. On January 8, 2026, Gutierrez was re-signed to the practice squad, but was released again four days later. On February 11, he signed a reserve/futures contract with the Patriots. On July 25, Gutierrez was released by New England.

=== Dallas Cowboys ===
On August 2, 2026, Gutierrez signed with the Dallas Cowboys. On August 30, he was waived by Dallas as a part of final roster cuts.
