= Brett Veach =

American football executive (born 1977)

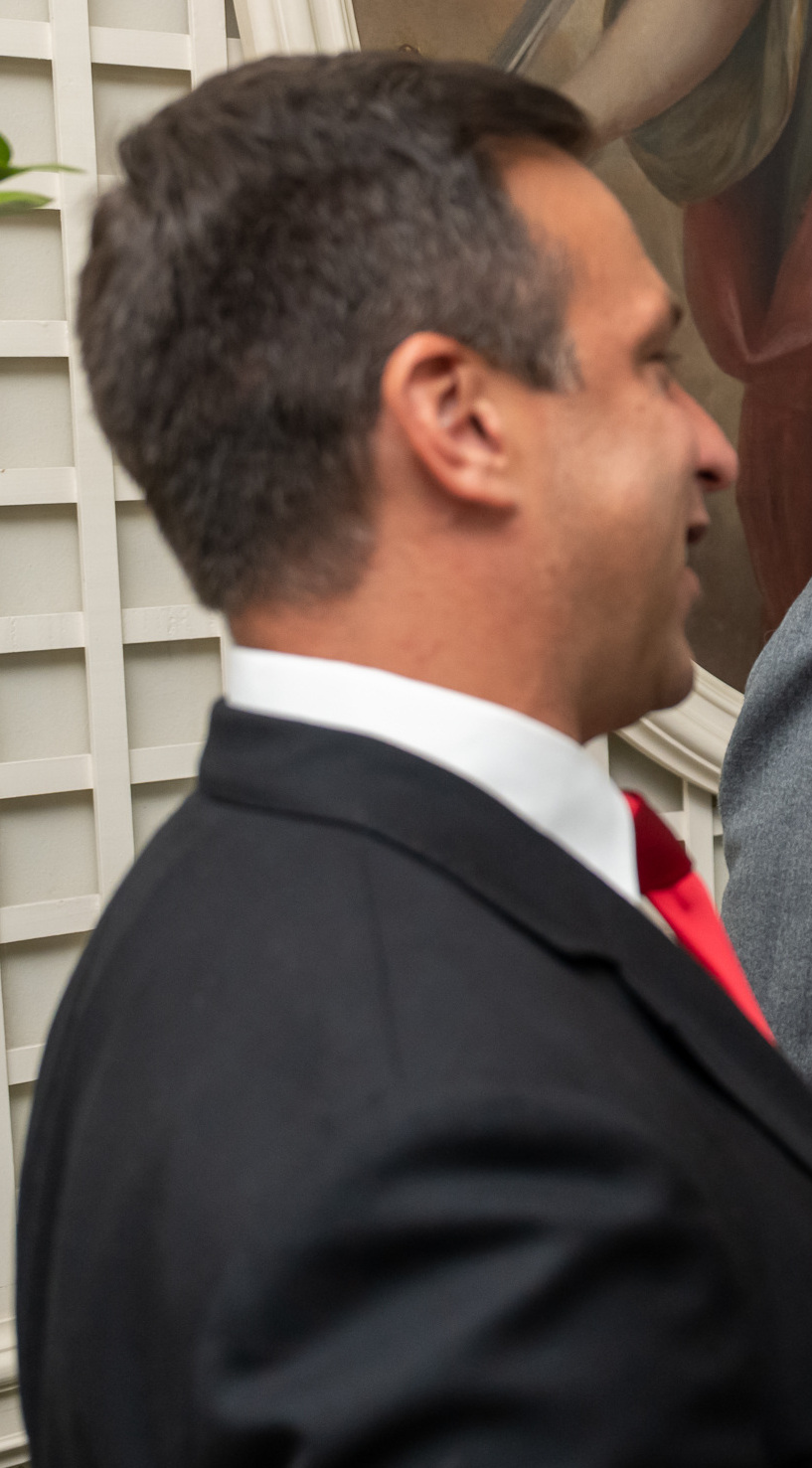
- Veach at the White House in 2023

Kansas City Chiefs
- Title: General manager

Personal information
- Born: December 19, 1977 (age 48); Mount Carmel, Pennsylvania, U.S.

Career information
- Positions: Running back, wide receiver, return specialist
- College: Delaware

Career history
- Philadelphia Eagles (2004–2007) Coaching intern; Philadelphia Eagles (2008–2009) Coaches' assistant; Philadelphia Eagles (2010–2012) Scout; Kansas City Chiefs (2013–2014) Pro and college personnel analyst; Kansas City Chiefs (2015–2016) Co-director of player personnel; Kansas City Chiefs (2017–present) General manager

Awards and highlights
- As an executive: 3× Super Bowl champion (LIV, LVII, LVIII); As a player: Third-team All-Atlantic 10 (2000)
- Executive profile at Pro Football Reference

Brett Veach (born December 19, 1977) is an American professional football executive who is the general manager of the Kansas City Chiefs of the National Football League (NFL). Prior to being the Chiefs general manager from 2017, he was the Chiefs' scout and personnel executive. He began his career as an assistant for the Philadelphia Eagles in 2004, eventually moving up and becoming a scout.

== Early life ==
Veach attended the University of Delaware, where he also played college football. From 1998 to 2001, he played running back, wide receiver, and return specialist for the Fightin' Blue Hens. Veach's teammates included quarterback Matt Nagy, whom Veach would later invite to join the Eagles in 2009; the two would follow Eagles head coach Andy Reid to the Chiefs in 2013.

== Executive career ==
=== Philadelphia Eagles ===
In 2004, Veach began his career as a coaching intern with the Philadelphia Eagles under head coach Andy Reid. In 2008, he was promoted to coaches' assistant.

In 2010, Veach shifted to the Eagles' scouting department and became a scout.

=== Kansas City Chiefs ===
In 2013, Veach followed Andy Reid to the Kansas City Chiefs and was hired as a pro and college personnel analyst. In 2015, Veach was promoted to co-director of player personnel. The Chiefs selected quarterback Patrick Mahomes 10th overall in the 2017 NFL draft. On July 10, 2017, Veach was named general manager of the Kansas City Chiefs following the firing of John Dorsey. Under his leadership, the Chiefs have been awarded nine AFC West championships, five AFC Championships, and three Super Bowls (Super Bowl LIV, Super Bowl LVII, and Super Bowl LVIII).

== Personal life ==
Veach and his wife have three children together.
