= 2025 Kansas City Chiefs season =

American football team season

- Owner: The Hunt Family (Clark Hunt Chairman and CEO)
- General manager: Brett Veach
- Head coach: Andy Reid
- Home stadium: Arrowhead Stadium

Results
- Record: 6–11
- Division place: 3rd AFC West
- Playoffs: Did not qualify
- All-Pros: C Creed Humphrey (1st team)
- Pro Bowlers: 4: C Creed Humphrey; DT Chris Jones; TE Travis Kelce; G Trey Smith
- Team MVP: Patrick Mahomes
- Team ROY: Ashton Gillotte

Uniform

The 2025 season was the Kansas City Chiefs' 56th in the National Football League (NFL), their 66th overall, their ninth under the leadership of general manager Brett Veach and their 13th under head coach Andy Reid. The Chiefs entered the season as the three-time defending AFC champions, hoping to reach their fourth consecutive Super Bowl and rebound from their Super Bowl loss to the Philadelphia Eagles. Although they entered the season as one of the Super Bowl favorites, they stumbled to an 0–2 start before recovering to a 5–3 record. However, they collapsed in the second half of the season, going just 1–8 in their final nine games, including a six-game losing streak to end the season.

Kansas City failed to win the AFC West for the first time since 2015 following a home loss to the Houston Texans in Week 14. The Chiefs were eliminated from playoff contention for the first time since 2014 after a home loss to the division rival Los Angeles Chargers in Week 15. Marred by close losses and struggles in road games, the Chiefs suffered their first losing season since 2012.

The Chiefs struggled with injuries throughout the season, most notably when star quarterback and franchise icon Patrick Mahomes suffered a season-ending ACL tear late in the team's Week 15 game against the Chargers, which eliminated them from playoff contention. Backup quarterback Gardner Minshew then suffered a knee injury the following week, forcing the Chiefs to start third-string quarterback Chris Oladokun in the final two games of the season. After setting an NFL record with 12 one-possession victories the previous season, the Chiefs went just 1–9 in one-possession games. Additionally, they finished 1–7 in road games.

The Chiefs' Thanksgiving game against the Dallas Cowboys had a regular season record of 57.2 million viewers. The game was broadcast on CBS and streaming service Paramount+, and peaked with 61.4 million viewers by the game's conclusion.

Coincidentally; the Chiefs would later be joined by the Florida Panthers of the NHL in how they both reached three consecutive championships from 2023 to 2025 in their leagues to missing the playoffs outright, marking a rare occurrence of an event across North American sports.

== Offseason ==
All transactions below occurred in the 2025 offseason.

=== Futures contracts ===
Futures contracts are signed beginning with the conclusion of the previous season. They typically consist of players who spent a portion of the previous season on the practice squad of a team.

2025 Kansas City Chiefs Futures contracts
Player	Position
Chris Oladokun	QB
Chukwuebuka Godrick	T
Baylor Cupp	TE
Anthony Firkser	TE
Keaontay Ingram	RB
Jason Brownlee	WR
Justyn Ross	WR
Tyquan Thornton	WR
Darius Rush	CB
Deon Bush	S
Eric Scott	DB
Jason Taylor	DB
Shaun Bradley	LB
Siaki Ika	DT
Fabien Lovett	DT

=== Players lost ===
Below are players who were on the roster at the end of the 2024 season, but were either released or did not re-sign after their contract expired.

2025 Kansas City Chiefs Players lost
Player	Position	Reason	New team
Carson Wentz	QB	UFA	Minnesota Vikings
D.J. Humphries	T	UFA	Los Angeles Rams
Samaje Perine	RB	UFA	Cincinnati Bengals
Jody Fortson	TE	UFA	TBD
Peyton Hendershot	TE	UFA	TBD
Mecole Hardman	WR	UFA	Green Bay Packers
DeAndre Hopkins	WR	UFA	Baltimore Ravens
Justin Watson	WR	UFA	Houston Texans
Justin Reid	S	UFA	New Orleans Saints
Keith Taylor	CB	UFA	Atlanta Falcons
Joshua Uche	DE	UFA	Philadelphia Eagles
Derrick Nnadi	DT	UFA	New York Jets
Tershawn Wharton	DT	UFA	Carolina Panthers
Spencer Shrader	K	UFA	Indianapolis Colts

=== Signings ===
2025 Kansas City Chiefs signings
Player	Position	Previous team
Blake Lynch	LB	Kansas City Chiefs Practice squad
Robert Tonyan	TE	Kansas City Chiefs Practice squad
Cole Christiansen	LB	Kansas City Chiefs
Jaylon Moore	T	San Francisco 49ers
Elijah Mitchell	RB	San Francisco 49ers
Kristian Fulton	CB	Los Angeles Chargers
Bailey Zappe	QB	Cleveland Browns
Gardner Minshew	QB	Las Vegas Raiders
Jerry Tillery	DT	Minnesota Vikings
Robert Rochell	CB	Green Bay Packers
Mike Edwards	S	Tampa Bay Buccaneers
Janarius Robinson	DE	Las Vegas Raiders
Tremayne Anchrum	OL	Houston Texans

=== Trades ===
Trades below only are for trades that included a player. Draft pick only trades will go in draft section.

2025 Kansas City Chiefs trades
Team	Received	Compensation
Chicago Bears	4th round selection 2026 NFL draft	Joe Thuney
San Francisco 49ers	6th round selection 2027 NFL draft	Skyy Moore
New York Jets	Derrick Nnadi	6th round selection 2027 NFL draft

=== Draft ===
2025 Kansas City Chiefs draft selections
Round	Selection	Player	Position	College	Notes
1	31	Traded to the Philadelphia Eagles			
1	32	Josh Simmons	OT	Ohio State	From Philadelphia Eagles
2	63	Omarr Norman-Lott	DT	Tennessee	
3	66	Ashton Gillotte	DE	Louisville	From Titans (Note: The Chiefs traded a 2024 seventh-round selection and CB L'Jarius Sneed to the Tennessee Titans in exchange for a third-round selection and a 2024 seventh-round selection.)
3	85	Nohl Williams	CB	California	From Denver via Carolina and New England
3	95	Traded to the Patriots			
4	133	Jalen Royals	WR	Utah State	
5	156	Jeffrey Bassa	LB	Oregon	From Pittsburgh
5	164	Traded to the Pittsburgh Steelers			From Philadelphia Eagles via Lions and Browns
5	167	Traded to the Tennessee Titans (Note: The Chiefs traded a conditional fifth-round selection to the Tennessee Titans in exchange for WR DeAndre Hopkins. The condition – that Tennessee would receive a fifth-round pick if the Chiefs failed to advance to Super Bowl LIX or Hopkins played in less than 60% of the Chiefs' snaps – was converted at the end of the regular season, with Hopkins having played in less than 50% of the Chiefs' 2024 snaps following the trade.)			
6	207	Traded to the New York Jets (Note: The Chiefs traded a sixth-round selection to the New York Jets in exchange for a seventh-round selection and WR Mecole Hardman.)			
7	225	Traded to the Arizona Cardinals (Note: The Chiefs traded a seventh-round selection to Arizona in exchange for DE Cameron Thomas.)			From Jets
7	226	Traded to the Pittsburgh Steelers			From Panthers (Note: The Chiefs traded a conditional seventh-round selection and WR Ihmir Smith-Marsette to Carolina in exchange for a conditional seventh-round selection.)
7	228	Brashard Smith	RB	SMU	From Patriots
7	247	Traded to the Carolina Panthers			
7	251	Traded to the Patriots			Compensatory selection
7	257	Traded to the Patriots			Compensatory selection

2025 Kansas City Chiefs undrafted free agents
Name	Position	College	Ref.
Elijhah Badger	WR	Florida	
Jake Briningstool	TE	Clemson	
Will Brooks	S	Tennessee	
Dalton Cooper	OL	Oklahoma State	
Jacobe Covington	CB	USC	
Eddie Czaplicki	P	USC	
Mac Dalena	WR	Fresno State	
Brandon George	LB	Pittsburgh	
Coziah Izzard	DT	Penn State	
Kevin Knowles	CB	Florida State	
Justin Lockhart	WR	San Jose State	
Glendon Miller	DB	Maryland	
Esa Pole	OT	Washington State	
Melvin Smith Jr.	CB	Southern Arkansas	
Tre Watson	TE	Texas A&M	
Elijah Young	RB	Western Kentucky	
Jimmy Holiday	WR	Louisiana Tech	
Cooper McDonald	LB	TCU	
Major Williams	DB	Carson–Newman	

Draft trades

== Staff ==
2025 Kansas City Chiefs staff
Front office: Chairman/CEO – Clark Hunt; President – Mark Donovan; General manager – Brett Veach; Assistant general manager – Chris Shea; Assistant general manager – Mike Bradway; VP of player personnel – Tim Terry; VP of player personnel – Ryne Nutt; Senior personnel executive – Willie Davis; Co-directors of college scouting – Pat Sperduto and David Hinson; Assistant director of football administration – Jack Wolov; Head coaches: Head coach – Andy Reid; Assistant head coach/special teams coordinator – Dave Toub; Offensive coaches: Offensive coordinator – Matt Nagy; Pass game coordinator – Joe Bleymaier; Quarterbacks – David Girardi; Assistant quarterbacks – Dan Williams; Running backs – Todd Pinkston; Assistant running backs – Mark DeLeone; Wide receivers – Connor Embree; Tight ends – Tom Melvin; Offensive line – Andy Heck; Assistant offensive line – Corey Matthaei; Offensive assistant – Kevin Saxton	Defensive coaches: Defensive coordinator – Steve Spagnuolo; Defensive line – Joe Cullen; Assistant defensive line – Alex Whittingham; Linebackers – Brendan Daly; Outside linebackers – Rod Wilson; Defensive backs – Dave Merritt; Senior defensive assistant – Matt House; Defensive quality control – Louie Addazio; Defensive quality control – Chris Orr; Special teams coaches: Assistant special teams – Porter Ellett; Strength and conditioning: Vice President of sports medicine and performance – Rick Burkholder; Head strength and conditioning/director of sports science – Ryan Reynolds; Assistant strength and conditioning – Greg Carbin; Assistant strength and conditioning – Nick Cassetta; Assistant strength and conditioning – Spencer Reid

== Final roster ==
2025 Kansas City Chiefs roster
Quarterbacks (QB): 17 Shane Buechele; 19 Chris Oladokun; Running backs (RB): 29 Kareem Hunt; 10 Isiah Pacheco; 25 Dameon Pierce; 24 Brashard Smith; Wide receivers (WR): 5 Marquise Brown; 11 Jalen Royals; 9 JuJu Smith-Schuster; 1 Xavier Worthy; Tight ends (TE): 83 Noah Gray; 87 Travis Kelce; 85 Robert Tonyan; 12 Jared Wiley	Offensive linemen (OL): 66 Mike Caliendo G; 72 Chukwuebuka Godrick RT; 61 C. J. Hanson RG; 52 Creed Humphrey C; 77 Jaylon Moore RT; 60 Hunter Nourzad C; 79 Esa Pole LT; 65 Trey Smith RG; 76 Kingsley Suamataia LG; Defensive linemen (DL): 51 Mike Danna DE; 40 Ethan Downs DE; 97 Ashton Gillotte DE; 95 Chris Jones DT; 56 George Karlaftis DE; 92 Derrick Nnadi DT; 90 Charles Omenihu DE; 69 Mike Pennel NT; 93 Zacch Pickens DT; 99 Jerry Tillery DT	Linebackers (LB): 31 Jeffrey Bassa OLB; 32 Nick Bolton MLB; 48 Cole Christiansen OLB; 43 Jack Cochrane MLB; 59 Cooper McDonald MLB; 57 Tyreke Smith OLB; 23 Drue Tranquill OLB; Defensive backs (DB): 27 Chamarri Conner FS; 6 Bryan Cook FS; 34 Mike Edwards SS; 8 Kristian Fulton CB; 21 Jaden Hicks SS; 13 Nazeeh Johnson CB; 38 Kevin Knowles CB; 39 Melvin Smith CB; 2 Joshua Williams CB; 20 Nohl Williams CB; Special teams (ST): 14 Matt Araiza P; 7 Harrison Butker K; 41 James Winchester LS	Practice squad: 53 Kam Arnold OLB; 67 Nick Broeker LT; 89 Jason Brownlee WR; 26 Clyde Edwards-Helaire RB; 68 Marcus Harris DT; 94 Malik Herring DE; 82 Jimmy Holiday WR; 44 Tanner McCalister S; 42 Carson Steele FB; 96 Marlon Tuipulotu DT; 73 Matt Waletzko RT; 49 Tre Watson TE; Reserve: 91 Felix Anudike-Uzomah DE (IR); 88 Jake Briningstool TE (IR/DFR); 26 Deon Bush SS (IR); 54 Leo Chenal OLB (IR); 75 Ethan Driskell LT (NF-Ill.); 50 Brandon George MLB (IR); 38 Keaontay Ingram RB (IR); 15 Patrick Mahomes QB (IR); 22 Trent McDuffie CB (IR); 17 Gardner Minshew QB (IR); 64 Wanya Morris LT (IR); 55 Omarr Norman-Lott DT (IR); 81 Nikko Remigio WR (IR); 4 Rashee Rice WR (IR); 98 Janarius Robinson DE (IR); 30 Christian Roland-Wallace CB (IR); 45 Eric Scott Jr. CB (IR); 71 Josh Simmons LT (IR); 74 Jawaan Taylor RT (IR); 80 Tyquan Thornton WR (IR); 35 Jaylen Watson CB (IR); Rookies in italics 53 active, 21 reserve, 12 practice squad

== Preseason ==
Defensive end Felix Anudike-Uzomah, who was drafted by the Chiefs in the first round in 2023, was placed on injured reserve after suffering a hamstring injury in the preseason.

Week	Date	Opponent	Result	Record	Venue	Sources
1	August 9	at Arizona Cardinals	L 17–20	0–1	State Farm Stadium	
2	August 15	at Seattle Seahawks	L 16–33	0–2	Lumen Field	
3	August 22	Chicago Bears	L 27–29	0–3	Arrowhead Stadium	

== Regular season ==
=== Schedule ===
Week	Date	Opponent	Result	Record	Venue	Sources
1	September 5	at **Los Angeles Chargers**	**L** 21–27	0–1	(Brazil) Arena Corinthians (São Paulo)	Recap
2	September 14	Philadelphia Eagles	**L** 17–20	0–2	Arrowhead Stadium	Recap
3	September 21	at New York Giants	**W** 22–9	1–2	MetLife Stadium	Recap
4	September 28	Baltimore Ravens	**W** 37–20	2–2	Arrowhead Stadium	Recap
5	October 6	at Jacksonville Jaguars	**L** 28–31	2–3	EverBank Stadium	Recap
6	October 12	Detroit Lions	**W** 30–17	3–3	Arrowhead Stadium	Recap
7	October 19	**Las Vegas Raiders**	**W** 31–0	4–3	Arrowhead Stadium	Recap
8	October 27	Washington Commanders	**W** 28–7	5–3	Arrowhead Stadium	Recap
9	November 2	at Buffalo Bills	**L** 21–28	5–4	Highmark Stadium	Recap
10	Bye					
11	November 16	at **Denver Broncos**	**L** 19–22	5–5	Empower Field at Mile High	Recap
12	November 23	Indianapolis Colts	**W** 23–20 (OT)	6–5	Arrowhead Stadium	Recap
13	November 27	at Dallas Cowboys	**L** 28–31	6–6	AT&T Stadium	Recap
14	December 7	Houston Texans	**L** 10–20	6–7	Arrowhead Stadium	Recap
15	December 14	**Los Angeles Chargers**	**L** 13–16	6–8	Arrowhead Stadium	Recap
16	December 21	at Tennessee Titans	**L** 9–26	6–9	Nissan Stadium	Recap
17	December 25	**Denver Broncos**	**L** 13–20	6–10	Arrowhead Stadium	Recap
18	January 4	at **Las Vegas Raiders**	**L** 12–14	6–11	Allegiant Stadium	Recap

Note: Intra-division opponents are in bold text.

=== Game summaries ===
==== Week 1: at Los Angeles Chargers ====
NFL International Series

Week 1: Kansas City Chiefs at Los Angeles Chargers – Game summary

Quarter	1	2	3	4	Total
Chiefs	0	6	6	9	**21**
**Chargers**	7	6	7	7	**27**

at Arena Corinthians São Paulo, Brazil

- Date: September 5
- Game time: 9:00 p.m. BRT/7:00 p.m. CDT
- Game weather: Mostly cloudy, 62 °F (17 °C)
- Game attendance: 47,627
- Referee: Carl Cheffers
- TV announcers (KSHB/YouTube): Rich Eisen, Kurt Warner, Stacey Dales and Donald De La Haye
  Game exclusive to KSHB through syndication. Out of market on YouTube.
- Recap, Game Book

Game information

**First quarter**

- LAC – Quentin Johnston 5-yard pass from Justin Herbert (Cameron Dicker kick), 9:11. Chargers 7–0. **Drive: 7 plays, 68 yards, 4:15.**

**Second quarter**

- LAC – Cameron Dicker 39-yard field goal, 13:47. Chargers 10–0. **Drive: 9 plays, 58 yards, 4:40.**
- KC – Harrison Butker 35-yard field goal, 4:50. Chargers 10–3. **Drive: 16 plays, 49 yards, 8:57.**
- LAC – Cameron Dicker 36-yard field goal, 0:45. Chargers 13–3. **Drive: 12 plays, 47 yards, 4:05.**
- KC – Harrison Butker 59-yard field goal, 0:00. Chargers 13–6. **Drive: 5 plays, 31 yards, 0:45.**

**Third quarter**

- KC – Patrick Mahomes 11-yard run (kick missed, wide right), 8:05. Chargers 13–12. **Drive: 11 plays, 80 yards, 5:53.**
- LAC – Keenan Allen 11-yard pass from Justin Herbert (Cameron Dicker kick), 0:32. Chargers 20–12. **Drive: 12 plays, 74 yards, 7:33.**

**Fourth quarter**

- KC – Travis Kelce 37-yard pass from Patrick Mahomes (2-pt Conversion failed), 12:04. Chargers 20–18. **Drive: 7 plays, 65 yards, 3:28.**
- LAC – Quentin Johnston 23-yard pass from Justin Herbert (Cameron Dicker kick), 5:02. Chargers 27–18. **Drive: 11 plays, 74 yards, 7:02.**
- KC – Harrison Butker 27-yard field goal, 2:34. Chargers 27–21. **Drive: 10 plays, 63 yards, 2:28.**

**Top passers**

- KC – Patrick Mahomes – 24/39, 258 yards, TD
- LAC – Justin Herbert – 25/34, 318 yards, 3 TD

**Top rushers**

- KC – Patrick Mahomes – 6 rushes, 58 yards, TD
- LAC – Omarion Hampton – 15 rushes, 48 yards

**Top receivers**

- KC – Hollywood Brown – 10 receptions, 99 yards
- LAC – Quentin Johnston – 5 receptions, 79 yards, 2 TD

Early in the game, receiver Xavier Worthy was knocked out of the game with an injury after an collision with Travis Kelce, which contributed to a sluggish first half that was capped off by a two minute drill to kick a field goal at the end of the half. Despite a strong second half performance, the Chargers were able to run the clock out on their final possession following a run from Justin Herbert. With the loss, the Chiefs lost their season opener for the second time in three seasons and lost to the Chargers for the first time since 2021, and the first road loss to the Chargers since 2013.

==== Week 2: vs. Philadelphia Eagles ====
Week 2: Philadelphia Eagles at Kansas City Chiefs – Game summary

Quarter	1	2	3	4	Total
**Eagles**	7	3	3	7	**20**
Chiefs	0	10	0	7	**17**

at Arrowhead Stadium, Kansas City, Missouri

- Date: September 14
- Game time: 3:25 p.m. CDT
- Game weather: Fair, 88 °F (31 °C)
- Game attendance: 73,558
- Referee: Alex Kemp
- TV announcers (Fox): Kevin Burkhardt, Tom Brady, Erin Andrews and Tom Rinaldi
- Recap, Game Book

Game information

**First quarter**

- PHI – Saquon Barkley 13-yard run (Jake Elliott kick), 0:46. Eagles 7–0. **Drive: 8 plays, 52 yards, 4:08.**

**Second quarter**

- KC – Harrison Butker 56-yard field goal, 11:42. Eagles 7–3. **Drive: 8 plays, 31 yards, 4:04.**
- KC – Patrick Mahomes 13-yard run (Harrison Butker kick), 2:44. Chiefs 10–7. **Drive: 10 plays, 69 yards, 5:37.**
- PHI – Jake Elliott 58-yard field goal, 0:00. Tied 10–10. **Drive: 9 plays, 38 yards, 2:44.**

**Third quarter**

- PHI – Jake Elliott 51-yard field goal, 11:28. Eagles 13–10. **Drive: 4 plays, 2 yards, 1:28.**

**Fourth quarter**

- PHI – Jalen Hurts 1-yard run (Jake Elliott kick), 7:48. Eagles 20–10. **Drive: 10 plays, 59 yards, 5:08.**
- KC – Tyquan Thornton 49-yard pass from Patrick Mahomes (Harrison Butker kick), 3:00. Eagles 20–17. **Drive: 6 plays, 72 yards, 1:24.**

**Top passers**

- PHI – Jalen Hurts – 15/22, 101 yards
- KC – Patrick Mahomes – 16/29, 187 yards, TD, INT

**Top rushers**

- PHI – Saquon Barkley – 22 rushes, 88 yards, TD
- KC – Patrick Mahomes – 7 rushes, 66 yards, TD

**Top receivers**

- PHI – Devonta Smith – 4 receptions, 53 yards
- KC – Travis Kelce – 4 receptions, 61 yards

The game remained close throughout, until a game-deciding play occurred early in the fourth quarter. With the Chiefs in the Eagles' red zone, Patrick Mahomes threw a pass intended for Travis Kelce, but the ball bounced off Kelce’s hands and was intercepted by Eagles safety Andrew Mukuba. The turnover eventually led to a touchdown that put the game away for the Eagles.

With their 3rd straight loss to Philadelphia since 2023, the Chiefs started 0–2 for the first time since 2014. Including their defeat in Super Bowl LIX, it also marked the first time Mahomes has lost three consecutive starts. Additionally, this was the Chiefs' first home loss since 2023 Christmas Day, ending a 12-game home winning streak.

==== Week 3: at New York Giants ====
Week 3: Kansas City Chiefs at New York Giants – Game summary

Quarter	1	2	3	4	Total
**Chiefs**	3	6	7	6	**22**
Giants	0	6	0	3	**9**

at MetLife Stadium, East Rutherford, New Jersey

- Date: September 21
- Game time: 8:20 p.m. EDT/7:20 p.m. CDT
- Game weather: Fair, 65 °F (18 °C)
- Game attendance: 80,690
- Referee: Land Clark
- TV announcers (NBC): Mike Tirico, Cris Collinsworth and Melissa Stark
- Recap, Game Book

Game information

**First quarter**

- KC – Harrison Butker 54-yard field goal, 3:45. Chiefs 3–0. **Drive: 12 plays, 36 yards, 5:21.**

**Second quarter**

- KC – Harrison Butker 48-yard field goal, 9:48. Chiefs 6–0. **Drive: 9 plays, 51 yards, 5:23.**
- NYG – Cameron Skattebo 13-yard run (kick blocked), 1:44. Tied 6–6. **Drive: 8 plays, 70 yards, 3:40.**
- KC – Harrison Butker 28-yard field goal, 0:00. Chiefs 9–6. **Drive: 7 plays, 69 yards, 0:49.**

**Third quarter**

- KC – Tyquan Thornton 5-yard pass from Patrick Mahomes (Harrison Butker kick), 8:22. Chiefs 16–6. **Drive: 11 plays, 74 yards, 6:38.**

**Fourth quarter**

- NYG – Graham Gano 25-yard field goal, 10:12. Chiefs 16–9. **Drive: 12 plays, 73 yards, 5:57.**
- KC – Kareem Hunt 1-yard run (kick failed), 6:03. Chiefs 22–9. **Drive: 9 plays, 77 yards, 4:09.**

**Top passers**

- KC – Patrick Mahomes – 22/37, 224 yards, TD
- NYG – Russell Wilson – 18/32, 160 yards, 2 INT

**Top rushers**

- KC – Isiah Pacheco – 10 rushes, 45 yards
- NYG – Cameron Skattebo – 10 rushes, 60 yards, TD

**Top receivers**

- KC – Tyquan Thornton – 5 receptions, 71 yards, TD
- NYG – Cameron Skattebo – 6 receptions, 61 yards

With the win, the Chiefs avoided starting 0–3 for the first time since 2011. The Chiefs recorded their first-ever road victory against the Giants, snapping a seven-game road losing steak against them.

==== Week 4: vs. Baltimore Ravens ====
Week 4: Baltimore Ravens at Kansas City Chiefs – Game summary

Quarter	1	2	3	4	Total
Ravens	7	3	3	7	**20**
**Chiefs**	3	17	10	7	**37**

at Arrowhead Stadium, Kansas City, Missouri

- Date: September 28
- Game time: 3:25 p.m. CDT
- Game weather: Sunny, 89 °F (32 °C)
- Game attendance: 73,552
- Referee: Clay Martin
- TV announcers (CBS): Jim Nantz, Tony Romo and Tracy Wolfson
- Recap, Game Book

Game information

**First quarter**

- BAL – Justice Hill 11-yard pass from Lamar Jackson (Tyler Loop kick), 9:35. Ravens 7–0. **Drive: 9 plays, 70 yards, 5:25.**
- KC – Harrison Butker 38-yard field goal, 5:40. Ravens 7–3. **Drive: 9 plays, 48 yards, 3:55.**

**Second quarter**

- KC – Harrison Butker 23-yard field goal, 10:00. Ravens 7–6. **Drive: 14 plays, 79 yards, 6:44.**
- KC – JuJu Smith-Schuster 4-yard pass from Patrick Mahomes (Harrison Butker kick), 4:00. Chiefs 13–7. **Drive: 5 plays, 56 yards, 2:46.**
- KC – Isiah Pacheco 8-yard pass from Patrick Mahomes (Harrison Butker kick), 1:41. Chiefs 20–7. **Drive: 6 plays, 40 yards, 1:16.**
- BAL – Tyler Loop 43-yard field goal, 0:00. Chiefs 20–10. **Drive: 5 plays, 29 yards, 0:26.**

**Third quarter**

- KC – Tyquan Thornton 11-yard pass from Patrick Mahomes (Harrison Butker kick), 11:51. Chiefs 27–10. **Drive: 6 plays, 65 yards, 3:09.**
- BAL – Tyler Loop 32-yard field goal, 7:22. Chiefs 27–13. **Drive: 8 plays, 56 yards, 4:29.**
- KC – Harrison Butker 31-yard field goal, 1:06. Chiefs 30–13. **Drive: 10 plays, 39 yards, 6:16.**

**Fourth quarter**

- KC – Hollywood Brown 15-yard pass from Patrick Mahomes (Harrison Butker kick), 13:15. Chiefs 37–13. **Drive: 4 plays, 24 yards, 1:06.**
- BAL – Justice Hill 71-yard run (Tyler Loop kick), 1:56. Chiefs 37–20. **Drive: 3 plays, 86 yards, 1:33.**

**Top passers**

- BAL – Lamar Jackson – 14/20, 147 yards, TD, INT
- KC – Patrick Mahomes – 25/37, 270 yards, 4 TD

**Top rushers**

- BAL – Justice Hill – 3 rushes, 76 yards, TD
- KC – Xavier Worthy – 2 rushes, 38 yards

**Top receivers**

- BAL – Zay Flowers – 7 receptions, 74 yards
- KC – Xavier Worthy – 5 receptions, 83 yards

With the dominant win over the Ravens, the Chiefs improved to 2–2 on the season. They are now 6–1 against Baltimore since 2018.

==== Week 5: at Jacksonville Jaguars ====
Week 5: Kansas City Chiefs at Jacksonville Jaguars – Game summary

Quarter	1	2	3	4	Total
Chiefs	7	7	0	14	**28**
**Jaguars**	0	7	14	10	**31**

at EverBank Stadium, Jacksonville, Florida

- Date: October 6
- Game time: 8:15 p.m. EDT/7:15 p.m. CDT
- Game weather: Mostly clear, 80 °F (27 °C)
- Game attendance: 69,329
- Referee: Brad Rogers
- TV announcers (ESPN/ABC): Joe Buck, Troy Aikman, Lisa Salters and Laura Rutledge
- Recap, Game Book

Game information

**First quarter**

- KC – Travis Kelce 2-yard pass from Patrick Mahomes (Harrison Butker kick), 4:02. Chiefs 7–0. **Drive: 9 plays, 72 yards, 4:27.**

**Second quarter**

- KC – Patrick Mahomes 9-yard run (Harrison Butker kick), 10:44. Chiefs 14–0. **Drive: 5 plays, 97 yards, 2:52.**
- JAX – Parker Washington 3-yard pass from Trevor Lawrence (Cam Little kick), 2:38. Chiefs 14–7. **Drive: 13 plays, 70 yards, 8:06.**

**Third quarter**

- JAX – Trevor Lawrence 10-yard run (Cam Little kick), 8:40. Tied 14–14. **Drive: 7 plays, 87 yards, 4:35.**
- JAX – Devin Lloyd 99-yard interception return (Cam Little kick), 2:19. Jaguars 21–14.

**Fourth quarter**

- KC – Kareem Hunt 5-yard run (Harrison Butker kick), 12:20. Tied 21–21. **Drive: 2 plays, 19 yards, 0:43.**
- JAX – Cam Little 52-yard field goal, 8:08. Jaguars 24–21. **Drive: 8 plays, 25 yards, 4:12.**
- KC – Kareem Hunt 2-yard run (Harrison Butker kick), 1:45. Chiefs 28–24. **Drive: 12 plays, 86 yards, 6:23.**
- JAX – Trevor Lawrence 1-yard run (Cam Little kick), 0:23. Jaguars 31–28. **Drive: 7 plays, 60 yards, 1:22.**

**Top passers**

- KC – Patrick Mahomes – 29/41, 318 yards, TD, INT
- JAX – Trevor Lawrence – 18/25, 221 yards, TD, INT

**Top rushers**

- KC – Patrick Mahomes – 6 rushes, 60 yards, TD
- JAX – Trevor Lawrence – 10 rushes, 54 yards, 2 TD

**Top receivers**

- KC – Tyquan Thornton – 3 receptions, 90 yards
- JAX – Brian Thomas Jr. – 4 receptions, 80 yards

With the upset loss, the Chiefs fell to 2–3 for the first time since 2021 and lost to the Jaguars for the first time since the 2009 season, snapping an eight-game winning streak against them. This also marked Patrick Mahomes’s first loss against the Jaguars in his NFL career. In addition, this loss also dropped the Chiefs to an 0–3 record in one-score games, after they went 11–0 in one-score games the previous season.

==== Week 6: vs. Detroit Lions ====
Week 6: Detroit Lions at Kansas City Chiefs – Game summary

Quarter	1	2	3	4	Total
Lions	3	7	0	7	**17**
**Chiefs**	6	7	7	10	**30**

at Arrowhead Stadium, Kansas City, Missouri

- Date: October 12
- Game time: 7:20 p.m. CDT
- Game weather: Mostly cloudy, 85 °F (29 °C)
- Game attendance: 73,543
- Referee: Craig Wrolstad
- TV announcers (NBC): Mike Tirico, Cris Collinsworth and Melissa Stark
- Recap, Game Book

Game information

**First quarter**

- DET – Jake Bates 28-yard field goal, 5:21. Lions 3–0. **Drive: 15 plays, 61 yards, 9:39.**
- KC – Xavier Worthy 6-yard pass from Patrick Mahomes (kick failed), 1:11. Chiefs 6–3. **Drive: 8 plays, 70 yards, 4:10.**

**Second quarter**

- DET – Jameson Williams 22-yard pass from Jared Goff (Jake Bates kick), 12:49. Lions 10–6. **Drive: 6 plays, 71 yards, 3:22.**
- KC – Patrick Mahomes 1-yard run (Harrison Butker kick), 0:37. Chiefs 13–10. **Drive: 8 plays, 55 yards, 2:05.**

**Third quarter**

- KC – Hollywood Brown 9-yard pass from Patrick Mahomes (Harrison Butker kick), 11:18. Chiefs 20–10. **Drive: 8 plays, 81 yards, 3:42.**

**Fourth quarter**

- DET – Sam LaPorta 4-yard pass from Jared Goff (Jake Bates kick), 14:14. Chiefs 20–17. **Drive: 8 plays, 81 yards, 4:20.**
- KC – Hollywood Brown 3-yard pass from Patrick Mahomes (Harrison Butker kick), 9:30. Chiefs 27–17. **Drive: 9 plays, 69 yards, 4:44.**
- KC – Harrison Butker 33-yard field goal, 2:26. Chiefs 30–17. **Drive: 10 plays, 34 yards, 4:46.**

**Top passers**

- DET – Jared Goff – 23/29, 203 yards, 2 TD
- KC – Patrick Mahomes – 22/30, 257 yards, 3 TD

**Top rushers**

- DET – Jahmyr Gibbs – 17 rushes, 65 yards
- KC – Isiah Pacheco – 12 rushes, 51 yards

**Top receivers**

- DET – Jameson Williams – 6 receptions, 66 yards, TD
- KC – Travis Kelce – 6 receptions, 78 yards

With the win, the Chiefs improved to 3–3, and their record improved to .500. Patrick Mahomes recorded his 302nd career touchdown pass, including the postseason, becoming the fastest player in NFL history to reach 300 touchdown passes. He accomplished the feat in just 139 games, eight fewer than the previous record holder, Aaron Rodgers.

At the end of the game, Mahomes attempted to give a high-five to Lions safety Brian Branch as they met near midfield. However, Branch walked past Mahomes without acknowledging him. Chiefs wide receiver JuJu Smith-Schuster confronted Branch over that. In response, Branch threw a right hook that knocked Smith-Schuster to the ground, sparking a fight. The NFL later announced that Branch would be suspended one game for his actions.

==== Week 7: vs. Las Vegas Raiders ====
Week 7: Las Vegas Raiders at Kansas City Chiefs – Game summary

Quarter	1	2	3	4	Total
Raiders	0	0	0	0	**0**
**Chiefs**	7	14	10	0	**31**

at Arrowhead Stadium, Kansas City, Missouri

- Date: October 19
- Game time: 12:00 p.m. CDT
- Game weather: Fair, 57 °F (14 °C)
- Game attendance: 73,584
- Referee: Clete Blakeman
- TV announcers (CBS): Jim Nantz, Tony Romo and Tracy Wolfson
- Recap, Game Book

Game information

**First quarter**

- KC – Rashee Rice 2-yard pass from Patrick Mahomes (Harrison Butker kick), 5:58. Chiefs 7–0. **Drive: 9 plays, 92 yards, 5:46.**

**Second quarter**

- KC – Hollywood Brown 8-yard pass from Patrick Mahomes (Harrison Butker kick), 9:17. Chiefs 14–0. **Drive: 17 plays, 84 yards, 8:40.**
- KC – Rashee Rice 3-yard pass from Patrick Mahomes (Harrison Butker kick), 0:10. Chiefs 21–0. **Drive: 16 plays, 94 yards, 6:22.**

**Third quarter**

- KC – Isiah Pacheco 7-yard run (Harrison Butker kick), 9:00. Chiefs 28–0. **Drive: 11 plays, 65 yards, 6:00.**
- KC – Harrison Butker 38-yard field goal, 2:36. Chiefs 31–0. **Drive: 9 plays, 66 yards, 4:26.**

**Fourth quarter**

- No scoring plays

**Top passers**

- LV – Geno Smith – 10/16, 67 yards
- KC – Patrick Mahomes – 26/35, 286 yards, 3 TD

**Top rushers**

- LV – Ashton Jeanty – 6 rushes, 21 yards
- KC – Isiah Pacheco – 15 rushes, 57 yards, TD

**Top receivers**

- LV – Tre Tucker – 5 receptions, 33 yards
- KC – Travis Kelce – 3 receptions, 54 yards

This was the Chiefs' first shutout win since defeating the Houston Texans 30–0 in the AFC Wild Card round of the 2015–16 NFL playoffs, and their first regular season shutout victory since coincidentally beating the then-Oakland Raiders 28–0 during the 2011 season.

==== Week 8: vs. Washington Commanders ====
Week 8: Washington Commanders at Kansas City Chiefs – Game summary

Quarter	1	2	3	4	Total
Commanders	0	7	0	0	**7**
**Chiefs**	0	7	14	7	**28**

at Arrowhead Stadium, Kansas City, Missouri

- Date: October 27
- Game time: 7:15 p.m. CDT
- Game weather: Cloudy, 54 °F (12 °C)
- Game attendance: 73,569
- Referee: Brad Allen
- TV announcers (ESPN/ABC): Joe Buck, Troy Aikman, Lisa Salters, and Laura Rutledge
- Recap, Game Book

Game information

**First quarter**

- No scoring plays

**Second quarter**

- KC – Kareem Hunt 1-yard run (Harrison Butker kick), 5:46. Chiefs 7–0. **Drive: 9 plays, 72 yards, 4:39.**
- WAS – Terry McLaurin 11-yard pass from Marcus Mariota (Matthew Wright kick), 0:58. Tied 7–7. **Drive: 10 plays, 66 yards, 4:48.**

**Third quarter**

- KC – Kareem Hunt 2-yard pass from Patrick Mahomes (Harrison Butker kick), 10:12. Chiefs 14–7. **Drive: 8 plays, 80 yards, 4:48.**
- KC – Travis Kelce 10-yard pass from Patrick Mahomes (Harrison Butker kick), 3:20. Chiefs 21–7. **Drive: 8 plays, 75 yards, 4:45.**

**Fourth quarter**

- KC – Rashee Rice 18-yard pass from Patrick Mahomes (Harrison Butker kick), 7:52. Chiefs 28–7. **Drive: 13 plays, 94 yards, 7:02.**

**Top passers**

- WAS – Marcus Mariota – 21/30, 213 yards, TD, 2 INT
- KC – Patrick Mahomes – 25/34, 299 yards, 3 TD, 2 INT

**Top rushers**

- WAS – Marcus Mariota – 8 rushes, 28 yards
- KC – Isiah Pacheco – 12 rushes, 58 yards

**Top receivers**

- WAS – Jeremy McNichols – 5 receptions, 64 yards
- KC – Travis Kelce – 6 receptions, 99 yards, TD

The Chiefs extended their winning streak against the Commanders to nine with the win. They also continued their streak of never having lost to Washington at home.

With the win, the Chiefs improved to 5–3.

==== Week 9: at Buffalo Bills ====
Week 9: Kansas City Chiefs at Buffalo Bills – Game summary

Quarter	1	2	3	4	Total
Chiefs	0	13	0	8	**21**
**Bills**	7	14	7	0	**28**

at Highmark Stadium, Orchard Park, New York

- Date: November 2
- Game time: 4:25 p.m. EST/3:25 p.m. CST
- Game weather: Fair, 54 °F (12 °C)
- Game attendance: 71,024
- Referee: Carl Cheffers
- TV announcers (CBS): Jim Nantz, Tony Romo and Tracy Wolfson
- Recap, Game Book

Game information

**First quarter**

- BUF – Dalton Kincaid 23-yard pass from Josh Allen (Matt Prater kick), 8:00. Bills 7–0. **Drive: 11 plays, 84 yards, 7:00.**

**Second quarter**

- KC – Rashee Rice 3-yard run (Harrison Butker kick), 14:56. Tied 7–7. **Drive: 7 plays, 53 yards, 4:21.**
- KC – Harrison Butker 46-yard field goal, 9:27. Chiefs 10–7. **Drive: 7 plays, 36 yards, 3:20.**
- BUF – Ty Johnson 3-yard run (Matt Prater kick), 6:39. Bills 14–10. **Drive: 5 plays, 70 yards, 2:48.**
- BUF – Josh Allen 1-yard run (Matt Prater kick), 1:33. Bills 21–10. **Drive: 7 plays, 60 yards, 2:39.**
- KC – Harrison Butker 19-yard field goal, 0:03. Bills 21–13. **Drive: 7 plays, 66 yards, 1:30.**

**Third quarter**

- BUF – Josh Allen 1-yard run (Matt Prater kick), 1:34. Bills 28–13. **Drive: 8 plays, 74 yards, 3:57.**

**Fourth quarter**

- KC – Kareem Hunt 2-yard run (Patrick Mahomes–Travis Kelce pass), 11:32. Bills 28–21. **Drive: 11 plays, 66 yards, 5:02.**

**Top passers**

- KC – Patrick Mahomes – 15/34, 250 yards, INT
- BUF – Josh Allen – 23/26, 273 yards, TD

**Top rushers**

- KC – Kareem Hunt – 11 rushes, 49 yards, TD
- BUF – James Cook – 27 rushes, 114 yards

**Top receivers**

- KC – Rashee Rice – 4 receptions, 80 yards
- BUF – Dalton Kincaid – 6 receptions, 101 yards, TD

Patrick Mahomes struggled against the Bills' defense, finishing with a career-worst 44.1% completion rate while completing 15 of 34 passes for 250 yards and an interception. It marked the first time in his regular-season career that he completed fewer than 50% of his pass attempts. With their fifth straight regular season loss to the Bills, the Chiefs fell to 5–4.

==== Week 11: at Denver Broncos ====
Week 11: Kansas City Chiefs at Denver Broncos – Game summary

Quarter	1	2	3	4	Total
Chiefs	3	3	7	6	**19**
**Broncos**	6	0	7	9	**22**

at Empower Field at Mile High, Denver, Colorado

- Date: November 16
- Game time: 3:25 p.m. CST/2:25 p.m. MST
- Game weather: Sunny, 70 °F (21 °C)
- Game attendance: 75,911
- Referee: Adrian Hill
- TV announcers (CBS): Jim Nantz, Tony Romo and Tracy Wolfson
- Recap, Game Book

Game information

**First quarter**

- DEN – Wil Lutz 29-yard field goal, 7:36. Broncos 3–0. **Drive: 14 plays, 54 yards, 7:24.**
- DEN – Wil Lutz 24-yard field goal, 4:53. Broncos 6–0. **Drive: 4 plays, 5 yards, 1:28.**
- KC – Harrison Butker 31-yard field goal, 0:49. Broncos 6–3. **Drive: 9 plays, 59 yards, 4:04.**

**Second quarter**

- KC – Harrison Butker 31-yard field goal, 4:38. Tied 6–6. **Drive: 16 plays, 77 yards, 9:32.**

**Third quarter**

- DEN – Jaleel McLaughlin 4-yard run (Wil Lutz kick), 4:03. Broncos 13–6. **Drive: 11 plays, 89 yards, 6:01.**
- KC – Kareem Hunt 2-yard run (Harrison Butker kick), 0:49. Tied 13–13. **Drive: 6 plays, 75 yards, 3:14.**

**Fourth quarter**

- DEN – Wil Lutz 38-yard field goal, 12:50. Broncos 16–13. **Drive: 8 plays, 60 yards, 2:59.**
- KC – Travis Kelce 21-yard pass from Patrick Mahomes (kick blocked), 9:57. Chiefs 19–16. **Drive: 6 plays, 73 yards, 2:53.**
- DEN – Wil Lutz 54-yard field goal, 4:10. Tied 19–19. **Drive: 6 plays, 19 yards, 2:20.**
- DEN – Wil Lutz 35-yard field goal, 0:00. Broncos 22–19. **Drive: 10 plays, 58 yards, 2:59.**

**Top passers**

- KC – Patrick Mahomes – 29/45, 276 yards, TD, INT
- DEN – Bo Nix – 24/37, 295 yards

**Top rushers**

- KC – Kareem Hunt – 13 rushes, 59 yards, TD
- DEN – RJ Harvey – 11 rushes, 30 yards

**Top receivers**

- KC – Travis Kelce – 9 receptions, 91 yards, TD
- DEN – Troy Franklin – 4 receptions, 84 yards

After a close game, Broncos kicker Wil Lutz kicked a 35-yard field goal on the final play to defeat the Chiefs, giving Denver revenge and reversing the outcome of the teams’ meeting in Kansas City the previous season, when Lutz’s potential game-winning field goal as time expired was blocked. With their second straight loss to Denver, the Chiefs fell to 5–5 while 1–2 against the AFC West.

Tight end Travis Kelce caught his 84th career touchdown, becoming the Chiefs’ all-time franchise leader in touchdowns and surpassing running back Priest Holmes’s previous record of 83.

==== Week 12: vs. Indianapolis Colts ====
Week 12: Indianapolis Colts at Kansas City Chiefs – Game summary

Quarter	1	2	3	4	OT	Total
Colts	7	7	6	0	0	**20**
**Chiefs**	0	9	0	11	3	**23**

at Arrowhead Stadium, Kansas City, Missouri

- Date: November 23
- Game time: 12:00 p.m. CST
- Game weather: Fair, 46 °F (8 °C)
- Game attendance: 73,611
- Referee: Alex Moore
- TV announcers (CBS): Jim Nantz, Tony Romo and Tracy Wolfson
- Recap, Game Book

Game information

**First quarter**

- IND – Michael Pittman Jr. 6-yard pass from Daniel Jones (Michael Badgley kick), 8:11. Colts 7–0. **Drive: 2 plays, 3 yards, 0:43.**

**Second quarter**

- KC – Harrison Butker 28-yard field goal, 14:51. Colts 7–3. **Drive: 17 plays, 64 yards, 8:20.**
- IND – Drew Ogletree 4-yard pass from Daniel Jones (Michael Badgley kick), 10:31. Colts 14–3. **Drive: 8 plays, 75 yards, 4:20.**
- KC – Harrison Butker 48-yard field goal, 2:19. Colts 14–6. **Drive: 13 plays, 48 yards, 8:12.**
- KC – Harrison Butker 22-yard field goal, 0:07. Colts 14–9. **Drive: 10 plays, 81 yards, 1:34.**

**Third quarter**

- IND – Michael Badgley 32-yard field goal, 9:12. Colts 17–9. **Drive: 8 plays, 49 yards, 4:03.**
- IND – Michael Badgley 23-yard field goal, 1:26. Colts 20–9. **Drive: 11 plays, 69 yards, 4:49.**

**Fourth quarter**

- KC – Kareem Hunt 2-yard run (Patrick Mahomes–Rashee Rice pass), 8:37. Colts 20–17. **Drive: 11 plays, 56 yards, 5:09.**
- KC – Harrison Butker 25-yard field goal, 0:00. Tied 20–20. **Drive: 15 plays, 87 yards, 4:43.**

**Overtime**

- KC – Harrison Butker 27-yard field goal, 1:57. Chiefs 23–20. **Drive: 12 plays, 81 yards, 5:56.**

**Top passers**

- IND – Daniel Jones – 19/31, 181 yards, 2 TD
- KC – Patrick Mahomes – 29/46, 352 yards, INT

**Top rushers**

- IND – Jonathan Taylor – 16 rushes, 58 yards
- KC – Kareem Hunt – 30 rushes, 104 yards, TD

**Top receivers**

- IND – Ashton Dulin – 1 reception, 48 yards
- KC – Rashee Rice – 8 receptions, 141 yards

Although the Colts led 20–9 entering the fourth quarter, the Chiefs rallied. Kansas City's defense forced the Colts to go three-and-out on each of their final four possessions, and the Chiefs eventually kicked the game-winning field goal in overtime. Patrick Mahomes threw for a season-high 352 yards.

==== Week 13: at Dallas Cowboys ====
Thanksgiving Day games

Week 13: Kansas City Chiefs at Dallas Cowboys – Game summary

Quarter	1	2	3	4	Total
Chiefs	14	0	0	14	**28**
**Cowboys**	7	10	3	11	**31**

at AT&T Stadium, Arlington, Texas

- Date: November 27
- Game time: 3:30 p.m. CST
- Game weather: None (retractable roof closed)
- Game attendance: 93,739
- Referee: John Hussey
- TV announcers (CBS): Jim Nantz, Tomy Romo and Tracy Wolfson
- Recap, Game Book

Game information

**First quarter**

- KC – Rashee Rice 27-yard pass from Patrick Mahomes (Harrison Butker kick), 13:04. Chiefs 7–0. **Drive: 2 plays, 37 yards, 0:36.**
- DAL – CeeDee Lamb 15-yard pass from Dak Prescott (Brandon Aubrey kick), 6:50. Tied 7–7. **Drive: 12 plays, 75 yards, 6:14.**
- KC – Travis Kelce 2-yard pass from Patrick Mahomes (Harrison Butker kick), 0:01. Chiefs 14–7. **Drive: 12 plays, 72 yards, 6:49.**

**Second quarter**

- DAL – Brandon Aubrey 49-yard field goal, 10:22. Chiefs 14–10. **Drive: 10 plays, 53 yards, 4:39.**
- DAL – Malik Davis 43-yard run (Brandon Aubrey kick), 3:10. Cowboys 17–14. **Drive: 8 plays, 85 yards, 2:53.**

**Third quarter**

- DAL – Brandon Aubrey 36-yard field goal, 4:09. Cowboys 20–14. **Drive: 7 plays, 78 yards, 2:56.**

**Fourth quarter**

- KC – Rashee Rice 3-yard pass from Patrick Mahomes (Harrison Butker kick), 14:51. Chiefs 21–20. **Drive: 11 plays, 80 yards, 4:18.**
- DAL – Javonte Williams 3-yard pass from Dak Prescott (Dak Prescott–George Pickens pass), 11:15. Cowboys 28–21. **Drive: 8 plays, 68 yards, 3:36.**
- DAL – Brandon Aubrey 26-yard field goal, 5:16. Cowboys 31–21. **Drive: 8 plays, 82 yards, 4:10.**
- KC – Hollywood Brown 10-yard pass from Patrick Mahomes (Harrison Butker kick), 3:27. Cowboys 31–28. **Drive: 7 plays, 67 yards, 1:49.**

**Top passers**

- KC – Patrick Mahomes – 23/34, 261 yards, 4 TD
- DAL – Dak Prescott – 27/39, 320 yards, 2 TD, INT

**Top rushers**

- KC – Kareem Hunt – 14 rushes, 58 yards
- DAL – Javonte Williams – 17 rushes, 59 yards

**Top receivers**

- KC – Rashee Rice – 8 receptions, 92 yards, 2 TD
- DAL – CeeDee Lamb – 7 receptions, 112 yards, TD

With the loss, the Chiefs fell to 6–6 for the first time since 2017 and finished 2–2 against the NFC East and 3–2 against the NFC.

The game was watched by 57.2 million viewers, becoming the most watched NFL regular season game ever, shattering the previous record by more than 15 million viewers.

==== Week 14: vs. Houston Texans ====
Week 14: Houston Texans at Kansas City Chiefs – Game summary

Quarter	1	2	3	4	Total
**Texans**	3	7	0	10	**20**
Chiefs	0	0	10	0	**10**

at Arrowhead Stadium, Kansas City, Missouri

- Date: December 7
- Game time: 7:20 p.m. CST
- Game weather: Fair, 27 °F (−3 °C)
- Game attendance: 73,611
- Referee: Alan Eck
- TV announcers (NBC): Mike Tirico, Cris Collinsworth and Melissa Stark
- Recap, Game Book

Game information

**First quarter**

- HOU – Ka'imi Fairbairn 35-yard field goal, 4:18. Texans 3–0. **Drive: 5 plays, 51 yards, 2:27.**

**Second quarter**

- HOU – Woody Marks 9-yard pass from C. J. Stroud (Ka'imi Fairbairn kick), 9:24. Texans 10–0. **Drive: 10 plays, 90 yards, 5:30.**

**Third quarter**

- KC – Kareem Hunt 2-yard run (Harrison Butker kick), 9:52. Texans 10–7. **Drive: 8 plays, 56 yards, 4:08.**
- KC – Harrison Butker 36-yard field goal, 1:50. Tied 10–10. **Drive: 7 plays, 30 yards, 2:45.**

**Fourth quarter**

- HOU – Dare Ogunbowale 5-yard run (Ka'imi Fairbairn kick), 6:56. Texans 17–10. **Drive: 6 plays, 31 yards, 3:22.**
- HOU – Ka'imi Fairbairn 28-yard field goal, 0:30. Texans 20–10. **Drive: 7 plays, 16 yards, 3:02.**

**Top passers**

- HOU – C. J. Stroud – 15/31, 203 yards, TD
- KC – Patrick Mahomes – 14/33, 160 yards, 3 INT

**Top rushers**

- HOU – Woody Marks – 26 rushes, 68 yards
- KC – Patrick Mahomes – 7 rushes, 59 yards

**Top receivers**

- HOU – Nico Collins – 4 receptions, 121 yards
- KC – Xavier Worthy – 3 receptions, 55 yards

In a game-deciding sequence, the Chiefs, facing 4th-and-1 at their own 31, decided to go for it, but Mahomes’ pass fell incomplete with just over 10 minutes remaining. Six plays later, Texans running back Dare Ogunbowale rushed for a 5-yard touchdown to give Houston the lead that they would not relinquish. This marked the Chiefs first loss to the Texans since 2019, officially snapping a six game win streak against them.

With the loss, the Chiefs' streak of nine straight AFC West division titles was snapped. It was Kansas City's first loss of the season by more than one score.

==== Week 15: vs. Los Angeles Chargers ====
Week 15: Los Angeles Chargers at Kansas City Chiefs – Game summary

Quarter	1	2	3	4	Total
**Chargers**	3	7	6	0	**16**
Chiefs	7	6	0	0	**13**

at Arrowhead Stadium, Kansas City, Missouri

- Date: December 14
- Game time: 12:00 p.m. CST
- Game weather: Fair, 15 °F (−9 °C)
- Game attendance: 73,073
- Referee: Shawn Hochuli
- TV announcers (CBS): Kevin Harlan, Trent Green and Melanie Collins
- Recap, Game Book

Game information

**First quarter**

- KC – Patrick Mahomes 12-yard run (Harrison Butker kick), 8:52. Chiefs 7–0. **Drive: 11 plays, 68 yards, 6:08.**
- LAC – Cameron Dicker 49-yard field goal, 2:30. Chiefs 7–3. **Drive: 11 plays, 41 yards, 6:22.**

**Second quarter**

- KC – Harrison Butker 27-yard field goal, 8:04. Chiefs 10–3. **Drive: 7 plays, 10 yards, 2:55.**
- KC – Harrison Butker 47-yard field goal, 0:38. Chiefs 13–3. **Drive: 10 plays, 65 yards, 2:12.**
- LAC – KeAndre Lambert-Smith 16-yard pass from Justin Herbert (Cameron Dicker kick), 0:05. Chiefs 13–10. **Drive: 5 plays, 60 yards, 0:33.**

**Third quarter**

- LAC – Cameron Dicker 23-yard field goal, 8:55. Tied 13–13. **Drive: 11 plays, 66 yards, 6:05.**
- LAC – Cameron Dicker 49-yard field goal, 0:51. Chargers 16–13. **Drive: 5 plays, 29 yards, 2:40.**

**Fourth quarter**

- No scoring plays

**Top passers**

- LAC – Justin Herbert – 19/29, 210 yards, TD, INT
- KC – Patrick Mahomes – 16/28, 189 yards, INT

**Top rushers**

- LAC – Omarion Hampton – 15 rushes, 61 yards
- KC – Isiah Pacheco – 11 rushes, 21 yards

**Top receivers**

- LAC – Oronde Gadsden II – 4 receptions, 61 yards
- KC – Travis Kelce – 7 receptions, 70 yards

With two minutes left in the game and the Chiefs driving into Chargers territory with a chance to tie, Patrick Mahomes suffered a non-contact injury to his left knee and was quickly ruled out. Backup quarterback Gardner Minshew took over and, on a game-deciding play, threw an interception to Chargers safety Derwin James, sealing the loss.

With the upset loss, the Chiefs were eliminated from playoff contention for the first time since 2014. They were also swept by the Chargers for the first time since 2013 and swept by an AFC West rival for the first time since the 2014 Broncos.

It was later revealed through an MRI that Mahomes suffered a torn ACL in his left knee and would miss the remainder of the season.

==== Week 16: at Tennessee Titans ====
Week 16: Kansas City Chiefs at Tennessee Titans – Game summary

Quarter	1	2	3	4	Total
Chiefs	0	6	3	0	**9**
**Titans**	0	9	7	10	**26**

at Nissan Stadium, Nashville, Tennessee

- Date: December 21
- Game time: 12:00 p.m. CST
- Game weather: Sunny, 51 °F (11 °C)
- Game attendance: 61,752
- Referee: Clete Blakeman
- TV announcers (CBS): Kevin Harlan, Trent Green and Melanie Collins
- Recap, Game Book

Game information

**First quarter**

- No scoring plays

**Second quarter**

- TEN – Kareem Hunt loss of 2 yards for a safety, 13:06. Titans 2–0.
- KC – Harrison Butker 54-yard field goal, 7:40. Chiefs 3–2. **Drive: 9 plays, 28 yards, 3:59.**
- TEN – Chig Okonkwo 7-yard pass from Cam Ward (Joey Slye kick), 1:37. Titans 9–3. **Drive: 11 plays, 89 yards, 6:03.**
- KC – Harrison Butker 41-yard field goal, 0:06. Titans 9–6. **Drive: 7 plays, 45 yards, 1:31.**

**Third quarter**

- TEN – Chimere Dike 1-yard pass from Cam Ward (Joey Slye kick), 10:32. Titans 16–6. **Drive: 9 plays, 75 yards, 4:28.**
- KC – Harrison Butker 27-yard field goal, 3:00. Titans 16–9. **Drive: 6 plays, 41 yards, 3:22.**

**Fourth quarter**

- TEN – Tyjae Spears 4-yard run (Joey Slye kick), 11:56. Titans 23–9. **Drive: 10 plays, 64 yards, 6:04.**
- TEN – Joey Slye 27-yard field goal, 3:44. Titans 26–9. **Drive: 13 plays, 57 yards, 6:17.**

**Top passers**

- KC – Chris Oladokun – 11/16, 111 yards
- TEN – Cam Ward – 21/28, 228 yards, 2 TD

**Top rushers**

- KC – Isiah Pacheco – 8 rushes, 34 yards
- TEN – Tony Pollard – 21 rushes, 102 yards

**Top receivers**

- KC – Isiah Pacheco – 6 receptions, 41 yards
- TEN – Elic Ayomanor – 3 receptions, 58 yards

Gardner Minshew was knocked out of the game, forcing the Chiefs to start their third-string quarterback, Chris Oladokun.

With the upset loss, the Chiefs were guaranteed their first losing season since 2012 and they finished 1–3 against the AFC South.

==== Week 17: vs. Denver Broncos ====
Christmas Day games

Week 17: Denver Broncos at Kansas City Chiefs – Game summary

Quarter	1	2	3	4	Total
**Broncos**	3	3	7	7	**20**
Chiefs	0	7	3	3	**13**

at Arrowhead Stadium, Kansas City, Missouri

- Date: December 25
- Game time: 7:15 p.m. CST
- Game weather: Clear, 57 °F (14 °C)
- Game attendance: 73,045
- Referee: Bill Vinovich
- TV announcers (KSHB/Prime Video): Al Michaels, Kirk Herbstreit and Kaylee Hartung
  Game exclusive to KSHB through syndication. Out of market on Prime Video.
- Recap, Game Book

Game information

**First quarter**

- DEN – Wil Lutz 27-yard field goal, 6:58. Broncos 3–0. **Drive: 14 plays, 56 yards, 8:02.**

**Second quarter**

- KC – Brashard Smith 5-yard pass from Chris Oladokun (Harrison Butker kick), 12:49. Chiefs 7–3. **Drive: 10 plays, 35 yards, 5:04.**
- DEN – Wil Lutz 30-yard field goal, 0:19. Chiefs 7–6. **Drive: 16 plays, 79 yards, 8:04.**

**Third quarter**

- KC – Harrison Butker 53-yard field goal, 11:42. Chiefs 10–6. **Drive: 6 plays, 28 yards, 3:18.**
- DEN – Bo Nix 9-yard run (Wil Lutz kick), 1:55. Broncos 13–10. **Drive: 14 plays, 72 yards, 9:47.**

**Fourth quarter**

- KC – Harrison Butker 47-yard field goal, 8:03. Tied 13–13. **Drive: 6 plays, 16 yards, 2:56.**
- DEN – RJ Harvey 1-yard pass from Bo Nix (Wil Lutz kick), 1:45. Broncos 20–13. **Drive: 14 plays, 65 yards, 6:18.**

**Top passers**

- DEN – Bo Nix – 26/38, 182 yards, TD, INT
- KC – Chris Oladokun – 13/22, 66 yards, TD

**Top rushers**

- DEN – RJ Harvey – 14 rushes, 43 yards
- KC – Kareem Hunt – 7 rushes, 38 yards

**Top receivers**

- DEN – Courtland Sutton – 4 receptions, 40 yards
- KC – Travis Kelce – 5 receptions, 36 yards

Although the Chiefs were down to their third-string quarterback, Chris Oladokun, and several starters were out, and entered the game as double-digit underdogs, they remained competitive against the Broncos. However, a game-deciding play occurred late in the fourth quarter when the Broncos faced fourth-and-2 inside the 10-yard line and did not intend to snap the ball. Chris Jones jumped offsides, giving Denver a fresh set of downs, which eventually led to a go-ahead touchdown that sealed a Broncos victory.

With the loss, the Chiefs’ nine-game home winning streak against the Broncos came to an end, marking their first home defeat to Denver since the 2015 season. Additionally, the Chiefs were swept by the Broncos for the first time since the 2014 season.

==== Week 18: at Las Vegas Raiders ====
Week 18: Kansas City Chiefs at Las Vegas Raiders – Game summary

Quarter	1	2	3	4	Total
Chiefs	3	0	3	6	**12**
**Raiders**	0	6	0	8	**14**

at Allegiant Stadium, Paradise, Nevada

- Date: January 4
- Game time: 3:25 p.m. CST/1:25 p.m. PST
- Game weather: None (indoor stadium)
- Game attendance: 61,780
- Referee: Craig Wrolstad
- TV announcers (CBS): Chris Lewis, Kyle Long and Tiffany Blackmon
- Recap, Game Book

Game information

**First quarter**

- KC – Harrison Butker 36-yard field goal, 4:58. Chiefs 3–0. **Drive: 8 plays, 36 yards, 3:33.**

**Second quarter**

- LV – Daniel Carlson 32-yard field goal, 7:20. Tied 3–3. **Drive: 8 plays, 30 yards, 4:17.**
- LV – Daniel Carlson 23-yard field goal, 1:52. Raiders 6–3. **Drive: 4 plays, 13 yards, 1:05.**

**Third quarter**

- KC – Harrison Butker 40-yard field goal, 4:11. Tied 6–6. **Drive: 12 plays, 50 yards, 7:33.**

**Fourth quarter**

- LV – Daniel Carlson 55-yard field goal, 13:16. Raiders 9–6. **Drive: 10 plays, 29 yards, 5:55.**
- LV – Shane Buechele sacked in the end zone for a safety, 4:37. Raiders 11–6.
- KC – Harrison Butker 47-yard field goal, 3:33. Raiders 11–9. **Drive: 4 plays, -8 yards, 0:57.**
- KC – Harrison Butker 41-yard field goal, 1:01. Chiefs 12–11. **Drive: 5 plays, 51 yards, 1:22.**
- LV – Daniel Carlson 60-yard field goal, 0:08. Raiders 14–12. **Drive: 5 plays, 26 yards, 0:53.**

**Top passers**

- KC – Shane Buechele – 7/14, 88 yards
- LV – Aidan O'Connell – 10/22, 102 yards

**Top rushers**

- KC – Brashard Smith – 12 rushes, 56 yards
- LV – Ashton Jeanty – 26 rushes, 87 yards

**Top receivers**

- KC – Hollywood Brown – 3 receptions, 64 yards
- LV – Michael Mayer – 3 receptions, 47 yards

With the upset loss, their first road loss to the Raiders since 2017, the Chiefs finished out their season on a 6-game losing streak, close out 6–11, 1–5 against the AFC West and 1–7 on the road.

=== Standings ===
==== Division ====
AFC West
	W	L	T	PCT	DIV	CONF	PF	PA	STK
^{(1)} Denver Broncos	14	3	0	.824	5–1	9–3	401	311	W2
^{(7)} Los Angeles Chargers	11	6	0	.647	5–1	8–4	368	340	L2
Kansas City Chiefs	6	11	0	.353	1–5	3–9	362	328	L6
Las Vegas Raiders	3	14	0	.176	1–5	3–9	241	432	W1

==== Conference ====
AFC
Seed	Team	Division	W	L	T	PCT	DIV	CONF	SOS	SOV	STK
**Division leaders**
1 (Note: Denver finished ahead of New England based on common games (Denver 6–0 to New England 5–1 against: Cincinnati, Las Vegas, NY Giants, NY Jets and Tennessee).)	Denver Broncos	West	14	3	0	.824	5–1	9–3	.422	.378	W2
2	New England Patriots	East	14	3	0	.824	5–1	9–3	.391	.370	W3
3	Jacksonville Jaguars	South	13	4	0	.765	5–1	10–2	.478	.425	W8
4	Pittsburgh Steelers	North	10	7	0	.588	4–2	8–4	.503	.453	W1
**Wild cards**
5 (Note: Houston finished ahead of Buffalo based on head-to-head victory.)	Houston Texans	South	12	5	0	.706	5–1	10–2	.522	.441	W9
6	Buffalo Bills	East	12	5	0	.706	4–2	9–3	.471	.412	W1
7	Los Angeles Chargers	West	11	6	0	.647	5–1	8–4	.469	.425	L2
**Did not qualify for the postseason**
8 (Note: Indianapolis finished ahead of Baltimore based on conference record (Indianapolis 6–6 to Baltimore 5–7).)	Indianapolis Colts	South	8	9	0	.471	2–4	6–6	.540	.382	L7
9	Baltimore Ravens	North	8	9	0	.471	3–3	5–7	.507	.408	L1
10	Miami Dolphins	East	7	10	0	.412	3–3	3–9	.488	.378	L1
11 (Note: Cincinnati finished ahead of Kansas City based on conference record (Cincinnati 5–7 to Kansas City 3–9).)	Cincinnati Bengals	North	6	11	0	.353	3–3	5–7	.521	.451	L1
12	Kansas City Chiefs	West	6	11	0	.353	1–5	3–9	.514	.363	L6
13	Cleveland Browns	North	5	12	0	.294	2–4	4–8	.486	.418	W2
14 (Note: Las Vegas finished ahead of NY Jets and Tennessee based on conference record (Las Vegas 3–9 to NY Jets 2–10 and Tennessee 2–10).)	Las Vegas Raiders	West	3	14	0	.176	1–5	3–9	.538	.451	W1
15 (Note: NY Jets finished ahead of Tennessee based on strength of victory (NY Jets .373 to Tennessee .275).)	New York Jets	East	3	14	0	.176	0–6	2–10	.552	.373	L5
16	Tennessee Titans	South	3	14	0	.176	0–6	2–10	.574	.275	L2
**Tiebreakers** (Note: When breaking ties for three or more teams under the NFL's rules, they are first broken within divisions, then comparing only the highest ranked remaining team from each division.)
