= Northridge =

Northridge could refer to:

== Places in the United States ==
=== Neighborhoods and CDPs ===
- Northridge, Los Angeles, a neighborhood of Los Angeles, California
  - California State University, Northridge
    - Cal State Northridge Matadors athletic teams from California State University, Northridge
  - The Northridge earthquake of 1994
- Northridge, Clark County, Ohio, a census-designated place
- Northridge, Montgomery County, Ohio, a census-designated place

=== Shopping malls ===
- Mershops Northridge, a shopping mall in Salinas, California
- Northridge Mall (Wisconsin), a former shopping mall in Milwaukee, Wisconsin

=== High schools ===
- Northridge High School in Middlebury, Indiana
- Northridge High School (Dayton, Ohio)
- Northridge High School (Layton, Utah)
- Northridge Preparatory School in Niles, Illinois

== People ==
- Nigel Northridge (born 1956), British businessman
