= Shiloh, Ohio =

Shiloh, Ohio may refer to the following places:

- Shiloh, Montgomery County, Ohio
- Shiloh, Richland County, Ohio
