= Harrison Township, Montgomery County, Ohio =

Township in Ohio, US

- Township
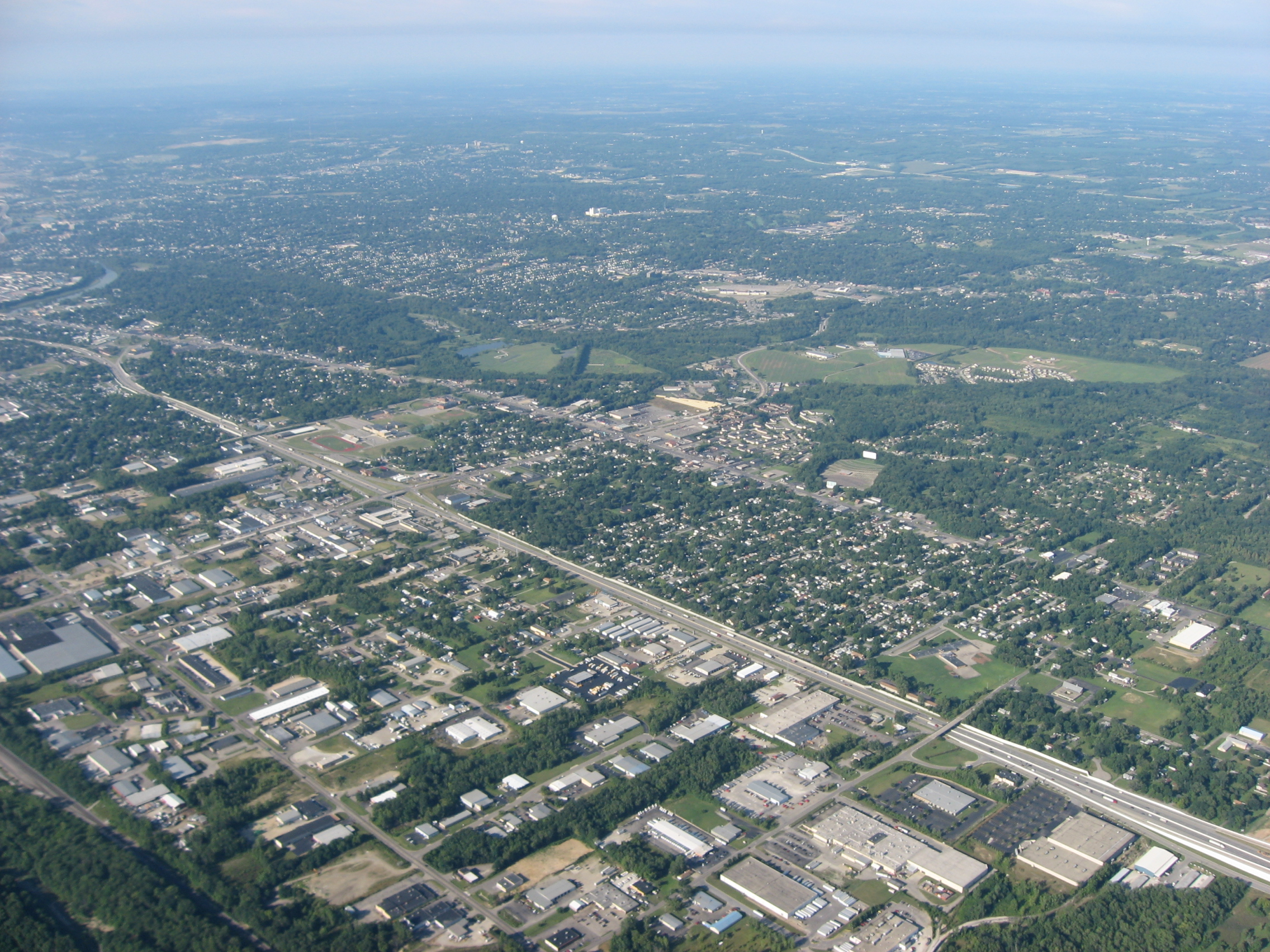
- Aerial view of Northridge

- Location in Montgomery County and the state of Ohio.
- Coordinates: 39°48′31″N 84°12′34″W
- Country: United States
- State: Ohio
- County: Montgomery

Area
  - Total: 9.0 sq mi (23.4 km^{2})
  - Land: 9.0 sq mi (23.2 km^{2})
  - Water: 0.077 sq mi (0.2 km^{2})
- Elevation: 801 ft (244 m)

Population (2020)
  - Total: 21,814
  - Density: 2,440/sq mi (940/km^{2})
- Time zone: UTC-5 (Eastern (EST))
  - Summer (DST): UTC-4 (EDT)
- Postal codes: 45414 & 45415
- Area code: 937
- FIPS code: 39-33922
- GNIS feature ID: 1086668
- Website: https://harrisontownship.org/

Harrison Township is one of the nine townships of Montgomery County, Ohio, United States. As of the 2020 census, the population was 21,814.

== Geography ==
Located in the central part of the county, it borders the following township and cities:

- Butler Township - north
- Vandalia - northeast
- Huber Heights - northeast corner
- Dayton - east and south
- Riverside - east
- Trotwood - west
- Clayton - northwest

Most of the original Harrison Township area has been incorporated into the city of Dayton, the county seat of Montgomery County. Three unincorporated areas occupy most of the unincorporated parts of the township:

- Fort McKinley, a census-designated place occupying the southwest of the western "island" around Salem Avenue.
- Shiloh, a census-designated place occupying all of the western "island" around N. Main St. except for Fort McKinley and a small section in the northeast
- Northridge, a former census-designated place occupying all of the central "island" along N. Dixie Drive from Stop Eight Road to the north, and Embury Park Road, and Great Miami River to the south.

Forest Park Plaza, an open-air shopping center on North Main Street in Harrison Township, was demolished in 2013.

== Name and history ==
It is one of nineteen Harrison Townships statewide.

== Government ==
The township is governed by a three-member board of trustees, who are elected in November of odd-numbered years to a four-year term beginning on the following January 1. Two are elected in the year after the presidential election and one is elected in the year before it. There is also an elected township fiscal officer, who serves a four-year term beginning on April 1 of the year after the election, which is held in November of the year before the presidential election. Vacancies in the fiscal officership or on the board of trustees are filled by the remaining trustees.

Police services are provided in the township through a contract with the Montgomery County Sheriff's Office.

== Education ==
Children from Harrison Township attend the schools of Northridge Local Schools, Dayton Public Schools and six public charter schools in the township.
