= Fort McKinley, Ohio =

- Census-designated place
- Location within Ohio Location within the United States
- Coordinates: 39°48′09″N 84°14′55″W
- Country: United States
- State: Ohio
- County: Montgomery
- Township: Harrison

Area
  - Total: 1.34 sq mi (3.46 km^{2})
  - Land: 1.34 sq mi (3.46 km^{2})
  - Water: 0 sq mi (0.00 km^{2})
- Elevation: 958 ft (292 m)

Population (2020)
  - Total: 3,473
  - Density: 2,601.9/sq mi (1,004.58/km^{2})
- Time zone: UTC-5 (Eastern (EST))
  - Summer (DST): UTC-4 (EDT)
- ZIP Codes: 45405, 45406, 45416 (Dayton)
- FIPS code: 39-27846
- GNIS feature ID: 2393003

Fort McKinley is an unincorporated community and census-designated place in Harrison Township in Montgomery County, Ohio, United States. As of the 2020 census, its population was 3,473.

Fort McKinley is part of the Dayton Metropolitan Statistical Area.

Fort McKinley was platted in 1914.

== Geography ==
The community is in northeastern Montgomery County, in the southwest corner of Harrison Township. It is bordered to the north and east by unincorporated Shiloh, to the west by the city of Trotwood, and to the south by the city of Dayton. Salem Avenue (former Ohio State Route 49) passes through the southern part of Fort McKinley, leading southeast 4 miles (6 km) to the center of Dayton and northwest 6 miles (10 km) to Interstate 70.

According to the U.S. Census Bureau, the Fort McKinley CDP has an area of 1.3 square miles (3.4 km^{2}), all land.

== Demographics ==
Historical population
Census	Pop.	Note	%±
1970	11,536		—
1980	10,161		−11.9%
1990	9,740		−4.1%
2000	3,989		−59.0%
2020	3,473		—
U.S. Decennial Census

=== Racial and ethnic composition ===
Fort McKinley CDP, Ohio – Racial and ethnic composition Note: the US Census treats Hispanic/Latino as an ethnic category. This table excludes Latinos from the racial categories and assigns them to a separate category. Hispanics/Latinos may be of any race.
Race / Ethnicity (NH = Non-Hispanic)	Pop 2000	Pop 2010	Pop 2020	% 2000	% 2010	% 2020
White alone (NH)	1,725	x	720	43.24%	x	20.73%
Black or African American alone (NH)	2,114	x	2,456	53.00%	x	70.72%
Native American or Alaska Native alone (NH)	7	x	6	0.18%	x	0.17%
Asian alone (NH)	14	x	6	0.35%	x	0.17%
Native Hawaiian or Pacific Islander alone (NH)	0	x	5	0.00%	x	0.14%
Other race alone (NH)	14	x	31	0.35%	x	0.89%
Mixed race or Multiracial (NH)	89	x	163	2.23%	x	4.69%
Hispanic or Latino (any race)	26	x	86	0.65%	x	2.48%
Total	3,989	x	3,473	100.00%	x	100.00%

=== 2020 census ===
As of the 2020 census, Fort McKinley had a population of 3,473. The median age was 38.9 years. 24.6% of residents were under the age of 18 and 16.3% of residents were 65 years of age or older. For every 100 females there were 84.7 males, and for every 100 females age 18 and over there were 78.3 males age 18 and over.

100.0% of residents lived in urban areas, while 0.0% lived in rural areas.

There were 1,438 households in Fort McKinley, of which 31.0% had children under the age of 18 living in them. Of all households, 28.7% were married-couple households, 19.5% were households with a male householder and no spouse or partner present, and 44.8% were households with a female householder and no spouse or partner present. About 32.6% of all households were made up of individuals and 12.9% had someone living alone who was 65 years of age or older.

There were 1,629 housing units, of which 11.7% were vacant. The homeowner vacancy rate was 0.3% and the rental vacancy rate was 10.9%.

=== 2010 census ===
Fort McKinley was not listed in the 2010 U.S. census.

=== 2000 census ===
As of the 2000 census, there were 3,989 people, 1,587 households, and 1,068 families residing in the CDP. The population density was 2,994.3 inhabitants per square mile (1,156.1/km^{2}). There were 1,713 housing units at an average density of 1,285.9 per square mile (496.5/km^{2}). The racial makeup of the CDP was 43.44% White, 53.17% African American, 0.18% Native American, 0.35% Asian, 0.55% from other races, and 2.31% from two or more races. Hispanic or Latino of any race were 0.65% of the population.

There were 1,587 households, out of which 31.3% had children under the age of 18 living with them, 39.3% were married couples living together, 23.6% had a female householder with no husband present, and 32.7% were non-families. 28.2% of all households were made up of individuals, and 9.8% had someone living alone who was 65 years of age or older. The average household size was 2.47 and the average family size was 3.00.

In the CDP the population was spread out, with 26.6% under the age of 18, 7.6% from 18 to 24, 30.1% from 25 to 44, 21.9% from 45 to 64, and 13.7% who were 65 years of age or older. The median age was 37 years. For every 100 females, there were 85.6 males. For every 100 females age 18 and over, there were 81.3 males.

The median income for a household in the CDP was $31,933, and the median income for a family was $41,490. Males had a median income of $28,224 versus $25,903 for females. The per capita income for the CDP was $16,155. About 10.3% of families and 15.4% of the population were below the poverty line, including 24.4% of those under age 18 and 12.0% of those age 65 or over.
