= Chukwuebuka Godrick =

Nigerian gridiron football player (born 2000)

No. 79 – Miami Dolphins
- Position: Offensive tackle
- Roster status: Active

Personal information
- Born: October 11, 2000 (age 26); Lagos, Nigeria
- Listed height: 6 ft 5 in (1.96 m)
- Listed weight: 293 lb (133 kg)

Career history
- Kansas City Chiefs (2023–2025); Miami Dolphins (2026–present)

Awards and highlights
- Super Bowl champion (LVIII)

Career statistics as of 2025
- Games played: 4
- Games started: 3
- Stats at Pro Football Reference

Chukwuebuka Jason "Chu" Godrick (born October 11, 2000) is a Nigerian professional American football offensive tackle for the Miami Dolphins of the National Football League (NFL). He was recruited through the NFL's International Player Pathway (IPP) program.

== Early life ==
Godrick was born in Lagos, Nigeria and began his sports venture playing basketball through the Christian Program called Educational Basketball established in Lagos. When his potential for football was discovered, Godrick entered the International Player Pathway (IPP) program and began training in 2022 at the L.Bentley O-line Performance facility founded by former NFL player LeCharles Bentley in Chandler, Arizona.

== Professional career ==
=== Kansas City Chiefs ===
Godrick began his professional career in the NFL as a member of the Kansas City Chiefs team in 2023. He was briefly assigned to the team's practice squad before his release at the end of August 2023. He was re-signed by the Chiefs on August 28, 2024. The following year, Godrick was named part of the practice squad following the completion of the 2025 season's active roster. After being elevated from the practice squad, Godrick made his NFL debut in Week 15 upon an injury to right tackle Jaylon Moore. He started the next 3 games, being signed to the active roster on December 20.

On August 30, 2026, Chukwuebuka was waived by the Chiefs as a part of final roster cuts.

=== Miami Dolphins ===
On August 31, 2026, Godrick was claimed off of waivers by the Miami Dolphins.

== Personal life ==
On May 16, 2024, Godrick and Chiefs teammate Wanya Morris were arrested in Johnson County on misdemeanor charges of marijuana possession. They were released the following morning on a $2,500 bond.
