= Northridge Local School District =

School district in Ohio, United States

Northridge Local Schools

Address
- 2008 Timber Lane Dayton, Ohio, 45414; United States
- Coordinates: 39.8127°N 84.1957°W

District information
- Type: Public
- Motto: Educating Today for Tomorrow’s Success
- Grades: PK–12
- Established: 1926
- President: Mark Brumley
- Vice-president: Margie Glock
- Superintendent: David Jackson
- Schools: 4
- NCES District ID: 3904873
- District ID: OH-048736

Students and staff
- Students: 1,647 (2024–2025)
- Teachers: 96.93 (on an FTE basis) (2024–2025)
- Staff: 254.90 (on an FTE basis) (2024–2025)
- Student–teacher ratio: 16.99 (2024–2025)
- Athletic conference: Southwestern Buckeye League
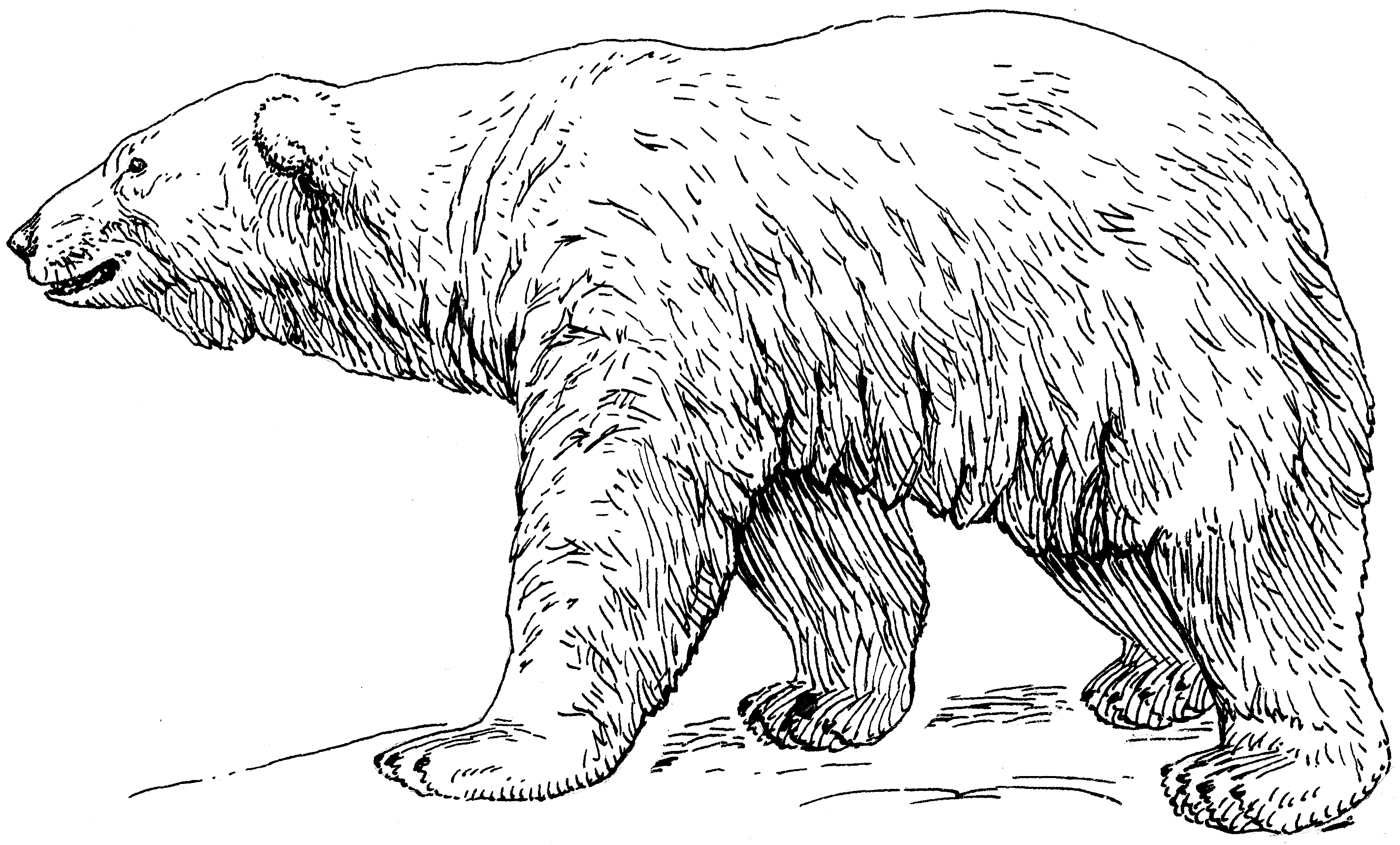
- District mascot
- Colors: Scarlet & Gray

Other information
- Website: www.northridgeschools.org

Northridge Local Schools is a school district in Northridge, Harrison Township, Montgomery County, Ohio, United States.

== Administration ==
The superintendent is Mr. David Jackson (2010–Present).

== Schools ==
- Northridge High School
- Pk-12 are all housed in a single campus building opened in 2019.

=== Campus ===
In 2015 Northridge passed a levy which gave them access to 42 million dollars to build a new PK-12 school. Although a low voting turnout the levy passed by a 60-40 ratio. The new school replaced the highschool and all feeder schools in the district. Ester Dennis Middle School was the first of the buildings to be replaces as it was the location of the new building. Demolition began in December 2016 and construction continued throughout 2017 and completed for the 2019 school year.

=== Defunct schools ===
- Northridge High School Building (1964-2020) 2251 Timber Ln.
- Grafton Kennedy Elementary School Building (1954-2019) 2655 Wagner Ford Rd. (Destroyed in the Dayton tornadoes of 27 May 2019)
- John H.Morrison Elementary School Building (1959-2020) 2235 Arthur Ave.
- Timberlane Learning Center (1952-2019) 2131 Timber Ln.
- Esther Dennis Middle School Building (1926-2016) 5120 N. Dixie Dr.(demolished 2016 to make room for the new Pk-12 school) (originally Northridge High School 1934–1964)
- Ebenezer 11-A School Building (1904-1932) 4100 N Dixie Dr. One of two school houses built to replace the Ebenezer & Beardshear Schools.
- Ebenezer 11-B School Building (1904-1932) 6515 North Dixie Dr. One of two school houses built to replace the Ebenezer & Beardshear Schools.
- Beardshear School Building (1880-1904) 3211 Needmore Rd. One of two school houses built to replace the Oak Grove School.
- Ebenezer School Building (1880-1904) 4905 N Dixie Dr. One of two school houses built to replace the Oak Grove School.
- Oak Grove School Building (1835-1880) 2543 Timber Ln. Built on the foundation of a former school house that burnt down.
