= Drew Ogletree =

American football player (born 1988)

Andrew Ogletree
No. 85 – Indianapolis Colts
- Position: Tight end
- Roster status: Active

Personal information
- Born: July 28, 1998 (age 28); Dayton, Ohio, U.S.
- Listed height: 6 ft 5 in (1.96 m)
- Listed weight: 260 lb (118 kg)

Career information
- High school: Northridge (Northridge, Dayton, Ohio)
- College: Findlay (2016–2019); Youngstown State (2020–2021)
- NFL draft: 2022: 6th round, 192nd overall pick

Career history
- Indianapolis Colts (2022–present)

Career NFL statistics as of 2025
- Receptions: 22
- Receiving yards: 283
- Receiving touchdowns: 4
- Stats at Pro Football Reference

Andrew Ogletree (born July 28, 1998) is an American professional football tight end for the Indianapolis Colts of the National Football League (NFL). He played college football for the Findlay Oilers and Youngstown State Penguins.

== Early life ==
Ogletree grew up in Dayton, Ohio and attended Northridge High School, where he played football and basketball.

== College career ==
Ogletree began his college career at the University of Findlay. Over the course of three seasons, he caught 54 passes for 785 yards and 10 touchdowns. He transferred to Youngstown State University after his junior year. Ogletree caught 28 passes for 282 yards as a senior.

== Professional career ==
Pre-draft measurables
Height	Weight	Arm length	Hand span	Wingspan	40-yard dash	10-yard split	20-yard split	20-yard shuttle	Three-cone drill	Vertical jump	Broad jump	Bench press
6 ft 5 1/4 in (1.96 m)	261 lb (118 kg)	32 5/8 in (0.83 m)	9 3/4 in (0.25 m)	6 ft 9 5/8 in (2.07 m)	4.71 s	1.62 s	2.64 s	4.52 s	7.31 s	35.0 in (0.89 m)	10 ft 1 in (3.07 m)	26 reps
All values from Pro Day

Ogletree was selected by the Indianapolis Colts in the sixth round, 192nd overall, of the 2022 NFL draft. On August 18, 2022, Ogletree was placed on injured reserve after suffering a torn ACL in training camp.

In Week 4 of the 2023 season, Ogletree scored his first NFL touchdown against the Los Angeles Rams. He finished the season with nine receptions for 147 yards and two touchdowns in 12 games, including nine starts.

Ogletree made 15 appearances (five starts) for Indianapolis during the 2025 season, recording four receptions for 27 yards and one touchdown. On December 27, 2025, Ogletree was placed on season-ending injured reserve due to a neck injury suffered in Week 16 against the San Francisco 49ers.

On March 13, 2026, Ogletree re-signed with the Colts on a one-year contract.

== Legal issues ==
On December 29, 2023, Ogletree was arrested in Hendricks County, Indiana for alleged domestic violence. He was charged with two felonies: domestic violence committed in the presence of a child less than 16 years old and domestic battery resulting in moderate bodily injury. A victim was taken to a hospital. The charges were dismissed with prejudice on March 5, 2024.
