= Chargers–Chiefs rivalry =

National Football League rivalry

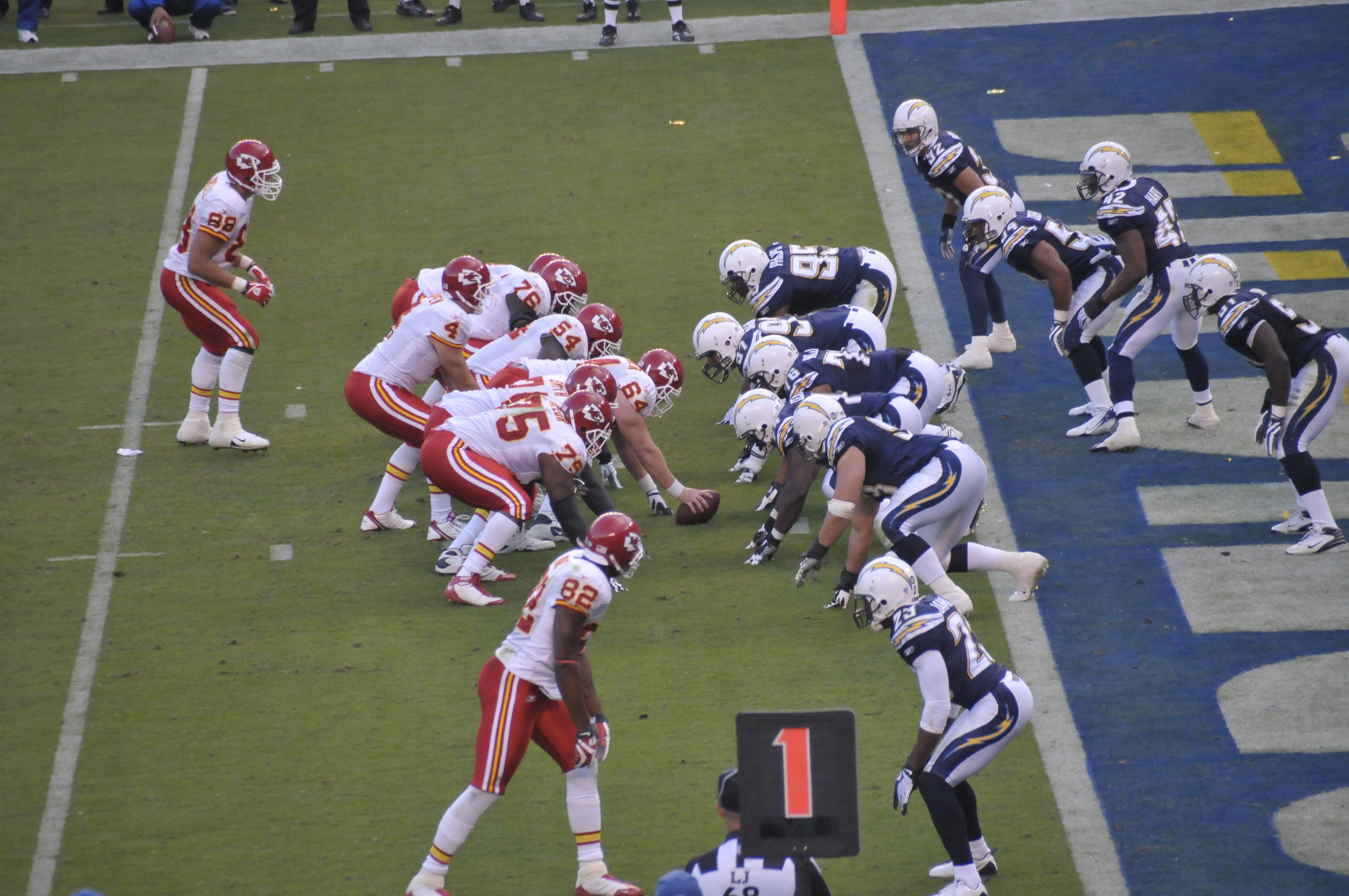
- Chargers and Chiefs face off during the 2009 season.

- Los Angeles Chargers Kansas City Chiefs
- Location: Los Angeles, Kansas City
- First meeting: September 10, 1960; Chargers 21, Texans 20
- Latest meeting: October 18, 2026; Chiefs 22, Chargers 6
- Next meeting: January 2/3, 2027
- Stadiums: Chargers: SoFi Stadium; Chiefs: Arrowhead Stadium

Statistics
- Total meetings: 133
- All-time series: Chiefs: 72–60–1
- Regular season series: Chiefs: 72–59–1
- Postseason results: Chargers: 1–0
- Largest victory: Chargers: 31–0 (2010); Chiefs: 49–6 (1964)
- Most points scored: Chargers: 45 (1967); Chiefs: 49 (1964)
- Longest win streak: Chargers: 6 (1979–1981); Chiefs: 9 (2014–2018)
- Current win streak: Chiefs: 1 (2026–present)

Post–season history
- 1992 AFC Wild Card: Chargers won: 17–0

The Chargers–Chiefs rivalry is a National Football League (NFL) rivalry between the Los Angeles Chargers and Kansas City Chiefs.

Since the American Football League (AFL) was established in 1960, the Chargers and the Chiefs have shared the same division, first being the AFL Western Conference, and since the AFL–NFL merger, the American Football Conference (AFC) West. Following the Raiders' move to Las Vegas (Chiefs) and the Rams' return to Los Angeles (Seahawks and 49ers), they are now the farthest apart two teams in the same division. In recent seasons, Kansas City has dominated the rivalry with 18 wins in the last 21 meetings, including eleven straight wins in San Diego/Los Angeles.

Furthermore, the Chiefs are one of four NFL teams with a winning record against every division rival after 100 games played against each of them (along with the Dallas Cowboys, Green Bay Packers, and Miami Dolphins). Conversely, the Chargers are one of only three NFL teams with a losing record against every division rival after the same number of games played against each of them (along with the Detroit Lions and New York Jets).

The Chiefs lead the overall series, 72–60–1. The two teams have met once in the playoffs, with the Chargers winning.

== Notable games ==
=== 1960s ===
Season: 1960 (Week 1)
Score: Dallas Texans 20–21 Los Angeles Chargers
Notability: The first regular season game for both franchises. Dallas led 20–7 after three quarters, but Jack Kemp ran for one touchdown and threw for another in a comeback win.

Season: 1964 (Week 14)
Score: Kansas City Chiefs 49–6 San Diego Chargers
Notability: Kansas City's 43-point win represents the widest margin of victory in the series. San Diego came into the game having already clinched the division, but turned the ball over six times. Len Dawson completed 17 of 28 passes for 220 yards, 4 touchdowns and no interceptions.

=== 1970s ===
Season: 1975 (Week 12)
Score: San Diego Chargers 28–20 Kansas City Chiefs
Notability: San Diego entered the game with an 0–11 record, but defeated the 5–6 Chiefs to avoid a winless season. They scored fourteen unanswered points in the final quarter; quarterback Dan Fouts was intercepted three times but scored the clinching touchdown on a 9-yard run.

Season: 1978 (Week 11)
Score: Kansas City Chiefs 23–29 (OT) San Diego Chargers
Notability: Won by a Charger touchdown as time expired in overtime. San Diego reached the Kansas City 14 near the end of the extra period, then almost ran out of time when Fouts mistook the play clock for the game clock. Fouts found John Jefferson in the back of the end zone for the game-winner as the last seconds ran off.

=== 1980s ===
Season: 1985 (Week 16)
Score: San Diego Chargers 34–38 Kansas City Chiefs
Notability: Stephone Paige broke the NFL single-season receiving yards record. Paige caught 8 passes for 309 yards and two touchdowns – a 56-yarder from Todd Blackledge and an 84-yarder from Bill Kenney. (Note: Paige's record was broken by Flipper Anderson four years later.) Kansas City led 35–3 in the 2nd quarter and 38–13 early in the final quarter, before three unanswered Charger touchdowns left them just short of a comeback win.

Season: 1986 (Week 7)
Score: San Diego Chargers 41–42 Kansas City Chiefs
Notability: The highest-scoring game in the series. The Chiefs scored three return touchdowns in the second quarter, twice on interceptions by Lloyd Burress and once from a fumble recovered by Kevin Ross; Leslie O'Neal added an interception return touchdown for San Diego in the same quarter. The Chargers went on to outgain Kansas City by 512 offensive yards to 222, but still lost when kicker Rolf Benirschke missed a 35-yard field goal in the final minute.

=== 1990s ===
Season: 1992 (Wildcard playoffs)
Score: Kansas City Chiefs 0–17 San Diego Chargers
Notability: To date, the only playoff meeting between the teams. In rainy conditions, neither team scored in the opening half. Marion Butts opened the scoring in the 3rd quarter with a 54-yard touchdown run, and the Charger defense completed the shutout. Kansas City had swept the Chargers during the regular season, but finished with a 10–6 record to the Chargers' 11–5, hence the playoff game took place in San Diego.

Season: 1995 (Week 6)
Score: San Diego Chargers 23–29 (OT) Kansas City Chiefs
Notability: Tamarick Vanover scored the first overtime punt return touchdown in NFL history. In a close-fought Monday Night Football game, San Diego led 23–16 after a John Carney field goal with barely a minute left, before Steve Bono led a quick touchdown drive to force overtime. Vanover won the game in the extra period when he took a Darren Bennett punt back 86 yards for a touchdown.

Season: 1998 (Week 3)
Score: San Diego Chargers 7–23 Kansas City Chiefs
Notability: Rookie Ryan Leaf produced a passer rating of zero in his third start for the Chargers, having won the first two. Leaf finished with 1 completion from 15 attempts, for 4 yards, no touchdowns and three interceptions. He also lost three fumbles and was sacked twice for the loss of 23 yards.

=== 2000s ===
Season: 2000 (Week 13)
Score: Kansas City Chiefs 16–17 San Diego Chargers
Notability: As they had done in 1975, the 0–11 Chargers beat the 5–6 Chiefs to end the prospect of a winless season. Leaf threw two touchdowns to Freddie Jones in the first half to put San Diego up 14–3, but had an interception run back for a touchdown in the second half as Kansas City came back to lead 16–14. Carney converted a 54-yard field goal with two minutes left, and San Diego won when Warren Moon threw incomplete on 4th down.

Season: 2001 (Week 8)
Score: Kansas City Chiefs 25–20 San Diego Chargers
Notability: Quarterback Drew Brees, a future Super Bowl MVP, made his NFL debut for the Chargers after Doug Flutie was injured. Brees entered the game 16–0 behind; the deficit became 19–0 before he led the Chargers to 20 unanswered points. Kansas City responded with a game-winning Tony Richardson touchdown run in the final two minutes. Brees completed 15 of 27 passes for 221 yards, with a touchdown and no interceptions.

Season: 2006 (Week 15)
Score: Kansas City Chiefs 9–20 San Diego Chargers
Notability: LaDainian Tomlinson broke the NFL single-season records for rushing touchdowns (28) and points scored (186). He also extended his single-season record for total touchdowns to 31, while rushing 25 times for 199 yards, and scoring on runs of 15 and 85 yards.

Season: 2008 (Week 15)
Score: San Diego Chargers 22–21 Kansas City Chiefs
Notability: The Chargers (5–8 entering the game) would have been eliminated from playoff contention with a loss, and Kansas City (2–11) led 21–3 in the 3rd quarter. The score was still 21–10 entering the final two minutes, but Philip Rivers threw two touchdowns either side of a successful onside kick, for a one-point lead. Chiefs kicker Connor Barth missed a 50-yard field goal as time expired, and San Diego eventually won the AFC West.

=== 2010s ===
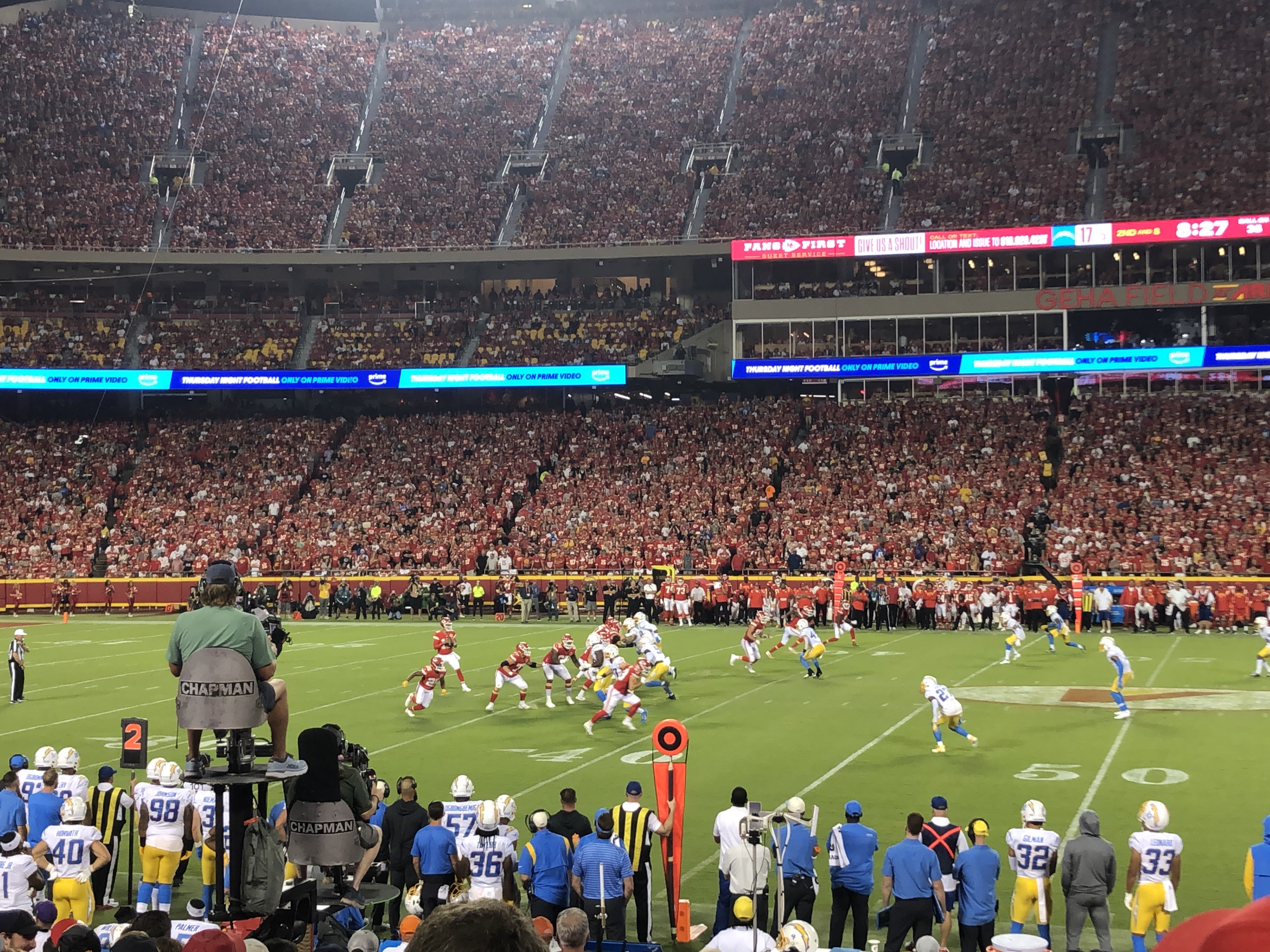
Chargers at Chiefs, in 2022.

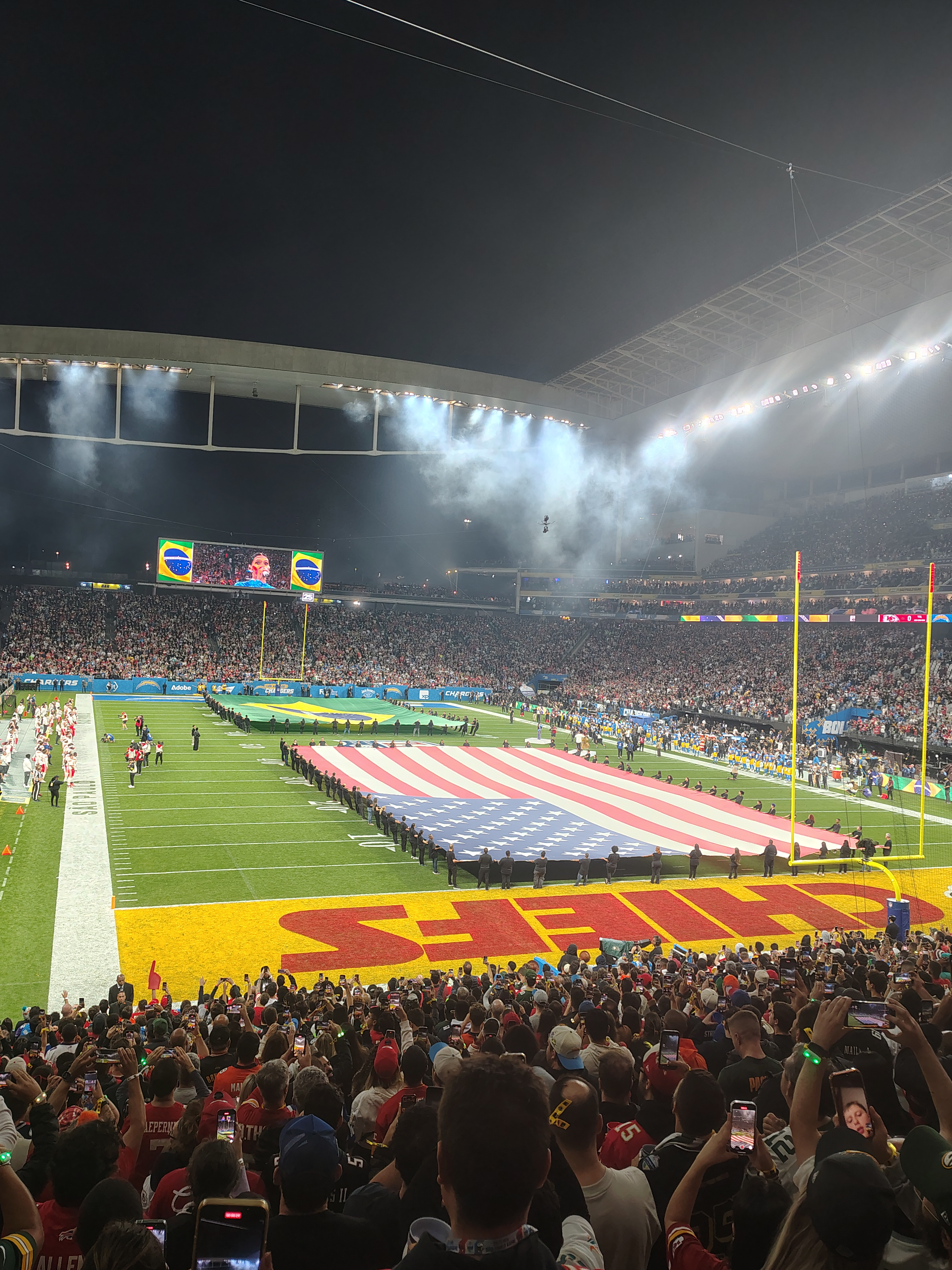
Chargers and Chiefs, in São Paulo, Brazil 2025.

Season: 2013 (Week 17)
Score: Kansas City Chiefs 24–27 (OT) San Diego Chargers
Notability: San Diego needed a win or tie to make the playoffs. The Chiefs, who had already clinched a playoff berth, rested many of their starters, but still led 24–14 entering the final quarter. After the Chargers tied the game, Chiefs kicker Ryan Succop had a chance to eliminate them, but missed a 41-yard field goal with 4 seconds left and San Diego won in overtime.

Season: 2014 (Week 17)
Score: San Diego Chargers 7–19 Kansas City Chiefs
Notability: At 9–6, San Diego needed a win to make the playoffs against the 8–7 Chiefs, who had a small chance of qualifying. The Kansas City defense sacked Rivers seven times and intercepted him twice, and Chiefs tight end Travis Kelce recovered a teammate's fumble in the end zone to help them lead by twelve points. San Diego drove into Kansas City territory on their final four drives but failed to score on any of them. Both sides missed the playoffs.

Season: 2016 (Week 1)
Score: San Diego Chargers 27–33 (OT) Kansas City Chiefs
Notability: The Chiefs came back from 21 points down to win in overtime. Melvin Gordon scored twice as San Diego took a 24–3 lead with six minutes to play in the 3rd quarter, but Alex Smith converted two 4th downs and threw two touchdowns as Kansas City came back to tie. Smith ran for the winning score himself on the first drive of overtime. He finished with 34 completions from 48 attempts, for 363 yards, two touchdowns and an interception.

=== 2020s ===
Season: 2022 (Week 2)
Score: Los Angeles Chargers 24–27 Kansas City Chiefs
Notability: Los Angeles and Kansas City played in the first Thursday Night Football game broadcast nationally and exclusively on Amazon Prime Video.

Season: 2025 (Week 1)
Score: Los Angeles Chargers 27–21 Kansas City Chiefs
Notability: Los Angeles and Kansas City played at Arena Corinthians in São Paulo, Brazil in the second NFL game to be played in South America, and the first to be broadcast globally free, as it was streamed on YouTube. Many YouTubers, including IShowSpeed, promoted the game and livestreamed themselves watching it while adding commentary. The win marked the first victory for the Chargers against the Chiefs since 2021, and began the Chiefs' first losing season since 2012.

== Season-by-season results ==
San Diego/Los Angeles Chargers vs. Dallas Texans/Kansas City Chiefs Season-by-Season Results
1960s (Chiefs, 10–9–1)

Season	Season series	at Los Angeles/San Diego Chargers	at Dallas Texans/Kansas City Chiefs	Overall series	Notes
1960	Tie 1–1	Chargers; 21–20	Texans; 17–0	Tie; 1–1	Inaugural season for both franchises and the American Football League (AFL). The Chargers and Texans are placed in the AFL Western Division, resulting in two meetings annually. Game in Los Angeles is the inaugural game for both franchises, which saw the Chargers overcome a 20–7 fourth quarter deficit. Texans record their first home win in franchise history. Last season until the 2017 season the Chargers played as a Los Angeles-based franchise..Chargers lose 1960 AFL Championship.
1961	Chargers 2–0	Chargers; 24–14	Chargers; 26–10	Chargers; 3–1	Chargers relocate to San Diego. Chargers lose 1961 AFL Championship.
1962	Tie 1–1	Chargers; 32–28	Texans; 26–17	Chargers; 4–2	Game in Dallas was the Texans' final regular-season game as a Dallas-based team and under the Texans name. Texans win 1962 AFL Championship.
1963	Chargers 2–0	Chargers; 24–10	Chargers; 38–17	Chargers; 6–2	Texans relocate to Kansas City and rename themselves to the Kansas City Chiefs. Chargers win 1963 AFL Championship.
1964	Tie 1–1	Chiefs; 49–6	Chargers; 28–14	Chargers; 7–3	In San Diego, Chiefs record their largest victory against the Chargers with a 43–point differential and score their most points in a game against the Chargers. Chargers lose 1964 AFL Championship.
1965	Chiefs 1–0–1	Tie; 10–10	Chiefs; 31–7	Chargers; 7–4–1	Chargers lose 1965 AFL Championship.
1966	Chiefs 2–0	Chiefs; 27–17	Chiefs; 24–14	Chargers; 7–6–1	Chiefs win 1966 AFL Championship, but lose Super Bowl I.
1967	Chargers 2–0	Chargers; 45–31	Chargers; 17–16	Chargers; 9–6–1	Chargers open San Diego Stadium. In San Diego, Chargers scored their most points in a game against the Chiefs.
1968	Chiefs 2–0	Chiefs; 40–3	Chiefs; 27–20	Chargers; 9–8–1	
1969	Chiefs 2–0	Chiefs; 27–9	Chiefs; 27–3	Chiefs; 10–9–1	Chiefs win 1969 AFL Championship and Super Bowl IV.

1970s (Tie, 10–10)

Season	Season series	at San Diego Chargers	at Kansas City Chiefs	Overall series	Notes
1970	Tie 1–1	Chargers; 31–13	Chiefs; 26–14	Chiefs; 11–10–1	As a result of the AFL–NFL merger, the Chargers and Chiefs are placed in the AFC West.
1971	Tie 1–1	Chargers; 21–14	Chiefs; 31–10	Chiefs; 12–11–1	
1972	Tie 1–1	Chiefs; 26–14	Chargers; 27–17	Chiefs; 13–12–1	
1973	Chiefs 2–0	Chiefs; 19–0	Chiefs; 33–6	Chiefs; 15–12–1	
1974	Tie 1–1	Chiefs; 24–14	Chargers; 14–7	Chiefs; 16–13–1	
1975	Tie 1–1	Chiefs; 12–10	Chargers; 28–20	Chiefs; 17–14–1	Chargers' win snapped an 11-game losing streak and earned their first win of the 1975 season after an 0–11 start.
1976	Tie 1–1	Chiefs; 23–20	Chargers; 30–16	Chiefs; 18–15–1	
1977	Tie 1–1	Chiefs; 21–16	Chargers; 23–7	Chiefs; 19–16–1	Road team wins eight straight meetings (1974–1977).
1978	Tie 1–1	Chargers; 29–23 (OT)	Chiefs; 23–0	Chiefs; 20–17–1	
1979	Chargers 2–0	Chargers; 28–7	Chargers; 20–14	Chiefs; 20–19–1	Chargers' first season series sweep against the Chiefs since the 1967 season.

1980s (Chargers, 12–7)

Season	Season series	at San Diego Chargers	at Kansas City Chiefs	Overall series	Notes
1980	Chargers 2–0	Chargers; 20–7	Chargers; 24–7	Chargers; 21–20–1	
1981	Chargers 2–0	Chargers; 22–20	Chargers; 42–31	Chargers; 23–20–1	
1982	Chiefs 1–0	canceled	Chiefs; 19–12	Chargers; 23–21–1	Due to the 1982 NFL Players' strike, the game scheduled in San Diego was canceled. This remains the only season the Chargers and Chiefs did not face each other twice in a season.
1983	Chargers 2–0	Chargers; 41–38	Chargers; 17–14	Chargers; 25–21–1	
1984	Chiefs 2–0	Chiefs; 42–21	Chiefs; 31–13	Chargers; 25–23–1	Chiefs' first season series sweep against the Chargers since the 1973 season.
1985	Tie 1–1	Chargers; 31–20	Chiefs; 38–34	Chargers; 26–24–1	In Kansas City, Chiefs' WR Stephone Paige finished with 309 receiving yards, setting an NFL record for most receiving yards by one player in a game (broken by Calvin Johnson in 2013).
1986	Chiefs 2–0	Chiefs; 24–23	Chiefs; 42–41	Tie; 26–26–1	In San Diego, Chiefs overcame a 16–0 second half deficit.
1987	Tie 1–1	Chargers; 42–21	Chiefs; 20–13	Tie; 27–27–1	
1988	Chargers 2–0	Chargers; 24–13	Chargers; 24–23	Chargers; 29–27–1	
1989	Chargers 2–0	Chargers; 21–6	Chargers; 20–13	Chargers; 31–27–1	

1990s (Chiefs, 14–7)

Season	Season series	at San Diego Chargers	at Kansas City Chiefs	Overall series	Notes
1990	Chiefs 2–0	Chiefs; 24–21	Chiefs; 27–10	Chargers; 31–29–1	
1991	Chiefs 2–0	Chiefs; 14–13	Chiefs; 20–17 (OT)	Tie; 31–31–1	
1992	Chiefs 2–0	Chiefs; 24–10	Chiefs; 16–14	Chiefs; 33–31–1	
1992 Playoffs	Chargers 1–0	Chargers 17–0	—N/a	Chiefs; 33–32–1	AFC Wild Card playoff game.
1993	Chiefs 2–0	Chiefs; 17–14	Chiefs; 28–24	Chiefs; 35–32–1	In Kansas City, Chiefs overcame a 17–0 deficit.
1994	Chargers 2–0	Chargers; 20–6	Chargers; 14–13	Chiefs; 35–34–1	Chargers lose Super Bowl XXIX.
1995	Chiefs 2–0	Chiefs; 22–7	Chiefs; 29–23 (OT)	Chiefs; 37–34–1	
1996	Chargers 2–0	Chargers; 22–19	Chargers; 28–14	Chiefs; 37–36–1	
1997	Chiefs 2–0	Chiefs; 29–7	Chiefs; 31–3	Chiefs; 39–36–1	
1998	Tie 1–1	Chargers; 38–37	Chiefs; 23–7	Chiefs; 40–37–1	In San Diego, Chargers overcame a 34–17 fourth quarter deficit. First season series split since the 1987 season.
1999	Tie 1–1	Chargers; 21–14	Chiefs; 34–0	Chiefs; 41–38–1	

2000s (Chargers, 11–9)

Season	Season series	at San Diego Chargers	at Kansas City Chiefs	Overall series	Notes
2000	Tie 1–1	Chargers; 17–16	Chiefs; 42–10	Chiefs; 42–39–1	Chargers' snapped an 11-game losing streak, and their win was their only victory in the 2000 season.
2001	Chiefs 2–0	Chiefs; 25–20	Chiefs; 20–17	Chiefs; 44–39–1	
2002	Tie 1–1	Chargers; 35–34	Chiefs; 24–22	Chiefs; 45–40–1	Chargers hire former Chiefs' head coach Marty Schottenheimer as their head coach.
2003	Chiefs 2–0	Chiefs; 28–24	Chiefs; 27–14	Chiefs; 47–40–1	
2004	Chargers 2–0	Chargers; 24–17	Chargers; 34–31	Chiefs; 47–42–1	
2005	Tie 1–1	Chargers; 28–20	Chiefs; 20–7	Chiefs; 48–43–1	
2006	Tie 1–1	Chargers; 20–9	Chiefs; 30–27	Chiefs; 49–44–1	Chiefs victory came on a last-second field goal by K Lawrence Tynes, who had missed two kicks earlier in the game. It was also the Chargers' final regular season loss, as they went on to finish the season on a 10-game winning streak.
2007	Tie 1–1	Chiefs; 30–16	Chargers; 24–10	Chiefs; 50–45–1	
2008	Chargers 2–0	Chargers; 20–19	Chargers; 22–21	Chiefs; 50–47–1	In Kansas City, Chargers overcame a 21–3 third quarter deficit.
2009	Chargers 2–0	Chargers; 43–14	Chargers; 37–7	Chiefs; 50–49–1	

2010s (Chiefs, 13–7)

Season	Season series	at San Diego/Los Angeles Chargers	at Kansas City Chiefs	Overall series	Notes
2010	Tie 1–1	Chargers; 31–0	Chiefs; 21–14	Chiefs; 51–50–1	In San Diego, Chargers record their largest victory against the Chiefs with a 31–point differential.
2011	Tie 1–1	Chargers; 20–17	Chiefs; 23–20 (OT)	Chiefs; 52–51–1	In Kansas City, Chargers QB Philip Rivers fumbled the ball while kneeling to set up the potential game-winning field goal, leading to a Chiefs game-winning field goal in overtime. Had they won this game, they would have won the AFC West; however, they ended up tied with the Broncos and Raiders, ultimately losing the tiebreakers to the Broncos.
2012	Chargers 2–0	Chargers; 31–13	Chargers; 37–20	Chargers; 53–52–1	
2013	Chargers 2–0	Chargers; 27–24 (OT)	Chargers; 41–38	Chargers; 55–52–1	In San Diego, Chargers clinch a playoff berth with their win.
2014	Chiefs 2–0	Chiefs; 23–20	Chiefs; 19–7	Chargers; 55–54–1	Chiefs' first season series sweep against the Chargers since the 2003 season.
2015	Chiefs 2–0	Chiefs; 33–3	Chiefs; 10–3	Chiefs; 56–55–1	
2016	Chiefs 2–0	Chiefs; 37–27	Chiefs; 33–27 (OT)	Chiefs; 58–55–1	In Kansas City, Chiefs overcame a 24–3 second half deficit. The 21-point comeback set a new Chiefs franchise record for largest comeback (broken in 2019). Game in San Diego is the Chargers' final game as a San Diego-based franchise.
2017	Chiefs 2–0	Chiefs; 24–10	Chiefs; 30–13	Chiefs; 60–55–1	Chargers relocate back to Los Angeles.
2018	Tie 1–1	Chiefs; 38–28	Chargers; 29–28	Chiefs; 61–56–1	Chiefs win nine straight meetings (2014–2018); In Kansas City, Chargers overcame a 28–14 fourth quarter deficit and won on a last-minute touchdown and two-point conversion. Both teams finished with 12–4 records, but the Chiefs clinched the AFC West based on a better division record.
2019	Chiefs 2–0	Chiefs; 24–17*	Chiefs; 31–21	Chiefs; 63–56–1	Chargers' home game was played at Estadio Azteca in Mexico City as part of the NFL International Series. Chiefs win Super Bowl LIV.

2020s (Chiefs, 9–4)

Season	Season series	at Los Angeles Chargers	at Kansas City Chiefs	Overall series	Notes
2020	Tie 1–1	Chiefs; 23–20 (OT)	Chargers; 38–21	Chiefs; 64–57–1	Chargers open SoFi Stadium, with their game against the Chiefs being their first home game at the new stadium. Chiefs lose Super Bowl LV.
2021	Tie 1–1	Chiefs; 34–28 (OT)	Chargers; 30–24	Chiefs; 65–58–1	
2022	Chiefs 2–0	Chiefs; 30–27	Chiefs; 27–24	Chiefs; 67–58–1	Chiefs win Super Bowl LVII.
2023	Chiefs 2–0	Chiefs; 13–12	Chiefs; 31–17	Chiefs; 69–58–1	Chiefs win Super Bowl LVIII.
2024	Chiefs 2–0	Chiefs; 17–10	Chiefs; 19–17	Chiefs; 71–58–1	Chiefs win 11 straight road meetings (2014–2024). In Kansas City, Chiefs clinched the AFC West with their win. Chiefs lose Super Bowl LIX.
2025	Chargers 2–0	Chargers; 27–21	Chargers; 16–13	Chiefs; 71–60–1	Chargers' home game was played at Arena Corinthians in São Paulo as part of the NFL International Series. In Kansas City, the Chargers recorded their first season-series sweep of the Chiefs since 2013, eliminated Kansas City from playoff contention for the first time since the 2014 season, and became the first AFC West team since the 2014 Broncos to sweep the Chiefs. Additionally, Chiefs quarterback Patrick Mahomes suffered a torn ACL in his left knee during the game.
2026	Chiefs 1–0	January 2/3	Chiefs; 22–6	Chiefs; 72–60–1	

Summary of Results

Season	Season series	at San Diego/Los Angeles Chargers	at Dallas Texans/Kansas City Chiefs	Notes
AFL regular season	Chiefs 10–9–1	Chargers 5–4–1	Chiefs 6–4	Texans/Chiefs have a 2–1 record in Dallas.
NFL regular season	Chiefs 62–50	Chiefs 28–27	Chiefs 34–23	
AFL and NFL regular season	Chiefs 72–59–1	Tie 32–32–1	Chiefs 40–27	Chiefs are 1–0 at Estadio Azteca in Mexico City (2019), accounted as a Chargers' home game. Chargers are 1–0 at Arena Corinthians in São Paulo (2025), accounted as a Chargers' home game.
NFL postseason	Chargers 1–0	Chargers 1–0	no games	AFC Wild Card: 1992
Regular and postseason	Chiefs 72–60–1	Chargers 33–32–1	Chiefs 40–27	Chargers have a 31–24–1 record in San Diego. Texans/Chiefs currently have a 7–1 record in Los Angeles.

== Series leaders ==
Statistics limited to Chargers-Chiefs regular season games. Correct through 2023 season.

	Chargers	Chiefs	Ref
Passing yards	Philip Rivers – 7,504	Len Dawson – 4,476	
Rushing yards	LaDainian Tomlinson – 1,488	Larry Johnson – 724	
Receiving yards	Antonio Gates – 1,501	Tony Gonzalez – 1,353	
Touchdowns	Antonio Gates – 17	Stephone Paige – 10	
Sacks	Leslie O'Neal – 11 1/2	Tamba Hali – 13 1/2; Derrick Thomas – 13 1/2	
Interceptions	Speedy Duncan – 5	Johnny Robinson – 8	

== See also ==
- List of NFL rivalries
- AFC West
