= Northridge High School (Dayton, Ohio) =

Location
- 2211 Timber Ln. Dayton, Ohio, 45414; United States; 39.815409°N 84.191966°W

Information
- School type: High school
- Motto: Educating Today for Tomorrow’s Success
- Established: 1933
- School district: Northridge Local School District
- Superintendent: David Jackson
- Grades: 9-12
- Enrollment: 493 (2023-2024)
- Colors: Scarlet & Gray
- Fight song: Fight The Team
- Athletics: Football, Volleyball, Golf, Cross Country, Tennis, Soccer, Basketball, Wrestling, Baseball, Track
- Athletics conference: Three Rivers Conference
- Mascot: Polar Bear
- Team name: Northridge Polar Bears
- Newspaper: Dividends
- Communities served: Northridge
- Alumni: Alumni Links
- Website: Northridge Website

Northridge High School is part of Northridge Local Schools. The school is located in Dayton, Ohio, United States. The school mascot is the polar bear. Northridge's mission is "Educating Today for Tomorrow's Success".

Northridge met nine of the 12 state indicators for the 2008–2009 school year, earning an "Effective" rating.

== Ohio High School Athletic Association State Championships ==
- Boys Basketball – 1945
- Track - Boys-4 X 800 Relay (1988-1989) - Scott Rairden, Mike Green, Brian Smith, Mike Banta
- Track - Boys-800 Meter Run (1994-1995) - C.J. Szekely
- Wrestling - 160 lb (1996-1997) - Shawn Brightman

== Alumni ==
This is a partial list of notable alumni of Northridge High School (Dayton, Ohio).

- Joseph G. Lapointe Jr – received Medal of Honor
- Frank J. Myers – Grammy winner, singer-songwriter of Baker & Myers
- Robert Pollard – lead singer of Guided by Voices
- Chris Spurling – Former MLB player (Detroit Tigers, Milwaukee Brewers)
- Walter Hirsch – former college basketball player, central figure in point shaving scandal
- Drew Ogletree – tight end for the Indianapolis Colts, 2022 NFL draft pick from Youngstown State.
- Matt MacPherson – Associate head coach (safeties) of Northwestern Wildcats football
- Nolan R Jones – Associate athletics director for football operations of Appalachian State University
- Jay Hooten – Director of football performance of Northwestern Wildcats football
