= Shiloh, Montgomery County, Ohio =

Shiloh, Ohio
- Census-designated place
- Location within Ohio Location within the United States
- Coordinates: 39°48′31″N 84°13′31″W
- Country: United States
- State: Ohio
- County: Montgomery
- Township: Harrison

Area
  - Total: 3.94 sq mi (10.20 km^{2})
  - Land: 3.92 sq mi (10.14 km^{2})
  - Water: 0.023 sq mi (0.06 km^{2})
- Elevation: 814 ft (248 m)

Population (2020)
  - Total: 10,952
  - Density: 2,796.9/sq mi (1,079.87/km^{2})
- Time zone: UTC-5 (Eastern (EST))
  - Summer (DST): UTC-4 (EDT)
- ZIP Codes: 45405, 45406, 45415, 45416 (Dayton)
- FIPS code: 39-72284
- GNIS feature ID: 1049177

Shiloh is a census-designated place (CDP) in Harrison Township in Montgomery County, Ohio, United States. As of the 2020 census it had a population of 10,952. It is located directly north of the city of Dayton and is part of the Dayton Metropolitan Statistical Area.

The community took its name from the Shiloh Church which was established "in an early day".

The area was hit by a catastrophic EF4 tornado on May 27, 2019.

== Geography ==
Shiloh is in northeastern Montgomery County, in the northwest part of Harrison Township. It is bordered to the east and south by the city of Dayton, to the southwest by unincorporated Fort McKinley, to the west by the city of Trotwood, and to the north by the city of Clayton. Ohio State Route 48 (Main Street) passes through the center of Shiloh, leading southeast 4.5 miles (7.2 km) to the center of Dayton and northwest 5.5 miles (8.9 km) to Englewood.

According to the U.S. Census Bureau, the Shiloh CDP has a total area of 3.9 square miles (10 km^{2}), of which 0.02 square miles (0.05 km^{2}), or 0.61%, are water. The Stillwater River, a tributary of the Great Miami River, forms the eastern border of the CDP.

== Demographics ==
Historical population
Census	Pop.	Note	%±
1970	11,368		—
1980	11,735		3.2%
1990	11,607		−1.1%
2000	11,272		−2.9%
2020	10,952		—
U.S. Decennial Census

As of the census of 2000, there were 11,272 people, 5,700 households, and 2,736 families residing in the CDP. The population density was 2,936.8 inhabitants per square mile (1,133.9/km^{2}). There were 6,209 housing units at an average density of 1,617.7 per square mile (624.6/km^{2}). The racial makeup of the CDP was 61.65% White, 34.93% African American, 0.20% Native American, 0.69% Asian, 0.04% Pacific Islander, 0.50% from other races, and 2.00% from two or more races. Hispanic or Latino of any race were 1.15% of the population.

There were 5,700 households, out of which 18.8% had children under the age of 18 living with them, 33.5% were married couples living together, 11.4% had a female householder with no husband present, and 52.0% were non-families. 45.5% of all households were made up of individuals, and 15.2% had someone living alone who was 65 years of age or older. The average household size was 1.91 and the average family size was 2.68.

In the CDP the population was spread out, with 17.3% under the age of 18, 7.9% from 18 to 24, 28.0% from 25 to 44, 25.8% from 45 to 64, and 21.1% who were 65 years of age or older. The median age was 43 years. For every 100 females, there were 84.2 males. For every 100 females age 18 and over, there were 79.5 males.

The median income for a household in the CDP was $35,489, and the median income for a family was $48,109. Males had a median income of $34,785 versus $30,205 for females. The per capita income for the CDP was $22,532. About 5.0% of families and 10.0% of the population were below the poverty line, including 11.7% of those under age 18 and 9.5% of those age 65 or over.
