= Melvin Smith (American football) =

American football player (born 2002)

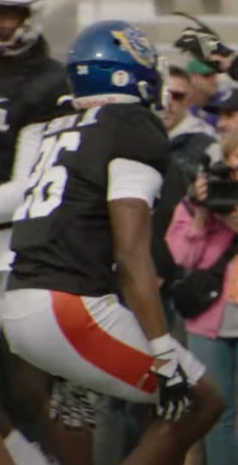
- Smith at the 2025 Senior Bowl

No. 39 – Kansas City Chiefs
- Position: Cornerback
- Roster status: Active

Personal information
- Born: April 12, 2002 (age 24); Bossier City, Louisiana, U.S.
- Listed height: 6 ft 1 in (1.85 m)
- Listed weight: 185 lb (84 kg)

Career information
- High school: Airline (Bossier City, Louisiana)
- College: Southern Arkansas (2021–2024)
- NFL draft: 2025: undrafted

Career history
- Kansas City Chiefs (2025); Tennessee Titans (2026); Kansas City Chiefs (2026–present)

Awards and highlights
- 2x GAC First Team (2023–2024); First Team Division II All-American (2023); Second Team Division II All-American (2024)

Career NFL statistics as of Week 9, 2026
- Total tackles: 3
- Stats at Pro Football Reference

Melvin Smith Jr. (born April 12, 2002) is an American professional football cornerback for the Kansas City Chiefs of the National Football League (NFL). He played college football for the Southern Arkansas Muleriders.

== Early life ==
Smith was born in Bossier City, Louisiana and played high school football as a cornerback and free safety for the Airline Vikings.

== College career ==
Smith enrolled at Southern Arkansas University and joined the Southern Arkansas Muleriders as a defensive back for the 2021 season. Smith was a four-year starter and was twice-named GAC First Team for the 2023 and 2024 seasons. He was named First Team Division II All-American for the 2023 season and named Second Team Division II All-American for the 2024 season. He finished his career in 2024 with record totals of 168 tackles including 110 solo tackles, 6.5 tackles-for-loss, 9 interceptions, 46 pass break-ups and 1 forced fumble. He accepted an invitation to play in the 2025 Southern Arkansas Senior Bowl.

== Professional career ==
Pre-draft measurables
Height	Weight	Arm length	Hand span	Wingspan	40-yard dash	10-yard split	20-yard split	20-yard shuttle	Three-cone drill	Vertical jump	Broad jump	Bench press
5 ft 10 1/2 in (1.79 m)	190 lb (86 kg)	30 7/8 in (0.78 m)	9 in (0.23 m)	6 ft 1 1/4 in (1.86 m)	4.39 s	1.49 s	2.52 s	4.19 s	7.13 s	38.5 in (0.98 m)	10 ft 0 in (3.05 m)	13 reps
All values from Pro Day

=== Kansas City Chiefs ===
On March 24, 2025, Smith accepted a try-out invitation with the Kansas City Chiefs. On April 27, Smith signed with the team as an undrafted free agent following the 2025 NFL draft. Smith was named part of the practice squad after the active roster was finalized on August 27. He was promoted to the active roster on December 24.

On August 30, 2026, Smith was waived by the Chiefs as a part of final roster cuts.

=== Tennessee Titans ===
On August 31, 2026, Smith was claimed off of waivers by the Tennessee Titans. He was waived by Tennessee on September 10.

=== Kansas City Chiefs (second stint) ===
On September 16, 2026, Smith was signed to the Kansas City Chiefs' practice squad. He was promoted to the active roster on October 31.
