= Kam Arnold =

American football player (born 2002)

Profile
- Position: Linebacker

Personal information
- Born: February 19, 2002 (age 24); West Bloomfield, Michigan, U.S.
- Listed height: 6 ft 1 in (1.85 m)
- Listed weight: 229 lb (104 kg)

Career information
- High school: Orchard Lake St. Mary's (Orchard Lake Village, Michigan)
- College: Boston College (2020–2024)
- NFL draft: 2025: undrafted

Career history
- Washington Commanders (2025)*; Kansas City Chiefs (2025)*
- * Offseason or practice squad member only
- Stats at Pro Football Reference

Kam Arnold (born February 19, 2002) is an American professional football linebacker. He was previously a member of the Washington Commanders as an undrafted free agent following the 2025 NFL draft. He played college football for the Boston College Eagles.

== Early life ==
Arnold was born in 2002 in West Bloomfield, Michigan to Ana and Ken Arnold. He attended high school at the Catholic college preparatory school Orchard Lake St. Mary's where he played cornerback and wide receiver with the St. Mary's Eaglets football team. He also played one season of baseball. He finished his high school career totalling 11 touchdowns, 161 tackles, 17 pass break-ups and five forced fumbles. His performance earned him a three-star recruiting prospect rating from 247Sports as well as 19 collegiate sports scholarship offers. He graduated in 2020.

== College career ==
Arnold committed to Boston College and joined the Eagles football team as a safety for the 2020 season totalling seven tackles across two games. In the following season as a sophomore, Arnold transitioned from safety to linebacker. He started 11 of 12 games played and finished his season with totals including 61 tackles, two pass break-ups and one sack. In 2022 as a starting linebacker in all 12 games, Arnold finished the season with 75 tackles, placing third on the team. He placed third on the team after the 2023 season with 66 total tackles. During 2025 in his fifth and final year with the Eagles, Arnold was a team captain and started in the first seven games before sustaining a season-ending injury. His season totals included 40 tackles that placed him sixth on the team. After graduating from Boston College, Arnold began studying towards earning a Master of Business Administration (MBA).

== Professional career ==
Pre-draft measurables
| Height | Weight | Arm length | Hand span | Wingspan | 40-yard dash | 10-yard split | 20-yard split | 20-yard shuttle | Three-cone drill | Vertical jump | Broad jump |
|---|---|---|---|---|---|---|---|---|---|---|---|
| 6 ft 0 5/8 in (1.84 m) | 227 lb (103 kg) | 31 7/8 in (0.81 m) | 9 1/4 in (0.23 m) | 6 ft 4 5/8 in (1.95 m) | 4.59 s | 1.53 s | 2.66 s | 4.21 s | 7.07 s | 38.0 in (0.97 m) | 10 ft 3 in (3.12 m) |
All values from Pro Day

=== Washington Commanders ===
Arnold signed with the Washington Commanders as an undrafted free agent following the 2025 NFL draft. He was one of four Boston College players to join an NFL team after the draft including Kye Robichaux, Jack Conley, and Cam Horsley.

=== Kansas City Chiefs ===
Arnold signed with the Kansas City Chiefs on December 30, 2025 and was initially assigned to the practice squad. On January 5, 2026, Arnold was one of four players signed to a reserve/future contract by the Chiefs.

On August 30, 2026, Arnold was waived by the Chiefs as a part of final roster cuts.
