= Jaylon Moore (offensive lineman) =

American football player (born 1998)

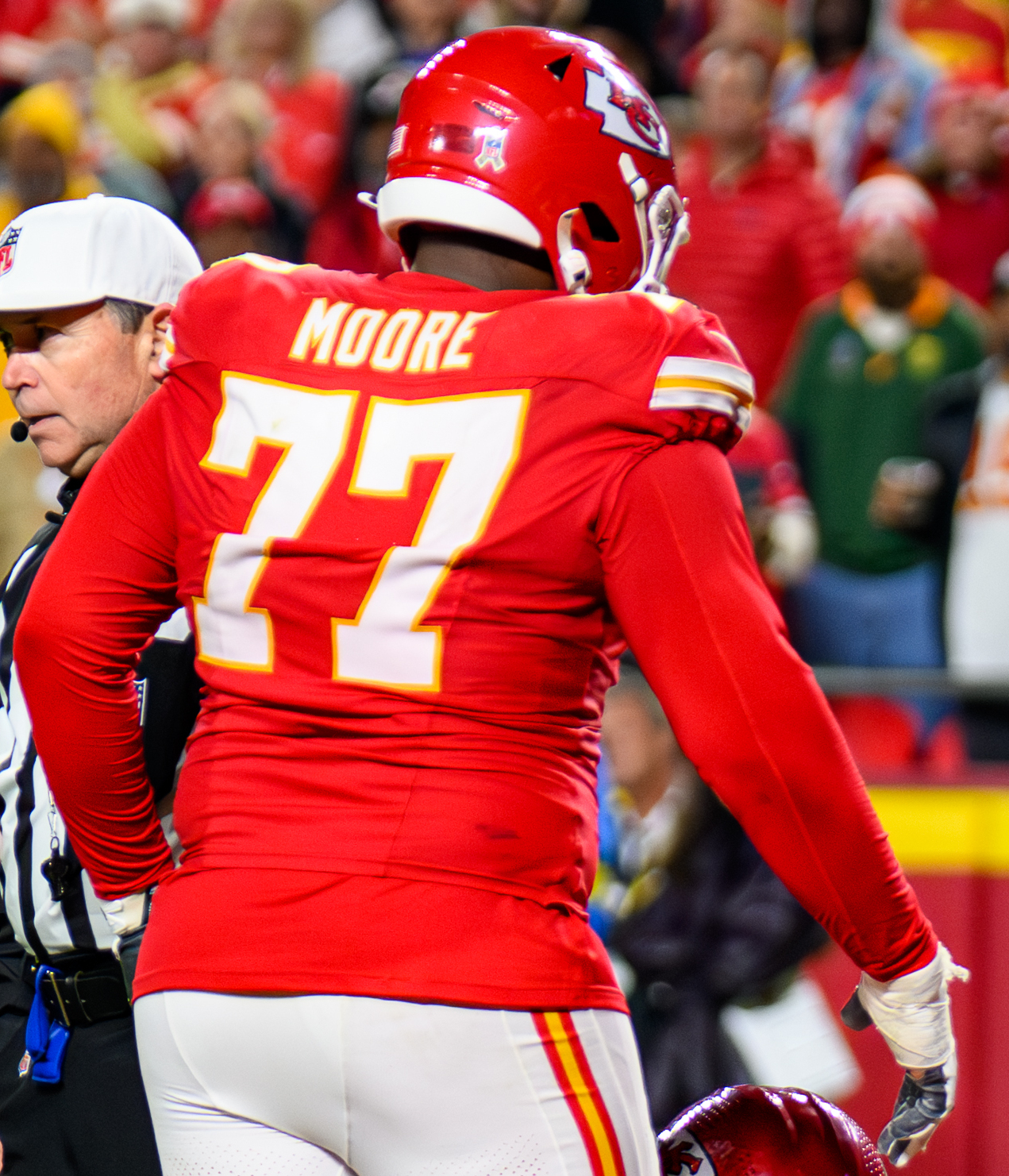
- Moore with the Kansas City Chiefs in 2025

No. 77 – Kansas City Chiefs
- Position: Offensive tackle
- Roster status: Active

Personal information
- Born: January 9, 1998 (age 28); Detroit, Michigan, U.S.
- Listed height: 6 ft 4 in (1.93 m)
- Listed weight: 311 lb (141 kg)

Career information
- High school: Consortium (Detroit)
- College: Western Michigan (2016–2020)
- NFL draft: 2021: 5th round, 155th overall pick

Career history
- San Francisco 49ers (2021–2024); Kansas City Chiefs (2025–present)

Awards and highlights
- Second-team All-MAC (2020)

Career NFL statistics as of 2025
- Games played: 70
- Games started: 18
- Stats at Pro Football Reference

Jaylon Moore (born January 9, 1998) is an American professional football offensive tackle for the Kansas City Chiefs of the National Football League (NFL). He was selected by the San Francisco 49ers with the 155th pick of the 2021 NFL draft. He played college football for the Western Michigan Broncos.

== College career ==
Moore was ranked as a two–star recruit by 247Sports.com coming out of high school. He committed to Western Michigan on June 7, 2015. He was a tight end in high school, but converted to offensive lineman in college.

== Professional career ==
Pre-draft measurables
Height	Weight	Arm length	Hand span	Wingspan	40-yard dash	10-yard split	20-yard split	20-yard shuttle	Three-cone drill	Vertical jump	Broad jump	Bench press
6 ft 4 1/8 in (1.93 m)	311 lb (141 kg)	33 3/8 in (0.85 m)	10 3/4 in (0.27 m)	6 ft 10 1/2 in (2.10 m)	5.25 s	1.82 s	3.03 s	4.63 s	7.77 s	30.5 in (0.77 m)	8 ft 10 in (2.69 m)	27 reps
All values from Pro Day

=== San Francisco 49ers ===
Moore was selected by the San Francisco 49ers with the 155th pick in the fourth round of the 2021 NFL draft. He signed his four-year rookie contract on May 13, 2021. As a rookie, he appeared in seven games and started three. In the 2022 season, he appeared in all 17 regular season games and the 49ers' three postseason games. He made two starts in weeks 5 and 6. In the 2023 season, he appeared in 16 regular season games and made two starts, weeks 7 and 8. In 2024, Moore started five games in relief of injured left tackle Trent Williams. On December 25, 2024, Moore was placed on injured reserve.

=== Kansas City Chiefs ===
On March 13, 2025, Moore signed a two-year, $30 million contract with the Kansas City Chiefs. During the preseason, he primarily trained at right tackle while Jawaan Taylor recovered from knee surgery, and was named a backup upon his return. He started weeks 6 to 9 at left tackle while Josh Simmons was away from the team. After an injury to Taylor in week 12, Moore played right tackle and then started weeks 13 and 14 before suffering a knee injury.
