= Northridge, Montgomery County, Ohio =

Northridge, Ohio
- Former census-designated place
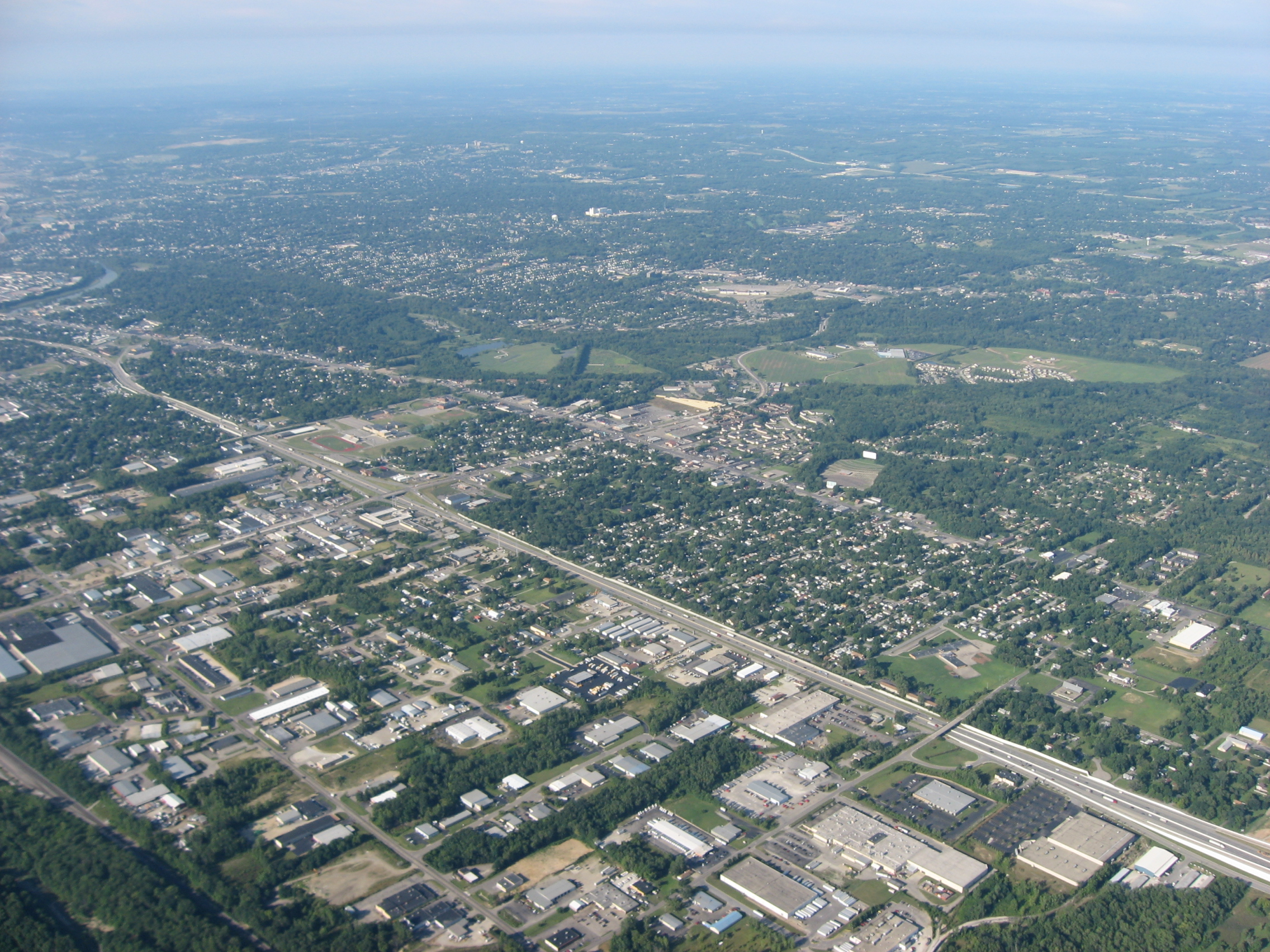
- Aerial view of Northridge

- Location within Ohio Location within the United States
- Coordinates: 39°48′43″N 84°11′29″W
- Country: United States
- State: Ohio
- County: Montgomery
- Township: Harrison

Area
  - Total: 2.3 sq mi (6.0 km^{2})
  - Land: 2.3 sq mi (6.0 km^{2})
  - Water: 0.0 sq mi (0 km^{2})
- Elevation: 824 ft (251 m)

Population (2000)
  - Total: 8,487
  - Density: 3,700/sq mi (1,400/km^{2})
- Time zone: UTC-5 (Eastern (EST))
  - Summer (DST): UTC-4 (EDT)
- ZIP Codes: 45413-45414 (Dayton)
- Area codes: 937, 326
- FIPS code: 39-56952
- GNIS feature ID: 2393160

Northridge is an unincorporated community in Harrison Township in Montgomery County, Ohio, United States. It was delineated as a census-designated place (CDP) for the 2000 census, at which time its population was 8,487, but has not been delineated as such since then. It is located directly north of the city of Dayton and is part of the Dayton Metropolitan Statistical Area.

Northridge suffered serious damage in the tornadoes that struck the Dayton, Ohio area on May 27, 2019.

== Geography ==
According to the United States Census Bureau, the CDP had a total area of 2.3 square miles (6.0 km^{2}), all land.

== Demographics ==
As of the census of 2000, there were 8,487 people, 3,398 households, and 2,409 families residing in the CDP. The population density was 3,733.9 inhabitants per square mile (1,441.7/km^{2}). There were 3,689 housing units at an average density of 1,623.0 per square mile (626.6/km^{2}). The racial makeup of the CDP was 85.99% White, 11.91% African American, 0.26% Native American, 0.08% Asian, 0.04% Pacific Islander, 0.42% from other races, and 1.30% from two or more races. Hispanic or Latino of any race were 0.78% of the population.

There were 3,398 households, out of which 36.5% had children under the age of 18 living with them, 41.9% were married couples living together, 23.0% had a female householder with no husband present, and 29.1% were non-families. 24.2% of all households were made up of individuals, and 8.5% had someone living alone who was 65 years of age or older. The average household size was 2.50 and the average family size was 2.93.

In the CDP the population was spread out, with 28.1% under the age of 18, 11.5% from 18 to 24, 27.6% from 25 to 44, 21.4% from 45 to 64, and 11.4% who were 65 years of age or older. The median age was 33 years. For every 100 females, there were 88.8 males. For every 100 females age 18 and over, there were 85.0 males.

The median income for a household in the CDP was $28,188, and the median income for a family was $30,730. Males had a median income of $27,500 versus $21,648 for females. The per capita income for the CDP was $14,239. About 21.3% of families and 21.9% of the population were below the poverty line, including 30.9% of those under age 18 and 6.5% of those age 65 or over.

== Education ==
Local students attend the schools of the Northridge Local School District, including Northridge High School.
