= 2022 Kansas City Chiefs season =

American football team season

- A graphic commemorating the Chiefs' win in Super Bowl LVII
- Owner: The Hunt Family (Clark Hunt Chairman and CEO)
- General manager: Brett Veach
- Head coach: Andy Reid
- Offensive coordinator: Eric Bieniemy
- Defensive coordinator: Steve Spagnuolo
- Home stadium: Arrowhead Stadium

Results
- Record: 14–3
- Division place: 1st AFC West
- Playoffs: Won Divisional Playoffs (vs. Jaguars) 27–20; Won AFC Championship (vs. Bengals) 23–20; Won Super Bowl LVII (vs. Eagles) 38–35
- All-Pros: 6: QB Patrick Mahomes (1st team); TE Travis Kelce (1st team); C Creed Humphrey (2nd team); G Joe Thuney (2nd team); DT Chris Jones (1st team); P Tommy Townsend (1st team)
- Pro Bowlers: 7: Selected but did not play due to participation in Super Bowl LVII: QB Patrick Mahomes; TE Travis Kelce; C Creed Humphrey; OT Orlando Brown Jr.; G Joe Thuney; DT Chris Jones; P Tommy Townsend
- Team MVP: Patrick Mahomes
- Team ROY: Isiah Pacheco

Uniform
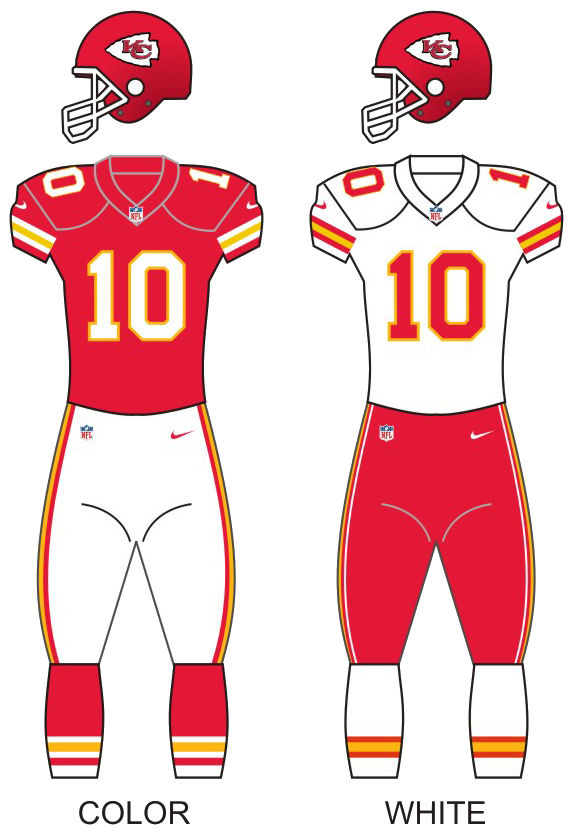

The 2022 season was the Kansas City Chiefs' 53rd in the National Football League (NFL), their 63rd overall, their 10th under head coach Andy Reid, and their sixth under general manager Brett Veach. The Chiefs finished the regular season 14–3, improving their win total from the previous season and matching the franchise record for wins.

In the offseason, the Chiefs traded wide receiver Tyreek Hill to the Miami Dolphins. Hill had been with the Chiefs since 2016. The Chiefs wore a decal with the number 16 on their helmets for the entire season in honor of former Chiefs quarterback and Super Bowl IV MVP Len Dawson, who died on August 24, and wore 16 his entire tenure with the Chiefs. Before the Chiefs first offensive play of the preseason game the following day, the Chiefs lined in a huddle popularized by Dawson where the quarterback stands in front of all other 10 offensive players instead of the quarterback standing in the middle with the players making a circle around him.

After their ninth victory in Week 12 over the Los Angeles Rams, the Chiefs clinched their tenth consecutive winning season, a franchise record. With a Week 15 win over the Houston Texans, they won the AFC West for the seventh consecutive year and fifteenth overall. It also was the Chiefs' franchise-record-extending eighth straight year making the playoffs. With a Week 18 win against the Raiders, and the Bills–Bengals game in Week 17 declared no contest, the Chiefs clinched the top seed in the AFC, but they did not clinch home field advantage throughout the AFC playoffs after the Bills beat the New England Patriots in their final game. The Chiefs hosted their fifth consecutive AFC Championship Game after the Bengals beat the Bills 27–10, where they defeated the Cincinnati Bengals 23–20. In Super Bowl LVII, the Chiefs defeated the Philadelphia Eagles 38–35. It was the Chiefs' third Super Bowl appearance and second win in four years.

This was Kansas City's fifth Super Bowl, following wins in Super Bowls IV and LIV and losses in Super Bowls I and LV. Prior to the Super Bowl era, the Chiefs won the American Football League championship in 1962.

The Super Bowl was the final for Norma Hunt, the widow of the Chiefs' founder, Lamar Hunt, who died in June 2023. She was a member (and the only woman) of the Never Miss a Super Bowl Club. She was a minority owner of the Chiefs at the time of her death.

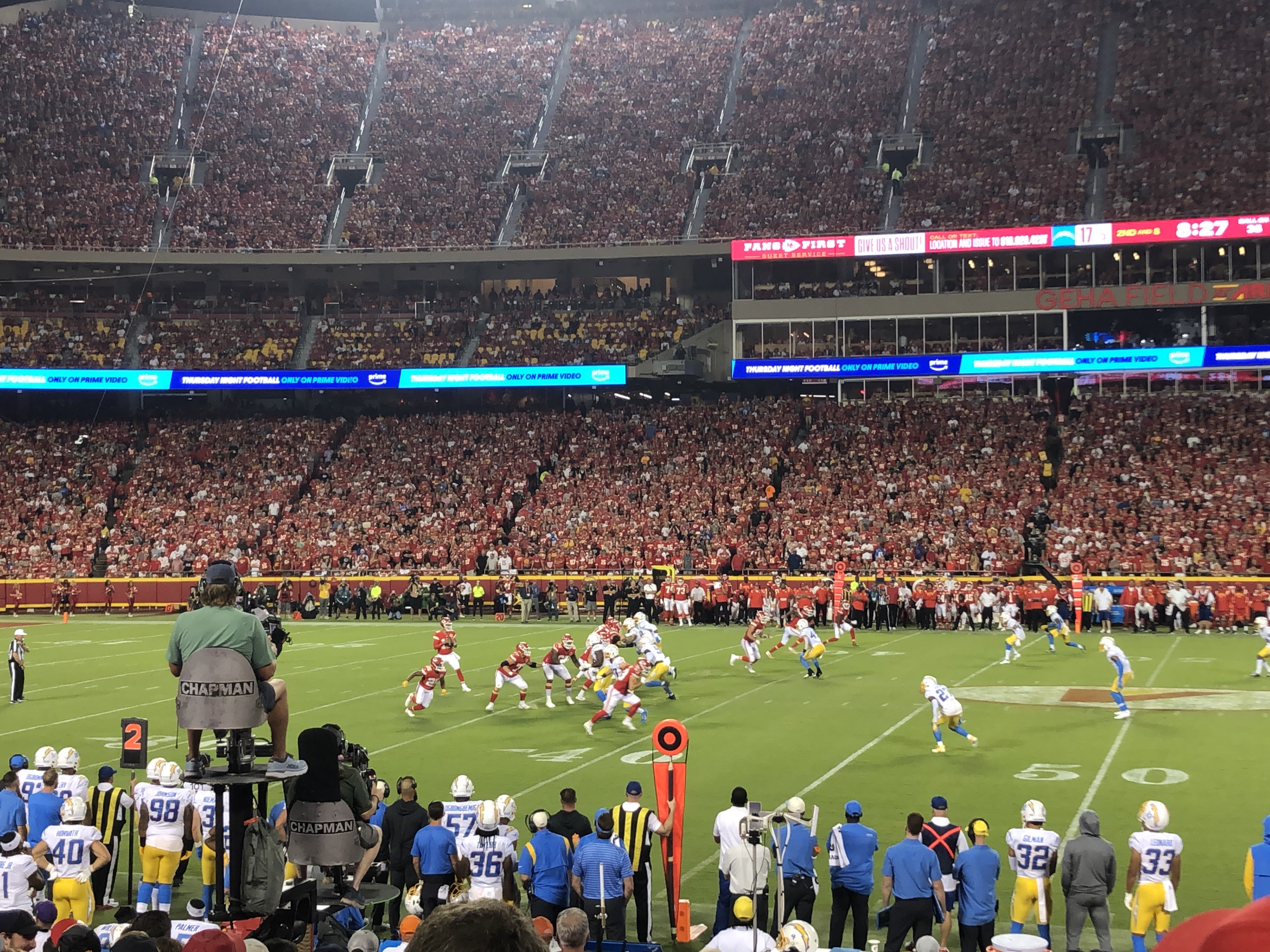
The Chargers and Chiefs playing in the first Thursday Night Football game broadcast exclusively on Amazon Prime Video.

== NFL Top 100 ==
The Chiefs only had three players ranked in the 2022 Top 100 players, their lowest number of selections since 2018. Quarterback Patrick Mahomes was once again the highest ranked player for the Chiefs on the countdown despite dropping 7 places in the rankings.

Rank	Player	Position	Change
8	Patrick Mahomes	Quarterback	▼7
10	Travis Kelce	Tight end	▼5
39	Chris Jones	Defensive tackle	▼5

== Offseason ==
All transactions in this section occurred between the end of the 2021 season (excluding futures contracts which began to be signed following the conclusion of the regular season) and the Chiefs first preseason game.

=== Coaching staff changes ===
2022 Kansas City Chiefs Coaching staff changes
Old coach	Reason	Position	New coach
Matt House	Hired by LSU	Linebackers	Brendan Daly
Brendan Daly	Title change	Defensive line coach	Joe Cullen
Mike Kafka	Hired by New York Giants	Quarterbacks coach	Matt Nagy
Sam Madison	Hired by Miami Dolphins	Secondary/cornerbacks	N/A*
Donald D'Alesio	Title change	Defensive assistant	N/A*
N/A†	Position created	Safeties coach	Donald D'Alesio

*The Chiefs do not have a coach with this exact title for the 2022 season.
†The Chiefs did not have a coach with this exact title for the 2021 season

=== Players lost ===
Below are players who were on the roster at the end of the 2021 season, but were either released or did not re-sign after their contract expired.

2022 Kansas City Chiefs Players lost
Player	Position	Reason
Deandre Baker	CB	Released
Austin Blythe	G	UFA
Anthony Hitchens	LB	Released
Mike Hughes	CB	UFA
Melvin Ingram	DE	UFA
Marcus Kemp	WR	UFA
Kyle Long	G	UFA
Tyrann Mathieu	S	UFA
Ben Niemann	LB	UFA
Dorian O'Daniel	LB	UFA
Alex Okafor	DE	UFA
Byron Pringle	WR	UFA
Jarran Reed	DT	UFA
Mike Remmers	T	UFA
Demarcus Robinson	WR	UFA
Daniel Sorensen	S	UFA
Charvarius Ward	CB	UFA
Armani Watts	S	UFA
Darrel Williams	RB	UFA

=== Futures contracts ===
Players signed to futures contracts typically spent most, if not all, if the 2021 season on the Chiefs or another team's practice squad. These contracts are signed after the conclusion of the regular season through the beginning the next league year.

2022 Kansas City Chiefs Futures contracts
Player	Position
Omar Bayless	WR
Dicaprio Bootle	CB
Cortez Broughton	DT
Matt Bushman	TE
Shilique Calhoun	LB
Brandin Dandridge	CB
Gehrig Dieter	WR
Austin Edwards	DE
Chris Finke	WR
Daurice Fountain	WR
Jordan Franks	TE
Josh Gordon	WR
Darius Harris	LB
Gary Jennings Jr.	WR
Roderick Johnson	T
Devon Key	SS
Brenden Knox	RB
Lorenzo Neal	DT
Josh Pederson	TE
Cornell Powell	WR
Mathew Sexton	WR
Darius Stills	DT
Mark Vital	TE
Darryl Williams	C

=== Players added ===
Players below played for another team in 2021 and signed with the Chiefs.

2022 Kansas City Chiefs Additions
Player	Position
Luq Barcoo	CB
Deon Bush	S
Jermaine Carter	LB
Geron Christian	T
Corey Coleman	WR
Matt Dickerson	DE
Carlos Dunlap	DE
Anthony Gordon	QB
Devin Gray	WR
Ronald Jones II	RB
Azur Kamara	LB
Evin Ksiezarczyk	T
Elijah Lee	LB
Justin Reid	S
Austin Reiter	C
JuJu Smith-Schuster	WR
Taylor Stallworth	DT
David Steinmetz	T
Marquez Valdes-Scantling	WR

=== Trades ===
Listed below are trades were a player was included in the trade.

2022 Kansas City Chiefs Trades
Team	Received	Compensation
Miami Dolphins	1st round selection 2022 draft 2nd round selection 2022 draft 4th round selection 2022 draft 4th round selection 2023 draft 6th round selection 2023 draft	WR Tyreek Hill
Houston Texans	CB Lonnie Johnson Jr.	7th round selection 2023 draft

=== Draft ===
2022 Kansas City Chiefs Draft
Round	Selection	Player	Position	College	Notes
1	21	Trent McDuffie	Cornerback	Washington	from New England (Note: The Chiefs traded first-, third- and fourth-round selections (29th, 94th and 121st overall) to the New England Patriots in exchange for a first-round selection (21st overall).)
1	29	Traded to New England			from San Francisco via Miami (Note: The Chiefs traded WR Tyreek Hill to the Miami Dolphins in exchange for first-, second- and fourth-round selections (29th, 50th and 121st overall), as well as 2023 fourth and sixth-round selections.)
1	30	George Karlaftis	Defensive end	Purdue	
2	50	Traded to New England (Note: The Chiefs traded a second-round selection (50th overall) to the New England Patriots in exchange for second- and fifth-round selections (54th and 158th overall).)			from Miami
2	54	Skyy Moore	Wide receiver	Western Michigan	from New England
2	62	Bryan Cook	Safety	Cincinnati	
3	94	Traded to New England			
3	103	Leo Chenal	Linebacker	Wisconsin	2020 Resolution JC-2A selection
4	121	Traded to New England			from Miami
4	135	Joshua Williams	Cornerback	Fayetteville State	
5	145	Darian Kinnard	Offensive tackle	Kentucky	from Detroit via Denver and Seattle (Note: The Chiefs traded fifth- and seventh-round selections (158th and 233rd overall) to the Seattle Seahawks in exchange for a fifth-round selection (145th overall).)
5	158	Traded to Seattle			from Miami via New England
5	173	Traded to Baltimore (Note: The Chiefs traded a fifth-round selection (173rd overall), and 2021 first-, third- and fourth-round selections to the Baltimore Ravens in exchange for OT Orlando Brown Jr., a sixth-round selection (191st overall) and a 2021 second-round selection.)			
6	191	Traded to Minnesota (Note: The Chiefs traded a sixth-round selection (191st overall) to the Minnesota Vikings in exchange for CB Mike Hughes and a seventh-round selection (233rd overall).)			from Baltimore
6	208	Traded to Pittsburgh (Note: The Chiefs traded a sixth-round selection (208th overall) to the Pittsburgh Steelers in exchange for DE Melvin Ingram.)			
7	233	Traded to Seattle			from Minnesota
7	243	Jaylen Watson	Cornerback	Washington State	from Las Vegas via New England (Note: The Chiefs traded OT Yasir Durant to the New England Patriots in exchange for a seventh-round selection (243rd overall).)
7	251	Isiah Pacheco	Running back	Rutgers	
7	259	Nazeeh Johnson	Safety	Marshall	Compensatory pick

Draft trades

=== Undrafted free agents ===
2022 Kansas City Chiefs undrafted free agents
Name	Position	College
Mike Caliendo	Guard	Western Michigan
Jack Cochrane	Linebacker	South Dakota
Dustin Crum	Quarterback	Kent State
Jerrion Ealy	Running back	Ole Miss
Tayon Fleet-Davis	Running back	Maryland
Chris Glaser	Offensive lineman	Virginia
Nasir Greer	Safety	Wake Forest
Kehinde Oginni Hassan	Tight end	None
Gene Pryor	Tackle	Hawaii
Mike Rose	Linebacker	Iowa State
Justyn Ross	Wide receiver	Clemson

=== Signed and released in the offseason ===
Players listed below were signed and released in the offseason before playing for the team.

2022 Kansas City Chiefs signed & released
Name	Position
Luq Barcoo	CB
Shilique Calhoun	LB
Gehrig Dieter*	WR
Chris Finke	WR
Anthony Gordon	QB
Nakia Griffin-Stewart	TE
Brenden Knox	RB
Lorenzo Neal	DT
Josh Pederson	TE
Gene Pryor	T
Matthew Sexton	WR
Darius Stills	DT
Mark Vital	TE
Jonathan Woodard	DE

*Shortly after his release, Dieter announced his retirement

== Preseason transactions ==
All transactions below occurred in between the Chiefs first preseason game on August 13 and their first regular season game on September 11.

=== Signings ===
2022 Kansas City Chiefs Signings
Name	Position
Danny Shelton	DT

=== Cuts ===
The Chiefs made their first set of roster cut downs on August 16. They made another three cuts on August 23, they also placed two on reserve lists. Their final roster cut, which will be 27 cuts, will occur by August 30. The Chiefs also placed players on reserve lists to meet the roster requirements.

Down to 85

2022 Kansas City Chiefs Cut to 85
Name	Position
Omar Bayless	WR
Austin Edwards	DE
Devin Gray	WR
Gary Jennings Jr.	WR
Lonnie Johnson Jr.	CB
Evin Ksiezarczyk	T

Down to 80

2022 Kansas City Chiefs Cut to 80
Name	Position
Brandin Dandridge	CB
Derrick Gore	RB
Nasir Greer	S
David Steinmetz	T

Down to 53

2022 Kansas City Chiefs Cut to 53
Name	Position
Zayne Anderson	S
Matt Bushman	TE
Dicaprio Bootle	CB
Mike Caliendo	G
Jermaine Carter	LB
Jack Cochrane	LB
Corey Coleman	WR
Dustin Crum	QB
Matt Dickerson	DT
Jerrion Ealy	RB
Tayon Fleet-Davis	RB
Daurice Fountain	WR
Jordan Franks	TE
Josh Gordon	WR
Vitaliy Gurman	T
Nazeeh Johnson	S
Roderick Johnson	T
Azur Kamara	DE
Devon Key	S
Elijah Lee	LB
Kehinde Oginni	DE
Aaron Parker	WR
Cornell Powell	WR
Austin Reiter	C
Mike Rose	LB
Danny Shelton	DT
Taylor Stallworth	DT

== Regular season transactions ==
Transactions below occurred after the Chiefs first game on September 11 and through their final game, which includes the playoffs.

=== Standard elevations ===
Players listed below were elevated using a standard elevation, which allows the Chiefs to add someone to the active roster from the practice squad then move back to the practice squad without needing to clear waivers first. This can only be used a maximum of 3 times per player.

2022 Kansas City Chiefs Practice squad elevations
Name	Position	Week(s) used
Daurice Fountain*	WR	1
Elijah Lee	LB	1, 4, 5
Matt Ammendola*	K	2, 3
Dicaprio Bootle	CB	2, 3, 7
Matthew Wright	K	4, 5, 18
Zayne Anderson	S	6, 12, 13
Cole Christiansen	LB	6
Marcus Kemp	WR	7, 11, DR, AC, SB
Ugo Amadi	S	10
Cornell Powell	WR	11, 12, 13
Ihmir Smith-Marsette	WR	14, 18, AC
Danny Shelton	DT	16
Austin Reiter	G	DR, SB

*No longer on the Chiefs practice squad

=== Signings ===
2022 Kansas City Chiefs signings
Name	Position
Dicaprio Bootle*	CB
Jack Cochrane*	LB
Nazeeh Johnson*	CB
Elijah Lee*	LB
Taylor Stallworth*	DT
Benton Whitley†	LB
Brandon Williams*	DT

*Activated off Chiefs' practice squad
†Signed off of another team's practice squad

=== Suspensions served ===
2022 Kansas City Chiefs suspensions
Name	Position	Policy violated	Weeks served
Willie Gay	LB	Personal conduct	3–6
Frank Clark	DE	Personal conduct	9–10

=== Cuts ===
2022 Kansas City Chiefs cuts
Name	Position
Dicaprio Bootle	CB
Geron Christian	T
Chris Lammons	CB
Elijah Lee	LB
Taylor Stallworth	DT
Benton Whitley	DE

=== Trades ===
Listed below are trades were a player was included in the trade.

2022 Kansas City Chiefs Trades
Team	Received	Compensation
New York Giants	WR Kadarius Toney	3rd round selection 2023 draft 6th round selection 2023 draft
Atlanta Falcons	7th round selection 2023 draft	CB Rashad Fenton

=== IR activations ===
Players listed below spent a portion of the season on injured reserve and were activated.

2022 Kansas City Chiefs IR activations
Position	Player	Dated added	Date activated
CB	Trent McDuffie	September 13	November 1
T	Lucas Niang	August 23 (PUP)	November 23
TE	Blake Bell	September 5	December 23
WR	Mecole Hardman	November 17	January 4*
TE	Jody Fortson	December 23	January 28
RB	Clyde Edwards-Helaire	November 23	February 6

*Hardman was once again placed on injured reserve on February 6.

== Staff ==
2022 Kansas City Chiefs staff
Front office: Chairman/CEO – Clark Hunt; President – Mark Donovan; General manager – Brett Veach; Assistant general manager – Mike Borgonzi; Vice president of football operations – Brandt Tilis; Vice president of football operations/team counsel – Chris Shea; Senior director of player personnel – Mike Bradway; Senior director of pro personnel – Tim Terry; Senior director of college scouting – Ryne Nutt; Senior personnel executive – Willie Davis; College scouting coordinator – Greg Castillo; Head coaches: Head coach – Andy Reid; Assistant head coach/special teams coordinator – Dave Toub; Assistant to the head coach – Dan Williams; Offensive coaches: Offensive coordinator – Eric Bieniemy; Senior assistant/quarterbacks – Matt Nagy; Pass game analyst/assistant quarterbacks – David Girardi; Running backs – Greg Lewis; Wide receivers – Joe Bleymaier; Tight ends – Tom Melvin; Offensive line – Andy Heck; Assistant offensive line – Corey Matthaei; Offensive quality control – Connor Embree; Offensive quality control – Porter Ellett	Defensive coaches: Defensive coordinator – Steve Spagnuolo; Defensive line – Joe Cullen; Assistant defensive line – Terry Bradden; Linebackers/run game coordinator – Brendan Daly; Outside linebackers – Ken Flajole; Defensive backs – Dave Merritt; Safeties – Donald D'Alesio; Defensive assistant – Rod Wilson; Defensive quality control – Alex Whittingham; Special teams coaches: Assistant special teams – Andy Hill; Strength and conditioning: Strength and conditioning – Barry Rubin; Assistant strength and conditioning – Greg Carbin; Assistant strength and conditioning – Tyler Judkins; Assistant strength and conditioning/director of sports science – Ryan Reynolds

== Final roster ==
2022 Kansas City Chiefs roster
Quarterbacks (QB): 12 Shane Buechele; 4 Chad Henne; 15 Patrick Mahomes; Running backs (RB): 45 Michael Burton; 25 Clyde Edwards-Helaire; 2 Ronald Jones; 1 Jerick McKinnon; 10 Isiah Pacheco; Wide receivers (WR): 24 Skyy Moore; 9 JuJu Smith-Schuster; 19 Kadarius Toney; 11 Marquez Valdes-Scantling; 84 Justin Watson; Tight ends (TE): 81 Blake Bell; 88 Jody Fortson; 83 Noah Gray; 87 Travis Kelce	Offensive linemen (OL): 73 Nick Allegretti G/C; 57 Orlando Brown T; 52 Creed Humphrey C; 75 Darian Kinnard T; 67 Lucas Niang T; 65 Trey Smith G; 62 Joe Thuney G; 70 Prince Tega Wanogho T; 77 Andrew Wylie T; Defensive linemen (DL): 55 Frank Clark DE; 51 Mike Danna DE; 8 Carlos Dunlap DE; 94 Malik Herring DE; 95 Chris Jones DT; 59 Joshua Kaindoh DE; 56 George Karlaftis DE; 91 Derrick Nnadi DT; 99 Khalen Saunders DT; 66 Brandon Williams DT	Linebackers (LB): 32 Nick Bolton MLB; 54 Leo Chenal OLB; 43 Jack Cochrane OLB/MLB; 50 Willie Gay OLB; 47 Darius Harris OLB; Defensive backs (DB): 26 Deon Bush SS; 6 Bryan Cook FS/SS; 13 Nazeeh Johnson FS; 21 Trent McDuffie CB; 20 Justin Reid SS; 38 L'Jarius Sneed CB; 22 Juan Thornhill FS; 35 Jaylen Watson CB; 23 Joshua Williams CB; Special teams (ST): 7 Harrison Butker K; 5 Tommy Townsend P; 41 James Winchester LS	Practice squad: 27 Ugo Amadi CB; 39 Zayne Anderson FS; 80 Kendall Blanton TE; 30 Dicaprio Bootle CB; 49 Matt Bushman TE; -- Mike Caliendo G; 48 Cole Christiansen OLB; 89 Jerrion Ealy WR; 46 Jordan Franks TE (PS/I); 34 Melvin Gordon RB; 92 Phil Hoskins DT; 85 Marcus Kemp WR; 6 Chris Oladokun QB; -- La'Mical Perine RB; 14 Cornell Powell WR (PS/I); 61 Austin Reiter C; 71 Danny Shelton DT; 82 Ihmir Smith-Marsette WR; Reserve: 17 Mecole Hardman WR (IR); -- Justyn Ross WR (IR); 98 Tershawn Wharton DT (IR); Rookies in italics 53 active, 3 reserve, 16 practice squad (2 exempt)

== Preseason ==
=== Schedule ===
Week	Date	Opponent	Result	Record	Venue	Recap
1	August 13	at Chicago Bears	L 14–19	0–1	Soldier Field	Recap
2	August 20	Washington Commanders	W 24–14	1–1	Arrowhead Stadium	Recap
3	August 25	Green Bay Packers	W 17–10	2–1	Arrowhead Stadium	Recap

=== Game summaries ===
KSHB carried the preseason games in the Kansas City area. Other networks throughout the region, primarily in Missouri and Kansas, also carried the games. Broadcasters provided are the Chiefs' broadcast. The Chiefs opponents also had their own broadcast team.

==== Week 1: at Chicago Bears ====
Week 1: Kansas City Chiefs at Chicago Bears – Game summary

Quarter	1	2	3	4	Total
Chiefs	7	7	0	0	14
Bears	0	0	16	3	19

at Soldier Field, Chicago, Illinois

- Date: August 13
- Game time: 12:00 p.m. CDT
- Game weather: Partly cloudy, 76 °F (24 °C)
- Game attendance: 61,406
- Referee: Tra Blake
- TV announcers (KSHB): Ari Wolfe, Trent Green and Kimmi Chex
- Recap, Game Book

Game information

First quarter

- KC – Blake Bell 5-yard pass from Patrick Mahomes (Harrison Butker kick), 7:20. Chiefs 7–0. Drive: 11 plays, 72 yards, 5:37.

Second quarter

- KC – Justin Watson 22-yard pass from Shane Buechele (Justin Reid kick), 0:20. Chiefs 14–0. Drive: 12 plays, 80 yards, 2:57.

Third quarter

- CHI – Trestan Ebner 12-yard pass from Trevor Siemian (run failed), 11:59. Chiefs 14–6. Drive: 6 plays, 27 yards, 2:40.
- CHI – Dazz Newsome 13-yard pass from Trevor Siemian (Cairo Santos kick), 6:34. Chiefs 14–13. Drive: 7 plays, 52 yards, 3:15.
- CHI – Cairo Santos 20-yard field goal, 4:18. Bears 16–14. Drive: 5 plays, 18 yards, 1:27.

Fourth quarter

- CHI – Cairo Santos 47-yard field goal, 5:58. Bears 19–14. Drive: 11 plays, 53 yards, 6:11.

Top passers

- KC – Shane Buechele – 12/19, 99 yards, TD, INT
- CHI – Trevor Siemian – 7/13, 89 yards, 2 TD

Top rushers

- KC – Dustin Crum – 3 rushes, 28 yards
- CHI – Trestan Ebner – 6 rushes, 31 yards

Top receivers

- KC – Justin Watson – 5 receptions, 45 yards, TD
- CHI – Tajae Sharpe – 2 receptions, 44 yards

==== Week 2: vs. Washington Commanders ====
Week 2: Washington Commanders at Kansas City Chiefs – Game summary

Quarter	1	2	3	4	Total
Commanders	0	7	0	7	14
Chiefs	7	7	3	7	24

at Arrowhead Stadium, Kansas City, Missouri

- Date: August 20
- Game time: 3:00 p.m. CDT
- Game weather: Cloudy, 82 °F (28 °C)
- Game attendance: 71,061
- Referee: Clete Blakeman
- TV announcers (KSHB): Ari Wolfe, Trent Green and Kimmi Chex
- Recap, Game Book

Game information

First quarter

- KC – Jody Fortson 5-yard pass from Patrick Mahomes (Harrison Butker kick), 5:12. Chiefs 7–0. Drive: 12 plays, 87 yards, 5:28.

Second quarter

- KC – Jody Fortson 7-yard pass from Patrick Mahomes (Harrison Butker kick), 13:14. Chiefs 14–0. Drive: 12 plays, 82 yards, 5:25.
- WAS – Cam Sims 9-yard pass from Taylor Heinicke (Joey Slye kick), 0:16. Chiefs 14–7. Drive: 11 plays, 84 yards, 3:16.

Third quarter

- KC – Harrison Butker 36-yard field goal, 12:50. Chiefs 17–7. Drive: 7 plays, 57 yards, 2:10.

Fourth quarter

- WAS – Jaret Patterson 1-yard run (Joey Slye kick), 7:05. Chiefs 17–14. Drive: 8 plays, 93 yards, 3:35.
- KC – Tayon Fleet-Davis 1-yard run (Harrison Butker kick), 2:06. Chiefs 24–14. Drive: 3 plays, 3 yards, 0:19.

Top passers

- WAS – Sam Howell – 10/18, 122 yards, INT
- KC – Patrick Mahomes – 12/19, 162 yards, 2 TD

Top rushers

- WAS – Brian Robinson Jr. – 8 rushes, 31 yards
- KC – Shane Buechele – 5 rushes, 35 yards

Top receivers

- WAS – Alex Erickson – 3 receptions, 44 yards
- KC – Justin Watson – 2 receptions, 53 yards

==== Week 3: vs. Green Bay Packers ====
Week 3: Green Bay Packers at Kansas City Chiefs – Game summary

Quarter	1	2	3	4	Total
Packers	0	10	0	0	10
Chiefs	3	7	7	0	17

at Arrowhead Stadium, Kansas City, Missouri

- Date: August 25
- Game time: 7:00 p.m. CDT
- Game weather: Clear, 89 °F (32 °C)
- Game attendance: 70,316
- Referee: Craig Wrolstad
- TV announcers (KSHB): Ari Wolfe, Trent Green and Kimmi Chex
- Recap, Game Book

Game information

First quarter

- KC – Harrison Butker 44-yard field goal, 3:51. Chiefs 3–0. Drive: 11 plays, 36 yards, 4:34.

Second quarter

- GB – Tyler Goodson 24-yard run (Ramiz Ahmed kick), 12:58. Packers 7–3. Drive: 11 plays, 83 yards, 5:53.
- KC – Matt Bushman 54-yard pass from Shane Buechele (Harrison Butker kick), 8:45. Chiefs 10–7. Drive: 7 plays, 90 yards, 4:13.
- GB – Ramiz Ahmed 23-yard field goal, 1:48. Tied 10–10. Drive: 13 plays, 75 yards, 6:57.

Third quarter

- KC – Matt Bushman 2-yard pass from Shane Buechele (Harrison Butker kick), 12:25. Chiefs 17–10. Drive: 5 plays, 54 yards, 2:35.

Fourth quarter

- No scoring plays.

Top passers

- GB – Jordan Love – 16/26, 148 yards, INT
- KC – Shane Buechele – 11/17, 166 yards, 2 TD

Top rushers

- GB – Patrick Taylor – 7 rushes, 34 yards
- KC – Isiah Pacheco – 10 rushes, 52 yards

Top receivers

- GB – Samori Toure – 6 receptions, 83 yards
- KC – Matt Bushman – 3 receptions, 73 yards, 2 TD

== Regular season ==
=== Schedule ===
Week	Date	Opponent	Result	Record	Venue	Recap
1	September 11	at Arizona Cardinals	**W** 44–21	1–0	State Farm Stadium	Recap
2	September 15	**Los Angeles Chargers**	**W** 27–24	2–0	Arrowhead Stadium	Recap
3	September 25	at Indianapolis Colts	**L** 17–20	2–1	Lucas Oil Stadium	Recap
4	October 2	at Tampa Bay Buccaneers	**W** 41–31	3–1	Raymond James Stadium	Recap
5	October 10	**Las Vegas Raiders**	**W** 30–29	4–1	Arrowhead Stadium	Recap
6	October 16	Buffalo Bills	**L** 20–24	4–2	Arrowhead Stadium	Recap
7	October 23	at San Francisco 49ers	**W** 44–23	5–2	Levi's Stadium	Recap
8	Bye					
9	November 6	Tennessee Titans	**W** 20–17 (OT)	6–2	Arrowhead Stadium	Recap
10	November 13	Jacksonville Jaguars	**W** 27–17	7–2	Arrowhead Stadium	Recap
11	November 20	at **Los Angeles Chargers**	**W** 30–27	8–2	SoFi Stadium	Recap
12	November 27	Los Angeles Rams	**W** 26–10	9–2	Arrowhead Stadium	Recap
13	December 4	at Cincinnati Bengals	**L** 24–27	9–3	Paycor Stadium	Recap
14	December 11	at **Denver Broncos**	**W** 34–28	10–3	Empower Field at Mile High	Recap
15	December 18	at Houston Texans	**W** 30–24 (OT)	11–3	NRG Stadium	Recap
16	December 24	Seattle Seahawks	**W** 24–10	12–3	Arrowhead Stadium	Recap
17	January 1	**Denver Broncos**	**W** 27–24	13–3	Arrowhead Stadium	Recap
18	January 7	at **Las Vegas Raiders**	**W** 31–13	14–3	Allegiant Stadium	Recap

Note: Intra-division opponents are in bold text.

=== Game summaries ===
==== Week 1: at Arizona Cardinals ====
Week 1: Kansas City Chiefs at Arizona Cardinals – Game summary

Quarter	1	2	3	4	Total
**Chiefs**	14	9	14	7	**44**
Cardinals	0	7	0	14	**21**

at State Farm Stadium, Glendale, Arizona

- Date: September 11
- Game time: 3:25 p.m. CDT/1:25 p.m. MST (Note: While Arizona lies entirely within the Mountain Time Zone, because the state does not observe daylight saving time (excluding the Navajo Nation), Arizona is one hour behind Mountain Daylight Time from March to November.)
- Game weather: None (retractable roof closed)
- Game attendance: 63,697
- Referee: Scott Novak
- TV announcers (CBS): Jim Nantz, Tony Romo and Tracy Wolfson
- Recap, Game Book

Game information

**First quarter**

- KC – Travis Kelce 9-yard pass from Patrick Mahomes (Harrison Butker kick), 9:37. Chiefs 7–0. **Drive: 11 plays, 75 yards, 5:23.**
- KC – Clyde Edwards-Helaire 3-yard pass from Patrick Mahomes (Justin Reid kick), 3:20. Chiefs 14–0. **Drive: 7 plays, 86 yards, 4:23.**

**Second quarter**

- ARI – James Conner 2-yard run (Matt Prater kick), 13:05. Chiefs 14–7. **Drive: 11 plays, 75 yards, 5:15.**
- KC – Clyde Edwards-Helaire 4-yard pass from Patrick Mahomes (kick failed, wide right), 7:32. Chiefs 20–7. **Drive: 11 plays, 75 yards, 5:33.**
- KC – Harrison Butker 54-yard field goal, 0:02. Chiefs 23–7. **Drive: 6 plays, 30 yards, 0:33.**

**Third quarter**

- KC – Jody Fortson 1-yard pass from Patrick Mahomes (Harrison Butker kick), 9:55. Chiefs 30–7. **Drive: 4 plays, 75 yards, 2:12.**
- KC – Mecole Hardman 2-yard pass from Patrick Mahomes (Harrison Butker kick), 3:56. Chiefs 37–7. **Drive: 8 plays, 66 yards, 4:53.**

**Fourth quarter**

- ARI – Marquise Brown 6-yard pass from Kyler Murray (Kyler Murray–Zach Ertz pass), 12:52. Chiefs 37–15. **Drive: 14 plays, 75 yards, 6:04.**
- KC – Isiah Pacheco 3-yard run (Harrison Butker kick), 7:39. Chiefs 44–15. **Drive: 9 plays, 66 yards, 5:13.**
- ARI – Zach Ertz 6-yard pass from Kyler Murray (pass failed), 5:11. Chiefs 44–21. **Drive: 6 plays, 48 yards, 2:28.**

**Top passers**

- KC – Patrick Mahomes – 30/39, 360 yards, 5 TD
- ARI – Kyler Murray – 22/34, 193 yards, 2 TD

**Top rushers**

- KC – Isiah Pacheco – 12 rushes, 62 yards, TD
- ARI – Kyler Murray – 5 rushes, 29 yards

**Top receivers**

- KC – Travis Kelce – 8 receptions, 121 yards, TD
- ARI – Greg Dortch – 7 receptions, 63 yards

==== Week 2: vs. Los Angeles Chargers ====
Week 2: Los Angeles Chargers at Kansas City Chiefs – Game summary

Quarter	1	2	3	4	Total
Chargers	3	7	7	7	**24**
**Chiefs**	0	7	7	13	**27**

at Arrowhead Stadium, Kansas City, Missouri

- Date: September 15
- Game time: 7:15 p.m. CDT
- Game weather: 81 °F (27 °C)
- Game attendance: 73,461
- Referee: John Hussey
- TV announcers (KSHB/Prime Video): Al Michaels, Kirk Herbstreit, and Kaylee Hartung
- Recap, Game Book

Game information

**First quarter**

- LAC – Dustin Hopkins 31-yard field goal, 5:58. Chargers 3–0. **Drive: 11 plays, 67 yards, 4:41.**

**Second quarter**

- LAC – Zander Horvath 1-yard pass from Justin Herbert (Dustin Hopkins kick), 14:57. Chargers 10–0. **Drive: 8 plays, 58 yards, 3:50.**
- KC – Jerick McKinnon 9-yard pass from Patrick Mahomes (Matt Ammendola kick), 11:38. Chargers 10–7. **Drive: 7 plays, 75 yards, 3:19.**

**Third quarter**

- LAC – Mike Williams 15-yard pass from Justin Herbert (Dustin Hopkins kick), 9:52. Chargers 17–7. **Drive: 11 plays, 75 yards, 5:08.**
- KC – Justin Watson 41-yard pass from Patrick Mahomes (Matt Ammendola kick), 7:22. Chargers 17–14. **Drive: 7 plays, 75 yards, 2:30.**

**Fourth quarter**

- KC – Matt Ammendola 19-yard field goal, 14:48. Tied 17–17. **Drive: 9 plays, 35 yards, 4:01.**
- KC – Jaylen Watson 99-yard interception return (Matt Ammendola kick), 10:29. Chiefs 24–17.
- KC – Matt Ammendola 32-yard field goal, 3:20. Chiefs 27–17. **Drive: 5 plays, 72 yards, 0:35.**
- LAC – Josh Palmer 7-yard pass from Justin Herbert (Dustin Hopkins kick), 1:11. Chiefs 27–24. **Drive: 9 plays, 73 yards, 2:09.**

**Top passers**

- LAC – Justin Herbert – 33/48, 334 yards, 3 TD, INT
- KC – Patrick Mahomes – 24/35, 235 yards, 2 TD

**Top rushers**

- LAC – Austin Ekeler – 14 rushes, 39 yards
- KC – Clyde Edwards-Helaire – 8 rushes, 74 yards

**Top receivers**

- LAC – Austin Ekeler – 9 receptions, 55 yards
- KC – Travis Kelce – 5 receptions, 51 yards

==== Week 3: at Indianapolis Colts ====
Week 3: Kansas City Chiefs at Indianapolis Colts – Game summary

Quarter	1	2	3	4	Total
Chiefs	6	8	3	0	**17**
**Colts**	7	3	3	7	**20**

at Lucas Oil Stadium, Indianapolis, Indiana

- Date: September 25
- Game time: 12:00 p.m. CDT/1:00 p.m. EDT
- Game weather: Cloudy, 65 °F (18 °C) (retractable roof open)
- Game attendance: 65,975
- Referee: Shawn Smith
- TV announcers (CBS): Jim Nantz, Tony Romo and Tracy Wolfson
- Recap, Game Book

Game information

**First quarter**

- IND – Jelani Woods 1-yard pass from Matt Ryan (Chase McLaughlin kick), 12:23. Colts 7–0. **Drive: 3 plays, 4 yards, 1:23.**
- KC – Travis Kelce 3-yard pass from Patrick Mahomes (kick failed, wide left), 0:34. Colts 7–6. **Drive: 4 plays, 35 yards, 2:03.**

**Second quarter**

- IND – Chase McLaughlin 43-yard field goal, 9:40. Colts 10–6. **Drive: 11 plays, 46 yards, 5:54.**
- KC – Clyde Edwards-Helaire 1-yard run (Patrick Mahomes–Travis Kelce pass), 1:46. Chiefs 14–10. **Drive: 5 plays, 21 yards, 1:37.**

**Third quarter**

- KC – Matt Ammendola 26-yard field goal, 7:56. Chiefs 17–10. **Drive: 15 plays, 62 yards, 7:04.**
- IND – Chase McLaughlin 51-yard field goal, 2:53. Chiefs 17–13. **Drive: 10 plays, 42 yards, 5:03.**

**Fourth quarter**

- IND – Jelani Woods 12-yard pass from Matt Ryan (Chase McLaughlin kick), 0:24. Colts 20–17. **Drive: 16 plays, 76 yards, 8:14.**

**Top passers**

- KC – Patrick Mahomes – 20/35, 262 yards, TD, INT
- IND – Matt Ryan – 27/37, 222 yards, 2 TD

**Top rushers**

- KC – Patrick Mahomes – 4 rushes, 26 yards
- IND – Johnathan Taylor – 21 rushes, 71 yards

**Top receivers**

- KC – JuJu Smith-Schuster – 5 receptions, 89 yards
- IND – Michael Pittman Jr. – 8 receptions, 72 yards

==== Week 4: at Tampa Bay Buccaneers ====
Week 4: Kansas City Chiefs at Tampa Bay Buccaneers – Game summary

Quarter	1	2	3	4	Total
**Chiefs**	14	14	10	3	**41**
Buccaneers	3	14	7	7	**31**

at Raymond James Stadium, Tampa, Florida

- Date: October 2
- Game time: 7:20 p.m. CDT/8:20 p.m. EDT
- Game weather: Clear, 75 °F (24 °C)
- Game attendance: 68,348
- Referee: Bill Vinovich
- TV announcers (NBC): Mike Tirico, Cris Collinsworth and Melissa Stark
- Recap, Game Book

Game information

**First quarter**

- KC – Travis Kelce 16-yard pass from Patrick Mahomes (Matthew Wright kick), 14:14. Chiefs 7–0. **Drive: 2 plays, 21 yards, 0:42.**
- TB – Ryan Succop 45-yard field goal, 3:01. Chiefs 7–3. **Drive: 7 plays, 45 yards, 4:02.**
- KC – Clyde Edwards-Helaire 3-yard run (Matthew Wright kick), 4:01. Chiefs 14–3. **Drive: 12 plays, 79 yards, 6:11.**

**Second quarter**

- KC – Clyde Edwards-Helaire 2-yard pass from Patrick Mahomes (Matthew Wright kick), 11:26. Chiefs 21–3. **Drive: 11 plays, 82 yards, 5:52.**
- TB – Mike Evans 13-yard pass from Tom Brady (Ryan Succop kick), 8:50. Chiefs 21–10. **Drive: 6 plays, 75 yards, 2:36.**
- KC – Noah Gray 1-yard run (Matthew Wright kick), 2:11. Chiefs 28–10. **Drive: 6 plays, 20 yards, 2:51.**
- TB – Mike Evans 1-yard pass from Tom Brady (Ryan Succop kick), 0:10. Chiefs 28–17. **Drive: 12 plays, 75 yards, 2:01.**

**Third quarter**

- KC – Matthew Wright 44-yard field goal, 11:26. Chiefs 31–17. **Drive: 10 plays, 49 yards, 3:34.**
- KC – Jody Fortson 10-yard pass from Patrick Mahomes (Ryan Succop kick), 5:42. Chiefs 38–17. **Drive: 9 plays, 65 yards, 4:49.**
- TB – Rachaad White 1-yard run (Ryan Succop kick), 0:44. Chiefs 38–24. **Drive: 11 plays, 75 yards, 4:58.**

**Fourth quarter**

- KC – Matthew Wright 32-yard field goal, 10:47. Chiefs 41–24. **Drive: 9 plays, 46 yards, 4:57.**
- TB – Leonard Fournette 5-yard pass from Tom Brady (Ryan Succop kick), 3:30. Chiefs 41–31. **Drive: 5 plays, 34 yards, 1:12.**

**Top passers**

- KC – Patrick Mahomes – 23/37, 249 yards, 3 TD, INT
- TB – Tom Brady – 39/52, 385 yards, 3 TD

**Top rushers**

- KC – Clyde Edwards-Helaire – 19 rushes, 92 yards, TD
- TB – Rachaad White – 3 rushes, 6 yards, TD

**Top receivers**

- KC – Travis Kelce – 9 receptions, 92 yards, TD
- TB – Mike Evans – 8 receptions, 103 yards, 2 TD

==== Week 5: vs. Las Vegas Raiders ====
Week 5: Las Vegas Raiders at Kansas City Chiefs – Game summary

Quarter	1	2	3	4	Total
Raiders	7	13	0	9	**29**
**Chiefs**	0	10	14	6	**30**

at Arrowhead Stadium, Kansas City, Missouri

- Date: October 10
- Game time: 7:15 p.m. CDT
- Game weather: Cloudy, 77 °F (25 °C)
- Game attendance: 73,523
- Referee: Carl Cheffers
- TV announcers (KCTV/ESPN): Joe Buck, Troy Aikman and Lisa Salters
- Recap, Game Book

Game information

**First quarter**

- LV – Davante Adams 58-yard pass from Derek Carr (Daniel Carlson kick), 8:27. Raiders 7–0. **Drive: 4 plays, 67 yards, 2:52.**

**Second quarter**

- LV – Josh Jacobs 1-yard run (Daniel Carlson kick), 14:00. Raiders 14–0. **Drive: 10 plays, 69 yards, 5:03.**
- LV – Daniel Carlson 53-yard field goal, 9:22. Raiders 17–0. **Drive: 6 plays, 43 yards, 3:03.**
- KC – Travis Kelce 1-yard pass from Patrick Mahomes (Matthew Wright kick), 4:40. Raiders 17–7. **Drive: 11 plays, 75 yards, 4:42.**
- LV – Daniel Carlson 50-yard field goal, 0:17. Raiders 20–7. **Drive: 9 plays, 43 yards, 4:23.**
- KC – Matthew Wright 59-yard field goal, 0:00. Raiders 20–10. **Drive: 4 plays, 34 yards, 0:17.**

**Third quarter**

- KC – Travis Kelce 4-yard pass from Patrick Mahomes (Matthew Wright kick), 9:25. Raiders 20–17. **Drive: 12 plays, 75 yards, 5:35.**
- KC – Travis Kelce 8-yard pass from Patrick Mahomes (Matthew Wright kick), 3:20. Chiefs 24–20. **Drive: 8 plays, 57 yards, 3:44.**

**Fourth quarter**

- LV – Daniel Carlson 47-yard field goal, 14:05. Chiefs 24–23. **Drive: 8 plays, 55 yards, 4:15.**
- KC – Travis Kelce 1-yard pass from Patrick Mahomes (pass failed), 7:25. Chiefs 30–23. **Drive: 13 plays, 65 yards, 6:40.**
- LV – Davante Adams 48-yard pass from Derek Carr (run failed), 4:27. Chiefs 30–29. **Drive: 7 plays, 75 yards, 2:58.**

**Top passers**

- LV – Derek Carr – 19/30, 241 yards, 2 TD
- KC – Patrick Mahomes – 29/43, 292 yards, 4 TD

**Top rushers**

- LV – Josh Jacobs – 21 rushes, 154 yards, TD
- KC – Jerick McKinnon – 8 rushes, 53 yards

**Top receivers**

- LV – Davante Adams – 3 receptions, 124 yards, 2 TD
- KC – Marquez Valdes-Scantling – 6 receptions, 90 yards

==== Week 6: vs. Buffalo Bills ====
Week 6: Buffalo Bills at Kansas City Chiefs – Game summary

Quarter	1	2	3	4	Total
**Bills**	0	10	7	7	**24**
Chiefs	0	10	7	3	**20**

at Arrowhead Stadium, Kansas City, Missouri

- Date: October 16
- Game time: 3:25 p.m. CDT
- Game weather: 62 °F (17 °C)
- Game attendance: 73,586
- Referee: Brad Allen
- TV announcers (CBS): Jim Nantz, Tony Romo and Tracy Wolfson
- Recap, Game Book

Game information

**First quarter**

- No scoring plays.

**Second quarter**

- BUF – Tyler Bass 39-yard field goal, 13:32. Bills 3–0. **Drive: 11 plays, 59 yards, 4:44.**
- KC – JuJu Smith-Schuster 42-yard pass from Patrick Mahomes (Harrison Butker kick), 11:31. Chiefs 7–3. **Drive: 6 plays, 79 yards, 2:01.**
- BUF – Gabe Davis 34-yard pass from Josh Allen (Tyler Bass kick), 0:16. Bills 10–7. **Drive: 7 plays, 96 yards, 1:13.**
- KC – Harrison Butker 62-yard field goal, 0:00. Tied 10–10. **Drive: 3 plays, 28 yards, 0:16.**

**Third quarter**

- BUF – Stefon Diggs 17-yard pass from Josh Allen (Tyler Bass kick), 7:02. Bills 17–10. **Drive: 6 plays, 59 yards, 3:13.**
- KC – Mecole Hardman 3-yard pass from Patrick Mahomes (Harrison Butker kick), 2:44. Tied 17–17. **Drive: 7 plays, 83 yards, 4:18.**

**Fourth quarter**

- KC – Harrison Butker 44-yard field goal, 9:49. Chiefs 20–17. **Drive: 8 plays, 28 yards, 4:23.**
- BUF – Dawson Knox 14-yard pass from Josh Allen (Tyler Bass kick), 1:04. Bills 24–20. **Drive: 12 plays, 76 yards, 4:27.**

**Top passers**

- BUF – Josh Allen – 27/40, 329 yards, 3 TD
- KC – Patrick Mahomes – 25/40, 338 yards, 2 TD, 2 INT

**Top rushers**

- BUF – Devin Singletary – 17 rushes, 85 yards
- KC – Clyde Edwards-Helaire – 9 rushes, 33 yards

**Top receivers**

- BUF – Stefon Diggs – 10 receptions, 148 yards, TD
- KC – JuJu Smith-Schuster – 5 receptions, 113 yards, TD

==== Week 7: at San Francisco 49ers ====
Week 7: Kansas City Chiefs at San Francisco 49ers – Game summary

Quarter	1	2	3	4	Total
**Chiefs**	7	7	14	16	**44**
49ers	10	3	3	7	**23**

at Levi's Stadium, Santa Clara, California

- Date: October 23
- Game time: 3:25 p.m. CDT/1:25 p.m. PDT
- Game weather: Clear, sunny, 64 °F (18 °C)
- Game attendance: 71,746
- Referee: Alex Kemp
- TV announcers (Fox): Kevin Burkhardt, Greg Olsen, Erin Andrews and Tom Rinaldi
- Recap, Game Book

Game information

**First quarter**

- SF – Robbie Gould 30-yard field goal, 10:22. 49ers 3–0. **Drive: 10 plays, 63 yards, 4:38.**
- SF – Ray-Ray McCloud 8-yard pass from Jimmy Garoppolo (Robbie Gould kick), 6:29. 49ers 10–0. **Drive: 4 plays, 34 yards, 2:14.**
- KC – Mecole Hardman 8-yard pass from Patrick Mahomes (Harrison Butker kick), 2:07. 49ers 10–7. **Drive: 9 plays, 73 yards, 4:22.**

**Second quarter**

- SF – Robbie Gould 50-yard field goal, 12:11. 49ers 13–7. **Drive: 10 plays, 46 yards, 4:56.**
- KC – Mecole Hardman 25-yard run (Harrison Butker kick), 7:09. Chiefs 14–13. **Drive: 10 plays, 90 yards, 5:02.**

**Third quarter**

- KC – Clyde Edwards-Helaire 16-yard run (Harrison Butker kick), 13:28. Chiefs 21–13. **Drive: 3 plays, 33 yards, 1:12.**
- SF – Robbie Gould 49-yard field goal, 7:41. Chiefs 21–16. **Drive: 11 plays, 52 yards, 5:47.**
- KC – Justin Watson 4-yard pass from Patrick Mahomes (Harrison Butker kick), 3:31. Chiefs 28–16. **Drive: 9 plays, 75 yards, 4:10.**

**Fourth quarter**

- SF – George Kittle 15-yard pass from Jimmy Garoppolo (Robbie Gould kick), 14:16. Chiefs 28–23. **Drive: 8 plays, 75 yards, 4:15.**
- KC – Mecole Hardman 3-yard run (Harrison Butker kick), 10:43. Chiefs 35–23. **Drive: 6 plays, 80 yards, 3:33.**
- KC – Jimmy Garoppolo sacked in end zone by Frank Clark for a Safety, 8:49. Chiefs 37–23.
- KC – JuJu Smith-Schuster 45-yard pass from Patrick Mahomes (Harrison Butker kick), 6:05. Chiefs 44–23. **Drive: 5 plays, 72 yards, 2:44.**

**Top passers**

- KC – Patrick Mahomes – 25/34, 423 yards, 3 TD, INT
- SF – Jimmy Garoppolo – 25/37, 303 yards, 2 TD, INT

**Top rushers**

- KC – Isiah Pacheco – 8 rushes, 43 yards
- SF – Jeff Wilson Jr. – 7 rushes, 54 yards

**Top receivers**

- KC – JuJu Smith-Schuster – 7 receptions, 124 yards, TD
- SF – George Kittle – 6 receptions, 98 yards, TD

==== Week 9: vs. Tennessee Titans ====
Week 9: Tennessee Titans at Kansas City Chiefs – Game summary

Quarter	1	2	3	4	OT	Total
Titans	0	14	3	0	0	**17**
**Chiefs**	3	6	0	8	3	**20**

at Arrowhead Stadium, Kansas City, Missouri

- Date: November 6
- Game time: 7:20 p.m. CST
- Game weather: 58 °F (14 °C)
- Game attendance: 73,475
- Referee: Clete Blakeman
- TV announcers (NBC): Mike Tirico, Cris Collinsworth and Melissa Stark
- Recap, Game Book

Game information

**First quarter**

- KC – Harrison Butker 23-yard field goal, 6:47. Chiefs 3–0. **Drive: 15 plays, 69 yards, 8:13.**

**Second quarter**

- KC – Mecole Hardman 7-yard pass from Patrick Mahomes (kick failed, wide left), 14:55. Chiefs 9–0. **Drive: 9 plays, 79 yards, 4:30.**
- TEN – Derrick Henry 4-yard run (Randy Bullock kick), 10:48. Chiefs 9–7. **Drive: 7 plays, 74 yards, 4:07.**
- TEN – Derrick Henry 1-yard run (Randy Bullock kick), 5:24. Titans 14–9. **Drive: 5 plays, 79 yards, 2:50.**

**Third quarter**

- TEN – Randy Bullock 44-yard field goal, 9:58. Titans 17–9. **Drive: 4 plays, 8 yards, 1:29.**

**Fourth quarter**

- KC – Patrick Mahomes 14-yard run (Patrick Mahomes run), 2:56. Tied 17–17. **Drive: 13 plays, 93 yards, 6:58.**

**Overtime**

- KC – Harrison Butker 28-yard field goal, 4:04. Chiefs 20–17. **Drive: 13 plays, 64 yards, 5:56.**

**Top passers**

- TEN – Malik Willis – 5/16, 80 yards
- KC – Patrick Mahomes – 43/68, 446 yards, TD, INT

**Top rushers**

- TEN – Derrick Henry – 17 rushes, 115 yards, 2 TD
- KC – Patrick Mahomes – 6 rushes, 63 yards, TD

**Top receivers**

- TEN – Austin Hooper – 2 receptions, 34 yards
- KC – Travis Kelce – 10 receptions, 106 yards

==== Week 10: vs. Jacksonville Jaguars ====
Week 10: Jacksonville Jaguars at Kansas City Chiefs – Game summary

Quarter	1	2	3	4	Total
Jaguars	0	7	3	7	**17**
**Chiefs**	7	13	7	0	**27**

at Arrowhead Stadium, Kansas City, Missouri

- Date: November 13
- Game time: 12:00 p.m. CST
- Game weather: 33 °F (1 °C)
- Game attendance: 73,493
- Referee: Brad Rogers
- TV announcers (CBS): Jim Nantz, Tony Romo and Tracy Wolfson
- Recap, Game Book

Game information

**First quarter**

- KC – Kadarius Toney 6-yard pass from Patrick Mahomes (Harrison Butker kick), 3:32. Chiefs 7–0. **Drive: 5 plays, 80 yards, 2:38.**

**Second quarter**

- KC – Marquez Valdes-Scantling 18-yard pass from Patrick Mahomes (Harrison Butker kick), 9:55. Chiefs 14–0. **Drive: 3 plays, 59 yards, 1:23.**
- KC – Noah Gray 13-yard pass from Patrick Mahomes (kick failed, wide left), 0:46. Chiefs 20–0. **Drive: 8 plays, 86 yards, 2:35.**
- JAX – Christian Kirk 3-yard pass from Trevor Lawrence (Riley Patterson kick), 0:11. Chiefs 20–7. **Drive: 5 plays, 61 yards, 0:35.**

**Third quarter**

- JAX – Riley Patterson 35-yard field goal, 5:46. Chiefs 20–10. **Drive: 17 plays, 58 yards, 9:14.**
- KC – Travis Kelce 7-yard pass from Patrick Mahomes (Harrison Butker kick), 0:38. Chiefs 27–10. **Drive: 10 plays, 75 yards, 5:08.**

**Fourth quarter**

- JAX – Christian Kirk 19-yard pass from Trevor Lawrence (Riley Patterson kick), 5:26. Chiefs 27–17. **Drive: 8 plays, 54 yards, 2:29.**

**Top passers**

- JAX – Trevor Lawrence – 29/40, 259 yards, 2 TD
- KC – Patrick Mahomes – 26/35, 331 yards, 4 TD, INT

**Top rushers**

- JAX – Travis Etienne – 11 rushes, 45 yards
- KC – Isiah Pacheco – 16 rushes, 82 yards

**Top receivers**

- JAX – Christian Kirk – 9 receptions, 102 yards, 2 TD
- KC – Travis Kelce – 6 receptions, 81 yards, TD

==== Week 11: at Los Angeles Chargers ====
Week 11: Kansas City Chiefs at Los Angeles Chargers – Game summary

Quarter	1	2	3	4	Total
**Chiefs**	6	7	3	14	**30**
Chargers	10	10	0	7	**27**

at SoFi Stadium, Inglewood, California

- Date: November 20
- Game time: 7:20 p.m. CST/5:20 p.m. PST
- Game weather: 67 °F (19 °C)
- Game attendance: 70,240
- Referee: Shawn Hochuli
- TV announcers (NBC): Mike Tirico, Cris Collinsworth and Melissa Stark
- Recap, Game Book

Game information

**First quarter**

- KC – Harrison Butker 33-yard field goal, 10:54. Chiefs 3–0. **Drive: 11 plays, 60 yards, 4:06.**
- LAC – Josh Palmer 50-yard pass from Justin Herbert (Cameron Dicker kick), 9:33. Chargers 7–3. **Drive: 3 plays, 75 yards, 1:21.**
- KC – Harrison Butker 52-yard field goal, 5:58. Chargers 7–6. **Drive: 7 plays, 41 yards, 3:35.**
- LAC – Cameron Dicker 46-yard field goal, 2:35. Chargers 10–6. **Drive: 9 plays, 47 yards, 3:23.**

**Second quarter**

- KC – Travis Kelce 4-yard pass from Patrick Mahomes (Harrison Butker kick), 14:13. Chiefs 13–10. **Drive: 7 plays, 75 yards, 3:22.**
- LAC – Austin Ekeler 1-yard run (Cameron Dicker kick), 3:31. Chargers 17–13. **Drive: 13 plays, 70 yards, 7:03.**
- LAC – Cameron Dicker 21-yard field goal, 0:14. Chargers 20–13. **Drive: 9 plays, 58 yards, 2:27.**

**Third quarter**

- KC – Harrison Butker 30-yard field goal, 6:22. Chargers 20–16. **Drive: 9 plays, 56 yards, 4:50.**

**Fourth quarter**

- KC – Travis Kelce 32-yard pass from Patrick Mahomes (Harrison Butker kick), 14:50. Chiefs 23–20. **Drive: 10 plays, 86 yards, 4:55.**
- LAC – Josh Palmer 6-yard pass from Justin Herbert (Cameron Dicker kick), 1:46. Chargers 27–23. **Drive: 10 plays, 64 yards, 5:01.**
- KC – Travis Kelce 17-yard pass from Patrick Mahomes (Harrison Butker kick), 0:31. Chiefs 30–27. **Drive: 6 plays, 75 yards, 1:15.**

**Top passers**

- KC – Patrick Mahomes – 20/34, 329 yards, 3 TD
- LAC – Justin Herbert – 23/30, 280 yards, 2 TD, INT

**Top rushers**

- KC – Isiah Pacheco – 15 rushes, 105 yards
- LAC – Austin Ekeler – 19 rushes, 83 yards, TD

**Top receivers**

- KC – Travis Kelce – 6 receptions, 115 yards, 3 TD
- LAC – Josh Palmer – 8 receptions, 106 yards, 2 TD

==== Week 12: vs. Los Angeles Rams ====
Week 12: Los Angeles Rams at Kansas City Chiefs – Game summary

Quarter	1	2	3	4	Total
Rams	0	3	0	7	**10**
**Chiefs**	7	6	7	6	**26**

at Arrowhead Stadium, Kansas City, Missouri

- Date: November 27
- Game time: 3:25 p.m. CST
- Game weather: 44 °F (7 °C)
- Game attendance: 73,557
- Referee: Adrian Hill
- TV announcers (Fox): Kevin Burkhardt, Greg Olsen, Erin Andrews and Tom Rinaldi
- Recap, Game Book

Game information

**First quarter**

- KC – Travis Kelce 39-yard pass from Patrick Mahomes (Harrison Butker kick), 5:40. Chiefs 7–0. **Drive: 9 plays, 90 yards, 4:20.**

**Second quarter**

- LAR – Matt Gay 47-yard field goal, 14:57. Chiefs 7–3. **Drive: 10 plays, 46 yards, 5:43.**
- KC – Harrison Butker 27-yard field goal, 9:50. Chiefs 10–3. **Drive: 12 plays, 66 yards, 5:07.**
- KC – Harrison Butker 32-yard field goal, 0:16. Chiefs 13–3. **Drive: 13 plays, 83 yards, 3:00.**

**Third quarter**

- KC – Isiah Pacheco 3-yard run (Harrison Butker kick), 6:32. Chiefs 20–3. **Drive: 12 plays, 71 yards, 6:52.**

**Fourth quarter**

- LAR – Van Jefferson 7-yard pass from Bryce Perkins (Matt Gay kick), 14:56. Chiefs 20–10. **Drive: 14 plays, 75 yards, 6:36.**
- KC – Harrison Butker 22-yard field goal, 6:36. Chiefs 23–10. **Drive: 4 plays, 5 yards, 1:33.**
- KC – Harrison Butker 22-yard field goal, 1:44. Chiefs 26–10. **Drive: 9 plays, 24 yards, 3:33.**

**Top passers**

- LAR – Bryce Perkins – 13/23, 100 yards, TD, 2 INT
- KC – Patrick Mahomes – 27/42, 320 yards, TD, INT

**Top rushers**

- LAR – Bryce Perkins – 9 rushes, 44 yards
- KC – Isiah Pacheco – 22 rushes, 69 yards, TD

**Top receivers**

- LAR – Van Jefferson – 7 receptions, 29 yards, TD
- KC – Travis Kelce – 4 receptions, 57 yards, TD

==== Week 13: at Cincinnati Bengals ====
Week 13: Kansas City Chiefs at Cincinnati Bengals – Game summary

Quarter	1	2	3	4	Total
Chiefs	3	7	14	0	**24**
**Bengals**	7	7	3	10	**27**

at Paycor Stadium, Cincinnati, Ohio

- Date: December 4
- Game time: 3:25 p.m. CST/4:25 p.m. EST
- Game weather: Sunny, 41 °F (5 °C)
- Game attendance: 66,243
- Referee: John Hussey
- TV announcers (CBS): Jim Nantz, Tony Romo and Tracy Wolfson
- Recap, Game Book

Game information

**First quarter**

- CIN – Joe Burrow 4-yard run (Evan McPherson kick), 8:49. Bengals 7–0. **Drive: 11 plays, 75 yards, 6:11.**
- KC – Harrison Butker 26-yard field goal, 3:56. Bengals 7–3. **Drive: 10 plays, 65 yards, 4:53.**

**Second quarter**

- CIN – Tee Higgins 12-yard pass from Joe Burrow (Evan McPherson kick), 13:33. Bengals 14–3. **Drive: 9 plays, 74 yards, 5:23.**
- KC – Jerick McKinnon 2-yard pass from Patrick Mahomes (Harrison Butker kick), 2:23. Bengals 14–10. **Drive: 14 plays, 81 yards, 7:05.**

**Third quarter**

- KC – Isiah Pacheco 8-yard run (Harrison Butker kick), 12:03. Chiefs 17–14. **Drive: 7 plays, 77 yards, 2:57.**
- CIN – Evan McPherson 36-yard field goal, 7:16. Tied 17–17. **Drive: 9 plays, 57 yards, 4:47.**
- KC – Patrick Mahomes 3-yard run (Harrison Butker kick), 3:49. Chiefs 24–17. **Drive: 8 plays, 53 yards, 3:27.**

**Fourth quarter**

- CIN – Evan McPherson 41-yard field goal, 14:47. Chiefs 24–20. **Drive: 8 plays, 52 yards, 4:02.**
- CIN – Chris Evans 8-yard pass from Joe Burrow (Evan McPherson kick), 8:54. Bengals 27–24. **Drive: 10 plays, 53 yards, 4:58.**

**Top passers**

- KC – Patrick Mahomes – 16/27, 223 yards, TD
- CIN – Joe Burrow – 25/31, 286 yards, 2 TD

**Top rushers**

- KC – Isiah Pacheco – 14 rushes, 66 yards, TD
- CIN – Samaje Perine – 21 rushes, 106 yards

**Top receivers**

- KC – Marquez Valdes-Scantling – 2 receptions, 71 yards
- CIN – Ja'Marr Chase – 7 receptions, 97 yards

The Chiefs traveled to Cincinnati to take on the 7–4 Bengals. After leading 14–10 at halftime, the Chiefs took a 17–14 lead in the third quarter by way of Isiah Pacheco's 8-yard touchdown run. The Bengals then tied it up at 17–17 when Evan McPherson kicked a 36-yard field goal. Patrick Mahomes then ran for a 3-yard touchdown to put the Chiefs back on top 24–17. The Bengals scored the remaining points in the fourth quarter with McPherson's 41-yard field goal, making it 24–20 and taking the lead with Joe Burrow's 8-yard touchdown pass to Chris Evans. After a missed 55-yard field goal by Harrison Butker, the Bengals faced 3rd and 11. The Bengals converted, making the final score 27–24.

The Chiefs fell to 9–3 with the upset loss, and extended their losing streak in Cincinnati against the Bengals to seven games. Patrick Mahomes' personal starting record against Joe Burrow fell to 0–3.

==== Week 14: at Denver Broncos ====
Week 14: Kansas City Chiefs at Denver Broncos – Game summary

Quarter	1	2	3	4	Total
**Chiefs**	6	21	7	0	**34**
Broncos	0	14	7	7	**28**

at Empower Field at Mile High, Denver, Colorado

- Date: December 11
- Game time: 3:05 p.m. CST/2:05 p.m. MST
- Game weather: Sunny, 62 °F (17 °C)
- Game attendance: 76,072
- Referee: Craig Wrolstad
- TV announcers (CBS): Ian Eagle, Charles Davis and Evan Washburn
- Recap, Game Book

Game information

**First quarter**

- KC – Harrison Butker 35-yard field goal, 10:56. Chiefs 3–0. **Drive: 8 plays, 58 yards, 4:04.**
- KC – Harrison Butker 45-yard field goal, 2:53. Chiefs 6–0. **Drive: 6 plays, 53 yards, 2:18.**

**Second quarter**

- KC – Jerick McKinnon 56-yard pass from Patrick Mahomes (Harrison Butker kick), 14:16. Chiefs 13–0. **Drive: 4 plays, 78 yards, 1:41.**
- KC – Jerick McKinnon 10-yard pass from Patrick Mahomes (Harrison Butker kick), 7:16. Chiefs 20–0. **Drive: 12 plays, 76 yards, 4:53.**
- KC – Willie Gay 47-yard interception return (Harrison Butker kick), 4:32. Chiefs 27–0.
- DEN – Jerry Jeudy 18-yard pass from Russell Wilson (Brandon McManus kick), 1:35. Chiefs 27–7. **Drive: 4 plays, 42 yards, 1:18.**
- DEN – Jerry Jeudy 5-yard pass from Russell Wilson (Brandon McManus kick), 0:09. Chiefs 27–14. **Drive: 7 plays, 60 yards, 0:57.**

**Third quarter**

- DEN – Marlon Mack 66-yard pass from Russell Wilson (Brandon McManus kick), 13:03. Chiefs 27–21. **Drive: 5 plays, 75 yards, 1:57.**
- KC – JuJu Smith-Schuster 4-yard pass from Patrick Mahomes (Harrison Butker kick), 0:38. Chiefs 34–21. **Drive: 9 plays, 72 yards, 4:28.**

**Fourth quarter**

- DEN – Jerry Jeudy 7-yard pass from Brett Rypien (Brandon McManus kick), 10:49. Chiefs 34–28. **Drive: 12 plays, 75 yards, 4:49.**

**Top passers**

- KC – Patrick Mahomes – 28/42, 352 yards, 3 TD, 3 INT
- DEN – Russell Wilson – 23/36, 247 yards, 3 TD, INT

**Top rushers**

- KC – Isiah Pacheco – 13 rushes, 70 yards
- DEN – Russell Wilson – 4 rushes, 57 yards

**Top receivers**

- KC – Jerick McKinnon – 7 receptions, 112 yards, 2 TD
- DEN – Jerry Jeudy – 8 receptions, 73 yards, 3 TD

==== Week 15: at Houston Texans ====
Week 15: Kansas City Chiefs at Houston Texans – Game summary

Quarter	1	2	3	4	OT	Total
**Chiefs**	0	13	3	8	6	**30**
Texans	7	7	7	3	0	**24**

at NRG Stadium, Houston, Texas

- Date: December 18
- Game time: 12:00 p.m. CST
- Game weather: None (retractable roof closed)
- Game attendance: 70,541
- Referee: Carl Cheffers
- TV announcers (CBS): Kevin Harlan, Trent Green and Melanie Collins
- Recap, Game Book

Game information

**First quarter**

- HOU – Teagan Quitoriano 8-yard pass from Davis Mills (Kaʻimi Fairbairn kick), 1:01. Texans 7–0. **Drive: 11 plays, 80 yards, 5:42.**

**Second quarter**

- KC – Jerick McKinnon 20-yard pass from Patrick Mahomes (Harrison Butker kick), 12:27. Tied 7–7. **Drive: 7 plays, 75 yards, 3:34.**
- HOU – Davis Mills 17-yard run (Kaʻimi Fairbairn kick), 9:19. Texans 14–7. **Drive: 2 plays, 17 yards, 0:12.**
- KC – Marquez Valdes-Scantling 4-yard pass from Patrick Mahomes (kick failed, wide left), 0:14. Texans 14–13. **Drive: 13 plays, 97 yards, 3:52.**

**Third quarter**

- KC – Harrison Butker 27-yard field goal, 9:05. Chiefs 16–14. **Drive: 10 plays, 67 yards, 5:55.**
- HOU – Jordan Akins 12-yard pass from Davis Mills (Kaʻimi Fairbairn kick), 1:25. Texans 21–16. **Drive: 7 plays, 49 yards, 4:18.**

**Fourth quarter**

- KC – Patrick Mahomes 5-yard run (Patrick Mahomes–Jerick McKinnon pass), 11:57. Chiefs 24–21. **Drive: 9 plays, 84 yards, 4:28.**
- HOU – Kaʻimi Fairbairn 29-yard field goal, 5:11. Tied 24–24. **Drive: 15 plays, 65 yards, 6:46.**

**Overtime**

- KC – Jerick McKinnon 26-yard run, 5:13. Chiefs 30–24. **Drive: 1 play, 26 yards, 0:06.**

**Top passers**

- KC – Patrick Mahomes – 36/41, 336 yards, 2 TD
- HOU – Davis Mills – 12/24, 121 yards, 2 TD

**Top rushers**

- KC – Isiah Pacheco – 15 rushes, 86 yards
- HOU – Royce Freeman – 11 rushes, 51 yards

**Top receivers**

- KC – Travis Kelce – 10 receptions, 105 yards
- HOU – Chris Moore – 4 receptions, 42 yards

==== Week 16: vs. Seattle Seahawks ====
Week 16: Seattle Seahawks at Kansas City Chiefs – Game summary

Quarter	1	2	3	4	Total
Seahawks	0	3	0	7	**10**
**Chiefs**	7	10	0	7	**24**

at Arrowhead Stadium, Kansas City, Missouri

- Date: December 24
- Game time: 12:00 p.m. CST
- Game weather: 12 °F (−11 °C)
- Game attendance: 73,331
- Referee: Clete Blakeman
- TV announcers (Fox): Kevin Kugler, Mark Sanchez and Laura Okmin
- Recap, Game Book

Game information

**First quarter**

- KC – Kadarius Toney 8-yard pass from Patrick Mahomes (Harrison Butker kick), 6:41. Chiefs 7–0. **Drive: 9 plays, 63 yards, 5:12.**

**Second quarter**

- KC – Jerick McKinnon 9-yard pass from Patrick Mahomes (Harrison Butker kick), 8:56. Chiefs 14–0. **Drive: 7 plays, 53 yards, 3:21.**
- KC – Harrison Butker 47-yard field goal, 2:40. Chiefs 17–0. **Drive: 6 plays, 43 yards, 2:48.**
- SEA – Jason Myers 22-yard field goal, 0:00. Chiefs 17–3. **Drive: 11 plays, 90 yards, 2:40.**

**Third quarter**

- No scoring plays.

**Fourth quarter**

- KC – Patrick Mahomes 3-yard run (Harrison Butker kick), 4:42. Chiefs 24–3. **Drive: 5 plays, 80 yards, 3:00.**
- SEA – Noah Fant 6-yard pass from Geno Smith (Jason Myers kick), 2:25. Chiefs 24–10. **Drive: 10 plays, 75 yards, 2:17.**

**Top passers**

- SEA – Geno Smith – 25/40, 215 yards, TD, INT
- KC – Patrick Mahomes – 16/28, 224 yards, 2 TD

**Top rushers**

- SEA – Kenneth Walker III – 26 rushes, 107 yards
- KC – Isiah Pacheco – 14 rushes, 58 yards

**Top receivers**

- SEA – DK Metcalf – 7 receptions, 81 yards
- KC – Travis Kelce – 6 receptions, 113 yards

==== Week 17: vs. Denver Broncos ====
Week 17: Denver Broncos at Kansas City Chiefs – Game summary

Quarter	1	2	3	4	Total
Broncos	0	10	7	7	**24**
**Chiefs**	6	7	0	14	**27**

at Arrowhead Stadium, Kansas City, Missouri

- Date: January 1
- Game time: 12:00 p.m. CST
- Game weather: 53 °F (12 °C)
- Game attendance: 73,571
- Referee: Tra Blake
- TV announcers (CBS): Greg Gumbel, Adam Archuleta and AJ Ross
- Recap, Game Book

Game information

**First quarter**

- KC – Isiah Pacheco 5-yard run (run failed), 7:35. Chiefs 6–0. **Drive: 10 plays, 65 yards, 5:42.**

**Second quarter**

- DEN – Brandon McManus 49-yard field goal, 10:46. Chiefs 6–3. **Drive: 14 plays, 49 yards, 6:46.**
- DEN – Russell Wilson 16-yard run (Brandon McManus kick), 4:40. Broncos 10–6. **Drive: 1 plays, 16 yards, 0:05.**
- KC – Jerick McKinnon 6-yard pass from Patrick Mahomes (Harrison Butker kick), 1:02. Chiefs 13–10. **Drive: 7 plays, 75 yards, 3:38.**

**Third quarter**

- DEN – Albert Okwuegbunam 25-yard pass from Russell Wilson (Brandon McManus kick), 6:35. Broncos 17–13. **Drive: 6 plays, 63 yards, 3:48.**

**Fourth quarter**

- KC – Blake Bell 17-yard pass from Patrick Mahomes (Harrison Butker kick), 14:50. Chiefs 20–17. **Drive: 6 plays, 65 yards, 3:06.**
- KC – Jerick McKinnon 3-yard pass from Patrick Mahomes (Harrison Butker kick), 12:36. Chiefs 27–17. **Drive: 4 plays, 17 yards, 1:55.**
- DEN – Russell Wilson 4-yard run (Brandon McManus kick), 6:14. Chiefs 27–24. **Drive: 12 plays, 75 yards, 6:22.**

**Top passers**

- DEN – Russell Wilson – 26/38, 222 yards, TD, INT
- KC – Patrick Mahomes – 29/42, 328 yards, 3 TD, INT

**Top rushers**

- DEN – Latavius Murray – 12 rushes, 56 yards
- KC – Isiah Pacheco – 9 rushes, 31 yards, TD

**Top receivers**

- DEN – Albert Okwuegbunam – 3 receptions, 45 yards, TD
- KC – Kadarius Toney – 4 receptions, 71 yards

==== Week 18: at Las Vegas Raiders ====
Week 18: Kansas City Chiefs at Las Vegas Raiders – Game summary

Quarter	1	2	3	4	Total
**Chiefs**	7	17	0	7	**31**
Raiders	3	0	3	7	**13**

at Allegiant Stadium, Paradise, Nevada

- Date: January 7
- Game time: 3:30 p.m. CST/1:30 p.m. PST
- Game weather: None (indoor stadium)
- Game attendance: 62,136
- Referee: Scott Novak
- TV announcers (ESPN/ABC): Steve Levy, Louis Riddick, Dan Orlovsky and Laura Rutledge
- Recap, Game Book

Game information

**First quarter**

- KC – Jerick McKinnon 2-yard pass from Patrick Mahomes (Harrison Butker kick), 12:52. Chiefs 7–0. **Drive: 5 plays, 75 yards, 2:08.**
- LV – Daniel Carlson 54-yard field goal, 7:15. Chiefs 7–3. **Drive: 10 plays, 40 yards, 5:37.**

**Second quarter**

- KC – Ronald Jones II 2-yard run (Harrison Butker kick), 14:56. Chiefs 14–3. **Drive: 3 plays, 44 yards, 1:08.**
- KC – Kadarius Toney 11-yard run (Harrison Butker kick), 0:47. Chiefs 21–3. **Drive: 12 plays, 98 yards, 5:19.**
- KC – Harrison Butker 44-yard field goal, 0:00. Chiefs 24–3. **Drive: 2 plays, 4 yards, 0:09.**

**Third quarter**

- LV – Daniel Carlson 38-yard field goal, 6:55. Chiefs 24–6. **Drive: 13 plays, 55 yards, 8:06.**

**Fourth quarter**

- KC – Isiah Pacheco 1-yard run (Harrison Butker kick), 11:03. Chiefs 31–6. **Drive: 7 plays, 62 yards, 3:01.**
- LV – Hunter Renfrow 11-yard pass from Jarrett Stidham (Daniel Carlson kick), 6:37. Chiefs 31–13. **Drive: 10 plays, 75 yards, 4:26.**

**Top passers**

- KC – Patrick Mahomes – 18/26, 202 yards, TD
- LV – Jarrett Stidham – 22/36, 219 yards, TD, INT

**Top rushers**

- KC – Isiah Pacheco – 8 rushes, 64 yards, TD
- LV – Jarrett Stidham – 7 rushes, 50 yards

**Top receivers**

- KC – Justin Watson – 1 reception, 67 yards
- LV – Davante Adams – 5 receptions, 73 yards

=== Standings ===
==== Division ====
AFC West
	W	L	T	PCT	DIV	CONF	PF	PA	STK
^{(1)} Kansas City Chiefs	14	3	0	.824	6–0	9–3	496	369	W5
^{(5)} Los Angeles Chargers	10	7	0	.588	2–4	7–5	391	384	L1
Las Vegas Raiders	6	11	0	.353	3–3	5–7	395	418	L3
Denver Broncos	5	12	0	.294	1–5	3–9	287	359	W1

==== Conference ====
AFC
#	Team	Division	W	L	T	PCT	DIV	CONF	SOS	SOV	STK
**Division leaders**
1	Kansas City Chiefs	West	14	3	0	.824	6–0	9–3	.453	.422	W5
2	Buffalo Bills	East	13	3	0	.813	4–2	9–2	.489	.471	W7
3	Cincinnati Bengals	North	12	4	0	.750	3–3	8–3	.507	.490	W8
4	Jacksonville Jaguars	South	9	8	0	.529	4–2	8–4	.467	.438	W5
**Wild cards**
5 (Note: LA Chargers claimed the No. 5 seed over Baltimore based on conference record (7–5 vs. 6–6).)	Los Angeles Chargers	West	10	7	0	.588	2–4	7–5	.443	.341	L1
6	Baltimore Ravens	North	10	7	0	.588	3–3	6–6	.509	.456	L2
7 (Note: Miami finished ahead of Pittsburgh based on head-to-head victory, claiming the 7th and final playoff spot.)	Miami Dolphins	East	9	8	0	.529	3–3	7–5	.537	.457	W1
**Did not qualify for the postseason**
8	Pittsburgh Steelers	North	9	8	0	.529	3–3	5–7	.519	.451	W4
9	New England Patriots	East	8	9	0	.471	3–3	6–6	.502	.415	L1
10 (Note: NY Jets and Tennessee finished ahead of Cleveland based on conference record (5–7 vs. 4–8).) (Note: NY Jets finished ahead of Tennessee based on common record (3–3 vs. 2–4 against: Buffalo, Cincinnati, Denver, Green Bay, Jacksonville).)	New York Jets	East	7	10	0	.412	2–4	5–7	.538	.458	L6
11	Tennessee Titans	South	7	10	0	.412	3–3	5–7	.509	.336	L7
12	Cleveland Browns	North	7	10	0	.412	3–3	4–8	.524	.492	L1
13	Las Vegas Raiders	West	6	11	0	.353	3–3	5–7	.474	.397	L3
14	Denver Broncos	West	5	12	0	.294	1–5	3–9	.481	.465	W1
15	Indianapolis Colts	South	4	12	1	.265	1–4–1	4–7–1	.512	.500	L7
16	Houston Texans	South	3	13	1	.206	3–2–1	3–8–1	.481	.402	W1
**Tiebreakers** (Note: When breaking ties for three or more teams under the NFL's rules, they are first broken within divisions, then comparing only the highest ranked remaining team from each division.)

== Postseason ==
=== Schedule ===
Round	Date	Opponent (seed)	Result	Record	Venue	Recap
Wild Card	First-round bye					
Divisional	January 21	Jacksonville Jaguars (4)	W 27–20	1–0	Arrowhead Stadium	Recap
AFC Championship	January 29	Cincinnati Bengals (3)	W 23–20	2–0	Arrowhead Stadium	Recap
Super Bowl LVII	February 12	vs. Philadelphia Eagles (N1)	W 38–35	3–0	State Farm Stadium	Recap

=== Game summaries ===
==== AFC Divisional Playoffs: vs. (4) Jacksonville Jaguars ====
AFC Divisional Playoffs: (4) Jacksonville Jaguars at (1) Kansas City Chiefs – Game summary

Quarter	1	2	3	4	Total
Jaguars	7	3	0	10	20
Chiefs	7	10	3	7	27

at Arrowhead Stadium, Kansas City, Missouri

- Date: January 21, 2023
- Game time: 3:35 p.m. CST
- Game weather: 37 °F (3 °C)
- Game attendance: 73,220
- Referee: Shawn Hochuli
- TV announcers (NBC): Mike Tirico, Cris Collinsworth and Melissa Stark
- Recap, Game Book

Game information

First quarter

- KC – Travis Kelce 8-yard pass from Patrick Mahomes (Harrison Butker kick), 7:56. Chiefs 7–0. Drive: 12 plays, 83 yards, 6:00.
- JAX – Christian Kirk 10-yard pass from Trevor Lawrence (Riley Patterson kick), 5:04. Tied 7–7. Drive: 5 plays, 39 yards, 2:52.

Second quarter

- KC – Harrison Butker 50-yard field goal, 14:09. Chiefs 10–7. Drive: 11 plays, 43 yards, 5:55.
- KC – Travis Kelce 1-yard pass from Chad Henne (Harrison Butker kick), 3:54. Chiefs 17–7. Drive: 12 plays, 98 yards, 6:05.
- JAX – Riley Patterson 41-yard field goal, 0:27. Chiefs 17–10. Drive: 11 plays, 52 yards, 3:27.

Third quarter

- KC – Harrison Butker 50-yard field goal, 0:08. Chiefs 20–10. Drive: 5 plays, 29 yards, 2:17.

Fourth quarter

- JAX – Travis Etienne 4-yard run (Riley Patterson kick), 11:49. Chiefs 20–17. Drive: 7 plays, 75 yards, 3:19.
- KC – Marquez Valdes-Scantling 6-yard pass from Patrick Mahomes (Harrison Butker kick), 7:08. Chiefs 27–17. Drive: 10 plays, 75 yards, 4:41.
- JAX – Riley Patterson 48-yard field goal, 0:25. Chiefs 27–20. Drive: 6 plays, 37 yards, 0:39.

Top passers

- JAX – Trevor Lawrence – 24/39, 217 yards, TD, INT
- KC – Patrick Mahomes – 22/30, 195 yards, 2 TD

Top rushers

- JAX – Travis Etienne – 10 rushes, 62 yards, TD
- KC – Isiah Pacheco – 12 rushes, 95 yards

Top receivers

- JAX – Zay Jones – 5 receptions, 83 yards
- KC – Travis Kelce – 14 receptions, 98 yards, 2 TD

With the win, the Chiefs advance to the AFC Championship Game against the Cincinnati Bengals.

==== AFC Championship: vs. (3) Cincinnati Bengals ====
AFC Championship: (3) Cincinnati Bengals at (1) Kansas City Chiefs – Game summary

Quarter	1	2	3	4	Total
Bengals	0	6	7	7	20
Chiefs	3	10	7	3	23

at Arrowhead Stadium, Kansas City, Missouri

- Date: January 29, 2023
- Game time: 5:40 p.m. CST
- Game weather: 22 °F (−6 °C)
- Game attendance: 73,426
- Referee: Ronald Torbert
- TV announcers (CBS): Jim Nantz, Tony Romo, Tracy Wolfson and Jay Feely
- Recap, Game Book

Game information

First quarter

- KC – Harrison Butker 43-yard field goal, 8:50. Chiefs 3–0. Drive: 7 plays, 39 yards, 3:21.

Second quarter

- KC – Harrison Butker 24-yard field goal, 8:59. Chiefs 6–0. Drive: 12 plays, 61 yards, 6:18.
- CIN – Evan McPherson 30-yard field goal, 6:22. Chiefs 6–3. Drive: 13 plays, 63 yards, 6:22.
- KC – Travis Kelce 14-yard pass from Patrick Mahomes (Harrison Butker kick), 3:53. Chiefs 13–3. Drive: 8 plays, 75 yards, 4:43.
- CIN – Evan McPherson 23-yard field goal, 0:00. Chiefs 13–6. Drive: 12 plays, 90 yards, 2:03.

Third quarter

- CIN – Tee Higgins 27-yard pass from Joe Burrow (Evan McPherson kick), 9:54. Tied 13–13. Drive: 8 plays, 62 yards, 3:35.
- KC – Marquez Valdes-Scantling 19-yard pass from Patrick Mahomes (Harrison Butker kick), 4:15. Chiefs 20–13. Drive: 11 plays, 77 yards, 5:39.

Fourth quarter

- CIN – Samaje Perine 2-yard run (Evan McPherson kick), 13:30. Tied 20–20. Drive: 6 plays, 45 yards, 2:25.
- KC – Harrison Butker 45-yard field goal, 0:03. Chiefs 23–20. Drive: 4 plays, 26 yards, 0:27.

Top passers

- CIN – Joe Burrow – 26/41, 270 yards, TD, 2 INT
- KC – Patrick Mahomes – 29/43, 326 yards, 2 TD

Top rushers

- CIN – Joe Burrow – 4 rushes, 30 yards
- KC – Isiah Pacheco – 10 rushes, 26 yards

Top receivers

- CIN – Tee Higgins – 6 receptions, 83 yards, TD
- KC – Marquez Valdes-Scantling – 6 receptions, 116 yards, TD

With the win, the Chiefs advance to Super Bowl LVII against the Philadelphia Eagles.

==== Super Bowl LVII: vs. (N1) Philadelphia Eagles ====
Super Bowl LVII: (A1) Kansas City Chiefs vs. (N1) Philadelphia Eagles – Game summary

Quarter	1	2	3	4	Total
Chiefs	7	7	7	17	38
Eagles	7	17	3	8	35

at State Farm Stadium, Glendale, Arizona

- Date: February 12, 2023
- Game time: 4:30 p.m. MST
- Game weather: Sunny, 77 °F (25 °C) (retractable roof open)
- Game attendance: 67,827
- Referee: Carl Cheffers
- TV announcers (Fox): Kevin Burkhardt, Greg Olsen, Erin Andrews, and Tom Rinaldi
- Recap, Game Book

Game information

First quarter

- PHI – Jalen Hurts 1-yard run (Jake Elliott kick), 10:09. Eagles 7–0. Drive: 11 plays, 75 yards, 4:51.
- KC – Travis Kelce 18-yard pass from Patrick Mahomes (Harrison Butker kick), 6:57. Tied 7–7. Drive: 6 plays, 75 yards, 3:12.

Second quarter

- PHI – A. J. Brown 45-yard pass from Jalen Hurts (Jake Elliott kick), 14:52. Eagles 14–7. Drive: 5 plays, 68 yards, 2:32.
- KC – Nick Bolton 36-yard fumble return (Harrison Butker kick), 9:39. Tied 14–14.
- PHI – Jalen Hurts 4-yard run (Jake Elliott kick), 2:20. Eagles 21–14. Drive: 12 plays, 75 yards, 7:19.
- PHI – Jake Elliott 35-yard field goal, 0:00. Eagles 24–14. Drive: 8 plays, 40 yards, 1:22.

Third quarter

- KC – Isiah Pacheco 1-yard run (Harrison Butker kick), 9:30. Eagles 24–21. Drive: 10 plays, 75 yards, 5:30.
- PHI – Jake Elliott 33-yard field goal, 1:45. Eagles 27–21. Drive: 17 plays, 60 yards, 7:45.

Fourth quarter

- KC – Kadarius Toney 5-yard pass from Patrick Mahomes (Harrison Butker kick), 12:04. Chiefs 28–27. Drive: 9 plays, 75 yards, 4:41.
- KC – Skyy Moore 4-yard pass from Patrick Mahomes (Harrison Butker kick), 9:22. Chiefs 35–27. Drive: 3 plays, 5 yards, 0:49.
- PHI – Jalen Hurts 2-yard run (Jalen Hurts run), 5:15. Tied 35–35. Drive: 8 plays, 75 yards, 4:07.
- KC – Harrison Butker 27-yard field goal, 0:08. Chiefs 38–35. Drive: 12 plays, 66 yards, 5:07.

Top passers

- KC – Patrick Mahomes – 21/27, 182 yards, 3 TD
- PHI – Jalen Hurts – 27/38, 304 yards, TD

Top rushers

- KC – Isiah Pacheco – 15 rushes, 76 yards, TD
- PHI – Jalen Hurts – 15 rushes, 70 yards, 3 TD

Top receivers

- KC – Travis Kelce – 6 receptions, 81 yards, TD
- PHI – DeVonta Smith – 7 receptions, 100 yards
