= Matt Bushman =

American football player (born 1995)

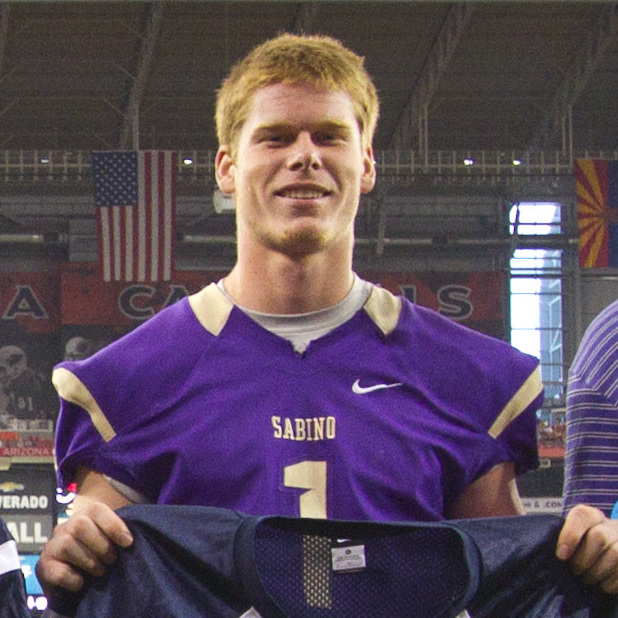
- Bushman in 2013

No. 84, 89
- Position: Tight end

Personal information
- Born: November 3, 1995 (age 31); Carbondale, Illinois, U.S.
- Listed height: 6 ft 5 in (1.96 m)
- Listed weight: 245 lb (111 kg)

Career information
- High school: Sabino (Tucson, Arizona)
- College: BYU (2017–2020)
- NFL draft: 2021: undrafted

Career history
- Las Vegas Raiders (2021); Kansas City Chiefs (2021–2023)

Awards and highlights
- 2× Super Bowl champion (LVII, LVIII); 2× First-team All-Independent (2018–2019)

Career NFL statistics
- Games played: 3
- Stats at Pro Football Reference

Matt Bushman (born November 3, 1995) is an American former professional football player who was a tight end in the National Football League (NFL) from 2021 to 2023. He played high school football at Sabino High School in Tucson, Arizona, where he led the country in receiving yards by a tight end his senior year with 1,583 yards and 26 touchdowns. After serving as a Mormon missionary in Chile from 2014 to 2016, Bushman played college football for the BYU Cougars from 2017 to 2020. While at BYU, he was a freshman All-American, led the team in receiving yards for three straight seasons, and was a two-time Phil Steele All-Independent first team selection. He missed the entire 2020 season due to injury.

Bushman signed with the Las Vegas Raiders after going undrafted in the 2021 NFL draft. He played in two games for the Raiders in 2021 as a practice squad elevation. He was then a member of the Kansas City Chiefs' practice squad from 2021 to 2023, appearing in one game as a practice squad elevation. Bushman was a member of two Super Bowl-winning teams during his time with the Chiefs.

== Early life ==
Matt Bushman was born on November 3, 1995, in Carbondale, Illinois. He grew up in New Orleans, Louisiana. In 2005, when Bushman was in fourth grade, the family's home was damaged by Hurricane Katrina. The family then moved to Tucson, Arizona, to live with Bushman's grandparents. He played high school football at Sabino High School in Tucson, earning all-state honors twice. He led the country in receiving yards by a tight end his senior year in 2013, with 1,583 yards and 26 touchdowns. Bushman recorded high school totals of 2,891 receiving yards and 42 touchdowns. He was named an honorable mention Parade All-American and an honorable mention Semper Fidelis All-American. He earned all-state honors in baseball during high school as well and had a batting average of over .400. Bushman was also an Eagle Scout growing up.

In the class of 2014, Bushman was rated a three-star recruit, the No. 14 tight end in the country, and the No. 13 overall player in Arizona by ESPN.com, a three-star recruit, the No. 35 tight end in the country, and the No. 17 overall player in Arizona by 247Sports.com, and a three-star recruit by Scout.com. In October 2013, he committed to play college football and baseball for the BYU Cougars of Brigham Young University. He had also received offers from Utah, Arizona, Colorado, Colorado State, Duke, and San Diego State.

== College career ==
Bushman served as a Mormon missionary for The Church of Jesus Christ of Latter-day Saints at the Chile Santiago South Mission in Santiago, Chile from September 2014 to September 2016. He was 6'5" and 230 pounds when he returned from Chile. He joined the BYU Cougars football team in 2017. Bushman impressed local media with his performance at 2017 spring camp, catching four passes for 105 yards and two touchdowns in the rain during a scrimmage. BYU quarterback Tanner Mangum stated that "Matt has been a great addition to our team and he's worked hard to be a legitimate target for us." Following spring camp, he was a member of the BYU Cougars baseball team during the 2017 season as a backup infielder. However, he only appeared in one game, striking out as a pinch hitter in his only at-bat and then spending time in right field.

He played in all 13 games, starting eight, as a true freshman during the 2017 football season, catching 49 passes for 520 yards and three touchdowns. He led the team in receptions and receiving yards while tying for the team-lead in receiving touchdowns. Bushman also led the NCAA Division I Football Bowl Subdivision (FBS) in receptions and receiving yards by a freshman tight end. He was named a freshman All-American by USA Today Sports, the Football Writers Association of America, 247Sports and Chat Sports. His receptions and yards were the most by a BYU tight end since Dennis Pitta in 2009. Bushman received BYU's Impact Player of the Year Award.

In July 2018, Bushman was named to the watchlist for the John Mackey Award, given to college football's best tight end. He played in all 13 games, starting eight, for the second consecutive season in 2018, recording 29 receptions for 511 yards and two touchdowns while earning Phil Steele All-Independent first team honors. He led the team in receptions and receiving yards for the second straight year. Bushman's 17.6 yards per catch was the best by an independent school player that season and also the best for any FBS tight end.

In July 2019, Bushman was named to the watchlists for both the John Mackey Award and the Walter Camp Award, given to the best player in college football. Bushman and Jared Pinkney were the only two tight ends on the Walter Camp Award watchlist. He was named the John Mackey Tight End of the Week after totaling five receptions for a career-high 101 yards and a career-high two touchdowns in a 28–25 upset victory over No. 14 Boise State on October 19. He appeared in all 13 games, starting 11, in 2019, catching 47 passes for 688 yards and four touchdowns. He led the team in receiving yards for the third straight season and also tied for the team-lead in receiving touchdowns. He was also named to the Phil Steele All-Independent first team for the second consecutive season. Bushman became the third BYU tight end, after Gordon Hudson and Dennis Pitta, to record over 500 receiving yards for three straight years.

In July 2020, Bushman was named to the John Mackey Award watchlist for the third season in a row. However, he ended up missing the entire 2020 season after suffering a ruptured Achilles tendon during practice on August 31, 2020. He was a team captain his senior year. Although he still had a year of eligibility remaining due to the COVID-19 pandemic, Bushman decided to enter the 2021 NFL draft. He played in 39 games overall, starting 27, during his college career, compiling 125 receptions for 1,719 yards and nine touchdowns. He spent the 2020 season rehabbing his Achilles in Provo, Utah and graduated from BYU in December 2020. Afterward, Bushman began training at EXOS Physical Therapy and Sports Medicine in Scottsdale, Arizona.

== Professional career ==
=== Pre-draft ===
The Deseret News reported that Bushman looked fully recovered during BYU's pro day on March 26, 2021. Bushman was rated the 249th best prospect in the 2021 NFL draft by Scouts Inc. Lance Zierlein of NFL.com stated "He has good yards-per-catch numbers and quality ball skills, but is unable to separate against tight man coverage and struggles to finish contested catches. He's a poor blocker at the point of attack." Bushman was rated a priority undrafted free agent by NFL.com. Prior to the draft, he said that he had been contacted multiple times by both the Pittsburgh Steelers and Las Vegas Raiders, and that he had an upcoming medical screening with the Raiders.

Pre-draft measurables
Height	Weight	Arm length	Hand span	20-yard shuttle	Three-cone drill	Vertical jump	Bench press
6 ft 4 5/8 in (1.95 m)	245 lb (111 kg)	32 5/8 in (0.83 m)	9 3/8 in (0.24 m)	4.53 s	7.13 s	32.5 in (0.83 m)	23 reps
All values from NFL Combine/Pro Day

=== Las Vegas Raiders ===
After going unselected in the 2021 NFL draft, Bushman signed with the Las Vegas Raiders on May 7, 2021. Bushman was waived on August 31 but signed to the practice squad the next day. On October 23, he was elevated to the active roster after Nick Bowers was placed on injured reserve. He made his NFL debut on October 24, playing 11 snaps on offense and two snaps on special teams in a 33–22 win over the Philadelphia Eagles. He reverted to the practice squad after the game. Bushman was promoted to the active roster for the second time on December 4 after Darren Waller was ruled out for the December 5 game against the Washington Football Team. Bushman appeared in eight snaps on special teams during that contest and reverted to the practice squad afterwards. After a series of injuries in the Raiders' secondary, Bushman was released on December 23, 2021, so the Raiders could sign defensive back Tony Brown to the practice squad.

=== Kansas City Chiefs ===
After a visit, Bushman signed with the Kansas City Chiefs on January 4, 2022, joining Nakia Griffin-Stewart and Mark Vital as the third tight end on the practice squad. Bushman signed a reserve/future contract with the Chiefs on February 2, 2022. Bushman sustained a fractured clavicle in the Chiefs' preseason game against the Green Bay Packers on August 25, 2022, a game in which he recorded three receptions for 73 yards and two touchdowns prior to being injured. He was waived on August 30 with an injury designation. He cleared waivers and was placed on the Chiefs' injured reserve the next day. On September 7, he was released with an injury settlement. Bushman was re-signed to the practice squad on December 20, 2022, after injuries to Chiefs tight ends Jody Fortson and Noah Gray. Bushman became a Super Bowl champion when the Chiefs defeated the Philadelphia Eagles in Super Bowl LVII. He signed a reserve/future contract on February 15, 2023.

Bushman was waived by the Chiefs on August 29, 2023, and then re-signed to the practice squad the next day. On September 7, just hours before kickoff, Bushman was elevated to the active roster after Travis Kelce was questionable for the day's season-opening game against the Detroit Lions. Bushman played seven snaps on offense in the 21–20 loss to the Lions. He reverted to the practice squad after the game. Bushman won his second straight Super Bowl when the Chiefs defeated the San Francisco 49ers in Super Bowl LVIII. He became a free agent after the season and was not re-signed by the Chiefs. In April 2024, Bushman said he was "moving away" from the NFL unless a "great opportunity presents itself".

== Personal life ==
Bushman majored in business at BYU. While in college, he married Emily Lewis, a former BYU volleyball player and the daughter of NFL tight end Chad Lewis. As of 2024, Matt and Emily had two kids and are expecting another. Bushman's mother Shannon played volleyball at Ricks College, sister Madeline played volleyball at Dixie State, brother Riley and uncles David, Quinn and Scott Gooch played football at BYU, and uncle Douglas played basketball at Utah. He started the Matt Bushman Foundation in January 2021 in order to give underprivileged kids athletic equipment and sports opportunities.
