= Oginni =

Ọ̀gínní
- Gender: Male
- Language: Yoruba

Origin
- Origin: Nigerian
- Meaning: A fashionable person.
- Region of origin: South West, Nigeria

Ọ̀gínní is a Nigerian surname of Yoruba origin, typically bestowed upon males. It means "A fashionable person". The name Ọ̀gínní is common among the Ijesha people of the Southwest, Nigeria. Oginni can also mean greatness and common surname among people from Iduani from South West, Nigeria.

== Notable individuals with the name ==
- Kehinde Oginni (born 1999), Nigerian gridiron football player
- Tolulope Oginni, Nigerian businessman
- Tolulope Oginni, Researcher on air sea interaction
