= Justin Watson (wide receiver) =

American football player (born 1996)

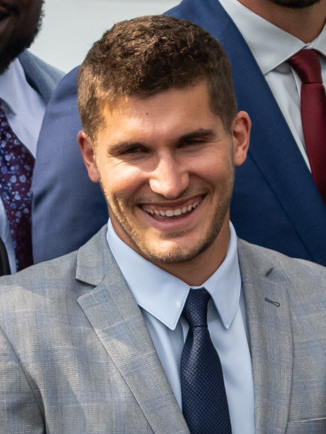
- Watson at the White House in 2023

No. 84 – Kansas City Chiefs
- Position: Wide receiver
- Roster status: Active

Personal information
- Born: April 4, 1996 (age 30); Bridgeville, Pennsylvania, U.S.
- Listed height: 6 ft 2 in (1.88 m)
- Listed weight: 215 lb (98 kg)

Career information
- High school: South Fayette (PA)
- College: Penn (2014–2017)
- NFL draft: 2018: 5th round, 144th overall pick

Career history
- Tampa Bay Buccaneers (2018–2021); Kansas City Chiefs (2022–2024); Houston Texans (2025); Kansas City Chiefs (2026–present)

Awards and highlights
- 3× Super Bowl champion (LV, LVII, LVIII); 3× First-team All-Ivy League (2015, 2016, 2017); Third-team FCS All-American (2017)

Career NFL statistics as of 2026
- Receptions: 90
- Receiving yards: 1,352
- Receiving touchdowns: 9
- Stats at Pro Football Reference

Justin Howard Watson (born April 4, 1996) is an American professional football wide receiver for the Kansas City Chiefs of the National Football League (NFL). He played college football for the Penn Quakers and was selected by the Tampa Bay Buccaneers in the fifth round of the 2018 NFL draft. Watson is a three-time Super Bowl champion, winning Super Bowl LV with the Buccaneers and Super Bowl LVII and LVIII with the Kansas City Chiefs.

== College career ==
A 3-star wide receiver recruit, Watson committed to play college football for the University of Pennsylvania over an offer from Bucknell. In 40 career games at Penn from 2014 to 2017, Watson recorded 286 receptions for 3,777 yards and 33 touchdowns, and 44 carries for 339 yards and one touchdown. As a senior in 2017, Watson was named Third-team FCS All-American at wide receiver after recording 81 receptions for 1,083 yards and 14 touchdowns (a school record).

Watson finished his college career as a three-time All-Ivy League wide receiver (2015–17) and a two-time Ivy League champion (2015, 2016). He set the Penn career records for receptions, receiving yards, receiving touchdowns, and all-purpose yards. He also holds the record for the most receiving yards in conference play in Ivy League history and led the Ivy League in receptions, receiving yards, and receiving touchdowns in three consecutive seasons.

== Professional career ==
Pre-draft measurables
Height	Weight	Arm length	Hand span	Wingspan	40-yard dash	10-yard split	20-yard split	20-yard shuttle	Three-cone drill	Vertical jump	Broad jump	Bench press
6 ft 2 3/8 in (1.89 m)	215 lb (98 kg)	33 3/4 in (0.86 m)	9 1/4 in (0.23 m)	6 ft 6 1/8 in (1.98 m)	4.44 s	1.53 s	2.60 s	4.26 s	7.08 s	40.0 in (1.02 m)	10 ft 4 in (3.15 m)	20 reps
All values from Pro Day

=== Tampa Bay Buccaneers ===
Watson was selected by the Tampa Bay Buccaneers in the fifth round with the 144th overall pick in the 2018 NFL draft. He made his NFL debut on September 30, against the Chicago Bears. Watson caught his first career pass, a five-yard reception, on October 29, in a 37–34 loss to the Cincinnati Bengals. As a rookie, he appeared in 12 games. On December 8, 2019, he caught his first career touchdown, a 17-yard reception from quarterback Jameis Winston. In the 2019 season, he appeared in all 16 games and recorded 15 receptions for 159 receiving yards and two receiving touchdowns.

In Week 10 of the 2020 season against the Carolina Panthers, Watson recorded his first career sack on punter Joseph Charlton during a fake punt attempt during the 46–23 win. Watson was the first offensive player in Buccaneers' history to record a sack. He appeared in 11 games and recorded seven receptions for 94 yards on the season. Watson and the Buccaneers later went on to win Super Bowl LV against the Kansas City Chiefs 31–9.

On July 24, 2021, it was announced that Watson would be out four months after undergoing knee surgery, and was placed on the PUP list. He was placed on the reserve/physically unable to perform list on August 31. Watson was activated on December 24. He appeared in one game during the regular season. Watson was waived on January 15, 2022, and re-signed to the practice squad.

=== Kansas City Chiefs (first stint) ===
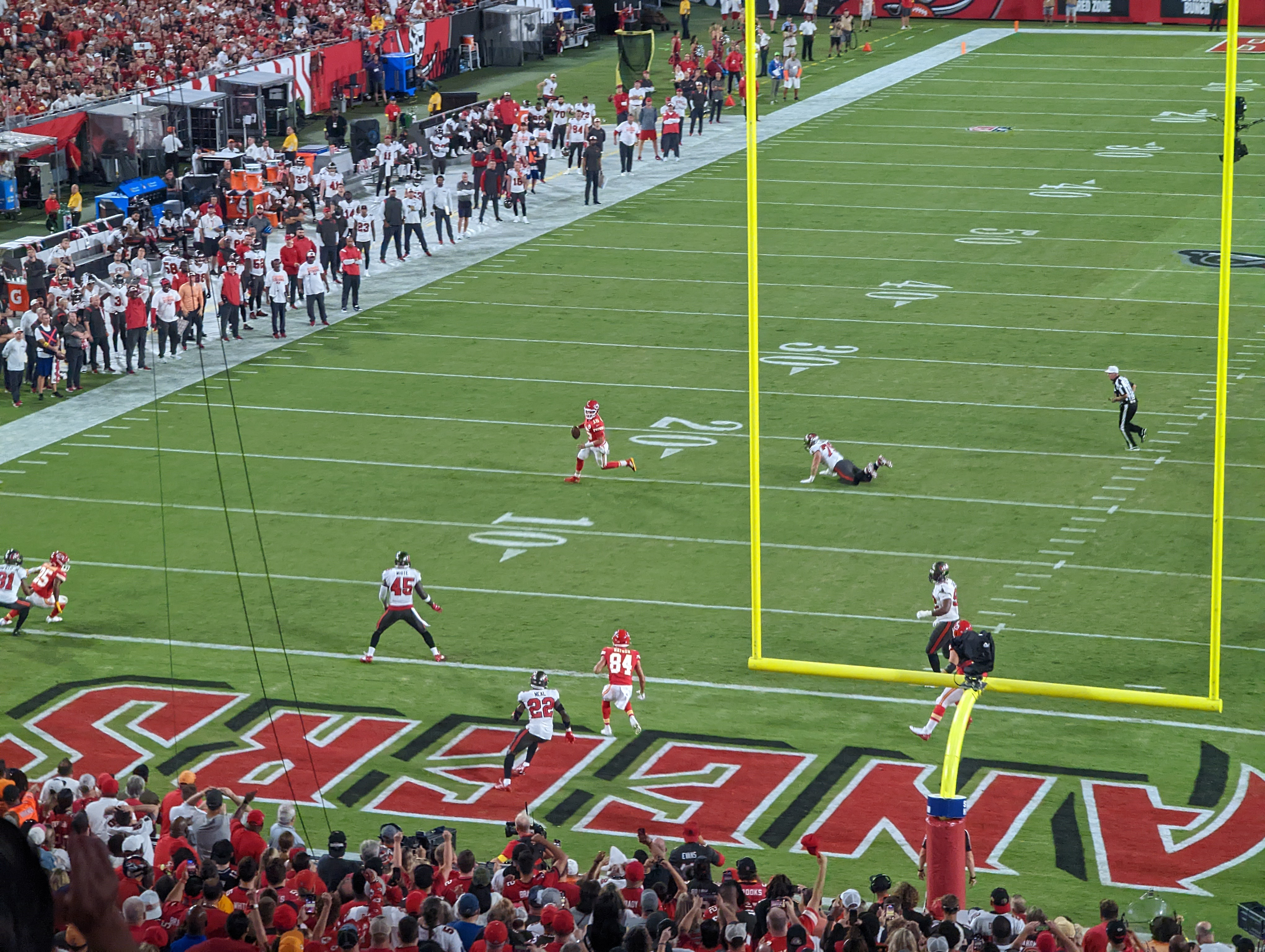
Watson (#84) playing against the Tampa Bay Buccaneers in 2022.

The Chiefs signed Watson to a one-year deal on February 4, 2022. In the 2022 season, Watson appeared in all 17 games, of which he started five. He finished with 15 receptions for 315 receiving yards and two receiving touchdowns. In Watson's first season with the Chiefs, they won Super Bowl LVII against the Philadelphia Eagles 38–35 with Watson catching two passes for 18 yards.

Watson re-signed with the Chiefs on April 17, 2023. In the 2023 season, Watson had 27 receptions for 460 yards and three touchdowns. The Chiefs won Super Bowl LVIII against the San Francisco 49ers 25–22 with Watson catching three passes for 54 yards. Watson won his third Super Bowl championship in the win.

In the 2024 season, Watson had 22 receptions for 289 yards and two touchdowns. In Super Bowl LIX, Watson recorded a two-point conversion in the 40–22 loss to the Philadelphia Eagles.

=== Houston Texans ===
On March 14, 2025, Watson signed with the Houston Texans. He recorded three catches for 30 yards across his first two appearances with Houston. On September 17, Watson was placed on injured reserve due to a calf muscle / Achilles injury suffered in Week 2 against the Tampa Bay Buccaneers. He was activated on December 29, ahead of the team's Week 17 matchup against the Los Angeles Chargers.

On August 30, 2026, Watson was released by the Texans as a part of final roster cuts.

=== Kansas City Chiefs (second stint) ===
On October 13, 2026, Watson signed with the Kansas City Chiefs practice squad. He was activated on October 24.

=== Regular season ===
Year	Team	Games		Receiving					Fumbles	
Year	Team	GP	GS	Rec	Yds	Avg	Lng	TD	Fum	Lost
2018	TB	12	0	1	5	5.0	5	0	0	0
2019	TB	16	2	15	159	10.6	17	2	0	0
2020	TB	11	2	7	94	13.4	36	0	0	0
2021	TB	1	0	0	0	0.0	0	0	0	0
2022	KC	16	5	15	315	21.0	67	2	0	0
2023	KC	17	8	27	460	17.0	41	3	1	0
Career		73	17	65	1,033	15.9	67	7	1	0
