= Taylor Stallworth =

American football player (born 1995)

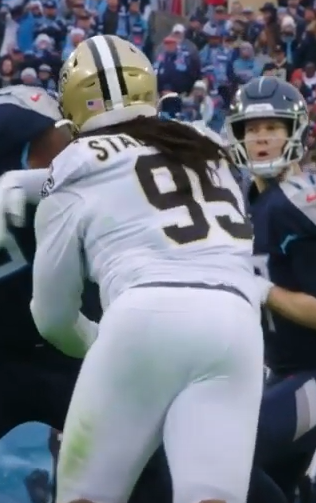
- Stallworth with the New Orleans Saints in 2019

No. 95 – St. Louis Battlehawks
- Position: Defensive tackle
- Roster status: Active

Personal information
- Born: August 18, 1995 (age 31); Mobile, Alabama, U.S.
- Listed height: 6 ft 2 in (1.88 m)
- Listed weight: 300 lb (136 kg)

Career information
- High school: Murphy (Mobile, Alabama)
- College: South Carolina (2014–2017)
- NFL draft: 2018: undrafted

Career history
- New Orleans Saints (2018–2019); Indianapolis Colts (2020–2021); Kansas City Chiefs (2022); Houston Texans (2022); Carolina Panthers (2023)*; Houston Texans (2023)*; Tennessee Titans (2023); San Francisco 49ers (2023)*; Washington Commanders (2024)*; Michigan Panthers (2025); St. Louis Battlehawks (2026–present)
- * Offseason or practice squad member only

Career NFL statistics
- Total tackles: 52
- Sacks: 4.5
- Fumble recoveries: 2
- Pass deflections: 1
- Stats at Pro Football Reference

Taylor Joseph Stallworth (born August 18, 1995) is an American professional football defensive tackle for the St. Louis Battlehawks of the United Football League (UFL). He played college football for the South Carolina Gamecocks and signed with the New Orleans Saints as an undrafted free agent in 2018. He has also played for the Indianapolis Colts, Kansas City Chiefs, Houston Texans, Tennessee Titans, and Washington Commanders.

== Early life ==
Stallworth was born and grew up in Mobile, Alabama and attended Murphy High School. As a junior, he registered 85 tackles and 10.5 sacks. He was named All-State and played in the Mississippi-Alabama All-Star game after recording 53 tackles, four sacks and 12 tackles for loss in his senior season. Stallworth committed to play college football at South Carolina over offers from Arkansas, Minnesota, Tennessee, Florida State, Georgia Tech, Kentucky, Vanderbilt, Southern Miss and Tulane.

== College career ==
Stallworth played four seasons with the South Carolina Gamecocks, becoming a starter for the team during his sophomore year. As a junior, his first full year as a starter, Stallworth tallied 41 tackles (three for loss) and a sack. He made 30 tackles, including 2.5 for loss, and had two pass breakups as a senior. Over the course of his career Stallworth had 87 tackles, a sack and 12 quarterback hurries in 41 games (31 starts).

== Professional career ==
Pre-draft measurables
Height	Weight	Arm length	Hand span	Wingspan	40-yard dash	10-yard split	20-yard split	20-yard shuttle	Three-cone drill	Vertical jump	Broad jump	Bench press
6 ft 2 in (1.88 m)	312 lb (142 kg)	32 1/2 in (0.83 m)	10 1/4 in (0.26 m)	6 ft 6 1/4 in (1.99 m)	5.10 s	1.75 s	2.84 s	4.75 s	7.95 s	26.0 in (0.66 m)	8 ft 5 in (2.57 m)	18 reps
All values from NFL Combine/Pro Day

=== New Orleans Saints ===
Stallworth signed with the New Orleans Saints as an undrafted free agent on May 8, 2018. He made the Saints' 53-man roster out of training camp after a solid performance during the preseason. Taylor made his NFL debut on September 15, 2018, against the Cleveland Browns. He recorded his first career sack on November 29, 2018, in the Saints' 13–10 loss to the Dallas Cowboys. In his rookie season, Stallworth recorded eight tackles, a sack, and a fumble recovery in 14 regular season games played and five tackles and a QB hit in two playoff games.

Stallworth was waived by the Saints on September 17, 2019, but was re-signed to the team's practice squad two days later after clearing waivers. Stallworth was promoted back up to the active roster on December 16, 2019. He finished the season with eight tackles in four regular season games and one tackle in the Saints' Divisional Round Playoff game. He was waived on August 3, 2020.

=== Indianapolis Colts ===
On August 10, 2020, Stallworth signed with the Indianapolis Colts. On January 10, 2021, Stallworth signed a one-year extension with the Colts.

=== Kansas City Chiefs ===
Stallworth signed with the Kansas City Chiefs on April 5, 2022. He was waived on August 30, 2022, and signed to the practice squad the next day. He was promoted to the active roster on October 12, 2022, but then was released on December 6, 2022.

=== Houston Texans ===
On December 7, 2022, Stallworth was claimed off waivers by the Houston Texans. Stallworth was placed on season–ending injured reserve on December 17. On February 28, 2023, Stallworth re–signed with the Texans on a one–year contract. He was placed on injured reserve on May 18 and released with an injury settlement on May 30.

=== Carolina Panthers ===
On June 29, 2023, Stallworth signed with the Carolina Panthers. On August 29, 2023, he was released for final roster cuts, but signed to the Panthers' practice squad the following day. He was released on September 11.

=== Houston Texans (second stint) ===
On October 4, 2023, Stallworth was signed to the Houston Texans practice squad, but was released three days later.

=== Tennessee Titans ===
On October 9, 2023, Stallworth was signed to the Tennessee Titans practice squad, and signed to the active roster five days later. He was placed on injured reserve on October 25. He was released on November 14, 2023.

=== San Francisco 49ers ===
On December 21, 2023, Stallworth was signed to the San Francisco 49ers practice squad, but was released few days later.

=== Washington Commanders ===
Stallworth signed with the Washington Commanders on August 4, 2024. He was placed on injured reserve on August 27, 2024, and released with an injury settlement on September 5, 2024.

=== Michigan Panthers ===
On April 25, 2025, Stallworth signed with the Michigan Panthers of the United Football League (UFL).

=== St. Louis Battlehawks ===
On January 13, 2026, Davis was selected by the St. Louis Battlehawks in the 2026 UFL Draft.

== NFL statistics ==
Year	Team	GP	GS	COMB	SOLO	AST	SACK	FF	FR	FR YDS	INT	IR YDS	AVG IR	LNG	TD	PD
2018	NO	14	0	8	6	2	1.0	0	1	0	0	0	0	0	0	0
2019	NO	4	0	8	5	3	0.0	0	0	0	0	0	0	0	0	0
2020	IND	16	1	12	5	7	0.5	0	1	0	0	0	0	0	0	0
2021	IND	16	1	16	11	5	3.0	0	0	0	0	0	0	0	0	1
2022	KC	6	0	4	1	3	0	0	0	0	0	0	0	0	0	0
2022	HOU	1	0	4	2	2	0	0	0	0	0	0	0	0	0	0
Career		57	2	52	30	22	4.5	0	2	0	0	0	0	0	0	1
