= Nazeeh Johnson =

American football player (born 1998)

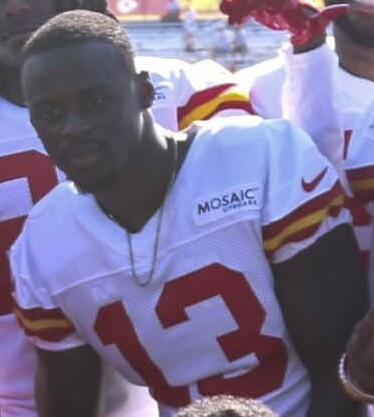
- Johnson with the Kansas City Chiefs in 2022

Profile
- Position: Cornerback

Personal information
- Born: July 17, 1998 (age 28); Martinsburg, West Virginia, U.S.
- Listed height: 5 ft 10 in (1.78 m)
- Listed weight: 199 lb (90 kg)

Career information
- High school: Millbrook (Winchester, Virginia)
- College: Marshall (2016–2021)
- NFL draft: 2022: 7th round, 259th overall pick

Career history
- Kansas City Chiefs (2022–2025); Tennessee Titans (2026)*
- * Offseason or practice squad member only

Awards and highlights
- 2x Super Bowl champion (LVII, LVIII)

Career NFL statistics as of 2025
- Total tackles: 66
- Pass deflections: 3
- Sacks: 1
- Stats at Pro Football Reference

Nazeeh Johnson (born July 17, 1998) is an American professional football cornerback. He played college football for the Marshall Thundering Herd and was selected by the Chiefs in the seventh round of the 2022 NFL draft.

== College career ==
Johnson was unranked as a recruit by 247Sports.com coming out of high school. Johnson majored in Communications and walked on to the Marshall football team. He started four seasons for the Herd, totaling 302 tackles, six tackles for loss, one sack, seven interceptions, 19 passes defended and a defensive touchdown.

== Professional career ==
Pre-draft measurables
| Height | Weight | Arm length | Hand span | Wingspan | 40-yard dash | 10-yard split | 20-yard split | 20-yard shuttle | Three-cone drill | Vertical jump | Broad jump | Bench press |
|---|---|---|---|---|---|---|---|---|---|---|---|---|
| 5 ft 10 1/4 in (1.78 m) | 199 lb (90 kg) | 30 3/8 in (0.77 m) | 9 in (0.23 m) | 5 ft 11 7/8 in (1.83 m) | 4.38 s | 1.52 s | 2.48 s | 4.29 s | 6.97 s | 42.0 in (1.07 m) | 10 ft 9 in (3.28 m) | 16 reps |
All values from Pro Day

=== Kansas City Chiefs ===
Johnson was drafted by the Kansas City Chiefs with the 259th pick in the seventh round of the 2022 NFL draft. He was waived on August 30, 2022, and signed to the practice squad the next day. Johnson was promoted to the active roster on September 28. Johnson won Super Bowl LVII when the Chiefs defeated the Philadelphia Eagles.

During training camp, Johnson suffered a torn ACL and was placed on season-ending injured reserve on July 30, 2023. Without Johnson, the Chiefs won Super Bowl LVIII against the San Francisco 49ers giving Johnson his second straight Super Bowl ring.

Johnson re-signed with the Chiefs on March 11, 2024. In the 2024 season, he had one sack, 56 tackles, and three passes defended.

In an August 15, 2025 preseason game against the Seattle Seahawks, Johnson departed the contest early due to a shoulder injury. The malady caused him to be placed on injured reserve on August 27. Johnson was activated on December 24, ahead of the team's Week 14 matchup against the Denver Broncos.

=== Tennessee Titans ===
On July 27, 2026, Johnson signed with the Tennessee Titans. On August 14, Johnson was suspended six games for violating the league’s policy against performance-enhancing substances. Later that day, Johnson wrote on social media that the reason for his failed test was due to his consumption of infertility medication, unaware of the fact that it was on the banned list. In the same post, Johnson shared that he and his wife had lost their baby. He was later placed on injured reserve on August 21 after undergoing ankle surgery. He was released on August 30.
