= Jody Fortson =

American football player (born 1995)

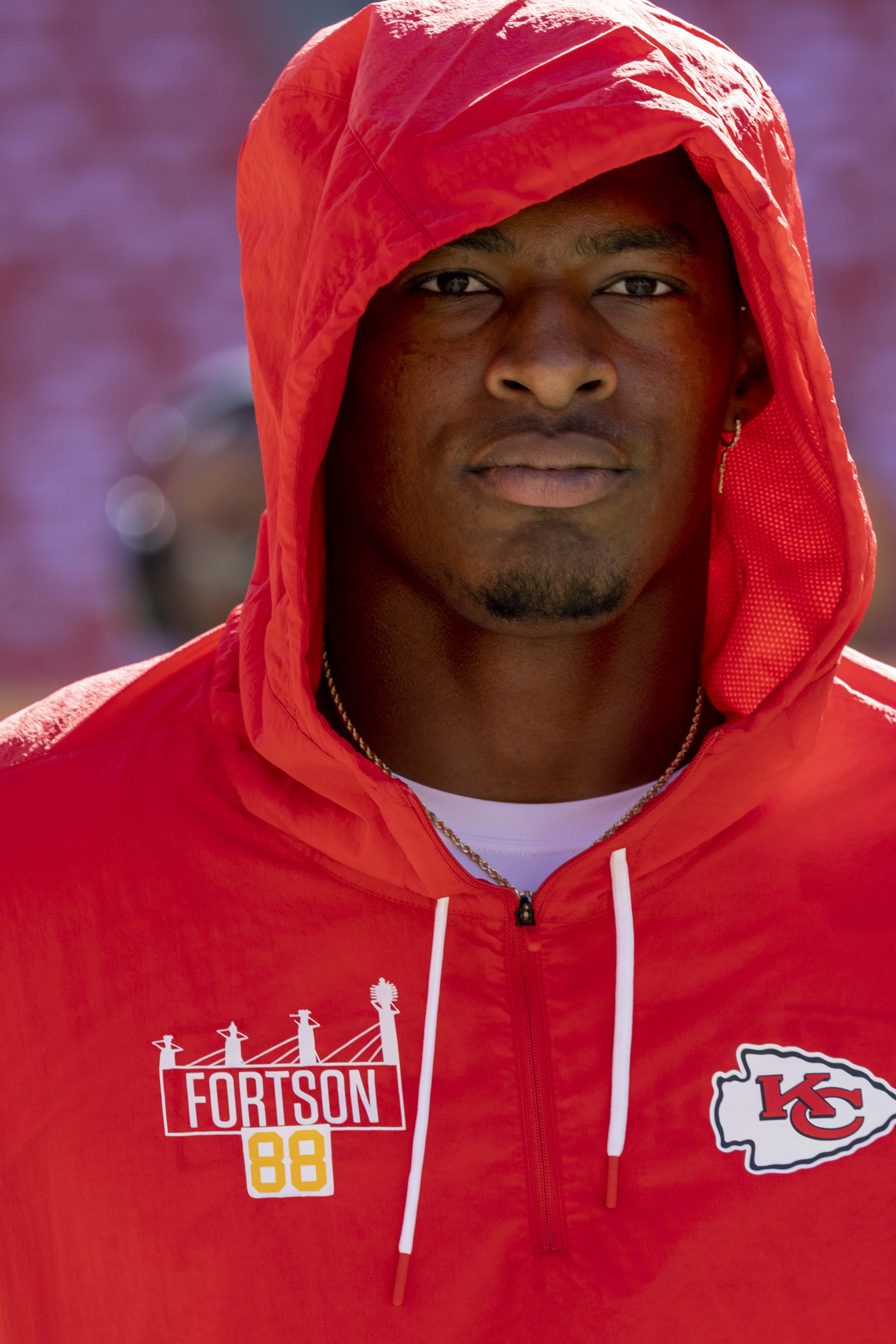
- Fortson in 2021

Profile
- Position: Tight end

Personal information
- Born: December 7, 1995 (age 30); Buffalo, New York, U.S.
- Listed height: 6 ft 4 in (1.93 m)
- Listed weight: 235 lb (107 kg)

Career information
- High school: South Park (Buffalo, New York)
- College: Erie CC (2015); Valdosta State (2016–2018)
- NFL draft: 2019: undrafted

Career history
- Kansas City Chiefs (2019–2023); Miami Dolphins (2024)*; Kansas City Chiefs (2024)
- * Offseason or practice squad member only

Awards and highlights
- 3× Super Bowl champion (LIV, LVII, LVIII); NCAA Division II National Champion (2018)

Career NFL statistics as of 2024
- Receptions: 15
- Receiving yards: 160
- Receiving touchdowns: 4
- Stats at Pro Football Reference

Joseph Demarius "Jody" Fortson Jr. (born December 7, 1995) is an American professional football tight end. He played college football for the Erie Kats and Valdosta State Blazers, and was signed by the Kansas City Chiefs as an undrafted free agent in 2019. Fortson has won three Super Bowls; Super Bowl LIV as a member of the Chiefs practice squad, and Super Bowl LVII while on the active roster.

== College career ==
Fortson began his college football career at Erie Community College before transferring to Valdosta State. A wide receiver in college, Fortson tallied 37 receptions for 477 yards and 7 touchdowns in 19 games played for the Valdosta State Blazers.

Despite an abbreviated senior season due to injury in which the Blazers won the NCAA Division II National Championship, Fortson was chosen to play in both the Tropical Bowl as well as the College Gridiron Showcase all-star events.

== Professional career ==
Pre-draft measurables
Height	Weight	Arm length	Hand span	40-yard dash	10-yard split	20-yard split	20-yard shuttle	Three-cone drill	Vertical jump	Broad jump	Bench press
6 ft 4 1/4 in (1.94 m)	226 lb (103 kg)	33 1/4 in (0.84 m)	10 in (0.25 m)	4.84 s	1.55 s	2.82 s	4.59 s	7.52 s	34.0 in (0.86 m)	10 ft 7 in (3.23 m)	13 reps
All values from Pro Day

=== Kansas City Chiefs (first stint) ===
Going into the NFL, Fortson converted to tight end and signed with the Kansas City Chiefs as an undrafted free agent on May 13, 2019. He was waived on August 31, 2019, and signed to the practice squad the next day. Fortson remained on practice squad for the rest of the season and as the Chiefs won Super Bowl LIV against the San Francisco 49ers. He re-signed with the Chiefs on February 5, 2020. He was waived on September 5, 2020. He signed to the practice squad the following day.

On February 9, 2021, Fortson re-signed with the Chiefs. He made the Chiefs' active roster on August 31, 2021.

He recorded his first career NFL reception against the Baltimore Ravens in Week 2 of the 2021 season. He recorded his first career NFL touchdown reception the following week against the Los Angeles Chargers. He was placed on injured reserve on October 23. He was placed on Reserve/COVID-19 on December 10, 2021. On the season, he appeared in six games and had five receptions for 47 yards and two touchdowns.

Fortson appeared in 13 games and had nine receptions for 108 yards and two touchdowns in the 2022 season. After suffering an elbow injury in Week 15 against the Houston Texans, Fortson was placed on season–ending injured reserve on December 23, 2022. Fortson won his second Super Bowl when the Chiefs won Super Bowl LVII against the Philadelphia Eagles.

Fortson, who was an exclusive rights free agent, was tendered by the Chiefs on March 14, 2023. His contract for the 2023 season will be a one-year league minimum contract. He was placed on injured reserve on August 15, 2023 after suffering a dislocated shoulder. Without Fortson, the Chiefs won Super Bowl LVIII against the San Francisco 49ers giving Fortson his third Super Bowl championship.

=== Miami Dolphins ===
On March 15, 2024, Fortson signed with the Miami Dolphins. He was released on August 25, 2024.

=== Kansas City Chiefs (second stint) ===
On September 26, 2024, Fortson signed to the Kansas City Chiefs practice squad, and promoted to the active roster a week later. On October 28, 2024, the Chiefs placed Fortson on injured reserve due to a knee injury.

== Career statistics ==
Regular season statistics
Year	Team	Games		Receiving					Rushing					Fumbles	
Year	Team	GP	GS	Rec	Yds	Avg	Lng	TD	Att	Yds	Avg	Lng	TD	Fum	Lost
2021	KC	6	0	5	47	9.4	27	2	0	0	0.0	0	0	0	0
2022	KC	13	1	9	108	12.0	40	2	0	0	0.0	0	0	1	0
2024	KC	3	0	1	5	5.0	5	0	0	0	0.0	0	0	0	0
Career		22	1	15	160	10.7	40	4	0	0	0.0	0	0	1	0
