= Noah Gray =

American football player (born 1999)

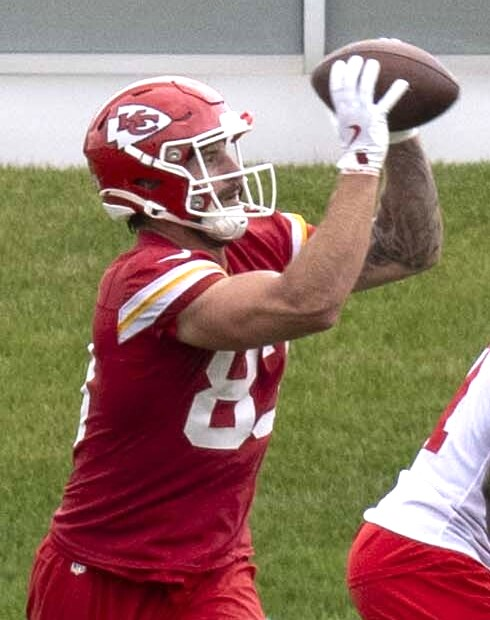
- Gray with the Kansas City Chiefs in 2025

No. 83 – Kansas City Chiefs
- Position: Tight end
- Roster status: Active

Personal information
- Born: April 30, 1999 (age 27); Laconia, New Hampshire, U.S.
- Listed height: 6 ft 3 in (1.91 m)
- Listed weight: 240 lb (109 kg)

Career information
- High school: Leominster (Leominster, Massachusetts)
- College: Duke (2017–2020)
- NFL draft: 2021: 5th round, 162nd overall pick

Career history
- Kansas City Chiefs (2021–present)

Awards and highlights
- 2× Super Bowl champion (LVII, LVIII); Second-team All-American (2019); Second-team All-ACC (2019)

Career NFL statistics as of 2025
- Receptions: 124
- Receiving yards: 1,255
- Receiving touchdowns: 9
- Rushing yards: -2
- Rushing touchdowns: 1
- Stats at Pro Football Reference

Noah Ryan Gray (born April 30, 1999) is an American professional football tight end for the Kansas City Chiefs of the National Football League (NFL). He played college football for the Duke Blue Devils and was selected by the Chiefs in the fifth round of the 2021 NFL draft.

== Early life ==
Gray grew up in Gardner, Massachusetts and attended Leominster High School. He played wide receiver as a freshman before becoming the team's starting quarterback the next season. He completed 101 of 179 passes for 1,707 yards and 21 touchdowns in his junior season. As a senior, Gray moved back to wide receiver and was named first-team All-State after catching 30 passes for 619 yards and eight touchdowns. Gray committed to play college football at Duke over offers from Temple and Appalachian State. Gray was diagnosed with type 1 diabetes at age 18 during his freshman year of college.

== College career ==
Gray recorded five receptions for 37 yards and two touchdowns as a freshman. He played in all 13 of Duke's games and had 20 receptions for 234 yards and one touchdown in his sophomore season. As a junior, Gray had 51 receptions for 392 yards and three touchdowns and was named second-team All-Atlantic Coast Conference and a second-team All-American by the Walter Camp Football Foundation. Gray entered his senior year on the watchlist for the Mackey Award and as one of the top tight end prospects for the 2021 NFL draft.

== Professional career ==
Pre-draft measurables
Height	Weight	Arm length	Hand span	Wingspan	40-yard dash	10-yard split	20-yard split	20-yard shuttle	Three-cone drill	Vertical jump	Broad jump	Bench press
6 ft 3 in (1.91 m)	240 lb (109 kg)	31 5/8 in (0.80 m)	9 1/4 in (0.23 m)	6 ft 6 1/4 in (1.99 m)	4.60 s	1.61 s	2.70 s	4.45 s	6.90 s	35.0 in (0.89 m)	9 ft 7 in (2.92 m)	15 reps
All values from Pro Day

Gray was selected by the Kansas City Chiefs in the fifth round, 162nd overall, of the 2021 NFL draft. He signed his four-year rookie contract on May 13, 2021. He scored his first career NFL touchdown against the Las Vegas Raiders in Week 10, on Sunday Night Football. He appeared in all 16 games, of which he started one, as a rookie. He finished with seven receptions for 36 receiving yards and a touchdown.

In the 2022 season, Gray appeared in all 17 games, of which he started eight. He finished with 28 receptions for 299 receiving yards and one receiving touchdown. Gray became a Super Bowl champion when the Chiefs beat the Philadelphia Eagles in Super Bowl LVII. He had one reception for six yards in the game.

In the 2023 season, Gray appeared in all 17 games. He finished with 28 receptions for 305 receiving yards and two receiving touchdowns. Gray won his second straight Super Bowl championship when the Chiefs defeated the San Francisco 49ers in Super Bowl LVIII. Gray had two receptions for 22 yards in the game.

On September 5, 2024, Gray and the Chiefs agreed to a three–year, $19.5 million contract extension. In Weeks 11 and 12, he recorded consecutive games with two receiving touchdowns. In the 2024 season, he had 40 receptions for 437 yards and five touchdowns. He had one reception for two yards in the 40–22 loss to the Eagles in Super Bowl LIX.

== NFL career statistics ==
Legend
	Won the Super Bowl
**Bold**	Career best

=== Regular season ===
Year	Team	Games		Receiving					Fumbles	
Year	Team	GP	GS	Rec	Yds	Y/R	Lng	TD	Fum	Lost
2021	KC	16	1	7	36	5.1	8	1	0	0
2022	KC	17	8	28	299	10.7	27	1	0	0
2023	KC	17	10	28	305	**10.9**	34	2	0	0
2024	KC	17	10	**40**	**437**	**10.9**	**35**	**5**	0	0
2025	KC	16	6	21	178	8.5	28	0	0	0
2026	KC	4	2	6	61	10.2	24	0	0	0
Career		87	37	130	1,316	10.1	35	9	0	0

=== Postseason ===
Year	Team	Games		Receiving					Fumbles	
Year	Team	GP	GS	Rec	Yds	Y/R	Lng	TD	Fum	Lost
2021	KC	3	0	2	14	7.0	8	0	0	0
2022	KC	3	3	3	37	**12.3**	**27**	0	0	0
2023	KC	4	2	**8**	**66**	8.3	20	0	0	0
2024	KC	3	0	3	13	4.3	6	0	0	0
Career		13	5	16	130	8.1	27	0	0	0

== Personal life ==
Gray is a Christian. He is married to Mary Elise Gray. They have one daughter.
