= Kehinde Oginni Hassan =

Nigerian gridiron football player (born 1999)

Profile
- Position: Linebacker

Personal information
- Born: 3 March 1999 (age 27); Abakaliki, Nigeria
- Listed height: 6 ft 6 in (1.98 m)
- Listed weight: 232 lb (105 kg)

Career information
- College: Ahmadu Bello
- NFL draft: 2022: undrafted

Career history
- Kansas City Chiefs (2022)*; Atlanta Falcons (2024)*
- * Offseason or practice squad member only
- Stats at Pro Football Reference

Kehinde Oginni Hassan (born 3 March 1999) is a Nigerian professional American football linebacker. He was originally signed by the Chiefs as an undrafted free agent in 2022 as part of the International Player Pathway Program (IPPP).

== Early life and education ==
Oginni Hassan was born in Abakaliki, Nigeria. He played basketball until he was 15, believing he was too lanky to play football. In 2014, he received an invitation to attend a sports camp hosted by the Ejike Ugboaja Foundation (EUF). "I thought, 'wow, that's a great opportunity for me to go there and learn more about the game. I was 15 years old then, and we embarked on a journey. It was eight hours to where the camp was, so me and a couple of my friends went out there to learn about the game. After the camp, they gave us some equipment, some balls, told us to keep learning, keep working on ourselves," he said. He "instantly knew football was his future."

"Then we had an accident on our way back..." After leaving camp on 10 June, the bus he was riding home on collided with an automobile, and three of his friends were killed, and Oginni Hassan was left with severe injuries. "I think the whole incident motivated me [to play football] more," he later said. "I remember spending two months in the hospital, thinking about this game. I just thought, 'if I'm not going to do it because of me, I need to do it because of them.' I could be down about the whole situation, or I could just keep trying. For me to be able to now come to a big stage, that was the promise I made to myself because the whole world needs to know about them and hear about these guys. Everyone needs to hear about Tochuwku, David and Hussein. That was my whole focus. I feel motivated through those guys."

In his free time in the next few years, Oginni Hassan trained with the local football team at Ahmadu Bello University, posting videos of his workouts on YouTube in hopes of attracting attention from college football teams in the United States. His plan worked and he gained attention from several US colleges, but due to the high cost of getting a visa and the irregularity of football in Nigeria, his applications to play in America were denied several times.

At the time, there was no other team football team in West Africa for Ahmadu Bello to play. So the team, founded in 2009, did not find an opponent to play until 2016. On 5 March 2016, they met their first opponent, the Lagos Marines, and won 26–14. In the game, Oginni Hassan recorded six receptions for 104 yards and scored two touchdowns.

In 2021, former National Football League (NFL) player Osi Umenyiora opened a football camp in Nigeria for the International Player Pathway Program (IPPP), which gives foreign players opportunities in the NFL. Oginni Hassan attended the camp and was one of three selected to train in London to show their talent to NFL scouts. He trained for six months in London and afterwards traveled to Arizona State University to take part in their pro day.

== Professional career ==
=== Kansas City Chiefs ===
The scouts of the Kansas City Chiefs were impressed with what they saw in his Arizona State pro day, and gave Oginni Hassan a contract as an undrafted free agent on 6 May, 2022. He was originally listed as a tight end, but was assigned the number 67, which can only be used by offensive and defensive lineman. He was waived on 30 August.

=== Atlanta Falcons ===
Oginni was signed by the Atlanta Falcons as a defensive end on 9 May 2024. He was waived on 27 August, and re-signed to the practice squad. Oginni was released on 14 October.
