= Nakia Griffin-Stewart =

American football player (born 1996)

No. 48
- Position: Tight end

Personal information
- Born: November 12, 1996 (age 29); Tenafly, New Jersey, U.S.
- Listed height: 6 ft 5 in (1.96 m)
- Listed weight: 260 lb (118 kg)

Career information
- High school: Tenafly (Tenafly, New Jersey)
- College: Rutgers (2015–2018); Pittsburgh (2019)
- NFL draft: 2020: undrafted

Career history
- Minnesota Vikings (2020)*; Green Bay Packers (2020)*; New York Giants (2020–2021)*; Kansas City Chiefs (2021); Cleveland Browns (2022)*; Indianapolis Colts (2022)*
- * Offseason or practice squad member only
- Stats at Pro Football Reference

Nakia Griffin-Stewart (born November 12, 1996) is an American former football tight end. He played college football for the Rutgers Scarlet Knights and the Pitt Panthers. Nakia added the name Stewart to his last name in honor of his step-father in 2015 at the beginning of his college football career.

After his playing career, Griffin-Stewart began working as a legal associate for the National Football League Management Council and as the operations coordinator for the NFL Player Care Foundation. He is an assistant producer at EA Sports, contributing to their North American football video games.

Raised in Tenafly, New Jersey, Griffin-Stewart played prep football at Tenafly High School, where he was rated the 12th-best tight end in the nation in his graduating recruiting class by ESPN.

== Professional career ==
=== Minnesota Vikings ===
Griffin-Stewart was signed by the Minnesota Vikings as an undrafted free agent on April 28, 2020. He was waived by the Vikings during final roster cuts on September 5, 2020.

=== Green Bay Packers ===
Griffin-Stewart was signed to the Green Bay Packers' practice squad on September 23, 2020. He was waived on November 3, 2020.

=== New York Giants ===
Griffin-Stewart was signed to the New York Giants' practice squad on November 24, 2020. He was released from the practice squad on December 8, 2020. Griffin-Stewart signed a reserve/future contract with the Giants on January 11, 2021. He was waived at the end of the preseason on August 31, 2021.

=== Kansas City Chiefs ===
Griffin-Stewart signed by the Kansas City Chiefs to their practice squad on November 3, 2021. He was released on November 9, but was re-signed on November 29. Griffin-Stewart was elevated to the active roster on December 26, 2021, for the team's Week 16 game against the Pittsburgh Steelers and made his NFL debut in the game. He was released on January 18, 2022. He signed a reserve/future contract with the Chiefs on February 7, 2022. He was waived on May 5, 2022.

=== Cleveland Browns ===
On May 24, 2022, Griffin-Stewart signed with the Cleveland Browns. He was waived by the Browns on August 30, 2022.

=== Indianapolis Colts ===
On September 20, 2022, Griffin-Stewart was signed to the Indianapolis Colts practice squad. He was released on October 17.
