= 2024 Kansas City Chiefs season =

American football season

- Owner: The Hunt Family (Clark Hunt Chairman and CEO)
- General manager: Brett Veach
- Head coach: Andy Reid
- Offensive coordinator: Matt Nagy
- Defensive coordinator: Steve Spagnuolo
- Home stadium: Arrowhead Stadium

Results
- Record: 15–2
- Division place: 1st AFC West
- Playoffs: Won Divisional Playoffs (vs. Texans) 23–14; Won AFC Championship (vs. Bills) 32–29; Lost Super Bowl LIX (vs. Eagles) 22–40
- All-Pros: 4: LG Joe Thuney (1st team); C Creed Humphrey (1st team); IDL Chris Jones (1st team); CB Trent McDuffie (2nd team)
- Pro Bowlers: 5: Selected but did not play due to participation in Super Bowl LIX: LG Joe Thuney; DT Chris Jones; TE Travis Kelce; C Creed Humphrey; RG Trey Smith
- Team MVP: Joe Thuney
- Team ROY: Xavier Worthy

Uniform
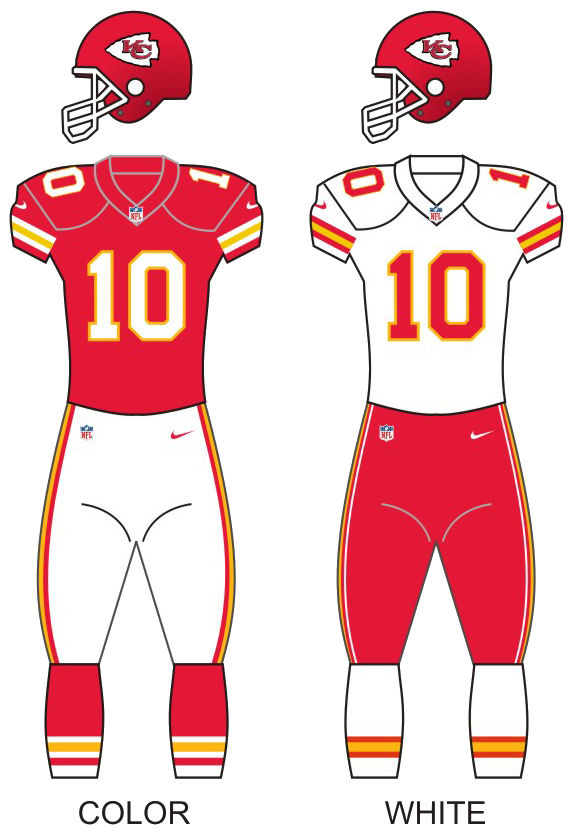

The 2024 season was the Kansas City Chiefs' 55th in the National Football League (NFL), their 65th overall and their 12th under head coach Andy Reid. The Chiefs entered the season as the defending champions for the second straight year and attempted to become the first team to win three straight Super Bowl championships, as well as win three straight NFL championships since the Green Bay Packers did so twice (from 1929 to 1931, and from 1965 to 1967). The Chiefs started 9–0 for the first time since 2013 and became the last undefeated team in the NFL following their Week 7 win over the San Francisco 49ers coupled with the Minnesota Vikings losing to the Detroit Lions earlier that day.

Following a Week 10 win over the Denver Broncos, the Chiefs secured their twelfth consecutive winning season. Their hopes of going undefeated were dashed following a Week 11 road loss to the Buffalo Bills. They clinched their tenth straight playoff berth, the second longest string in NFL history (only surpassed by the 2009-2019 New England Patriots' 11 straight, and equalling the 1946-1955 Cleveland Browns) following a Week 13 win over the Las Vegas Raiders on Black Friday coupled with the Miami Dolphins losing to the Green Bay Packers the previous day. With a Week 14 win over the Los Angeles Chargers, the Chiefs clinched their ninth consecutive AFC West title, a record-extending 17th AFC West title, and improved on their 11–6 record from the previous season. Following a Week 16 win over the Houston Texans, the Chiefs went undefeated at home for the first time since 2003. Following a Week 17 road win over the Pittsburgh Steelers on Christmas Day, the Chiefs clinched a first-round bye and home-field advantage throughout the AFC playoffs as the top seed. They were also the first team to win at least 15 games since the 2015 Carolina Panthers, set a new franchise regular season win record, and became one of the first two teams to win 15 games in a 17-game season, along with the Detroit Lions, and the first AFC team to do so. Although they did win 15 games, they never scored more than 30 points in a regular season game all season, becoming the first two-time defending champion to not score more than 30 points since the 1956 Cleveland Browns, as well as 11 of their wins being within one score. Their point differential of +59 is the worst of all teams to finish with three or fewer losses since the 1970 AFL–NFL merger outside of the strike-shortened 1982 season, while their 385 points scored is the second-lowest of any team to finish with at least 15 wins in a season, only behind the 2004 Pittsburgh Steelers (who scored 372 points).

In the Divisional Round, the top-seeded Chiefs defeated the Houston Texans 23–14 to advance to their seventh consecutive AFC Championship Game (only trailing the 2011–2018 Patriots for the most ever) as Andy Reid became the fourth head coach to pass 300 wins, including postseason. (Note: George Halas, Don Shula, and Bill Belichick were the first three.) The Chiefs defeated the Buffalo Bills 32–29 in the AFC Championship Game to advance to their third straight Super Bowl, becoming the first two-time defending Super Bowl champion to play for a possible third consecutive title. In a rematch of Super Bowl LVII from two years prior, Kansas City faced the NFC champion Philadelphia Eagles in Super Bowl LIX, but this time lost to Philadelphia by a lopsided score of 22-40. The crushing defeat ended Kansas City's hopes of completing the first Super Bowl three–peat in NFL history. With the loss, the Chiefs became the first 15-win team to lose the Super Bowl since the 2015 Carolina Panthers, and the seventh consecutive team to post 15 or more regular season wins and fail to win the Super Bowl, joining the Lions, who lost earlier in the playoffs to the Washington Commanders. Additionally, the Chiefs became the first defending Super Bowl champion to lose the following year's Super Bowl since 2020, when the Chiefs themselves lost Super Bowl LV to the Tampa Bay Buccaneers after winning Super Bowl LIV. The Chiefs also became the first franchise in NFL history to lose in two Super Bowls as the defending Super Bowl champions.

As of 2026, this was the most recent season where the Chiefs finished 1st in the AFC West division, won the AFC Championship, qualify the playoffs, and have a winning record.

== Offseason ==
All transactions below occurred between the day after the Chiefs' final game of the 2023 season and the first game of the 2024 preseason. The only exception is futures contracts which the Chiefs began being signed after the conclusion of the 2023 regular season.

=== Futures contracts ===
Futures contracts are signed beginning with the conclusion of the previous season. They typically consist of players who spent a portion of the previous season on the practice squad of a team.

2024 Kansas City Chiefs Futures contracts
Player	Position
Ian Book	QB
Isaiah Buggs	DT
Jacob Copeland	WR
Trey Dean	S
Matt Dickerson	DT
Izaiah Gathings	TE
Chukwuebuka Godrick	OT
Hassan Hall	RB
Keaontay Ingram	RB
Truman Jones	DE
Kelvin Joseph	CB
Anthony Miller	WR
Chris Oladokun	QB
Deneric Prince	RB
Jordan Smith	DE
Shi Smith	WR
Keith Taylor	CB
Montrell Washington	WR

=== Players lost ===
Below are players who were on the roster at the end of the 2023 season, but were either released or did not re-sign after their contract expired.

2024 Kansas City Chiefs Players lost
Player	Position	Reason	New team
Nick Allegretti	G	UFA	Washington Commanders
Blake Bell	TE	UFA	TBD
Mike Edwards	S	UFA	Buffalo Bills
Jody Fortson	TE	UFA	Miami Dolphins
Blaine Gabbert	QB	UFA	TBD
Willie Gay	LB	UFA	New Orleans Saints
Richie James	WR	UFA	TBD
Jerick McKinnon	RB	UFA	TBD
Donovan Smith	OT	UFA	TBD
Tommy Townsend	P	UFA	Houston Texans
Marquez Valdes-Scantling	WR	Released	Buffalo Bills
Prince Tega Wanogho	OT	UFA	TBD

=== Signings ===
2024 Kansas City Chiefs signings
Player	Position	Previous team
Matt Araiza	P	Buffalo Bills (2022)
Marquise Brown	WR	Arizona Cardinals
Tyree Gillespie	S	Kansas City Chiefs Practice squad
Louis Rees-Zammit	RB	None*
Mike Pennel	DT	Kansas City Chiefs Practice squad
Cornell Powell	WR	Kansas City Chiefs Practice squad
Gerrit Prince	TE	Kansas City Chiefs Practice squad
Irv Smith Jr.	TE	Cincinnati Bengals
Carson Wentz	QB	Los Angeles Rams

* Rees-Zammit was signed via the NFL's International Player Pathway Program from Wales.

=== Trades ===
Trades below only are for trades that included a player. Draft pick only trades will go in draft section.

2024 Kansas City Chiefs trades
Team	Received	Compensation
Tennessee Titans	7th round selection 2024 NFL draft 3rd round selection 2025 NFL draft	CB L'Jarius Sneed; 7th round selection 2024 NFL draft
Tennessee Titans	WR DeAndre Hopkins	4th or 5th round selection 2025 NFL draft (Note: If the Chiefs advanced to Super Bowl LIX and Hopkins played in 60% of the snaps, the Titans would receive the Chiefs' fourth-round selection; otherwise, the Titans will receive their fifth-round selection.)
New England Patriots	LB Joshua Uche	6th round selection 2026 NFL draft

=== Draft ===
2024 Kansas City Chiefs draft selections
Round	Selection	Player	Position	College	Notes
1	28	Xavier Worthy	WR	Texas	From Bills (Note: The Chiefs traded first-, third- and seventh-round selections (32nd, 95th and 221st overall) to the Buffalo Bills in exchange for first-, fourth- and seventh-round selections (28th, 133rd and 248th overall).)
1	32	Traded to the Buffalo Bills			
2	63	Kingsley Suamataia	OT	BYU	From 49ers (Note: The Chiefs traded second- and fifth-round selections (64th and 173rd overall) to the San Francisco 49ers in exchange for second- and sixth-round selections (63rd and 211th overall).)
2	64	Traded to the San Francisco 49ers			
3	95	Traded to the Buffalo Bills			
4	131	Jared Wiley	TE	TCU	
4	133	Jaden Hicks	S	Washington State	Compensatory pick; from Bills
5	159	Hunter Nourzad	C	Penn State	From Cowboys (Note: The Chiefs traded a 2023 sixth-round selection (178th overall) to the Dallas Cowboys in exchange for a fifth-round selection (159th overall).)
5	167	Traded to the Minnesota Vikings (Note: The Chiefs traded a fifth-round selection (167th overall) and a 2023 fourth-round selection (134th overall) to the Minnesota Vikings in exchange for a 2023 fourth-round selection (119th overall).)			
5	173	Traded to the San Francisco 49ers			
6	208	Traded to the Las Vegas Raiders (Note: The Chiefs traded a sixth-round selection (208th overall) to the Las Vegas Raiders in exchange for DT Neil Farrell Jr.)			
6	211	Kamal Hadden	CB	Tennessee	Compensatory pick; from 49ers
7	221	Traded to the Buffalo Bills			From Panthers via Titans (Note: The Chiefs traded a seventh-round selection (252nd overall) and CB L'Jarius Sneed to the Tennessee Titans in exchange for a seventh-round selection (221st overall) and a 2025 third-round selection.)
7	248	C. J. Hanson	OG	Holy Cross	From Bills
7	252	Traded to the Tennessee Titans			

2024 Kansas City Chiefs undrafted free agents
Name	Position	College	Ref.
Emani Bailey	RB	TCU	
Miles Battle	CB	Utah	
Swayze Bozeman	LB	Southern Miss	
Phillip Brooks	WR	Kansas State	
Reggie Brown	WR	James Madison	
Baylor Cupp	TE	Texas Tech	
Ethan Driskell	OT	Marshall	
Curtis Jacobs	LB	Penn State	
Fabien Lovett	DT	Florida State	
Griffin McDowell	OT	Chattanooga	
McKade Mettauer	G	Oklahoma	
Derrick Miller	CB	Kent State	
Ryan Rehkow	P	BYU	
Christian Roland-Wallace	CB	USC	
Carson Steele	FB	UCLA	
Nick Torres	G	Villanova	
Luquay Washington	LB	Central Connecticut	
Jaaron Hayek	WR	Villanova	
Alex Gubner	DT	Montana	

Draft trades

== Staff ==
2024 Kansas City Chiefs staff
Front office: Chairman/CEO – Clark Hunt; President – Mark Donovan; General manager – Brett Veach; Assistant general manager – Mike Borgonzi; Senior vice president of football operations and strategy – Chris Shea; Senior director of player personnel – Mike Bradway; Director of player personnel/pro – Tim Terry; Director of player personnel/college – Ryne Nutt; Senior personnel executive – Willie Davis; Co-directors of college scouting – Pat Sperduto and David Hinson; Assistant director of football administration – Jack Wolov; Head coaches: Head coach – Andy Reid; Assistant head coach/special teams coordinator – Dave Toub; Offensive coaches: Offensive coordinator – Matt Nagy; Pass game coordinator – Joe Bleymaier; Quarterbacks – David Girardi; Running backs – Todd Pinkston; Assistant running backs – Porter Ellett; Wide receivers – Connor Embree; Tight ends – Tom Melvin; Offensive line – Andy Heck; Assistant offensive line – Corey Matthaei; Offensive assistant – Kevin Saxton; Offensive quality control/assistant quarterbacks – Dan Williams	Defensive coaches: Defensive coordinator – Steve Spagnuolo; Defensive line – Joe Cullen; Assistant defensive line – Terry Bradden; Linebackers/run game coordinator – Brendan Daly; Outside linebackers – Rod Wilson; Defensive backs – Dave Merritt; Safeties – Donald D'Alesio; Defensive quality control – Alex Whittingham; Special teams coaches: Assistant special teams – Andy Hill; Strength and conditioning: Vice president of sports medicine and performance – Rick Burkholder; Head strength and conditioning/director of sports science – Ryan Reynolds; Assistant strength and conditioning – Greg Carbin; Assistant strength and conditioning – Tyler Judkins; Assistant strength and conditioning – Spencer Reid

== Final roster ==
2024 Kansas City Chiefs roster
Quarterbacks (QB): 15 Patrick Mahomes; 11 Carson Wentz; Running backs (RB): 29 Kareem Hunt; 10 Isiah Pacheco; 34 Samaje Perine; 42 Carson Steele; Wide receivers (WR): 5 Marquise Brown; 8 DeAndre Hopkins; 81 Nikko Remigio; 9 JuJu Smith-Schuster; 84 Justin Watson; 1 Xavier Worthy; Tight ends (TE): 83 Noah Gray; 88 Peyton Hendershot; 87 Travis Kelce	Offensive linemen (OL): 66 Mike Caliendo G; 75 Ethan Driskell T; 61 C. J. Hanson G; 52 Creed Humphrey C; 70 D. J. Humphries T; 64 Wanya Morris T; 60 Hunter Nourzad C/G; 65 Trey Smith G; 76 Kingsley Suamataia T; 74 Jawaan Taylor T; 62 Joe Thuney G/T; Defensive linemen (DL): 97 Felix Anudike-Uzomah DE; 51 Mike Danna DE; 94 Malik Herring DE; 95 Chris Jones DT; 56 George Karlaftis DE; 91 Derrick Nnadi DT; 90 Charles Omenihu DE; 69 Mike Pennel DT; 55 Joshua Uche DE; 98 Tershawn Wharton DT	Linebackers (LB): 32 Nick Bolton MLB; 54 Leo Chenal OLB; 44 Cam Jones OLB; 23 Drue Tranquill OLB; Defensive backs (DB): 27 Chamarri Conner SS; 6 Bryan Cook FS; 21 Jaden Hicks FS; 13 Nazeeh Johnson CB; 22 Trent McDuffie CB; 20 Justin Reid SS; 30 Christian Roland-Wallace CB; 39 Keith Taylor CB; 35 Jaylen Watson CB; 2 Joshua Williams CB; Special teams (ST): 14 Matt Araiza P; 7 Harrison Butker K; 41 James Winchester LS	Practice squad: 50 Swayze Bozeman OLB; -- Jason Brownlee WR; 26 Deon Bush SS; 48 Cole Christiansen OLB; 47 Baylor Cupp TE (PS/I); 85 Anthony Firkser TE; 72 Chukwuebuka Godrick T; 99 Siaki Ika DT; 38 Keaontay Ingram RB; 31 Nic Jones CB; 96 Fabien Lovett DT; 38 Steven Nelson CB; 13 Chris Oladokun QB; 82 Justyn Ross WR; 46 Darius Rush CB; 29 Eric Scott Jr. CB; 19 Tyquan Thornton WR; 80 Montrell Washington WR; Reserve: 43 Jack Cochrane MLB (IR); 89 Jody Fortson TE (IR); 17 Mecole Hardman WR (IR); -- McKade Mettauer G (IR); 24 Skyy Moore WR (IR); 4 Rashee Rice WR (IR); 40 Spencer Shrader K (IR); 53 B. J. Thompson DE (NF-Ill.); 92 Marlon Tuipulotu DT (IR); 12 Jared Wiley TE (IR); Rookies in italics 53 active, 10 reserve, 16 practice squad (2 exempt)

== Preseason ==
=== Schedule ===
Week	Date	Opponent	Result	Record	Venue	Recap
1	August 10	at Jacksonville Jaguars	L 13–26	0–1	EverBank Stadium	Recap
2	August 17	Detroit Lions	L 23–24	0–2	Arrowhead Stadium	Recap
3	August 22	Chicago Bears	L 21–34	0–3	Arrowhead Stadium	Recap

=== Game summaries ===
==== Preseason Week 1: at Jacksonville Jaguars ====
Preseason Week 1: Kansas City Chiefs at Jacksonville Jaguars – Game summary

Quarter	1	2	3	4	Total
Chiefs	3	7	0	3	13
Jaguars	7	13	3	3	26

at EverBank Stadium, Jacksonville, Florida

- Date: August 10
- Game time: 7:00 p.m. EDT/6:00 p.m. CDT
- Game weather: 91 °F (33 °C)
- Game attendance: 61,845
- Referee: Tra Blake
- TV announcers (KMCI): Ari Wolfe, Trent Green and Matt McMullen
- Recap, Game Book

Game information

First quarter

- KC – Harrison Butker 45-yard field goal, 11:58. Chiefs 3–0. Drive: 7 plays, 43 yards, 2:02.
- JAX – Travis Etienne 9-yard pass from Trevor Lawrence (Cam Little kick), 9:40. Jaguars 7–3. Drive: 4 plays, 20 yards, 2:18.

Second quarter

- JAX – Cam Little 40-yard field goal, 14:10. Jaguars 10–3. Drive: 8 plays, 68 yards, 3:23.
- KC – Carson Steele 1-yard run (Harrison Butker kick), 1:55. Tied 10–10. Drive: 16 plays, 82 yards, 8:23.
- JAX – Devin Duvernay 35-yard pass from C. J. Beathard (D'Ernest Johnson run), 0:26. Jaguars 18–10. Drive: 5 plays, 80 yards, 1:29.
- JAX – Mecole Hardman tackled in end zone for a Safety, 0:25. Jaguars 20–10.

Third quarter

- JAX – Cam Little 47-yard field goal, 2:23. Jaguars 23–10. Drive: 7 plays, 56 yards, 4:10.

Fourth quarter

- KC – Harrison Butker 36-yard field goal, 10:16. Jaguars 23–13. Drive: 13 plays, 57 yards, 7:07.
- JAX – Cam Little 31-yard field goal, 3:21. Jaguars 26–13. Drive: 14 plays, 55 yards, :55.

Top passers

- KC – Chris Oladokun – 7/10, 85 yards
- JAX – C. J. Beathard – 7/14, 125 yards, TD

Top rushers

- KC – Carson Steele – 4 rushes, 29 yards, TD
- JAX – D'Ernest Johnson – 5 rushes, 31 yards

Top receivers

- KC – Nikko Remigio – 3 receptions, 35 yards
- JAX – Josiah Deguara – 3 receptions, 42 yards

==== Preseason Week 2: vs. Detroit Lions ====
Preseason Week 2: Detroit Lions at Kansas City Chiefs – Game summary

Quarter	1	2	3	4	Total
Lions	0	12	3	9	24
Chiefs	13	3	0	7	23

at Arrowhead Stadium, Kansas City, Missouri

- Date: August 17
- Game time: 3:00 p.m. CDT
- Game weather: 87 °F (31 °C)
- Game attendance: 73,344
- Referee: Land Clark
- TV announcers (KSHB): Ari Wolfe, Trent Green and Matt McMullen
- Recap, Game Book

Game information

First quarter

- KC – Harrison Butker 33-yard field goal, 11:58. Chiefs 3–0. Drive: 8 plays, 61 yards, 2:44.
- KC – Harrison Butker 37-yard field goal, 3:21. Chiefs 6–0. Drive: 12 plays, 51 yards, 5:13.
- KC – Xavier Worthy 22-yard pass from Carson Wentz (Harrison Butker kick), 1:47. Chiefs 13–0. Drive: 3 plays, 25 yards, 1:26.

Second quarter

- DET – Jake Bates 55-yard field goal, 14:12. Chiefs 13–3. Drive: 7 plays, 33 yards, 2:35.
- DET – Kaden Davis 61-yard pass from Nate Sudfeld (kick failed, wide left), 6:52. Chiefs 13–9. Drive: 4 plays, 89 yards, 2:05.
- KC – Harrison Butker 56-yard field goal, 4:00. Chiefs 16–9. Drive: 5 plays, 27 yards, 2:52.
- DET – Jake Bates 23-yard field goal, 0:08. Chiefs 16–12. Drive: 15 plays, 83 yards, 2:05.

Third quarter

- DET – Jake Bates 32-yard field goal, 3:15. Chiefs 16–15. Drive: 14 plays, 75 yards, 6:59.

Fourth quarter

- KC – Cornell Powell 64-yard pass from Chris Oladokun (Harrison Butker kick), 9:25. Chiefs 23–15. Drive: 3 plays, 84 yards, 1:32.
- DET – Hendon Hooker 7-yard run (pass failed), 5:29. Chiefs 23–21. Drive: 7 plays, 70 yards, 3:56.
- DET – Jake Bates 43-yard field goal, 0:00. Lions 24–23. Drive: 5 plays, 14 yards, 1:44.

Top passers

- DET – Nate Sudfeld – 14/27, 196 yards, TD, INT
- KC – Chris Oladokun – 6/7, 99 yards, TD

Top rushers

- DET – Zonovan Knight – 8 rushes, 36 yards
- KC – Deneric Prince – 7 rushes, 47 yards

Top receivers

- DET – Isaiah Williams – 6 receptions, 71 yards
- KC – Cornell Powell – 1 reception, 64 yards, TD

==== Preseason Week 3: vs. Chicago Bears ====
Preseason Week 3: Chicago Bears at Kansas City Chiefs – Game summary

Quarter	1	2	3	4	Total
Bears	7	13	14	0	34
Chiefs	0	7	0	14	21

at Arrowhead Stadium, Kansas City, Missouri

- Date: August 22
- Game time: 7:15 p.m. CDT
- Game weather: 78 °F (26 °C)
- Game attendance: 72,717
- Referee: Clete Blakeman
- TV announcers (KMCI): Ari Wolfe, Trent Green and Matt McMullen
- Recap, Game Book

Game information

First quarter

- CHI – Tyson Bagent 5-yard run (Cairo Santos kick), 11:23. Bears 7–0. Drive: 7 plays, 73 yards, 3:37.

Second quarter

- CHI – Cairo Santos 32-yard field goal, 14:06. Bears 10–0. Drive: 10 plays, 37 yards, 5:01.
- KC – Carson Steele 1-yard run (Harrison Butker kick), 7:50. Bears 10–7. Drive: 3 plays, 50 yards, 1:07.
- CHI – Cairo Santos 37-yard field goal, 0:43. Bears 13–7. Drive: 7 plays, 54 yards, 1:43.
- CHI – Reddy Steward 48-yard interception return (Cairo Santos kick), 0:22. Bears 20–7.

Third quarter

- CHI – Tommy Sweeney 6-yard pass from Austin Reed (Cairo Santos kick), 6:19. Bears 27–7. Drive: 11 plays, 92 yards, 6:01.
- CHI – Velus Jones Jr. 39-yard run (Cairo Santos kick), 0:28. Bears 34–7. Drive: 7 plays, 66 yards, 3:45.

Fourth quarter

- KC – Cornell Powell 7-yard pass from Ian Book (Harrison Butker kick), 10:27. Bears 34–14. Drive: 10 plays, 65 yards, 5:01.
- KC – Baylor Cupp 10-yard pass from Ian Book (Harrison Butker kick), 3:29. Bears 34–21. Drive: 3 plays, 63 yards, 1:38.

Top passers

- CHI – Brett Rypien – 9/13, 106 yards
- KC – Ian Book – 6/9, 71 yards, 2 TD

Top rushers

- CHI – Velus Jones Jr. – 13 rushes, 111 yards, TD
- KC – Carson Steele – 4 rushes, 50 yards, TD

Top receivers

- CHI – Tyler Scott – 6 receptions, 99 yards
- KC – Montrell Washington – 1 reception, 49 yards

== Regular season ==
=== Schedule ===
Week	Date	Opponent	Result	Record	Venue	Recap
1	September 5	Baltimore Ravens	**W** 27–20	1–0	Arrowhead Stadium	Recap
2	September 15	Cincinnati Bengals	**W** 26–25	2–0	Arrowhead Stadium	Recap
3	September 22	at Atlanta Falcons	**W** 22–17	3–0	Mercedes-Benz Stadium	Recap
4	September 29	at **Los Angeles Chargers**	**W** 17–10	4–0	SoFi Stadium	Recap
5	October 7	New Orleans Saints	**W** 26–13	5–0	Arrowhead Stadium	Recap
6	Bye					
7	October 20	at San Francisco 49ers	**W** 28–18	6–0	Levi's Stadium	Recap
8	October 27	at **Las Vegas Raiders**	**W** 27–20	7–0	Allegiant Stadium	Recap
9	November 4	Tampa Bay Buccaneers	**W** 30–24 (OT)	8–0	Arrowhead Stadium	Recap
10	November 10	**Denver Broncos**	**W** 16–14	9–0	Arrowhead Stadium	Recap
11	November 17	at Buffalo Bills	**L** 21–30	9–1	Highmark Stadium	Recap
12	November 24	at Carolina Panthers	**W** 30–27	10–1	Bank of America Stadium	Recap
13	November 29	**Las Vegas Raiders**	**W** 19–17	11–1	Arrowhead Stadium	Recap
14	December 8	**Los Angeles Chargers**	**W** 19–17	12–1	Arrowhead Stadium	Recap
15	December 15	at Cleveland Browns	**W** 21–7	13–1	Huntington Bank Field	Recap
16	December 21	Houston Texans	**W** 27–19	14–1	Arrowhead Stadium	Recap
17	December 25	at Pittsburgh Steelers	**W** 29–10	15–1	Acrisure Stadium	Recap
18	January 5	at **Denver Broncos**	**L** 0–38	15–2	Empower Field at Mile High	Recap

Note: Intra-division opponents are in bold text.

=== Game summaries ===
==== Week 1: vs. Baltimore Ravens ====
NFL Kickoff Game

Week 1: Baltimore Ravens at Kansas City Chiefs – Game summary

Quarter	1	2	3	4	Total
Ravens	7	3	0	10	**20**
**Chiefs**	7	6	7	7	**27**

at Arrowhead Stadium, Kansas City, Missouri

- Date: September 5
- Game time: 7:40 p.m. CDT (Note: Start delayed 20 minutes by lightning policy.)
- Game weather: 67 °F (19 °C)
- Game attendance: 73,611
- Referee: Shawn Hochuli
- TV announcers (NBC): Mike Tirico, Cris Collinsworth and Melissa Stark
- Recap, Game Book

Game information

**First quarter**

- BAL – Derrick Henry 5-yard run (Justin Tucker kick), 8:14. Ravens 7–0. **Drive: 11 plays, 70 yards, 6:46.**
- KC – Xavier Worthy 21-yard run (Harrison Butker kick), 5:55. Tied 7–7. **Drive: 5 plays, 67 yards, 2:19.**

**Second quarter**

- KC – Harrison Butker 32-yard field goal, 13:37. Chiefs 10–7. **Drive: 4 plays, 1 yard, 1:07.**
- KC – Harrison Butker 31-yard field goal, 5:44. Chiefs 13–7. **Drive: 8 plays, 38 yards, 3:55.**
- BAL – Justin Tucker 25-yard field goal, 0:03. Chiefs 13–10. **Drive: 10 plays, 44 yards, 1:41.**

**Third quarter**

- KC – Isiah Pacheco 1-yard run (Harrison Butker kick), 11:28. Chiefs 20–10. **Drive: 6 plays, 81 yards, 3:32.**

**Fourth quarter**

- BAL – Isaiah Likely 49-yard pass from Lamar Jackson (Justin Tucker kick), 14:47. Chiefs 20–17. **Drive: 7 plays, 80 yards, 3:50.**
- KC – Xavier Worthy 35-yard pass from Patrick Mahomes (Harrison Butker kick), 10:25. Chiefs 27–17. **Drive: 8 plays, 70 yards, 4:22.**
- BAL – Justin Tucker 32-yard field goal, 4:54. Chiefs 27–20. **Drive: 13 plays, 56 yards, 5:31.**

**Top passers**

- BAL – Lamar Jackson – 26/41, 273 yards, TD
- KC – Patrick Mahomes – 20/28, 291 yards, TD, INT

**Top rushers**

- BAL – Lamar Jackson – 16 rushes, 122 yards
- KC – Isiah Pacheco – 15 rushes, 45 yards, TD

**Top receivers**

- BAL – Isaiah Likely – 9 receptions, 111 yards, TD
- KC – Rashee Rice – 7 receptions, 103 yards

The Ravens nearly tied the game at the end of regulation, but Isaiah Likely's initial touchdown call in the end zone was overturned on replay when it showed his toe just barely tapped out of bounds. The Chiefs began their season 1–0.

==== Week 2: vs. Cincinnati Bengals ====
Week 2: Cincinnati Bengals at Kansas City Chiefs – Game summary

Quarter	1	2	3	4	Total
Bengals	3	13	6	3	**25**
**Chiefs**	3	7	7	9	**26**

at Arrowhead Stadium, Kansas City, Missouri

- Date: September 15
- Game time: 3:25 p.m. CDT
- Game weather: 89 °F (32 °C)
- Game attendance: 73,558
- Referee: Alex Kemp
- TV announcers (CBS): Jim Nantz, Tony Romo and Tracy Wolfson
- Recap, Game Book

Game information

**First quarter**

- CIN – Evan McPherson 22-yard field goal, 10:41. Bengals 3–0. **Drive: 10 plays, 66 yards, 4:19.**
- KC – Harrison Butker 19-yard field goal, 2:11. Tied 3–3. **Drive: 16 plays, 69 yards, 8:30.**

**Second quarter**

- CIN – Andrei Iosivas 4-yard pass from Joe Burrow (Evan McPherson kick), 12:04. Bengals 10–3. **Drive: 7 plays, 31 yards, 3:15.**
- KC – Rashee Rice 44-yard pass from Patrick Mahomes (Harrison Butker kick), 8:50. Tied 10–10. **Drive: 6 plays, 70 yards, 3:14.**
- CIN – Evan McPherson 33-yard field goal, 4:19. Bengals 13–10. **Drive: 9 plays, 55 yards, 4:31.**
- CIN – Evan McPherson 48-yard field goal, 1:33. Bengals 16–10. **Drive: 6 plays, 16 yards, 1:28.**

**Third quarter**

- KC – Wanya Morris 1-yard pass from Patrick Mahomes (Harrison Butker kick), 8:21. Chiefs 17–16. **Drive: 13 plays, 70 yards, 6:39.**
- CIN – Andrei Iosivas 3-yard pass from Joe Burrow (kick failed, wide right), 2:16. Bengals 22–17. **Drive: 11 plays, 70 yards, 6:05.**

**Fourth quarter**

- KC – Chamarri Conner 38-yard fumble return (pass failed), 14:40. Chiefs 23–22.
- CIN – Evan McPherson 53-yard field goal, 9:28. Bengals 25–23. **Drive: 8 plays, 33 yards, 5:12.**
- KC – Harrison Butker 51-yard field goal, 0:00. Chiefs 26–25. **Drive: 9 plays, 43 yards, 2:35.**

**Top passers**

- CIN – Joe Burrow – 23/36, 258 yards, 2 TD
- KC – Patrick Mahomes – 18/25, 151 yards, 2 TD, 2 INT

**Top rushers**

- CIN – Zack Moss – 12 rushes, 34 yards
- KC – Isiah Pacheco – 19 rushes, 90 yards

**Top receivers**

- CIN – Mike Gesicki – 7 receptions, 91 yards
- KC – Rashee Rice – 5 receptions, 75 yards, TD

In another close encounter with the Bengals, the Chiefs prevailed on a walk-off field goal as time expired to improve to 2–0 on the season.

==== Week 3: at Atlanta Falcons ====
Week 3: Kansas City Chiefs at Atlanta Falcons – Game summary

Quarter	1	2	3	4	Total
**Chiefs**	0	13	9	0	**22**
Falcons	7	7	0	3	**17**

at Mercedes-Benz Stadium, Atlanta, Georgia

- Date: September 22
- Game time: 8:20 p.m. EDT/7:20 p.m. CDT
- Game weather: Clear, 89 °F (32 °C) (retractable roof open)
- Game attendance: 72,441
- Referee: Tra Blake
- TV announcers (NBC): Mike Tirico, Cris Collinsworth and Melissa Stark
- Recap, Game Book

Game information

**First quarter**

- ATL – Drake London 14-yard pass from Kirk Cousins (Younghoe Koo kick), 11:07. Falcons 7–0. **Drive: 7 plays, 70 yards, 3:53.**

**Second quarter**

- KC – Rashee Rice 13-yard pass from Patrick Mahomes (Harrison Butker kick), 8:45. Tied 7–7. **Drive: 13 plays, 79 yards, 6:15.**
- ATL – Bijan Robinson 1-yard run (Younghoe Koo kick), 6:37. Falcons 14–7. **Drive: 5 plays, 70 yards, 2:08.**
- KC – Harrison Butker 53-yard field goal, 2:43. Falcons 14–10. **Drive: 7 plays, 34 yards, 3:54.**
- KC – Harrison Butker 44-yard field goal, 0:06. Falcons 14–13. **Drive: 4 plays, 8 yards, 0:26.**

**Third quarter**

- KC – Harrison Butker 21-yard field goal, 9:40. Chiefs 16–14. **Drive: 11 plays, 67 yards, 5:20.**
- KC – JuJu Smith-Schuster 13-yard pass from Patrick Mahomes (kick failed, hit right upright), 1:16. Chiefs 22–14. **Drive: 11 plays, 80 yards, 6:04.**

**Fourth quarter**

- ATL – Younghoe Koo 54-yard field goal, 12:52. Chiefs 22–17. **Drive: 10 plays, 49 yards, 3:24.**

**Top passers**

- KC – Patrick Mahomes – 26/39, 217 yards, 2 TD, INT
- ATL – Kirk Cousins – 20/29, 230 yards, TD, INT

**Top rushers**

- KC – Carson Steele – 17 rushes, 72 yards
- ATL – Tyler Allgeier – 7 rushes, 32 yards

**Top receivers**

- KC – Rashee Rice – 12 receptions, 110 yards, TD
- ATL – Drake London – 6 receptions, 67 yards, TD

The Chiefs outlasted the Falcons on the road to improve to 3–0 on the season.

==== Week 4: at Los Angeles Chargers ====
Week 4: Kansas City Chiefs at Los Angeles Chargers – Game summary

Quarter	1	2	3	4	Total
**Chiefs**	0	7	3	7	**17**
Chargers	10	0	0	0	**10**

at SoFi Stadium, Inglewood, California

- Date: September 29
- Game time: 3:25 p.m. CDT/1:25 p.m. PDT
- Game weather: Sunny, 68 °F (20 °C) (fixed roof)
- Game attendance: 70,240
- Referee: Shawn Smith
- TV announcers (CBS): Jim Nantz, Tony Romo and Tracy Wolfson
- Recap, Game Book

Game information

**First quarter**

- LAC – Ladd McConkey 7-yard pass from Justin Herbert (Cameron Dicker kick), 6:16. Chargers 7–0. **Drive: 10 plays, 74 yards, 6:36.**
- LAC – Cameron Dicker 50-yard field goal, 3:53. Chargers 10–0. **Drive: 4 plays, −12 yards, 2:13.**

**Second quarter**

- KC – Xavier Worthy 54-yard pass from Patrick Mahomes (Harrison Butker kick), 4:06. Chargers 10–7. **Drive: 1 play, 54 yards, 0:08.**

**Third quarter**

- KC – Harrison Butker 37-yard field goal, 6:26. Tied 10–10. **Drive: 10 plays, 37 yards, 5:20.**

**Fourth quarter**

- KC – Samaje Perine 2-yard run (Harrison Butker kick), 6:04. Chiefs 17–10. **Drive: 5 plays, 60 yards, 2:12.**

**Top passers**

- KC – Patrick Mahomes – 19/29, 245 yards, TD, INT
- LAC – Justin Herbert – 16/27, 179 yards, TD

**Top rushers**

- KC – Kareem Hunt – 14 rushes, 69 yards
- LAC – J. K. Dobbins – 14 rushes, 32 yards

**Top receivers**

- KC – Travis Kelce – 7 receptions, 89 yards
- LAC – Ladd McConkey – 5 receptions, 67 yards, TD

Patrick Mahomes’ 100th regular season start. The Chiefs rallied from a 10-0 deficit to beat the Chargers in California for the 10th consecutive time and improve to 4–0 on the season. Though his first 100 regular season NFL starts, Mahomes was 78-22. That is an NFL record.

==== Week 5: vs. New Orleans Saints ====
Week 5: New Orleans Saints at Kansas City Chiefs – Game summary

Quarter	1	2	3	4	Total
Saints	0	7	0	6	**13**
**Chiefs**	7	9	0	10	**26**

at Arrowhead Stadium, Kansas City, Missouri

- Date: October 7
- Game time: 7:15 p.m. CDT
- Game weather: 70 °F (21 °C)
- Game attendance: 73,592
- Referee: Brad Rogers
- TV announcers (ESPN): Joe Buck, Troy Aikman and Lisa Salters
  Game exclusive to KMBC in Kansas City and WDSU (Hearst owned station) in New Orleans.
- Recap, Game Book

Game information

**First quarter**

- KC – Kareem Hunt 5-yard run (Harrison Butker kick), 6:34. Chiefs 7–0. **Drive: 10 plays, 78 yards, 5:25.**

**Second quarter**

- KC – Harrison Butker 26-yard field goal, 12:39. Chiefs 10–0. **Drive: 10 plays, 52 yards, 4:47.**
- NO – Rashid Shaheed 43-yard pass from Derek Carr (Blake Grupe kick), 8:36. Chiefs 10–7. **Drive: 7 plays, 74 yards, 4:03.**
- KC – Harrison Butker 34-yard field goal, 1:32. Chiefs 13–7. **Drive: 15 plays, 64 yards, 7:04.**
- KC – Harrison Butker 28-yard field goal, 0:06. Chiefs 16–7. **Drive: 9 plays, 55 yards, 0:52.**

**Third quarter**

- No scoring plays.

**Fourth quarter**

- NO – Foster Moreau 6-yard pass from Derek Carr (kick failed, wide left), 14:16. Chiefs 16–13. **Drive: 8 plays, 65 yards, 2:27.**
- KC – Xavier Worthy 3-yard run (Harrison Butker kick), 11:56. Chiefs 23–13. **Drive: 5 plays, 68 yards, 2:20.**
- KC – Harrison Butker 38-yard field goal, 3:03. Chiefs 26–13. **Drive: 11 plays, 38 yards, 6:29.**

**Top passers**

- NO – Derek Carr – 18/28, 165 yards, 2 TD, INT
- KC – Patrick Mahomes – 28/39, 331 yards, INT

**Top rushers**

- NO – Alvin Kamara – 11 rushes, 26 yards
- KC – Kareem Hunt – 27 rushes, 102 yards, TD

**Top receivers**

- NO – Rashid Shaheed – 4 receptions, 86 yards, TD
- KC – JuJu Smith-Schuster – 7 receptions, 130 yards

The Chiefs defeated the Saints for the 4th consecutive meeting and improved to 5–0 on the season.

==== Week 7: at San Francisco 49ers ====
Week 7: Kansas City Chiefs at San Francisco 49ers – Game summary

Quarter	1	2	3	4	Total
**Chiefs**	0	14	0	14	**28**
49ers	3	3	6	6	**18**

at Levi's Stadium, Santa Clara, California

- Date: October 20
- Game time: 3:25 p.m. CDT/1:25 p.m. PDT
- Game weather: Sunny, 77 °F (25 °C)
- Game attendance: 71,309
- Referee: Alan Eck
- TV announcers (Fox): Kevin Burkhardt, Tom Brady, Erin Andrews and Tom Rinaldi
- Recap, Game Book

Game information

**First quarter**

- SF – Anders Carlson 55-yard field goal, 1:06. 49ers 3–0. **Drive: 4 plays, 22 yards, 0:59.**

**Second quarter**

- KC – Kareem Hunt 1-yard run (Harrison Butker kick), 11:24. Chiefs 7–3. **Drive: 7 plays, 70 yards, 4:42.**
- KC – Kareem Hunt 6-yard run (Harrison Butker kick), 6:45. Chiefs 14–3. **Drive: 7 plays, 30 yards, 3:36.**
- SF – Anders Carlson 24-yard field goal, 0:00. Chiefs 14–6. **Drive: 9 plays, 84 yards, 1:39.**

**Third quarter**

- SF – Brock Purdy 1-yard run (kick failed, hit left upright), 10:29. Chiefs 14–12. **Drive: 7 plays, 23 yards, 3:26.**

**Fourth quarter**

- KC – Patrick Mahomes 1-yard run (Harrison Butker kick), 14:13. Chiefs 21–12. **Drive: 13 plays, 79 yards, 6:43.**
- KC – Mecole Hardman 18-yard run (Harrison Butker kick), 3:09. Chiefs 28–12. **Drive: 12 plays, 80 yards, 6:20.**
- SF – Brock Purdy 1-yard run (pass failed), 1:08. Chiefs 28–18. **Drive: 8 plays, 65 yards, 2:01.**

**Top passers**

- KC – Patrick Mahomes – 16/27, 154 yards, 2 INT
- SF – Brock Purdy – 17/31, 212 yards, 3 INT

**Top rushers**

- KC – Kareem Hunt – 22 rushes, 78 yards, 2 TD
- SF – Jordan Mason – 14 rushes, 58 yards

**Top receivers**

- KC – Noah Gray – 4 receptions, 66 yards
- SF – George Kittle – 6 receptions, 92 yards

In a rematch of Super Bowl LVIII, the Chiefs once again outlasted San Francisco 28–18 and improved to 6–0 on the season.

==== Week 8: at Las Vegas Raiders ====
Week 8: Kansas City Chiefs at Las Vegas Raiders – Game summary

Quarter	1	2	3	4	Total
**Chiefs**	7	10	0	10	**27**
Raiders	7	3	3	7	**20**

at Allegiant Stadium, Paradise, Nevada

- Date: October 27
- Game time: 3:25 p.m. CDT/1:25 p.m. PDT
- Game weather: None (indoor stadium)
- Game attendance: 62,533
- Referee: Adrian Hill
- TV announcers (CBS): Kevin Harlan, Trent Green and Melanie Collins
- Recap, Game Book

Game information

**First quarter**

- KC – Kareem Hunt 1-yard run (Harrison Butker kick), 10:02. Chiefs 7–0. **Drive: 9 plays, 70 yards, 4:58.**
- LV – Jakobi Meyers 7-yard pass from Gardner Minshew (Daniel Carlson kick), 2:39. Tied 7–7. **Drive: 12 plays, 70 yards, 7:23.**

**Second quarter**

- LV – Daniel Carlson 54-yard field goal, 10:13. Raiders 10–7. **Drive: 10 plays, 50 yards, 5:46.**
- KC – Travis Kelce 5-yard pass from Patrick Mahomes (Harrison Butker kick), 1:57. Chiefs 14–10. **Drive: 13 plays, 70 yards, 8:16.**
- KC – Harrison Butker 42-yard field goal, 0:04. Chiefs 17–10. **Drive: 9 plays, 56 yards, 0:54.**

**Third quarter**

- LV – Daniel Carlson 32-yard field goal, 6:40. Chiefs 17–13. **Drive: 10 plays, 14 yards, 5:51.**

**Fourth quarter**

- KC – Harrison Butker 24-yard field goal, 8:44. Chiefs 20–13. **Drive: 19 plays, 87 yards, 9:43.**
- KC – Xavier Worthy 9-yard pass from Patrick Mahomes (Harrison Butker kick), 4:59. Chiefs 27–13. **Drive: 8 plays, 38 yards, 3:01.**
- LV – D. J. Turner 11-yard pass from Gardner Minshew (Daniel Carlson kick), 2:39. Chiefs 27–20. **Drive: 12 plays, 70 yards, 7:23.**

**Top passers**

- KC – Patrick Mahomes – 27/38, 262 yards, 2 TD, INT
- LV – Gardner Minshew – 24/30, 209 yards, 2 TD

**Top rushers**

- KC – Kareem Hunt – 21 rushes, 59 yards, TD
- LV – Alexander Mattison – 14 rushes, 15 yards

**Top receivers**

- KC – Travis Kelce – 10 receptions, 90 yards, TD
- LV – Brock Bowers – 5 receptions, 58 yards

In a surprisingly close game, the Chiefs prevailed and defeated the Raiders on the road for the 7th consecutive meeting and improved to 7–0 on the season.

==== Week 9: vs. Tampa Bay Buccaneers ====
Week 9: Tampa Bay Buccaneers at Kansas City Chiefs – Game summary

Quarter	1	2	3	4	OT	Total
Buccaneers	0	7	10	7	0	**24**
**Chiefs**	3	7	0	14	6	**30**

at Arrowhead Stadium, Kansas City, Missouri

- Date: November 4
- Game time: 7:15 p.m. CST
- Game weather: 63 °F (17 °C)
- Game attendance: 73,574
- Referee: John Hussey
- TV announcers (ESPN/ABC): Joe Buck, Troy Aikman, Lisa Salters and Laura Rutledge
- Recap, Game Book

Game information

**First quarter**

- KC – Harrison Butker 40-yard field goal, 2:16. Chiefs 3–0. **Drive: 8 plays, 33 yards, 4:34.**

**Second quarter**

- TB – Rachaad White 7-yard run (Chase McLaughlin kick), 10:23. Buccaneers 7–3. **Drive: 11 plays, 70 yards, 6:53.**
- KC – DeAndre Hopkins 1-yard pass from Patrick Mahomes (Harrison Butker kick), 4:05. Chiefs 10–7. **Drive: 11 plays, 70 yards, 6:18.**

**Third quarter**

- TB – Cade Otton 11-yard pass from Baker Mayfield (Chase McLaughlin kick), 11:36. Buccaneers 14–10. **Drive: 6 plays, 51 yards, 3:24.**
- TB – Chase McLaughlin 47-yard field goal, 5:50. Buccaneers 17–10. **Drive: 8 plays, 30 yards, 4:41.**

**Fourth quarter**

- KC – Samaje Perine 7-yard pass from Patrick Mahomes (Harrison Butker kick), 14:14. Tied 17–17. **Drive: 12 plays, 70 yards, 6:36.**
- KC – DeAndre Hopkins 5-yard pass from Patrick Mahomes (Harrison Butker kick), 4:17. Chiefs 24–17. **Drive: 15 plays, 78 yards, 8:26.**
- TB – Ryan Miller 1-yard pass from Baker Mayfield (Chase McLaughlin kick), 0:27. Tied 24–24. **Drive: 10 plays, 71 yards, 1:49.**

**Overtime**

- KC – Kareem Hunt 2-yard run, 4:08. Chiefs 30–24. **Drive: 10 plays, 70 yards, 5:52.**

**Top passers**

- TB – Baker Mayfield – 23/31, 200 yards, TD
- KC – Patrick Mahomes – 34/44, 291 yards, 3 TD

**Top rushers**

- TB – Bucky Irving – 7 rushes, 24 yards
- KC – Kareem Hunt – 27 rushes, 106 yards, TD

**Top receivers**

- TB – Cade Otton – 8 receptions, 77 yards, TD
- KC – Travis Kelce – 14 receptions, 100 yards

In an overtime thriller against the Buccanneers, the Chiefs thwarted a comeback attempt and won in overtime and improved to 8–0 on the season.

==== Week 10: vs. Denver Broncos ====
Week 10: Denver Broncos at Kansas City Chiefs – Game summary

Quarter	1	2	3	4	Total
Broncos	0	14	0	0	**14**
**Chiefs**	0	10	3	3	**16**

at Arrowhead Stadium, Kansas City, Missouri

- Date: November 10
- Game time: 12:00 p.m. CST
- Game weather: 57 °F (14 °C)
- Game attendance: 73,704
- Referee: Brad Allen
- TV announcers (CBS): Kevin Harlan, Trent Green and Melanie Collins
- Recap, Game Book

Game information

**First quarter**

- No scoring plays.

**Second quarter**

- DEN – Devaughn Vele 6-yard pass from Bo Nix (Wil Lutz kick), 14:20. Broncos 7–0. **Drive: 9 plays, 80 yards, 4:40.**
- KC – Harrison Butker 36-yard field goal, 9:02. Broncos 7–3. **Drive: 10 plays, 52 yards, 5:18.**
- DEN – Courtland Sutton 32-yard pass from Bo Nix (Wil Lutz kick), 6:39. Broncos 14–3. **Drive: 5 plays, 70 yards, 2:23.**
- KC – Travis Kelce 2-yard pass from Patrick Mahomes (Harrison Butker kick), 1:44. Broncos 14–10. **Drive: 11 plays, 70 yards, 4:55.**

**Third quarter**

- KC – Harrison Butker 28-yard field goal, 3:51. Broncos 14–13. **Drive: 16 plays, 65 yards, 7:16.**

**Fourth quarter**

- KC – Harrison Butker 20-yard field goal, 5:57. Chiefs 16–14. **Drive: 10 plays, 44 yards, 4:43.**

**Top passers**

- DEN – Bo Nix – 22/30, 215 yards, 2 TD
- KC – Patrick Mahomes – 28/42, 266 yards, TD

**Top rushers**

- DEN – Audric Estimé – 14 rushes, 53 yards
- KC – Kareem Hunt – 14 rushes, 35 yards

**Top receivers**

- DEN – Courtland Sutton – 6 receptions, 70 yards, TD
- KC – Kareem Hunt – 7 receptions, 65 yards

The Chiefs blocked a game winning field goal attempt by Wil Lutz and improved their record to 9–0 and won their 15th straight game over the Broncos, tied for the 3rd longest winning streak over one opponent in NFL history. Patrick Mahomes also improved to 11–0 in his career against Denver.

==== Week 11: at Buffalo Bills ====
Week 11: Kansas City Chiefs at Buffalo Bills – Game summary

Quarter	1	2	3	4	Total
Chiefs	0	14	0	7	**21**
**Bills**	6	10	0	14	**30**

at Highmark Stadium, Orchard Park, New York

- Date: November 17
- Game time: 4:25 p.m. EST/3:25 p.m. CST
- Game weather: Cloudy, 50 °F (10 °C)
- Game attendance: 71,112
- Referee: Land Clark
- TV announcers (CBS): Jim Nantz, Tony Romo and Tracy Wolfson
- Recap, Game Book

Game information

**First quarter**

- BUF – James Cook 3-yard run (kick failed, wide right), 10:00. Bills 6–0. **Drive: 8 plays, 65 yards, 4:15.**

**Second quarter**

- KC – Xavier Worthy 10-yard pass from Patrick Mahomes (Spencer Shrader kick), 14:53. Chiefs 7–6. **Drive: 11 plays, 88 yards, 5:27.**
- BUF – James Cook 6-yard run (Tyler Bass kick), 10:06. Bills 13–7. **Drive: 9 plays, 70 yards, 4:45.**
- KC – Noah Gray 2-yard pass from Patrick Mahomes (Spencer Shrader kick), 2:51. Chiefs 14–13. **Drive: 9 plays, 40 yards, 4:34.**
- BUF – Tyler Bass 33-yard field goal, 0:00. Bills 16–14. **Drive: 12 plays, 62 yards, 2:51.**

**Third quarter**

- No scoring plays.

**Fourth quarter**

- BUF – Curtis Samuel 12-yard pass from Josh Allen (Tyler Bass kick), 12:51. Bills 23–14. **Drive: 10 plays, 83 yards, 6:03.**
- KC – Noah Gray 1-yard pass from Patrick Mahomes (Spencer Shrader kick), 7:53. Bills 23–21. **Drive: 10 plays, 70 yards, 4:58.**
- BUF – Josh Allen 26-yard run (Tyler Bass kick), 2:17. Bills 30–21. **Drive: 12 plays, 70 yards, 5:36.**

**Top passers**

- KC – Patrick Mahomes – 23/33, 196 yards, 3 TD, 2 INT
- BUF – Josh Allen – 27/40, 262 yards, TD, INT

**Top rushers**

- KC – Kareem Hunt – 14 rushes, 60 yards
- BUF – Josh Allen – 12 rushes, 55 yards, TD

**Top receivers**

- KC – Xavier Worthy – 4 receptions, 61 yards, TD
- BUF – Khalil Shakir – 8 receptions, 70 yards

With the loss, the Chiefs fell to 9–1, became the final undefeated team in the 2024 regular season to lose a game, and failed to become the first NFL team to start a season 10–0 since the 2020 Pittsburgh Steelers.

The game was watched by 31.2 million viewers, becoming the highest-rated football game of the 2024 NFL season. It was the highest-rated regular season and non-holiday game since the Week 9 matchup of the New England Patriots and Indianapolis Colts during the 2007 NFL season.

==== Week 12: at Carolina Panthers ====
Week 12: Kansas City Chiefs at Carolina Panthers – Game summary

Quarter	1	2	3	4	Total
**Chiefs**	10	10	7	3	**30**
Panthers	3	6	7	11	**27**

at Bank of America Stadium, Charlotte, North Carolina

- Date: November 24
- Game time: 1:00 p.m. EST/12:00 p.m. CST
- Game weather: Sunny, 61 °F (16 °C)
- Game attendance: 73,216
- Referee: Shawn Smith
- TV announcers (CBS): Ian Eagle, Charles Davis and Evan Washburn
- Recap, Game Book

Game information

**First quarter**

- KC – Noah Gray 35-yard pass from Patrick Mahomes (Spencer Shrader kick), 13:35. Chiefs 7–0. **Drive: 3 plays, 41 yards, 1:25.**
- CAR – Eddy Piñeiro 30-yard field goal, 9:24. Chiefs 7–3. **Drive: 8 plays, 58 yards, 4:11.**
- KC – Spencer Shrader 25-yard field goal, 2:39. Chiefs 10–3. **Drive: 11 plays, 68 yards, 6:45.**

**Second quarter**

- CAR – Eddy Piñeiro 32-yard field goal, 14:42. Chiefs 10–6. **Drive: 8 plays, 57 yards, 2:57.**
- KC – Spencer Shrader 41-yard field goal, 7:24. Chiefs 13–6. **Drive: 14 plays, 47 yards, 7:18.**
- KC – Noah Gray 11-yard pass from Patrick Mahomes (Spencer Shrader kick), 0:47. Chiefs 20–6. **Drive: 14 plays, 92 yards, 4:30.**
- CAR – Eddy Piñeiro 29-yard field goal, 0:00. Chiefs 20–9. **Drive: 8 plays, 59 yards, 0:44.**

**Third quarter**

- CAR – David Moore 1-yard pass from Bryce Young (Eddy Piñeiro kick), 6:26. Chiefs 20–16. **Drive: 15 plays, 70 yards, 8:34.**
- KC – DeAndre Hopkins 3-yard pass from Patrick Mahomes (Spencer Shrader kick), 2:42. Chiefs 27–16. **Drive: 10 plays, 75 yards, 3:44.**

**Fourth quarter**

- CAR – Eddy Piñeiro 33-yard field goal, 12:37. Chiefs 27–19. **Drive: 11 plays, 55 yards, 5:05.**
- CAR – Chuba Hubbard 1-yard run (Chuba Hubbard run), 1:46. Tied 27–27. **Drive: 5 plays, 49 yards, 1:35.**
- KC – Spencer Shrader 33-yard field goal, 0:00. Chiefs 30–27. **Drive: 7 plays, 57 yards, 1:46.**

**Top passers**

- KC – Patrick Mahomes – 27/37, 269 yards, 3 TD
- CAR – Bryce Young – 21/35, 262 yards, TD

**Top rushers**

- KC – Kareem Hunt – 16 rushes, 68 yards
- CAR – Chuba Hubbard – 16 rushes, 59 yards, TD

**Top receivers**

- KC – Noah Gray – 4 receptions, 66 yards, TD
- CAR – David Moore – 6 receptions, 80 yards, TD

The Chiefs rebounded from their first loss by defeating the Panthers on the road and improved their record to 10–1.

==== Week 13: vs. Las Vegas Raiders ====
Black Friday games

Week 13: Las Vegas Raiders at Kansas City Chiefs – Game summary

Quarter	1	2	3	4	Total
Raiders	0	3	7	7	**17**
**Chiefs**	3	7	6	3	**19**

at Arrowhead Stadium, Kansas City, Missouri

- Date: November 29
- Game time: 2:00 p.m. CST
- Game weather: 37 °F (3 °C)
- Game attendance: 73,627
- Referee: Clay Martin
- TV announcers (Prime Video): Al Michaels, Kirk Herbstreit and Kaylee Hartung
  Game exclusive to KSHB in Chiefs market.
- Recap, Game Book

Game information

**First quarter**

- KC – Matthew Wright 25-yard field goal, 10:06. Chiefs 3–0. **Drive: 13 plays, 66 yards, 4:54.**

**Second quarter**

- LV – Daniel Carlson 27-yard field goal, 11:03. Tied 3–3. **Drive: 10 plays, 83 yards, 6:20.**
- KC – Justin Watson 6-yard pass from Patrick Mahomes (Matthew Wright kick), 2:14. Chiefs 10–3. **Drive: 7 plays, 75 yards, 2:30.**

**Third quarter**

- KC – Matthew Wright 42-yard field goal, 8:40. Chiefs 13–3. **Drive: 7 plays, 47 yards, 3:05.**
- KC – Matthew Wright 35-yard field goal, 3:11. Chiefs 16–3. **Drive: 7 plays, 38 yards, 1:17.**
- LV – Brock Bowers 33-yard pass from Aidan O'Connell (Daniel Carlson kick), 1:40. Chiefs 16–10. **Drive: 2 plays, 26 yards, 1:31.**

**Fourth quarter**

- LV – Tre Tucker 58-yard pass from Aidan O'Connell (Daniel Carlson kick), 14:52. Raiders 17–16. **Drive: 2 plays, 69 yards, 0:13.**
- KC – Matthew Wright 32-yard field goal, 9:53. Chiefs 19–17. **Drive: 11 plays, 56 yards, 5:59.**

**Top passers**

- LV – Aidan O'Connell – 23/35, 340 yards, 2 TD
- KC – Patrick Mahomes – 26/46, 306 yards, TD

**Top rushers**

- LV – Sincere McCormick – 12 rushes, 64 yards
- KC – Isiah Pacheco – 7 rushes, 44 yards

**Top receivers**

- LV – Brock Bowers – 10 receptions, 140 yards, TD
- KC – DeAndre Hopkins – 4 receptions, 90 yards

In another surprisingly close encounter with the Raiders, the Chiefs prevailed again thanks to 3 missed field goals by Daniel Carlson as well as a botched snap by Aidan O'Connell late with the Raiders in field goal range. The Chiefs improved to 11–1 on the season.

==== Week 14: vs. Los Angeles Chargers ====
Week 14: Los Angeles Chargers at Kansas City Chiefs – Game summary

Quarter	1	2	3	4	Total
Chargers	0	0	14	3	**17**
**Chiefs**	3	10	0	6	**19**

at Arrowhead Stadium, Kansas City, Missouri

- Date: December 8
- Game time: 7:20 p.m. CST
- Game weather: 50 °F (10 °C)
- Game attendance: 73,571
- Referee: Bill Vinovich
- TV announcers (NBC): Mike Tirico, Cris Collinsworth and Melissa Stark
- Recap, Game Book

Game information

**First quarter**

- KC – Matthew Wright 47-yard field goal, 10:05. Chiefs 3–0. **Drive: 11 plays, 34 yards, 4:55.**

**Second quarter**

- KC – Matthew Wright 33-yard field goal, 7:47. Chiefs 6–0. **Drive: 7 plays, 40 yards, 3:33.**
- KC – DeAndre Hopkins 9-yard pass from Patrick Mahomes (Matthew Wright kick), 0:47. Chiefs 13–0. **Drive: 9 plays, 77 yards, 2:41.**

**Third quarter**

- LAC – Gus Edwards 3-yard run (Cameron Dicker kick), 7:12. Chiefs 13–7. **Drive: 13 plays, 79 yards, 7:48.**
- LAC – Quentin Johnston 4-yard pass from Justin Herbert (Cameron Dicker kick), 3:30. Chargers 14–13. **Drive: 4 plays, 74 yards, 2:12.**

**Fourth quarter**

- KC – Matthew Wright 50-yard field goal, 13:04. Chiefs 16–14. **Drive: 12 plays, 45 yards, 5:26.**
- LAC – Cameron Dicker 37-yard field goal, 4:35. Chargers 17–16. **Drive: 14 plays, 57 yards, 8:29.**
- KC – Matthew Wright 31-yard field goal, 0:00. Chiefs 19–17. **Drive: 14 plays, 47 yards, 4:35.**

**Top passers**

- LAC – Justin Hebert – 21/30, 213 yards, TD
- KC – Patrick Mahomes – 24/37, 210 yards, TD

**Top rushers**

- LAC – Gus Edwards – 10 rushes, 36 yards, TD
- KC – Isiah Pacheco – 14 rushes, 55 yards

**Top receivers**

- LAC – Josh Palmer – 6 receptions, 78 yards
- KC – Travis Kelce – 5 receptions, 45 yards

The Chiefs won their 9th straight AFC West Division title on a walk off field goal by Harrison Butker and improved to 12–1 on the season.

==== Week 15: at Cleveland Browns ====
Week 15: Kansas City Chiefs at Cleveland Browns – Game summary

Quarter	1	2	3	4	Total
**Chiefs**	7	7	7	0	**21**
Browns	0	0	7	0	**7**

at Huntington Bank Field, Cleveland, Ohio

- Date: December 15
- Game time: 1:00 p.m. EST/12:00 p.m. CST
- Game weather: Cloudy, 40 °F (4 °C)
- Game attendance: 67,983
- Referee: Tra Blake
- TV announcers (CBS): Ian Eagle, Charles Davis and Evan Washburn
- Recap, Game Book

Game information

**First quarter**

- KC – JuJu Smith-Schuster 7-yard pass from Patrick Mahomes (Harrison Butker kick), 12:12. Chiefs 7–0. **Drive: 3 plays, 21 yards, 1:22.**

**Second quarter**

- KC – Noah Gray 6-yard pass from Patrick Mahomes (Harrison Butker kick), 4:46. Chiefs 14–0. **Drive: 14 plays, 87 yards, 6:56.**

**Third quarter**

- KC – Xavier Worthy 21-yard run (Harrison Butker kick), 12:59. Chiefs 21–0. **Drive: 4 plays, 34 yards, 1:47.**
- CLE – Jerome Ford 62-yard run (Riley Patterson kick), 3:16. Chiefs 21–7. **Drive: 2 plays, 49 yards, 0:56.**

**Fourth quarter**

- No scoring plays.

**Top passers**

- KC – Patrick Mahomes – 19/38, 159 yards, 2 TD
- CLE – Jameis Winston – 16/25, 146 yards, 3 INT

**Top rushers**

- KC – Kareem Hunt – 13 rushes, 45 yards
- CLE – Jerome Ford – 7 rushes, 84 yards, TD

**Top receivers**

- KC – Xavier Worthy – 6 receptions, 46 yards
- CLE – Jerry Jeudy – 11 receptions, 108 yards

The Chiefs forced 5 turnovers and staved off a Browns upset attempt and improved to 13–1 on the season.

==== Week 16: vs. Houston Texans ====
Week 16: Houston Texans at Kansas City Chiefs – Game summary

Quarter	1	2	3	4	Total
Texans	3	7	6	3	**19**
**Chiefs**	7	10	7	3	**27**

at Arrowhead Stadium, Kansas City, Missouri

- Date: December 21
- Game time: 12:00 p.m. CST
- Game weather: 30 °F (−1 °C)
- Game attendance: 73,600
- Referee: Carl Cheffers
- TV announcers (NBC): Noah Eagle, Todd Blackledge and Kathryn Tappen
- Recap, Game Book

Game information

**First quarter**

- KC – Patrick Mahomes 15-yard run (Harrison Butker kick), 6:31. Chiefs 7–0. **Drive: 11 plays, 66 yards, 6:26.**
- HOU – Kaʻimi Fairbairn 33-yard field goal, 3:08. Chiefs 7–3. **Drive: 7 plays, 55 yards, 3:23.**

**Second quarter**

- HOU – Dalton Schultz 10-yard pass from C. J. Stroud (Kaʻimi Fairbairn kick), 10:09. Texans 10–7. **Drive: 13 plays, 82 yards, 6:05.**
- KC – Kareem Hunt 3-yard run (Harrison Butker kick), 4:38. Chiefs 14–10. **Drive: 13 plays, 82 yards, 5:31.**
- KC – Harrison Butker 44-yard field goal, 0:19. Chiefs 17–10. **Drive: 5 plays, 39 yards, 0:33.**

**Third quarter**

- HOU – Tank Dell 30-yard pass from C. J. Stroud (kick failed, wide right), 11:40. Chiefs 17–16. **Drive: 4 plays, 50 yards, 1:36.**
- KC – Xavier Worthy 8-yard pass from Patrick Mahomes (Harrison Butker kick), 2:42. Chiefs 24–16. **Drive: 10 plays, 80 yards, 5:44.**

**Fourth quarter**

- HOU – Kaʻimi Fairbairn 38-yard field goal, 11:51. Chiefs 24–19. **Drive: 14 plays, 50 yards, 5:51.**
- KC – Harrison Butker 27-yard field goal, 5:18. Chiefs 27–19. **Drive: 14 plays, 60 yards, 6:33.**

**Top passers**

- HOU – C. J. Stroud – 23/39, 244 yards, 2 TD, 2 INT
- KC – Patrick Mahomes – 28/41, 260 yards, TD

**Top rushers**

- HOU – Joe Mixon – 14 rushes, 57 yards
- KC – Kareem Hunt – 11 rushes, 55 yards, TD

**Top receivers**

- HOU – Tank Dell – 6 receptions, 98 yards, TD
- KC – Xavier Worthy – 7 receptions, 65 yards, TD

With the win, the Chiefs improved to 14–1 and went undefeated at home for the first time since 2003.

==== Week 17: at Pittsburgh Steelers ====
Christmas Day games

Week 17: Kansas City Chiefs at Pittsburgh Steelers – Game summary

Quarter	1	2	3	4	Total
**Chiefs**	13	0	3	13	**29**
Steelers	0	7	3	0	**10**

at Acrisure Stadium, Pittsburgh, Pennsylvania

- Date: December 25
- Game time: 1:00 p.m. EST/12:00 p.m. CST
- Game weather: Cloudy, 39 °F (4 °C)
- Game attendance: 67,311
- Referee: Craig Wrolstad
- TV announcers (Netflix): Ian Eagle, Nate Burleson, J. J. Watt, Melanie Collins and Stacey Dales
  Game exclusive to KCTV and KDKA.
- Recap, Game Book

Game information

**First quarter**

- KC – Xavier Worthy 7-yard pass from Patrick Mahomes (kick failed, wide right), 9:19. Chiefs 6–0. **Drive: 8 plays, 42 yards, 3:56.**
- KC – Justin Watson 11-yard pass from Patrick Mahomes (Harrison Butker kick), 4:00. Chiefs 13–0. **Drive: 7 plays, 79 yards, 2:33.**

**Second quarter**

- PIT – Russell Wilson 1-yard run (Chris Boswell kick), 10:28. Chiefs 13–7. **Drive: 11 plays, 72 yards, 5:08.**

**Third quarter**

- KC – Harrison Butker 32-yard field goal, 12:21. Chiefs 16–7. **Drive: 8 plays, 54 yards, 2:39.**
- PIT – Chris Boswell 36-yard field goal, 5:45. Chiefs 16–10. **Drive: 12 plays, 52 yards, 6:36.**

**Fourth quarter**

- KC – Kareem Hunt 2-yard run (pass failed), 14:56. Chiefs 22–10. **Drive: 11 plays, 77 yards, 5:49.**
- KC – Travis Kelce 12-yard pass from Patrick Mahomes (Harrison Butker kick), 12:38. Chiefs 29–10. **Drive: 4 plays, 34 yards, 1:24.**

**Top passers**

- KC – Patrick Mahomes – 29/38, 320 yards, 3 TD
- PIT – Russell Wilson – 22/37, 205 yards, INT

**Top rushers**

- KC – Kareem Hunt – 9 rushes, 20 yards, TD
- PIT – Najee Harris – 13 rushes, 74 yards

**Top receivers**

- KC – Travis Kelce – 8 receptions, 84 yards, TD
- PIT – Pat Freiermuth – 7 receptions, 60 yards

In a Christmas Day game exclusive to KCTV in Kansas City and KDKA in Pittsburgh (and a different out-of-market carrier than normal), the Chiefs improved to 15–1 and swept the entire AFC North with the dominating win. In addition, they gained the No. 1 seed, and clinched a first-round bye as well as home-field advantage throughout the entire AFC playoffs. It was an extra-special day for Travis Kelce, who recorded the 1,000th reception of his career, becoming the 15th player in NFL history to do so. Kelce also scored his 77th touchdown, surpassing legend Tony Gonzalez for the most touchdowns by a single player in Chiefs history. The Chiefs also averaged 6.7 yards per play.

To celebrate the Christmas Day win, head coach Andy Reid disguised himself as Santa Claus, and told the team that their Christmas present was home-field advantage. In addition, Patrick Mahomes and Travis Kelce were both given custom red Santa-themed puffer jackets, which they took home with them later that evening.

==== Week 18: at Denver Broncos ====
Week 18: Kansas City Chiefs at Denver Broncos – Game summary

Quarter	1	2	3	4	Total
Chiefs	0	0	0	0	**0**
**Broncos**	14	10	7	7	**38**

at Empower Field at Mile High, Denver, Colorado

- Date: January 5
- Game time: 3:25 p.m. CST/2:25 p.m. MST
- Game weather: Sunny and clear, 30 °F (−1 °C)
- Game attendance: 76,489
- Referee: Shawn Hochuli
- TV announcers (CBS): Jim Nantz, Tony Romo and Tracy Wolfson
- Recap, Game Book

Game information

**First quarter**

- DEN – Marvin Mims 32-yard pass from Bo Nix (Wil Lutz kick), 11:55. Broncos 7–0. **Drive: 6 plays, 70 yards, 3:05.**
- DEN – Courtland Sutton 10-yard pass from Bo Nix (Wil Lutz kick), 4:53. Broncos 14–0. **Drive: 10 plays, 85 yards, 5:35.**

**Second quarter**

- DEN – Devaughn Vele 3-yard pass from Bo Nix (Wil Lutz kick), 6:46. Broncos 21–0. **Drive: 18 plays, 89 yards, 11:05.**
- DEN – Wil Lutz 33-yard field goal, 0:03. Broncos 24–0. **Drive: 4 plays, 44 yards, 1:01.**

**Third quarter**

- DEN – Marvin Mims 7-yard pass from Bo Nix (Wil Lutz kick), 2:49. Broncos 31–0. **Drive: 11 plays, 79 yards, 6:15.**

**Fourth quarter**

- DEN – Audric Estimé 1-yard run (Wil Lutz kick), 9:40. Broncos 38–0. **Drive: 10 plays, 51 yards, 5:53.**

**Top passers**

- KC – Carson Wentz – 10/17, 98 yards
- DEN – Bo Nix – 26/29, 321 yards, 4 TD

**Top rushers**

- KC – Carson Steele – 8 rushes, 25 yards
- DEN – Bo Nix – 7 rushes, 47 yards

**Top receivers**

- KC – Nikko Remigio – 2 receptions, 48 yards
- DEN – Courtland Sutton – 5 receptions, 98 yards, TD

On January 4, prior to the game, the Chiefs were delayed from departing Kansas City International Airport due to an airport closure by NOTAM, as a result of Winter Storm Blair producing freezing drizzle on the airfield. This delayed their flight to compete against the Broncos on January 5 at Denver. The Chiefs had an extremely disappointing game against the Bo Nix-led Denver Broncos, as they were shut out 38–0. With the giant loss, the Chiefs ended their season 15–2 and failed to become the first NFL team to win 16 games since the 2007 Patriots. Their –36 point differential (outscored 52–16) against the Broncos in their two meetings was their worst since they got outscored 55–12 (for a point differential of –43) in their two meetings, both losses, in 2012.

As the Chiefs had already clinched the number one seed, they rested the vast majority of their starters for the entire game. This was the Chiefs' first shutout loss since 2012, when they were defeated by the Oakland Raiders 15–0 in Week 15.

=== Standings ===
==== Division ====
AFC West
	W	L	T	PCT	DIV	CONF	PF	PA	STK
^{(1)} Kansas City Chiefs	15	2	0	.882	5–1	10–2	385	326	L1
^{(5)} Los Angeles Chargers	11	6	0	.647	4–2	8–4	402	301	W3
^{(7)} Denver Broncos	10	7	0	.588	3–3	6–6	425	311	W1
Las Vegas Raiders	4	13	0	.235	0–6	3–9	309	434	L1

==== Conference ====
AFC
Seed	Team	Division	W	L	T	PCT	DIV	CONF	SOS	SOV	STK
**Division leaders**
1	Kansas City Chiefs	West	15	2	0	.882	5–1	10–2	.488	.463	L1
2	Buffalo Bills	East	13	4	0	.765	5–1	9–3	.467	.448	L1
3	Baltimore Ravens	North	12	5	0	.706	4–2	8–4	.529	.525	W4
4	Houston Texans	South	10	7	0	.588	5–1	8–4	.481	.376	W1
**Wild cards**
5	Los Angeles Chargers	West	11	6	0	.647	4–2	8–4	.467	.348	W3
6 (Note: Pittsburgh clinched the #6 seed over Denver based on head-to-head victory.)	Pittsburgh Steelers	North	10	7	0	.588	3–3	7–5	.502	.453	L4
7	Denver Broncos	West	10	7	0	.588	3–3	6–6	.502	.394	W1
**Did not qualify for the postseason**
8	Cincinnati Bengals	North	9	8	0	.529	3–3	6–6	.478	.314	W5
9 (Note: Indianapolis finished ahead of Miami based on head-to-head victory.)	Indianapolis Colts	South	8	9	0	.471	3–3	7–5	.457	.309	W1
10	Miami Dolphins	East	8	9	0	.471	3–3	6–6	.419	.294	L1
11	New York Jets	East	5	12	0	.294	2–4	5–7	.495	.341	W1
12 (Note: Jacksonville finished ahead of New England and Las Vegas based on conference record. (Jacksonville 4–8 to New England 3–9 to Las Vegas 3–9))	Jacksonville Jaguars	South	4	13	0	.235	3–3	4–8	.478	.265	L1
13 (Note: New England finished ahead of Las Vegas based on strength of victory. (New England .471 to Las Vegas .353))	New England Patriots	East	4	13	0	.235	2–4	3–9	.471	.471	W1
14	Las Vegas Raiders	West	4	13	0	.235	0–6	3–9	.540	.353	L1
15 (Note: Cleveland finished ahead of Tennessee based on strength of victory. (Cleveland .510 to Tennessee .431))	Cleveland Browns	North	3	14	0	.176	2–4	3–9	.536	.510	L6
16	Tennessee Titans	South	3	14	0	.176	1–5	3–9	.522	.431	L6
**Tiebreakers** (Note: When breaking ties for three or more teams under the NFL's rules, they are first broken within divisions, then comparing only the highest ranked remaining team from each division.)

== Postseason ==
=== Schedule ===
Round	Date	Opponent (seed)	Result	Record	Venue	Sources
Wild Card	First-round bye					
Divisional	January 18	Houston Texans (4)	W 23–14	1–0	Arrowhead Stadium	Recap
AFC Championship	January 26	Buffalo Bills (2)	W 32–29	2–0	Arrowhead Stadium	Recap
Super Bowl LIX	February 9	vs. Philadelphia Eagles (N2)	L 22–40	2–1	Caesars Superdome	Recap

=== Game summaries ===
==== AFC Divisional Playoffs: vs. (4) Houston Texans ====
AFC Divisional Playoffs: (4) Houston Texans at (1) Kansas City Chiefs;– Game summary

Quarter	1	2	3	4	Total
Texans	3	3	6	2	14
Chiefs	6	7	0	10	23

at Arrowhead Stadium, Kansas City, Missouri

- Date: January 18, 2025
- Game time: 3:30 p.m. CST
- Game weather: 23 °F (−5 °C)
- Game attendance: 73,458
- Referee: Clay Martin
- TV announcers (ESPN/ABC/ESPN+): Joe Buck, Troy Aikman, Lisa Salters and Laura Rutledge
- Recap, Game Book

Game information

First quarter

- KC – Harrison Butker 32-yard field goal, 13:58. Chiefs 3–0. Drive: 4 plays, −1 yard, 1:02.
- HOU – Kaʻimi Fairbairn 30-yard field goal, 8:41. Tied 3–3. Drive: 10 plays, 68 yards, 5:17.
- KC – Harrison Butker 36-yard field goal, 3:59. Chiefs 6–3. Drive: 9 plays, 51 yards, 4:42.

Second quarter

- KC – Kareem Hunt 3-yard run (Harrison Butker kick), 4:36. Chiefs 13–3. Drive: 5 plays, 55 yards, 2:25.
- HOU – Kaʻimi Fairbairn 48-yard field goal, 0:16. Chiefs 13–6. Drive: 9 plays, 41 yards, 4:20.

Third quarter

- HOU – Joe Mixon 13-yard run (kick failed, wide right), 4:36. Chiefs 13–12. Drive: 15 plays, 82 yards, 10:24.

Fourth quarter

- KC – Travis Kelce 11-yard pass from Patrick Mahomes (Harrison Butker kick), 11:52. Chiefs 20–12. Drive: 13 plays, 81 yards, 7:44.
- KC – Harrison Butker 27-yard field goal, 4:38. Chiefs 23–12. Drive: 7 plays, 36 yards, 2:57.
- HOU – Matt Araiza OB in end zone, forced by Jared Wayne for a Safety, 0:09. Chiefs 23–14.

Top passers

- HOU – C. J. Stroud – 19/28, 245 yards
- KC – Patrick Mahomes – 16/25, 177 yards, TD

Top rushers

- HOU – Joe Mixon – 18 rushes, 88 yards, TD
- KC – Kareem Hunt – 8 rushes, 44 yards, TD

Top receivers

- HOU – Nico Collins – 5 receptions, 81 yards
- KC – Travis Kelce – 7 receptions, 117 yards, TD

With the win, Andy Reid became the fourth head coach in NFL history to win 300 games. The Chiefs would go on to the AFC Championship Game and win against the Bills 32–29. This was the third overall playoff meeting between the Chiefs and Texans. The Chiefs won the first two playoff meetings, most recently the 2019 AFC Divisional Game, which the Chiefs won 51–31 in Kansas City en route to winning Super Bowl LIV despite trailing 24–0 during the second quarter. In the regular season, the Chiefs defeated the Texans 27–19 in Kansas City during Week 16.

The Chiefs, playing in their first meaningful game since Christmas Day, 24 days prior, received an immediate boost when kicker returner Nikko Remigio returned the opening kickoff for 63 yards. A Texans unsportsmanlike conduct penalty on the play took the ball to Houston's 13-yard line. The Chiefs went three-and-out and kicked a field goal to take the early lead. The Texans responded with a Kaʻimi Fairbairn field goal after a 10-play drive, tying the game. Harrison Butker kicked the Chiefs into the lead on the next possession with a 36-yard field goal. A few possessions later, Fairbairn missed a 55-yard kick wide to the right, giving the Chiefs a short field. The Chiefs scored on this possession: a Kareem Hunt short touchdown run at the goal line, which was highlighted by a Patrick Mahomes pass and run to Travis Kelce for 49 yards, the longest playoff reception in Kelce's career. Fairbairn snuck in a 48-yard field goal on the next possession just before halftime, to pull the Texans within seven points.

The Texans opened the third quarter with the ball and scored on a Joe Mixon 13-yard run to cap a 10-minute drive; however, Fairbairn missed the extra point, leaving Houston one point behind, 13–12. The Chiefs responded with a seven-minute and 44-second drive, with a Mahomes to Kelce touchdown catch as Mahomes was falling to the ground. It was the duo's 18th touchdown connection, extending their playoff record for a quarterback and pass catcher. In the fourth quarter, with 10:05 left in the game, the Texans failed on a fourth down on the Kansas City 40-yard line. On the play, C. J. Stroud was sacked by regular-season team sack leader George Karlaftis for 16 yards, the fourth sack of the game for Kansas City's defense. The teams exchanged three-and-outs before Harrison Butker extended the Chiefs ' lead to 23–12 with a field goal late in the fourth quarter. Stroud led the Texans to the red zone on the next possession, but an eighth sack against him forced him out of the game with an injury. On the next play, Fairbairn missed his third kick of the game, via a block by Leo Chenal. Chiefs punter Matt Araiza took a safety rather than punting the ball back to the Texans to end the game.

The Chiefs' 23–14 win gave them 16 playoff wins in the Mahomes–Reid era. In addition, Andy Reid joined the 300-win club with the victory. Kansas City will host the AFC Championship Game next Sunday, in what will be their seventh straight AFC Championship game, one short of the record set by the 2011–2018 Patriots.

The Chiefs became the first team in NFL postseason history to win while forcing no turnovers and being outgained by at least 100 yards. Previously, teams were 0–49.

==== AFC Championship: vs. (2) Buffalo Bills ====
AFC Championship: (2) Buffalo Bills at (1) Kansas City Chiefs – Game summary

Quarter	1	2	3	4	Total
Bills	3	13	6	7	29
Chiefs	7	14	0	11	32

at Arrowhead Stadium, Kansas City, Missouri

- Date: January 26, 2025
- Game time: 5:30 pm CST
- Game weather: 31 °F (−1 °C)
- Game attendance: 73,487
- Referee: Clete Blakeman
- TV announcers (CBS): Jim Nantz, Tony Romo, Tracy Wolfson, Evan Washburn and Jay Feely
- Recap, Game Book

Game information

First quarter

- KC – Kareem Hunt 12-yard run (Harrison Butker kick), 8:56. Chiefs 7–0. Drive: 9 plays, 90 yards, 5:05.
- BUF – Tyler Bass 53-yard field goal, 3:45. Chiefs 7–3. Drive: 10 plays, 35 yards, 5:11.

Second quarter

- BUF – James Cook 6-yard run (Tyler Bass kick), 10:25. Bills 10–7. Drive: 10 plays, 72 yards, 5:32.
- KC – Xavier Worthy 11-yard pass from Patrick Mahomes (Harrison Butker kick), 4:13. Chiefs 14–10. Drive: 11 plays, 70 yards, 6:12.
- KC – Patrick Mahomes 1-yard run (Harrison Butker kick), 1:55. Chiefs 21–10. Drive: 6 plays, 34 yards, 1:44.
- BUF – Mack Hollins 34-yard pass from Josh Allen (run failed), 0:23. Chiefs 21–16. Drive: 7 plays, 73 yards, 1:32.

Third quarter

- BUF – James Cook 1-yard run (pass failed), 2:56. Bills 22–21. Drive: 12 plays, 80 yards, 7:05.

Fourth quarter

- KC – Patrick Mahomes 10-yard run (Patrick Mahomes–Justin Watson pass), 10:14. Chiefs 29–22. Drive: 5 plays, 59 yards, 2:41.
- BUF – Curtis Samuel 4-yard pass from Josh Allen (Tyler Bass kick), 6:15. Tied 29–29. Drive: 9 plays, 70 yards, 3:59.
- KC – Harrison Butker 35-yard field goal, 3:33. Chiefs 32–29. Drive: 8 plays, 51 yards, 2:42.

Top passers

- BUF – Josh Allen – 22/34, 237 yards, 2 TD
- KC – Patrick Mahomes – 18/26, 245 yards, TD

Top rushers

- BUF – James Cook – 13 rushes, 85 yards, 2 TD
- KC – Kareem Hunt – 17 rushes, 64 yards, TD

Top receivers

- BUF – Mack Hollins – 3 receptions, 73 yards, TD
- KC – Xavier Worthy – 6 receptions, 85 yards, TD

This game marked the second meeting in the AFC Championship Game between the Chiefs and Bills since the 2020 season. The Chiefs went to Super Bowl LIX but lost to the Philadelphia Eagles 40–22. This was the seventh playoff meeting between the Bills and Chiefs, and the fourth in five seasons. The Chiefs lead the historical playoff series 4–2, including the 2021 AFC Divisional Game, where the Chiefs offense orchestrated a game-tying drive in the final 13 seconds of regulation. The most recent playoff meeting came in the 2023 AFC Divisional Game, which the Chiefs won 27–24 in Buffalo en route to winning Super Bowl LVIII after Bills kicker Tyler Bass missed a potential game-tying field goal wide right in the final two minutes of regulation. The last conference championship meeting was the 2020 AFC Championship game, which the Chiefs won 38–24. In the regular season, the Bills defeated the Chiefs 30–21 in Buffalo during Week 11.

This was the seventh straight AFC Championship Game appearance (and eighth overall) for the Chiefs. The eighth team to win back-to-back Super Bowls, they became the fourth team to reach the Super Bowl in three consecutive seasons, after the 1971–1973 Miami Dolphins, 1991–1993 Buffalo Bills, and 2016–2018 New England Patriots; however, Kansas City is the first team to win two straight Super Bowls and then return for a third consecutive year, as the Dolphins lost their first, the Patriots their second, and the Bills all three. This is the seventh overall AFC Championship Game appearance for the Bills, who have not won a conference championship since their four consecutive AFC Championship Game victories from 1991 to 1994, one of which (1993) was against the Chiefs; that game is also the last time they beat the Chiefs in the playoffs.

The Chiefs started the scoring via a Kareem Hunt 12-yard run on their first possession. On the next possession, Bills' kicker Tyler Bass connected on a 55-yard field goal, the longest postseason kick in the history of Arrowhead Stadium. With 57 seconds left in the first quarter, Patrick Mahomes fumbled on Buffalo's 23-yard line; it was Kansas City's first offensive turnover since Week 11, which coincidentally came against Buffalo. The Bills took the momentum and scored on their next possession in the second quarter via a James Cook 6-yard run, his 20th total touchdown (regular season and playoffs) of the season. The Chiefs responded with an eleven-play drive on a Mahomes touchdown pass to rookie Xavier Worthy, taking the lead, 14–10. The Bills went three-and-out, and a Nikko Remigio 41-yard punt return set up the Chiefs on the Bills' 29-yard line. Then, Xavier Worthy caught a questionable jump ball catch on 3rd-and-5, taking the ball to Buffalo's 3-yard line. With 1:55 left in the half, Mahomes ran it in on a rollout to the right from Buffalo's 1-yard line to go up 21–10. On the Bills' next possession, a Mack Hollins 34-yard pass from Josh Allen cut the lead to one score. The Bills tried to cut the lead to three points by attempting a two-point conversion, but receiver Curtis Samuel was stopped short of the goal line. The game went into halftime with Kansas City holding a 21–16 lead.

Kansas City's first drive out of halftime stalled on a Matt Milano sack of Mahomes on 3rd-and-11 on Buffalo's 37-yard line. Buffalo proceeded to take the ball down the field and scored on a James Cook 1-yard run on 4th-and-goal, taking the lead, 22–21. Bass made his extra point attempt, but Chiefs safety Justin Reid was called for offside, having come over the line of scrimmage before the ball was snapped in an attempt to block the kick. The Bills had the choice of declining the penalty, which would've resulted in a successful extra point, or accepting the penalty, which would allow them to attempt another two-point conversion, but from the one-yard line instead of the two-yard line due to the penalty. The Bills accepted the penalty, and their second two-point conversion attempt of the game, a QB sneak by Allen, was unsuccessful. On the ensuing possession, the Bills' defense held the Chiefs to a punt, allowing Buffalo to possibly go up by two possessions. However, the drive ended with no score after the final two plays, and in particular Josh Allen's fourth-and-inches quarterback sneak, were controversially ruled short of the line to gain, turning the ball over to the Chiefs on Kansas City's 41-yard line with 13:01 left to play.

The Chiefs responded to it with a five-play, 59-yard touchdown drive capped off by a 10-yard Mahomes run, his second rushing touchdown of the game and third overall in the postseason; on the two-point conversion, Mahomes found Justin Watson at the back of the endzone to take the lead 29–22. The Bills then marched down the field on a nine-play, 70-yard touchdown drive, culminating in a four-yard touchdown pass from Allen to Samuel on 4th-and-goal, and after Bass made the extra point, the score was tied at 29 with 6:15 left in the game. The Chiefs' next drive stalled on Buffalo's 17-yard line, with the Bills holding them to a Harrison Butker field goal, giving the Chiefs a 32–29 lead with 3:33 left to play. The Bills got the ball back and needed to either kick a field goal to tie the game or score a touchdown to take the lead to avoid a fourth consecutive playoff loss to the Chiefs. However, the Bills were only able to get one first down, a Josh Allen 13-yard scramble on 2nd-and-11 from the Buffalo 29-yard line. After the scramble, first and second down resulted in incompletions before Allen connected with Amari Cooper for five yards on 3rd-and-10, setting up a do-or-die 4th-and-5 for the Bills. On the play, Kansas City defensive coordinator Steve Spagnuolo chose to heavily blitz Allen, causing him to heave the ball to Dalton Kincaid. The ball was catchable, but Kincaid misread the pass and dropped it while sliding. Buffalo then used a timeout after each play the Chiefs ran to get the ball back, but Kansas City was able to get a first down and kneel out the clock to secure their berth in Super Bowl LIX.

In the game, star quarterbacks Josh Allen and Patrick Mahomes recorded similar statistics: Allen went 22–34 with 237 yards passing and two passing touchdowns, while Mahomes went 18–26 for 245 yards and one touchdown. On the ground, Allen went for 39 yards on 11 carries, while Mahomes had 43 yards on 11 carries with two scrambling touchdowns. In nine composite matchups between the Chiefs and Bills (regular season and playoffs), Mahomes's team now has outscored Allen's 245–240. In addition, with the AFC Championship Game win, Mahomes now has 17 postseason wins, breaking a tie with Joe Montana for the second-most wins by a quarterback in playoff history and trailing only Tom Brady and his 35 wins.

The broadcast on CBS drew an AFC Championship Game record viewing audience of 57.4 million viewers.

==== Super Bowl LIX: vs. (N2) Philadelphia Eagles ====
Super Bowl LIX: (A1) Kansas City Chiefs vs. (N2) Philadelphia Eagles – Game summary

Quarter	1	2	3	4	Total
Chiefs	0	0	6	16	22
Eagles	7	17	10	6	40

at Caesars Superdome, New Orleans, Louisiana

- Date: February 9, 2025
- Game time: 5:40 p.m. CST
- Game weather: None (indoor stadium)
- Game attendance: 65,719
- Referee: Ronald Torbert
- TV announcers (Fox): Kevin Burkhardt, Tom Brady, Erin Andrews and Tom Rinaldi
- Recap, Game Book

Game information

First quarter

- PHI – Jalen Hurts 1-yard run (Jake Elliott kick), 6:15. Eagles 7–0. Drive: 7 plays, 69 yards, 3:25.

Second quarter

- PHI – Jake Elliott 48-yard field goal, 8:38. Eagles 10–0. Drive: 7 plays, 27 yards, 3:59.
- PHI – Cooper DeJean 38-yard interception return (Jake Elliott kick), 7:03. Eagles 17–0.
- PHI – A. J. Brown 12-yard pass from Jalen Hurts (Jake Elliott kick), 1:35. Eagles 24–0. Drive: 2 plays, 14 yards, 0:10.

Third quarter

- PHI – Jake Elliott 29-yard field goal, 5:18. Eagles 27–0. Drive: 12 plays, 69 yards, 6:42.
- PHI – DeVonta Smith 46-yard pass from Jalen Hurts (Jake Elliott kick), 2:40. Eagles 34–0. Drive: 1 play, 46 yards, 0:07.
- KC – Xavier Worthy 24-yard pass from Patrick Mahomes (pass failed), 0:34. Eagles 34–6. Drive: 5 plays, 90 yards, 2:06.

Fourth quarter

- PHI – Jake Elliott 48-yard field goal, 9:51. Eagles 37–6. Drive: 10 plays, 40 yards, 5:43.
- PHI – Jake Elliott 50-yard field goal, 8:01. Eagles 40–6. Drive: 4 plays, 1 yard, 1:41.
- KC – DeAndre Hopkins 7-yard pass from Patrick Mahomes (Patrick Mahomes–Justin Watson pass), 2:54. Eagles 40–14. Drive: 12 plays, 75 yards, 5:07.
- KC – Xavier Worthy 50-yard pass from Patrick Mahomes (Patrick Mahomes–DeAndre Hopkins pass), 1:48. Eagles 40–22. Drive: 1 play, 50 yards, 0:08.

Top passers

- KC – Patrick Mahomes – 21/32, 257 yards, 3 TD, 2 INT
- PHI – Jalen Hurts – 17/22, 221 yards, 2 TD, INT

Top rushers

- KC – Patrick Mahomes – 4 rushes, 25 yards
- PHI – Jalen Hurts – 11 rushes, 72 yards, TD

Top receivers

- KC – Xavier Worthy – 8 receptions, 157 yards, 2 TD
- PHI – DeVonta Smith – 4 receptions, 69 yards, TD

A rematch of Super Bowl LVII, Super Bowl LIX was the second Super Bowl meeting between the Chiefs and Eagles since the 2022 season. After the Chiefs won the coin toss and deferred possession to the second half, the Eagles received the opening kickoff, which was a touchback. The Eagles' initial drive of six plays gained 20 yards to midfield; however, an offensive pass interference call on A.J. Brown negated a 32-yard pass on fourth down, forcing them to punt. After a 53-yard punt by Braden Mann, the Chiefs' drive began on their own 12 following a 5-yard return by Nikko Remigio.

Quarterback Patrick Mahomes completed his first pass 11 yards to JuJu Smith-Schuster for a first down. After a 1-yard pass and two incomplete throws, Matt Araiza punted 58 yards from the Chiefs' 24. The punt was returned 13 yards by Cooper DeJean, setting the Eagles up at their 31 to begin their second drive. Subsequently, the Eagles put together a 7-play, 69-yard touchdown drive that included a 20-yard pass to Dallas Goedert. Although Jahan Dotson caught a pass that was initially signaled d a touchdown, he was ruled short of the goal line; regardless, Jalen Hurts scored with a quarterback sneak using the team's signature Tush Push play for a 1-yard touchdown.

After another punt by the Chiefs, the Eagles got to the Chiefs' 30-yard line on an 11-play drive that ended with an interception thrown by Hurts to Bryan Cook at the Chiefs' 2-yard line at the start of the second quarter. Despite this, the Chiefs went three-and-out again, and after a Jake Elliott 48-yard field goal, Mahomes threw an interception to DeJean, who returned it 38 yards for a touchdown. Both teams then traded punts before Mahomes threw another interception to Zack Baun shortly after the two-minute warning, which set up a 12-yard touchdown pass from Hurts to Brown, extending the Eagles' lead to 24–0 before halftime.

The second half began with an Eagles kickoff, which resulted in a touchback. Despite gaining a first down with a pass to Xavier Worthy, Mahomes was sacked twice in the next two plays, and the Chiefs' drive stalled at their own 37-yard line. The Eagles responded by driving down the field 69 yards, including a 16-yard and 14-yard run by Hurts, which ended with a 29-yard field goal from Jake Elliott.

The Chiefs' next drive took them five plays and 17 yards to their 47-yard line. Facing a fourth down, a pass from Mahomes to DeAndre Hopkins fell incomplete after it was batted away by Avonte Maddox, resulting in a turnover on downs. On the next play, Hurts threw a 46-yard touchdown pass to DeVonta Smith, increasing the Eagles' score to 34. The Chiefs responded with a 24-yard touchdown pass from Mahomes to Worthy at the end of the third quarter, their first score of the game, but failed a two-point conversion attempt from Mahomes to tight end Travis Kelce.

In the fourth quarter, after a 48-yard field goal from Elliott, Mahomes fumbled the ball on a strip sack by Milton Williams, which was recovered by Williams himself at the Chiefs' 18-yard line. Although an unsportsmanlike conduct penalty was called on Williams, Elliott converted a 50-yard field goal attempt, making the score 40–6. On the next drive, Mahomes threw a 7-yard pass to DeAndre Hopkins for a touchdown; the corresponding 2-point conversion from Mahomes to Justin Watson was successful. The Eagles proceeded to bench their starters and allowed their backups to play and take snaps in the final minutes of the game, and after the Eagles turned the ball over on downs, Mahomes responded with a 50-yard touchdown pass to Worthy and another successful 2-point conversion with a pass to Hopkins, cutting the Chiefs' deficit to 18 points for a 40–22 score. A subsequent onside kick was recovered by the Eagles, who ran out the clock.
