= Jaden Hicks =

American football player (born 2002)

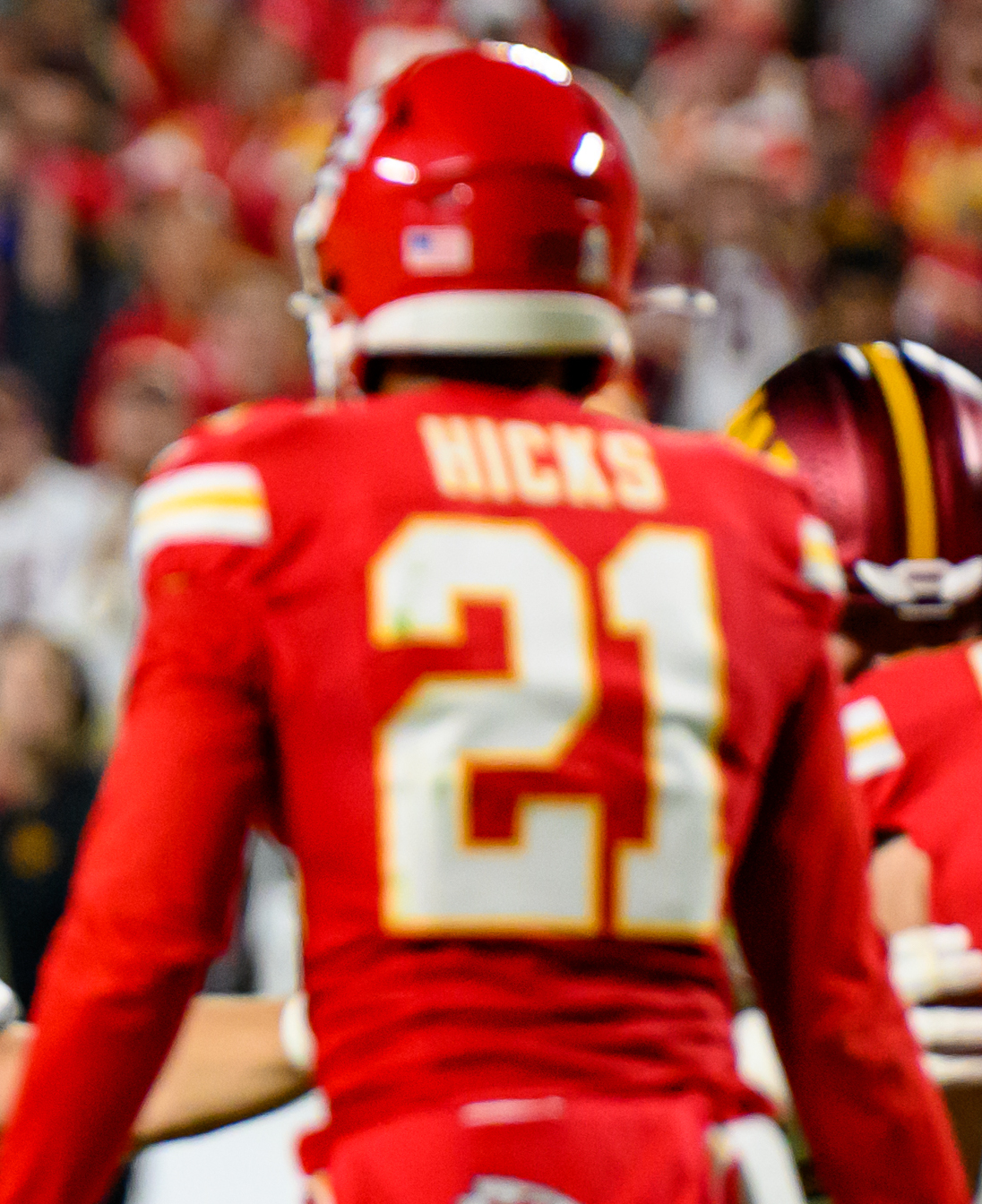
- Hicks in 2025

No. 21 – Kansas City Chiefs
- Position: Safety
- Roster status: Active

Personal information
- Born: August 16, 2002 (age 24); Las Vegas, Nevada, U.S.
- Listed height: 6 ft 1 in (1.85 m)
- Listed weight: 215 lb (98 kg)

Career information
- High school: Bishop Gorman (Las Vegas)
- College: Washington State (2021–2023)
- NFL draft: 2024: 4th round, 133rd overall pick

Career history
- Kansas City Chiefs (2024–present)

Career NFL statistics as of 2025
- Total tackles: 71
- Sacks: 0.5
- Pass deflections: 9
- Interceptions: 3
- Stats at Pro Football Reference

Jaden Hicks (born August 16, 2002) is an American professional football safety for the Kansas City Chiefs of the National Football League (NFL). He played college football for the Washington State Cougars.

== Early life ==
Hicks attended Bishop Gorman High School in Las Vegas, Nevada. As a junior, he had seven interceptions and returned three for a touchdown. His senior season was canceled because of the COVID-19 pandemic. He committed to Washington State University to play college football.

== College career ==
Hicks played in one game his first season at Washington State in 2021 and took a redshirt. As a redshirt freshman in 2022, he started 11 of 13 games and had 76 tackles, one interception and one sack. He returned to Washington State as a starter in 2023.

== Professional career ==
Pre-draft measurables
Height	Weight	Arm length	Hand span	Wingspan	40-yard dash	10-yard split	20-yard split	20-yard shuttle	Three-cone drill	Vertical jump	Broad jump	Bench press
6 ft 1 7/8 in (1.88 m)	211 lb (96 kg)	31 1/2 in (0.80 m)	9 3/8 in (0.24 m)	6 ft 4 1/4 in (1.94 m)	4.49 s	1.58 s	2.65 s	4.37 s	6.88 s	37.5 in (0.95 m)	10 ft 2 in (3.10 m)	16 reps
All values from NFL Combine/Pro Day

Hicks was selected by the Kansas City Chiefs with the 133rd overall pick in the fourth round of the 2024 NFL draft.

As a rookie, he led the Chiefs in interceptions made with 3.

== NFL career statistics ==
Legend
**Bold**	Career high

=== Regular season ===
Year	Team	Games		Tackles					Interceptions						Fumbles				
Year	Team	GP	GS	Cmb	Solo	Ast	Sck	TFL	Int	Yds	Avg	Lng	TD	PD	FF	Fmb	FR	Yds	TD
2024	KC	17	1	29	23	6	0.0	**3**	**3**	**50**	**16.7**	**47**	0	**5**	0	0	0	0	0
2025	KC	17	3	**42**	**29**	**13**	**0.5**	0	0	0	0.0	0	0	4	0	0	0	0	0
Career		34	4	71	52	19	0.5	3	3	50	16.7	47	0	9	0	0	0	0	0

=== Postseason ===
Year	Team	Games		Tackles					Interceptions						Fumbles				
Year	Team	GP	GS	Cmb	Solo	Ast	Sck	TFL	Int	Yds	Avg	Lng	TD	PD	FF	Fmb	FR	Yds	TD
2024	KC	3	0	13	10	3	0.0	0	0	0	0.0	0	0	0	0	0	0	0	0
Career		3	0	13	10	3	0.0	0	0	0	0.0	0	0	0	0	0	0	0	0
