= Xavier Worthy =

American football player (born 2003)

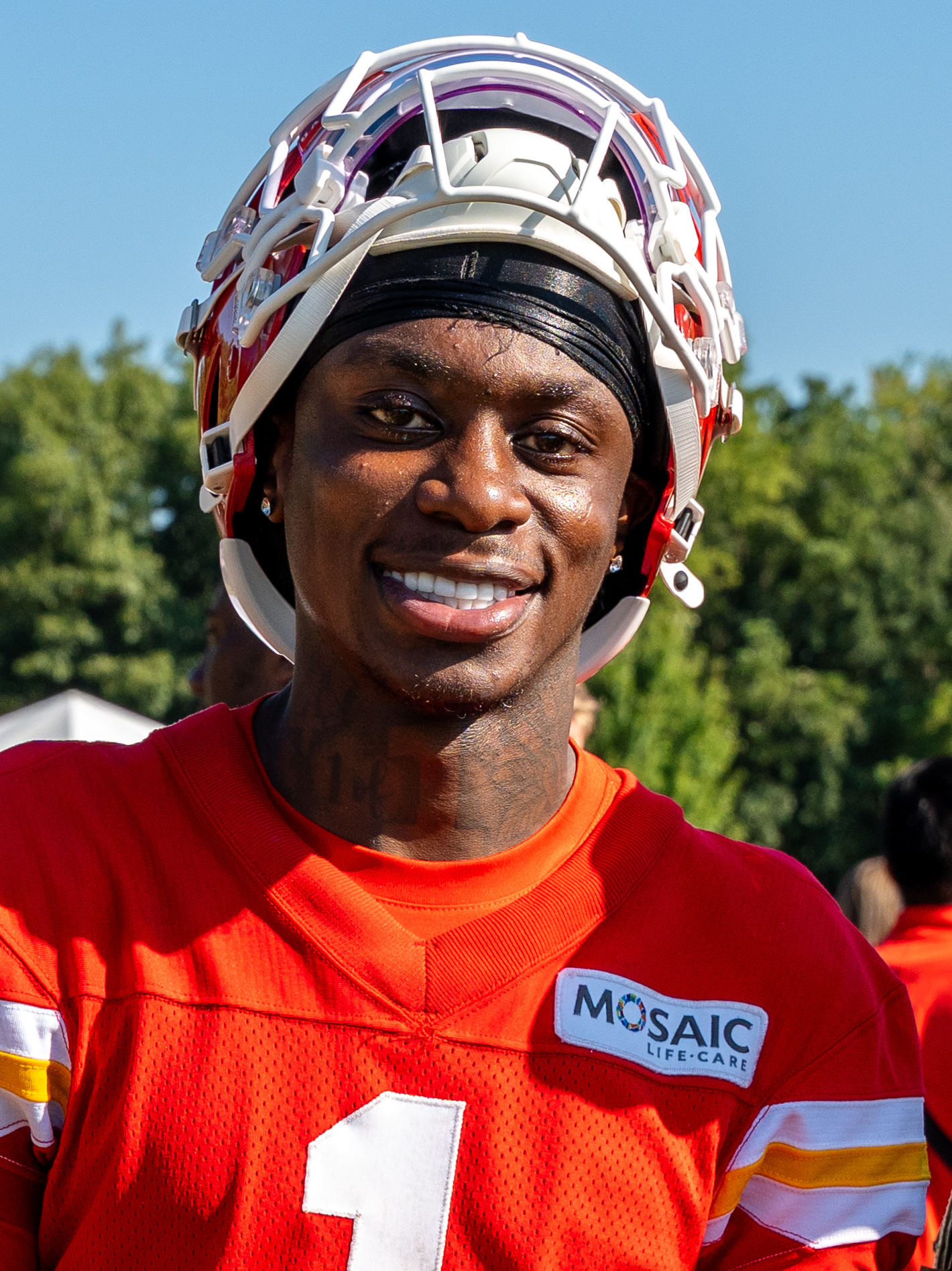
- Worthy with the Kansas City Chiefs in 2025

No. 1 – Kansas City Chiefs
- Position: Wide receiver
- Roster status: Active

Personal information
- Born: April 27, 2003 (age 23); Fresno, California, U.S.
- Listed height: 5 ft 11 in (1.80 m)
- Listed weight: 165 lb (75 kg)

Career information
- High school: Central East (Fresno)
- College: Texas (2021–2023)
- NFL draft: 2024: 1st round, 28th overall pick

Career history
- Kansas City Chiefs (2024–present)

Awards and highlights
- NCAA punt return yards leader (2023); 2× First-team All-Big 12 (2021, 2023); Second-team All-Big 12 (2022); Big 12 Offensive Freshman of the Year (2021); Freshman All-American (2021)

Career NFL statistics as of Week 4, 2026
- Receptions: 115
- Receiving yards: 1,303
- Receiving touchdowns: 8
- Rushing yards: 191
- Rushing touchdowns: 3
- Stats at Pro Football Reference

Xavier Worthy (born April 27, 2003) is an American professional football wide receiver for the Kansas City Chiefs of the National Football League (NFL). He played college football for the Texas Longhorns, earning three All-Big 12 honors. Worthy holds the 40-yard dash record at the NFL Combine (4.21 seconds) and was selected by the Chiefs in the first round of the 2024 NFL draft.

== Early life ==
Worthy attended Central East High School in Fresno, California. He was selected to play in the 2021 All-American Bowl, but the game was not played due to the COVID-19 pandemic. He originally committed to the University of Michigan to play college football but changed to the University of Texas at Austin.

== College career ==
=== 2021 season ===
Worthy earned immediate playing time his freshman season at Texas in 2021. Worthy had a breakout freshman year at Texas, breaking several freshman school records. These records include receiving yards in a season, with 981 yards, and receiving touchdowns in a season, with 12. These records were previously held by Roy Williams, who had 809 yards with 8 touchdowns in his 2000 freshman season. Worthy also broke the school freshman record of receiving yards in a game with 261 yards against rival Oklahoma. At the conclusion of Worthy's freshman season, he was awarded true-freshman All-American by Pro Football Focus, 247 Sports, and FWAA.

=== 2022 season ===
As a sophomore, Worthy played and started in all 13 games as the starting wide receiver and primary punt returner. He logged 60 receptions for 760 yards and nine touchdowns, and returned 15 punts for 146 yards. Worthy caught a pass in every single game to start his career, making his 25-game streak the eighth-longest streak in Texas history. At the end of the season, Worthy was named to the All-Big 12 second team.

=== 2023 season ===
As a junior, Worthy played and started in all 14 games. He logged 75 receptions for 1,014 yards and 5 touchdowns, and returned 22 punts for an NCAA-leading 371 yards and one touchdown. At the end of the season, Worthy was named to the All-Big 12 first team at wide receiver and return specialist and All-American second team as a punt returner.

On January 2, 2024, Worthy announced that he would forgo his senior year and enter the 2024 NFL draft.

== Professional career ==
Pre-draft measurables
| Height | Weight | Arm length | Hand span | Wingspan | 40-yard dash | 10-yard split | 20-yard split | Vertical jump | Broad jump |
|---|---|---|---|---|---|---|---|---|---|
| 5 ft 11 1/4 in (1.81 m) | 165 lb (75 kg) | 31 1/8 in (0.79 m) | 8 3/4 in (0.22 m) | 6 ft 2 1/4 in (1.89 m) | 4.21 s | 1.49 s | 2.42 s | 41.0 in (1.04 m) | 10 ft 11 in (3.33 m) |
All values from NFL Combine

Worthy set the 40-yard dash record of 4.21 at the 2024 NFL Combine, breaking the previous record of 4.22 by John Ross.

=== 2024 season ===
Worthy was selected by the Kansas City Chiefs in the first round with the 28th overall pick in the 2024 NFL draft, which was traded to them by the Buffalo Bills. Worthy signed his four-year rookie contract worth $13.79 million fully guaranteed. On September 5, 2024, on his first touch of the ball in the NFL, Worthy scored his first touchdown in a home game versus the Baltimore Ravens, running it in from 21 yards out. He caught another 35-yard touchdown in the 27–20 win. As a rookie, he finished with 59 receptions for 638 yards and 6 touchdowns in the 2024 season.

In Super Bowl LIX, Worthy had 8 receptions for 157 yards and 2 touchdowns in the 40-22 loss, becoming the first Texas Longhorn to score a touchdown in the Super Bowl. His 157 yards set a new Super Bowl record for most receiving yards by a rookie receiver, breaking the previous mark of 109 yards by Torry Holt and Chris Matthews.

=== 2025 season ===
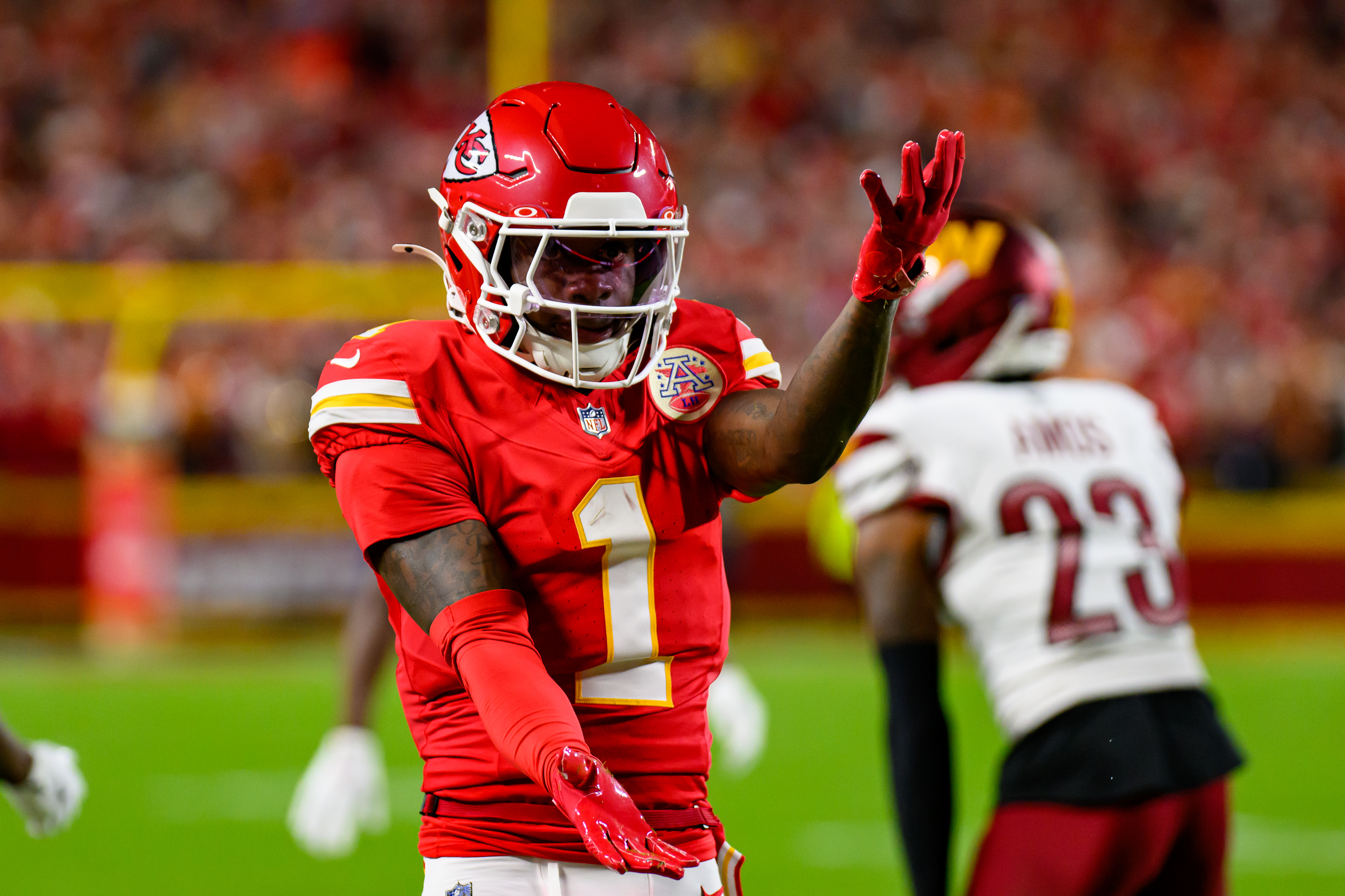
Worthy playing in 2025

In Week 1 against the Los Angeles Chargers in São Paulo, Worthy collided with teammate Travis Kelce in the first quarter. In that play, Worthy suffered a dislocated shoulder and was ruled out for the game. The Chiefs later lost, 27–21. Due to his injury, Worthy did not play in Week 2 or Week 3. In Week 6 against the Detroit Lions, he scored his first touchdown of the season.

== Career statistics ==
=== NFL ===
Legend
| | Led the league |
| **Bold** | Career High |

==== Regular season ====
| Year | Team | Games | | Receiving | | | | | Rushing | | | | | Fumbles | |
| Year | Team | GP | GS | Rec | Yds | Avg | Lng | TD | Att | Yds | Avg | Lng | TD | Fum | Lost |
|---|---|---|---|---|---|---|---|---|---|---|---|---|---|---|---|
| 2024 | KC | 17 | 13 | **59** | **638** | 10.8 | **54** | **6** | **20** | **104** | 5.2 | 21 | 3 | 0 | 0 |
| 2025 | KC | 14 | 13 | 42 | 532 | **12.7** | 42 | 1 | 11 | 87 | **7.9** | **35** | 0 | 0 | 0 |
| Career | | 31 | 26 | 101 | 1170 | 11.6 | 54 | 7 | 31 | 191 | 6.2 | 35 | 3 | 0 | 0 |

==== Postseason ====
| Year | Team | Games | | Receiving | | | | | Rushing | | | | | Fumbles | |
| Year | Team | GP | GS | Rec | Yds | Avg | Lng | TD | Att | Yds | Avg | Lng | TD | Fum | Lost |
|---|---|---|---|---|---|---|---|---|---|---|---|---|---|---|---|
| 2024 | KC | 3 | 3 | 19 | 287 | 15.1 | 50 | 3 | 3 | 8 | 2.7 | 8 | 0 | 0 | 0 |
| Career | | 3 | 3 | 19 | 287 | 15.1 | 50 | 3 | 3 | 8 | 2.7 | 8 | 0 | 0 | 0 |

=== College ===
Legend
| | Led the NCAA |
| **Bold** | Career high |

| Year | Team | Games | | Receiving | | | | Rushing | | | Punt returns | | | |
| Year | Team | GP | GS | Rec | Yds | Avg | TD | Att | Yds | TD | Ret | Yds | Avg | TD |
|---|---|---|---|---|---|---|---|---|---|---|---|---|---|---|
| 2021 | Texas | 12 | 12 | 62 | 981 | **15.8** | **12** | 1 | 7 | 0 | 3 | 47 | 15.7 | 0 |
| 2022 | Texas | 13 | 13 | 60 | 760 | 12.7 | 9 | 2 | 14 | 0 | 15 | 146 | 9.7 | 0 |
| 2023 | Texas | 14 | 14 | **75** | **1,014** | 13.5 | 5 | **4** | **35** | 0 | **22** | **371** | **16.9** | **1** |
| Career | | 39 | 39 | 197 | 2,755 | 14.0 | 26 | 7 | 56 | 0 | 40 | 564 | 14.1 | 1 |

== Personal life ==
Worthy proposed to his former girlfriend, Tia Jones on July 9, 2024. On March 7, 2025, Worthy was arrested for alleged assault of a family member, later revealed to be Jones. The next day, the charges were dropped. Worthy has since pressed charges against Jones alleging theft and assault.
