= Tom and Jerry (American football) =

Notable American football play in Super Bowl LVIII

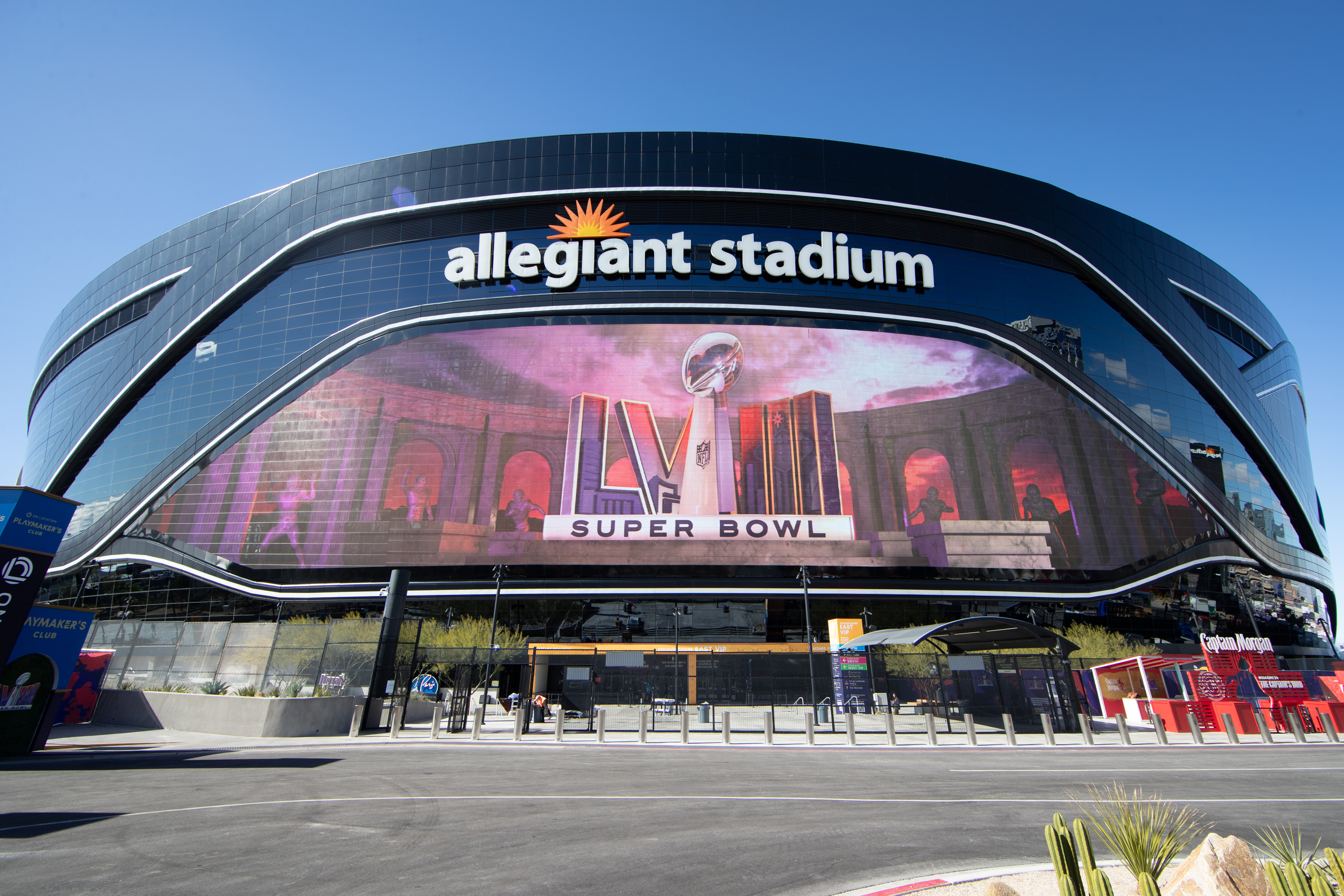
- Allegiant Stadium decorated for Super Bowl LVIII
San Francisco 49ers (1) (NFC) (12–5)	Kansas City Chiefs (3) (AFC) (11–6)
22	25
Head coach: Kyle Shanahan	Head coach: Andy Reid
	1	2	3	4	OT	Total
SF	0	10	0	9	3	22
KC	0	3	10	6	6	25
- Date: February 11, 2024
- Kickoff time: 3:40 p.m. PST (UTC−8)
- Stadium: Allegiant Stadium; Paradise, Nevada
- Favorite: 49ers by 2
- Attendance: 61,629

TV in the United States
- Network: TV: CBS; Univision (Spanish); Nickelodeon (Alternative broadcast); Streaming: Paramount+ Vix (Spanish)
- Announcers: CBS: Jim Nantz (play-by-play); Tony Romo (analyst); Tracy Wolfson and Evan Washburn (sideline reporters); Jay Feely (special teams analyst); Gene Steratore (rules analyst)

Tom and Jerry is the name of a misdirection offensive play executed by the Kansas City Chiefs during Super Bowl LVIII against the defense of the San Francisco 49ers on February 11, 2024. The play call itself, designed by Chiefs head coach Andy Reid, is an altered version of the misdirection play known as Corn Dog that had led to two separate touchdowns for the Chiefs in the previous Super Bowl. The play resulted in an overtime game-winning touchdown pass from quarterback Patrick Mahomes to wide receiver Mecole Hardman, securing the Chiefs' second consecutive Super Bowl victory and third in five seasons, leading commentators to describe the play as cementing the team's status as an NFL dynasty.

== Background ==
During Super Bowl LVII on February 12, 2023, the Chiefs famously deployed a trick play dubbed Corn Dog, which relied on a pre-snap motion to misdirect the defense, resulting in two pivotal touchdown receptions by Kadarius Toney and Skyy Moore.

Mecole Hardman, the wide receiver who would ultimately make the decisive catch on the play, had played with the Chiefs for the previous four seasons on his rookie deal after being drafted by the Chiefs in 2019, appearing in three Super Bowls with the club and winning two. Prior to the season, he had left the Chiefs in free agency and signed with the New York Jets, where he appeared in five games and only recorded one reception. On October 18, 2023, the Jets traded Hardman and a seventh-round selection in the 2025 NFL draft to the Chiefs in exchange for a sixth-round selection in 2025, reuniting Hardman with his former team.

Super Bowl LVIII was deadlocked in regulation, and the game was tied 16–16 with 5:46 remaining. The 49ers scored a field goal to establish a 19–16 lead with 1:53 remaining, but the Chiefs managed to drive from their own 25 yard line and score a game-tying field goal that forced overtime for the second time in Super Bowl history.

The 49ers won the ensuing coin toss and elected to receive the ball. They were ultimately held to a field goal, establishing a 22–19 lead and returning the ball to Kansas City, who then needed to score a field goal to extend the game or a touchdown to win it. The Chiefs began the drive at the 25, and drove the ball down the field into the red zone, including a successful scramble for a first down by Mahomes on 4th-and-1. On the penultimate play, Mahomes completed a 7-yard reception to Travis Kelce to set up 1st and Goal on the 49ers 3-yard line.

== The play ==
The play itself featured a pre-snap misdirection motion similar to Corn Dog. In this case, Mecole Hardman went in motion as though to execute a jet sweep, then sharply reversed toward the sideline. The 49ers defended the play using Man Coverage, and this misdirection caused two defenders to follow Travis Kelce and left Hardman wide open. Mahomes connected with Hardman on a short pass at the 1-yard line, and Hardman walked into the endzone untouched, sealing the Chiefs' victory.

The full play call was Tiger 12 Gun Trips Right Bunch F-Shuttle Tom and Jerry Right Yellow. Tiger 12 describes the personnel package, which deploys one running back and two tight ends, generally indicating a running play. Gun Trips Right Bunch is the formation, in which Mahomes is lined up in the shotgun with the running back aligned to his right, with two tight ends and one wide receiver to the right and one wide receiver to the left, away from the bunch. F-Shuttle describes Hardman's role, a zipper motion before the snap.

According to Chiefs coordinator Joe Bleymaier, the play call was designed primarily with the intention of a shovel pass to running back Jerick McKinnon, declined by Mahomes due to the quick penetration of the line by 49ers defensive end Nick Bosa, causing Mahomes to scramble and make the quick pass to an open Hardman. Reid corroborated this account, suggesting that the play was intended as a shovel pass for McKinnon and that the intention of Hardman's pre-snap motion was to divert the attention of defenders from the shovel pass, with Reid assuming that they would cover that motion due to its previous success.

== Broadcasting calls ==
=== Television ===
The game was called by Jim Nantz and Tony Romo on CBS. Nantz made the call of the play itself:

First and goal. Mahomes flings it! It's there! Hardman! Jackpot, Kansas City!

=== Radio ===
The national radio broadcast of the game was delivered on Westwood One by booth announcers Kevin Harlan (play by play) and Kurt Warner (analyst). Kevin Harlan's call:

First and Goal at the three. Lining up and the clock at ten seconds and ticking. In the shotgun, Mahomes. Four-man front, receiver in motion. Low snap, he runs, and he throws, caught! Touchdown! It's caught! Hardman caught the ball! The Chiefs have won! The Chiefs have won! The entire bench empties, chasing Mahomes in the endzone! Their third Super Bowl in five years! The Chiefs are back-to-back Super Bowl champions. It is a dynasty! The Chiefs have won Super Bowl 58! They're the first team to repeat in almost 20 years. Back-to-back Super Bowl champions. As the confetti flies, on the San Francisco side, stunned silence. Shocked and in disbelief. The field is the color of red and gold.

Chiefs broadcaster Mitch Holthus broadcast the call for 106.5 The Wolf, the team's flagship station. Holthus's call:

13 seconds to go in the overtime, 22-19 San Francisco. McKinnon is in at running back, first down and goal to go. Play-action fake, right sight draw, Touchdown! Kansas City! Mecole Hardman! Mecole Hardman with the catch on the right side! A three-yard touchdown pass in overtime! Kansas City wins the game, 25-22! And the Chiefs Kingdom has started its own history class, because for the first time in 6,944 days, there is a back-to-back Super Bowl champion, and it is the Kansas City Chiefs. Champions of Super Bowl 58, on the heels of Super Bowl 57."

== Cultural impact ==
The role of the play in cementing the Chiefs' dynasty was immediately noted by analysts, drawing comparison to other signature Chiefs plays called by Reid and thrown by Mahomes such as Jet Chip Wasp and Corn Dog. When asked about the naming of the play as a reference to the cartoon Tom and Jerry, in which a cat fruitlessly fails to catch a mouse, Reid responded "They’re dirty little rats, dog gone it".

CBS analyst Tony Romo was criticised for his commentary in the aftermath of the play, with critic Steve Garnder noting that given the historic context of a walk-off overtime touchdown in a Super Bowl, and the signature "Jackpot, Kansas City!" line by Jim Nantz, Romo "failed to give the historic moment time to breathe, immediately jumping into an analysis of the playcall, the midseason trade for Hardman and Mahomes' place in history."

A commemoration of the play features prominently in the design of the Chiefs' Super Bowl ring. When opened, the top of the ring reveals a hidden engraving of a diagram of the "Tom & Jerry" play.

In 2024 the Chiefs referenced the play through the addition of a "Tom and Jerry Walkoff Corn Dog" to the stadium concessions menu.

== See also ==
- Corn Dog (American football)
- Jet Chip Wasp
- 65 Toss Power Trap
