= Corn Dog (American football) =

Notable American football play in Super Bowl LVII

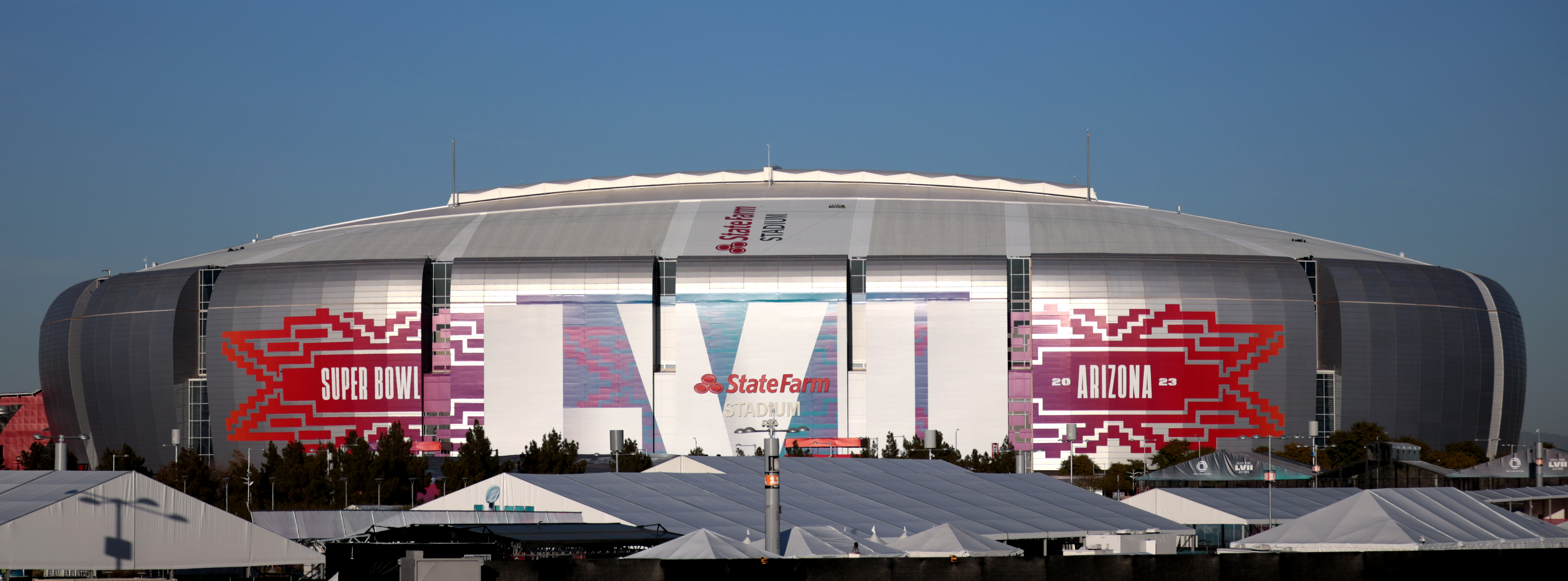
- State Farm Stadium decorated for Super Bowl LVII.
Kansas City Chiefs (1) (AFC) (14–3)	Philadelphia Eagles (1) (NFC) (14–3)
38	35
Head coach: Andy Reid	Head coach: Nick Sirianni
	1	2	3	4	Total
KC	7	7	7	17	38
PHI	7	17	3	8	35
- Date: February 12, 2023
- Kickoff time: 4:43 p.m. MST (UTC-7)
- Stadium: State Farm Stadium; Glendale, Arizona
- Favorite: Eagles by 1.5
- Referee: Carl Cheffers
- Attendance: 67,827

TV in the United States
- Network: Fox; Fox Deportes; NFL.com; NFL+
- Announcers: Kevin Burkhardt (play-by-play); Greg Olsen (analyst); Erin Andrews and Tom Rinaldi (sideline reporters); Mike Pereira (rules analyst)

Corn Dog is the name of a misdirection/lead astray offensive play used by the Kansas City Chiefs during Super Bowl LVII on February 12, 2023. The play was called twice by head coach Andy Reid and offensive coordinator Eric Bieniemy, resulting in two crucial touchdowns in the Chiefs' 38–35 victory over the Philadelphia Eagles. The unusual name and deceptive design of the play attracted widespread attention, and the plays have been considered crucial to the game's outcome.

== Background ==
Leading up to Super Bowl LVII, the Kansas City Chiefs were renowned for their creative and unorthodox offensive playbook under head coach Andy Reid.

The Chiefs' offense, led by quarterback Patrick Mahomes, frequently used shifts, motion, and misdirection to disorient opposing defenses. The "Corn Dog" play drew inspiration from a similar misdirection concept run against the Eagles by the Jacksonville Jaguars earlier in the 2022 NFL season.

== Design and execution ==
The "Corn Dog" play features a pre-snap motion that tricks defenders into anticipating a jet sweep or shallow crossing route, only for the motioning wide receiver to suddenly stop and pivot back toward the sideline. This misdirection exploits defenses in man coverage and often results in the receiver being left wide open.

The Chiefs successfully ran the play twice in Super Bowl LVII:

- Kadarius Toney touchdown (4th quarter, 12:04 remaining): Toney started in motion before quickly pivoting back to the outside, receiving a wide-open pass from Mahomes for a 5-yard touchdown that gave the Chiefs their first lead of the second half.
- Skyy Moore touchdown (4th quarter, 9:22 remaining): On the opposite side of the field, the Chiefs ran a mirrored version of the same play. Moore, a rookie wide receiver, executed the motion and pivot to perfection, scoring an untouched 4-yard touchdown that extended the Chiefs’ lead to 35–27. This reception was Moore's first touchdown in the NFL.

== Legacy ==
"Corn Dog" was described alongside the Eagles' use of the Tush Push as the defining play of the game. Alongside other plays such as Jet Chip Wasp, Corn Dog became emblematic of the Chiefs' innovative offensive style. The play has been analyzed in media breakdowns for its creativity and timing. It played a pivotal role in the Chiefs' comeback and third Super Bowl title in franchise history, and critics suggested that it belonged alongside Jet Chip Wasp and 13 Seconds as a defining moment for the Chiefs and for the legacies of Mahomes and Reid.

The following season, the Chiefs repeated as Super Bowl champions in Super Bowl LVIII, with the game concluding in overtime on a walk-off touchdown reception from Mahomes to Mecole Hardman, using the Corn Dog misdirection which the team had renamed in the snap to Tom and Jerry.

Two years later, the Chiefs and Eagles again faced each other in a rematch of this Super Bowl in Super Bowl LIX. The Chiefs lost the rematch to the Eagles, 40-22.

Both receivers involved in the plays had limited roles with the Chiefs after the Super Bowl victory. Toney appeared in 13 games during the 2023 season, scoring one touchdown, but was inactive for the postseason. The Chiefs declined the fifth-year option on his rookie contract, making him a free agent in 2024. Moore also recorded one touchdown in 2023 but missed the playoffs due to injury. He spent the following season on injured reserve before being traded to the San Francisco 49ers ahead of the 2025 season in a late-round draft pick swap.

== Cultural impact ==
The play's whimsical name sparked curiosity among fans and sports media. Although the origin of the name has not been definitively explained, it aligns with Reid’s tradition of giving quirky names to trick plays such as Jet Chip Wasp and "Shift to Rose Bowl Right Parade". Reid and Mahomes both referenced the significance of the play in postgame interviews, with Reid noting "There's nothing better than a good Corn Dog with some mustard and ketchup". Corn Dog was also included in the Chiefs playbook in Madden 25.

In 2024, the Chiefs referenced the Super Bowl LVIII-winning version of the play through the addition of a "Tom and Jerry Walkoff Corn Dog" to the stadium concessions menu.
