= Smith Center High School =

Location
- 300 Roger Barta Way; Smith Center, Kansas 66967; United States
- Coordinates: 39.780618°N 98.774444°W

Information
- School type: Public, High School
- School board: Board Website
- School district: USD 237
- CEEB code: 172785
- Principal: Greg Koelsch
- Teaching staff: 18.25 (FTE)
- Grades: 7 to 12
- Gender: coed
- Enrollment: 200 (2023-2024)
- Student to teacher ratio: 10.96
- Campus type: Rural
- Colors: Red; Green
- Athletics: Class 1A; District 14
- Athletics conference: Mid-Continent
- Mascot: Redmen
- Rival: Phillipsburg High School, Norton Community High School
- Website: School Website

Smith Center High School is a public high school located in Smith Center, Kansas, United States. It is the sole high school operated by Smith Center USD 237 school district, and serves students of grades 7 to 12. The school colors are red and green and the mascot is the Redmen.

== History ==
School District No. 4. Smith County, Smith Center, Kansas, was established in the spring of 1873, and has functioned as a district operating a public school continuously since that time, though its form, curriculum and name have been changed at times. At the beginning only a grade school curriculum was offered. At its beginning, the district was five miles square and classes were held in the second story of a building on the corner of Kansas Avenue and Main Street 1988 In the year 1888 the district established the first high school, offering a two-year course. During the next ten years seventy students were graduated from this two-year high school. some of them becoming school teachers, bankers. doctors, missionaries, abstractors, musicians merchants, farmers and many other vocations Then, in 1898, the curriculum was broadened to a four-year course, and it has remained thus until the present though many courses have been added through the years.

1874 The first building to be built by the district in 1874 was a two-story structure of native stone, located near the corner of East Court and South Jefferson, and that area was the school grounds until 1972, when the present Junior/Senior High School building was built at its present site. The year 1885 saw the completion of a new four room frame structure at the Same site and in 1898 an additional four rooms were added.

1907 In 1907 a brick building was built on the northeast corner of the same block to house the high school. This building served well: as a high school for ten years and then as a grade school building for the next 38 years.

1917 A new high school building was built in 1917 to the latest standards of that er and served well until condemned in 1972 due to ever increasing requirements of the state, and was razed soon after the present Junior/Senior High School building was built.

=== New grade school ===
A new grade school building was built in 1955 and included a new gymnasium and administrative offices all of which attached to the 1917 building. In 1960 it became necessary to add five more rooms to the grade school building due to the increased enrollment due to annexation of rural schools and the "baby boom" which followed WWII. In 1931 a vocational agriculture building was built in the block just south of the original school grounds and was used as a classroom and shop area until the present facilities were built in 1972. In 1963 a mechanical arts building was built on the cast of the vocational agriculture building. A large building was built to the south of the elementary school to accommodate the high school after most of the old high school was abandoned because of state codes. It is now used as a garage and bus barn. and that is also now used as a bus barn.

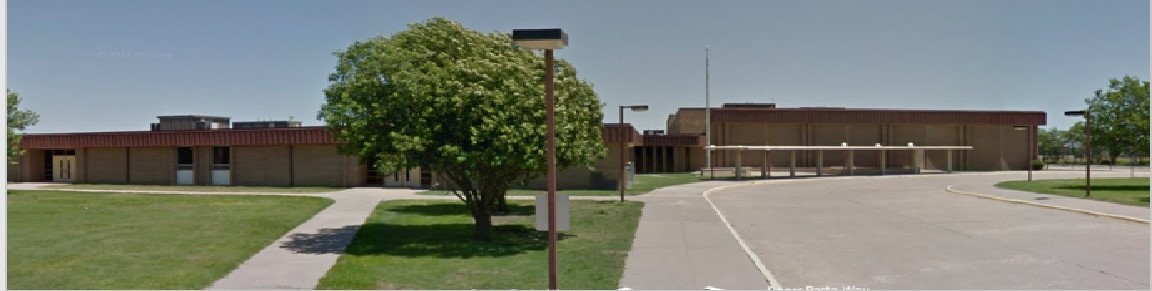

=== Current building ===
The present Junior/Senior High School building was completed on a new 36-acre site at the northeast corner of Smith Center, Built at a cost of S1.538.344.00, it contains 90.000 square feet: it has a student capacity of 525. and contains a 650-seat gymnasium, a 499-seat auditorium, administrative offices, classrooms, library, shop area, and a kitchen large enough to serve all students during lunch hour. Additional buildings were built for tech and industrial arts. In 1983 a 2000-seat metal stadium was erected and dressing rooms for athletic events were built at the athletic complex north of the new school building R. D. Hubbard (1953 graduate) was a generous contributor to the athletic complex.

== Extracurricular activities ==
The extracurricular activities offered at Smith Center High School are relatively small and limited due to the school's small size. The Redmen compete in the Mid-Continent League and are classified as a 2A school, the second-smallest classification in Kansas according to the Kansas State High School Activities Association. Throughout its history, Smith Center has won many state championships in various sports. Several graduates have gone on to participate in collegiate athletics.

=== Athletics ===
During the mid-to-late 2000s, Smith Center gained national attention due to the success of its football team which held the longest winning streak in the nation at 79 games.

==== Football ====
The Smith Center Redmen are widely considered one of the best little high school football teams in America. Throughout its history, the Smith Center football program has won 10 state championships, including a state record-tying 5 in a row from 2004 to 2008. In addition, from 2004 to 2009, the Redmen held the nation's longest winning streak at 79 games. The football program was coached by Roger Barta who was named the U.S. Army All-American Bowl Selection Committee's national coach of the year after the 2007 season. Much of the Redmen's success is credited to work ethic and dedication.

Barta won his 300th career game at Smith Center on November 13, 2009 when the Redmen defeated Meade, 10–0, in a Class 2-1A state quarterfinal playoff game. Barta was one of three active coaches in Kansas with 300 career victories, joining C.J. Hamilton of Silver Lake and Tom Young of McPherson. Barta retired from coaching after the 2012 football season.

===== 72 Points in First Quarter =====
In a 2007 playoff game against Plainville High School, the Redmen set a national high school record by scoring 72 points in the first quarter, breaking the old record set by Prescott (Ariz.) High School in 1925. The Redmen scored on touchdown runs of 50, 9, 38, 20, 3, 25 and 60 yards. They also returned an interception 33 yards for a touchdown and threw for a 14-yard touchdown, one of only two passes they completed in the game.

=== State championships ===
State Championships
Season	Sport	Number of Championships	Year
Fall	Football	10	1982, 1986, 1999, 2004, 2005, 2006, 2007, 2008, 2017, 2018
Fall	Volleyball	1	2021
Winter	Wrestling	3	2007, 2008, 2009
Winter	Basketball, Girls	1	2013
Spring	Track and Field, Boys	4	1984, 2005, 2015, 2026
Spring	Track and Field, Girls	1	1985
Spring	Golf, Boys	1	1971
Total		21	

== Notable alumni ==
- Mitch Holthus, radio announcer for the Kansas City Chiefs
- Mark Simoneau, former NFL linebacker, Super Bowl champion (XLIV), member of the College Football Hall of Fame
- Braden Wilson, NFL player
- Evelyn Wilson, Justice of the Kansas Supreme Court

== See also ==
- List of high schools in Kansas
- List of unified school districts in Kansas
