= Super Bowl LIV =

2020 National Football League championship game

San Francisco 49ers (1) (NFC) (13–3)	Kansas City Chiefs (2) (AFC) (12–4)
20	31
Head coach: Kyle Shanahan	Head coach: Andy Reid
	1	2	3	4	Total
SF	3	7	10	0	20
KC	7	3	0	21	31
- Date: February 2, 2020
- Kickoff time: 6:30 p.m. EST (UTC-5)
- Stadium: Hard Rock Stadium; Miami Gardens, Florida
- MVP: Patrick Mahomes, quarterback
- Favorite: Chiefs by 1.5
- Referee: Bill Vinovich
- Attendance: 62,417

Ceremonies
- National anthem: Demi Lovato
- Coin toss: Colonel Charles E. McGee (Ret.) with Bill Vinovich
- Halftime show: Jennifer Lopez and Shakira, featuring Bad Bunny and J Balvin

TV in the United States
- Network: Fox; Fox Deportes
- Announcers: Joe Buck (play-by-play); Troy Aikman (analyst); Erin Andrews and Chris Myers (sideline reporters); Mike Pereira (rules analyst)
- Nielsen ratings: 41.6 (national); 55.7 (Kansas City); 48.6 (San Francisco); U.S. viewership: 102.1 million viewers
- Cost of 30-second commercial: $5.6 million

Radio in the United States
- Network: Westwood One
- Announcers: Kevin Harlan (play-by-play); Kurt Warner (color commentator); Laura Okmin and Tony Boselli (sideline reporters); Gene Steratore (rules analyst)

Super Bowl LIV was an American football game played between the American Football Conference (AFC) champion Kansas City Chiefs and the National Football Conference (NFC) champion San Francisco 49ers to determine the champion of the National Football League (NFL) for the 2019 season. In the end, the Chiefs defeated the 49ers by a score of 31–20. The game was played on February 2, 2020, at Hard Rock Stadium in Miami Gardens, Florida, which is the home stadium of the Miami Dolphins. This was the eleventh Super Bowl hosted by the South Florida region and the sixth Super Bowl hosted at Hard Rock Stadium. Kansas City quarterback Patrick Mahomes was named Super Bowl MVP for the first time in his career, having completed 26 of 42 pass attempts for 286 yards, two touchdowns and two interceptions, as well as rushing for 29 yards and one touchdown.

Mahomes led Kansas City to a 12–4 regular season record and the team's third Super Bowl appearance overall, their first since Super Bowl IV. With the emergence of sixth-year quarterback Jimmy Garoppolo, the 49ers finished the regular season with a 13–3 record and advanced to their seventh Super Bowl appearance overall, their first since 2013's Super Bowl XLVII.

The first half of the game was back and forth between both teams, with the game tied 10-10 at halftime. In the third quarter, the 49ers took advantage of a Robbie Gould field goal and a touchdown run by Raheem Mostert, putting San Francisco ahead 20-10 leading into the fourth. However, in the game's final seven minutes, the Chiefs quickly overcame their 10-point deficit, with Mahomes completing two touchdown drives to Travis Kelce and Damien Williams, in addition to a late touchdown run by Williams and an interception by Kendall Fuller, to seal their comeback.

This was the Chiefs' first Super Bowl victory since Super Bowl IV in 1970, their first NFL championship since joining the league in the 1970 AFL–NFL merger, and also subsequently ended their 50-year championship drought. Kansas City's head coach Andy Reid also won his first NFL championship as a head coach, previously being defeated as the Philadelphia Eagles' head coach in Super Bowl XXXIX in 2005. The 49ers were handed their second Super Bowl loss in franchise history after Super Bowl XLVII.

The game has been positively received in retrospect with several outlets praising the Chiefs' dramatic late comeback. However, the officiating in Super Bowl LIV was met with criticism, with many questionable calls in favor of the Chiefs. The game's broadcast in the United States by Fox, along with the halftime show headlined by Jennifer Lopez and Shakira, was seen by an estimated 103 million viewers—a slight increase over Super Bowl LIII in 2019 (which had seen the smallest audience for the game in 10 years). Due to the seating capacity of Hard Rock Stadium, this game also had the fourth lowest attendance in Super Bowl history (behind Super Bowl I, Super Bowl LVIII, and Super Bowl LV the following year). This was the first time in four years that the Super Bowl did not feature the New England Patriots since they were eliminated in the Wild Card round by the Tennessee Titans.

== Background ==
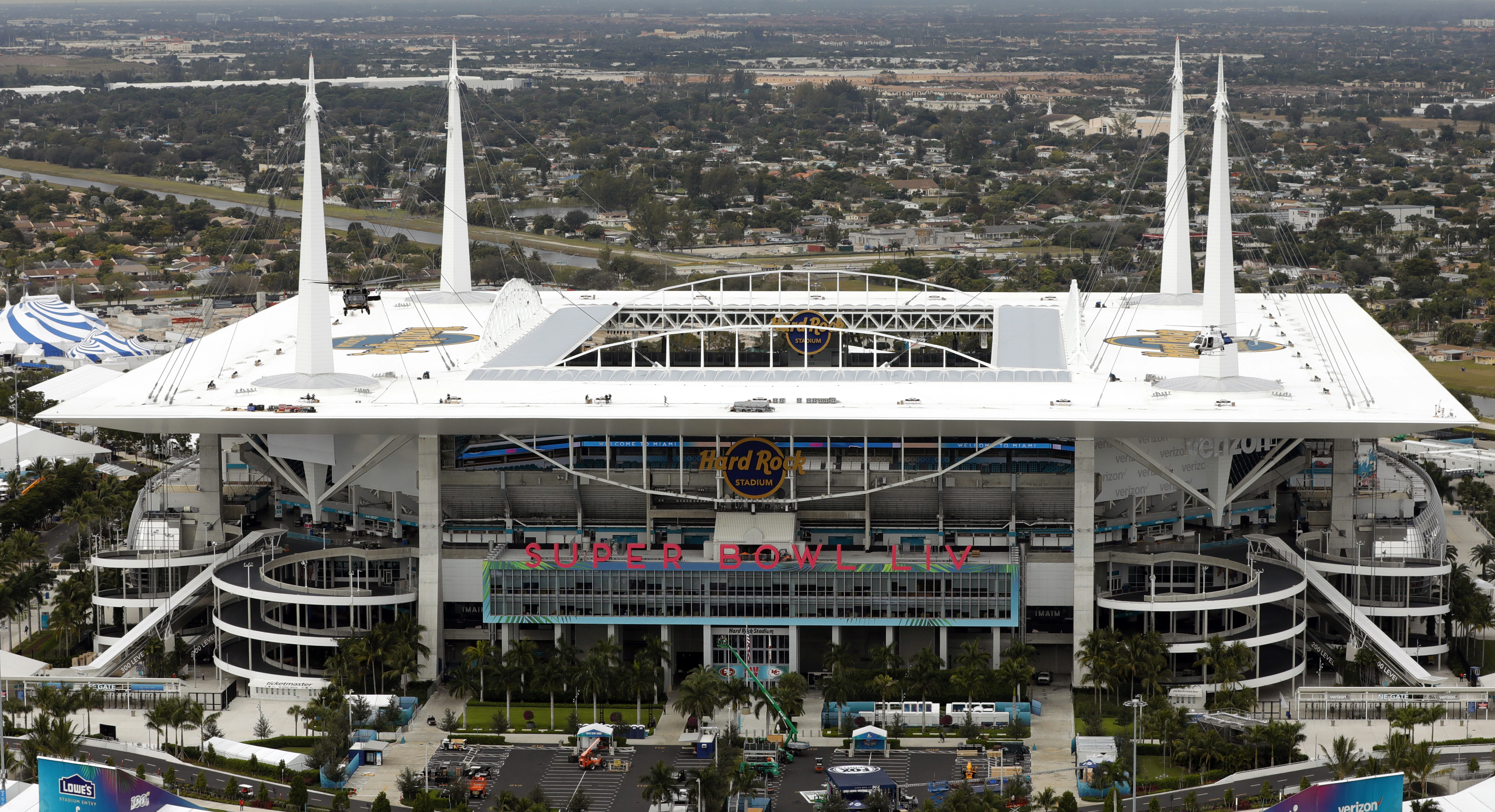
Hard Rock Stadium decorated for the Super Bowl

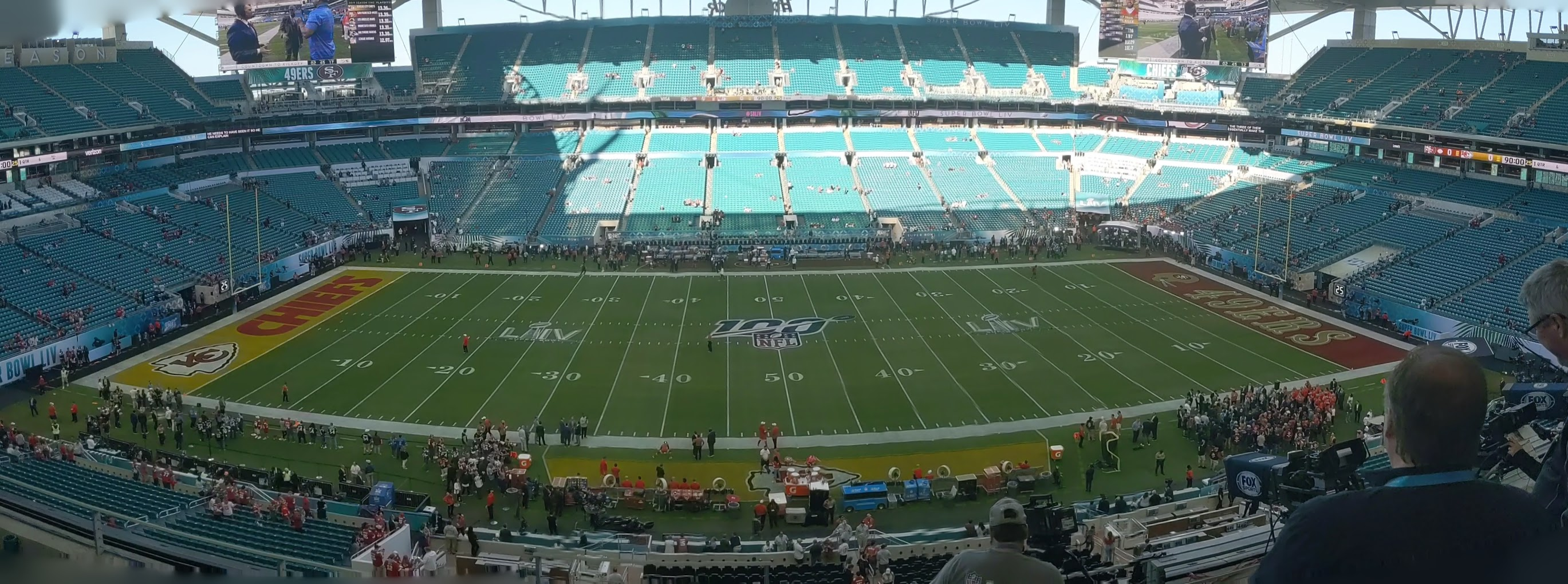
The stadium and field set for Super Bowl LIV

On May 19, 2015, the league announced the four finalists that would compete to host either Super Bowl LIII in 2019 or Super Bowl LIV. NFL owners voted on these cities in May 2016, with the first round of voting determining who would host Super Bowl LIII and the second round deciding the venue for Super Bowl LIV. The league had also originally announced in 2015 that Los Angeles would be eligible as a potential Super Bowl LIV site if there were a stadium in place and a team moved there by the start of the 2018 season.

The league opened the relocation window in January 2016, selecting the former St. Louis Rams to return to Los Angeles; their new stadium in Inglewood, California was, at the time of the vote, not scheduled to open until August 2019 (it began construction in November 2016, giving nearly three years to construct the stadium). This meant the new stadium was scheduled to be open in time for the game (and the league selected the relocating team just in time to be considered for Super Bowl LIV), but, under the current construction timetable, would require a waiver of league policy to host Super Bowl LIV, as the league does not allow stadiums in their first year of existence to host the Super Bowl to ensure stadium construction delays and unforeseen problems do not jeopardize the game. In May 2016, the league granted this waiver and confirmed that Los Angeles was still in consideration for Super Bowl LIV.

The two remaining finalists for Super Bowl LIV were Hard Rock Stadium in Miami Gardens, Florida, which last hosted Super Bowl XLIV in 2010; and Raymond James Stadium in Tampa, Florida, which last hosted Super Bowl XLIII in 2009. Miami was selected as the host site at the NFL owners meeting on May 24, 2016.

David Grutman—founder of the popular nightclub LIV at Fontainebleau Miami Beach—stated that he had no issues with the coincidence of Miami hosting Super Bowl LIV, embracing it as free publicity. The club—which first opened in 2008, has regularly hosted professional athletes, and also operates a club and luxury seating section at Hard Rock Stadium—had been named in honor of the hotel first opening in 1954, and as an homage to New York City's Studio 54. Of the NFL's onerous enforcement of venues using league trademarks (such as "Super Bowl") for promotional purposes, Grutman stated that "we don't write the words Super Bowl LIV on anything. This is their mark and their weekend, and we're just so happy that they're doing it in Miami."

== Teams ==
=== San Francisco 49ers ===
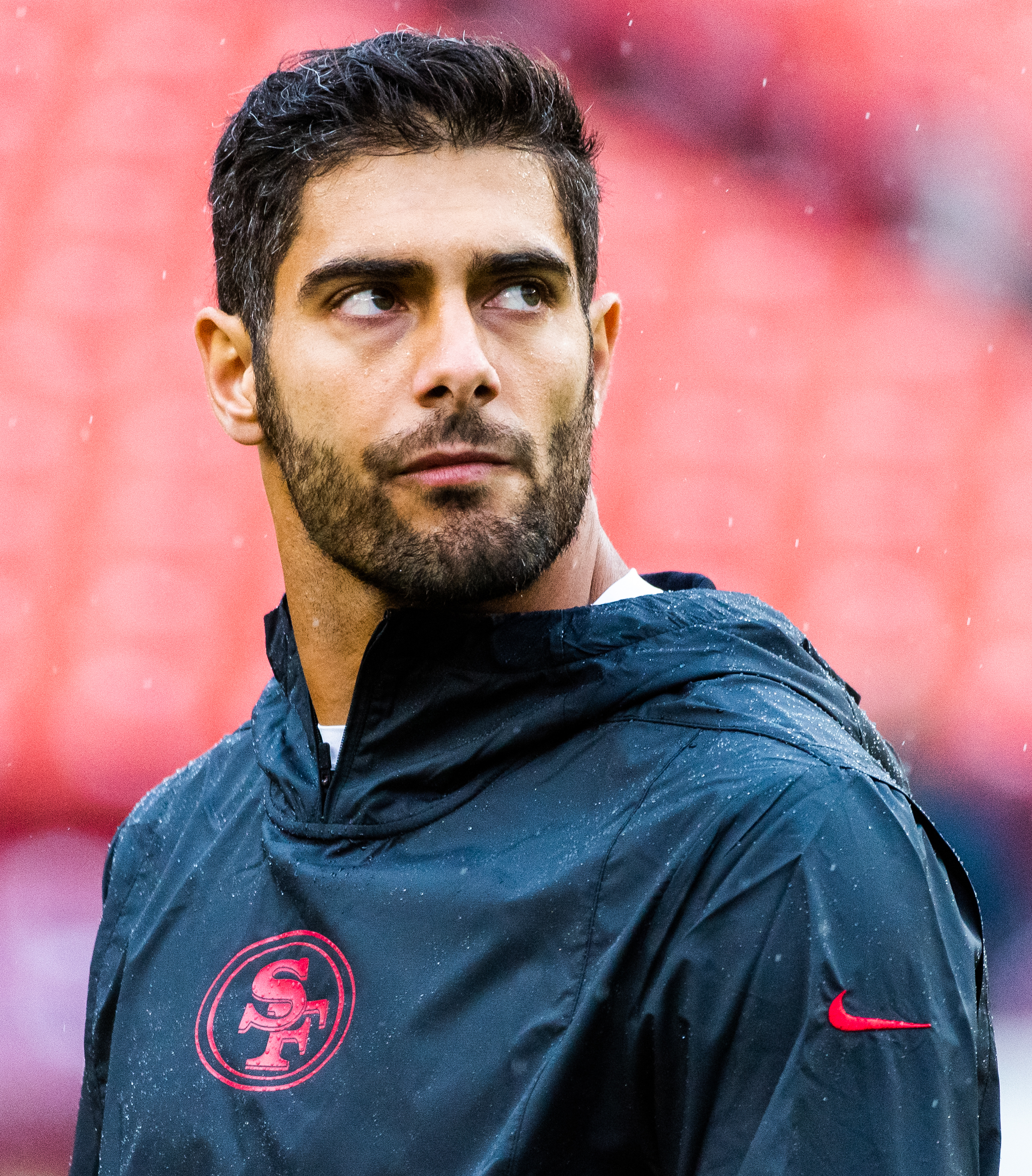
Garoppolo in 2019

The San Francisco 49ers finished the 2019 season with an NFC-best 13–3 record under third-year head coach Kyle Shanahan. San Francisco's rise to the top came as a surprise to the league. They had finished the previous season 4–12 and had not recorded a winning record since 2013.

One big reason for the 49ers' success was the emergence of quarterback Jimmy Garoppolo. Garoppolo began his career in 2014 as a backup to New England Patriots quarterback Tom Brady, winning Super Bowls XLIX and LI. After two uneventful seasons, Garoppolo's playing time increased substantially in 2016, due to Brady's suspension and because of several large late-game leads. Garoppolo showed potential, with a 113.3 passer rating over a span of six games. The following season, with San Francisco struggling at 0–8, they traded a second-round draft pick for Garoppolo, who led the 49ers to five straight wins to finish the season. Although he missed most of the 2018 season with a torn anterior cruciate ligament sustained vs. the Chiefs at Arrowhead Stadium, Garoppolo recovered in time for the 2019 season, starting all 16 games.

San Francisco's offense finished second in the NFL in points scored (479) and fourth in yards (6,079). Garoppolo completed 69.1% of his passes (fourth in the NFL) for 3,978 yards and 27 touchdowns (fifth), with 13 interceptions. His top pass-catcher was tight end George Kittle, who caught 85 passes for 1,053 yards and five touchdowns. Other key targets included rookie Deebo Samuel (57 receptions, 807 yards, 159 rushing yards, six total touchdowns) and veteran Emmanuel Sanders (36 receptions, 502 yards, three touchdowns). The 49ers ground game was led by running back Raheem Mostert, who had bounced around five different teams in his first two seasons before settling into San Francisco in 2017. Although Mostert did not start any games in 2019, he led the team in rushing with 772 yards and eight touchdowns, with an average of 5.6 yards per carry, while also catching 14 passes for 180 yards and two more touchdowns. Running backs Matt Breida (623 rushing yards, 19 receptions) and Tevin Coleman (544 rushing yards, 21 receptions, 180 receiving yards, seven total touchdowns) also made big impacts on offense, while fullback Kyle Juszczyk made the Pro Bowl, catching 20 passes for 239 yards. San Francisco's offensive line was led by 13-year veteran tackle Joe Staley, a six-time Pro Bowl selection.

The 49ers defense ranked second in the NFL in fewest yards allowed (4,509) and first in fewest passing yards (2,707). The team had an outstanding defensive line, featuring linemen DeForest Buckner (61 tackles, 7.5 sacks, four fumble recoveries), Arik Armstead (54 tackles, 10 sacks), Dee Ford (6.5 sacks), an off-season pickup from the Chiefs, and rookie Nick Bosa (47 tackles, nine sacks, two fumble recoveries). The linebackers were led by Fred Warner (team leading 118 tackles, three sacks, three forced fumbles) and Dre Greenlaw (64 tackles, one sack). Defensive back Richard Sherman led the team in interceptions with three, earning his fifth career Pro Bowl selection before adding two more interceptions in the playoffs.

This was the 49ers' seventh Super Bowl appearance and their first since Super Bowl XLVII in 2013, when they lost to the Baltimore Ravens 34–31. The 49ers had a 5–1 record in their previous six appearances. A sixth Super Bowl victory would have tied the New England Patriots and the Pittsburgh Steelers with the most Super Bowl championships in the league.

=== Kansas City Chiefs ===
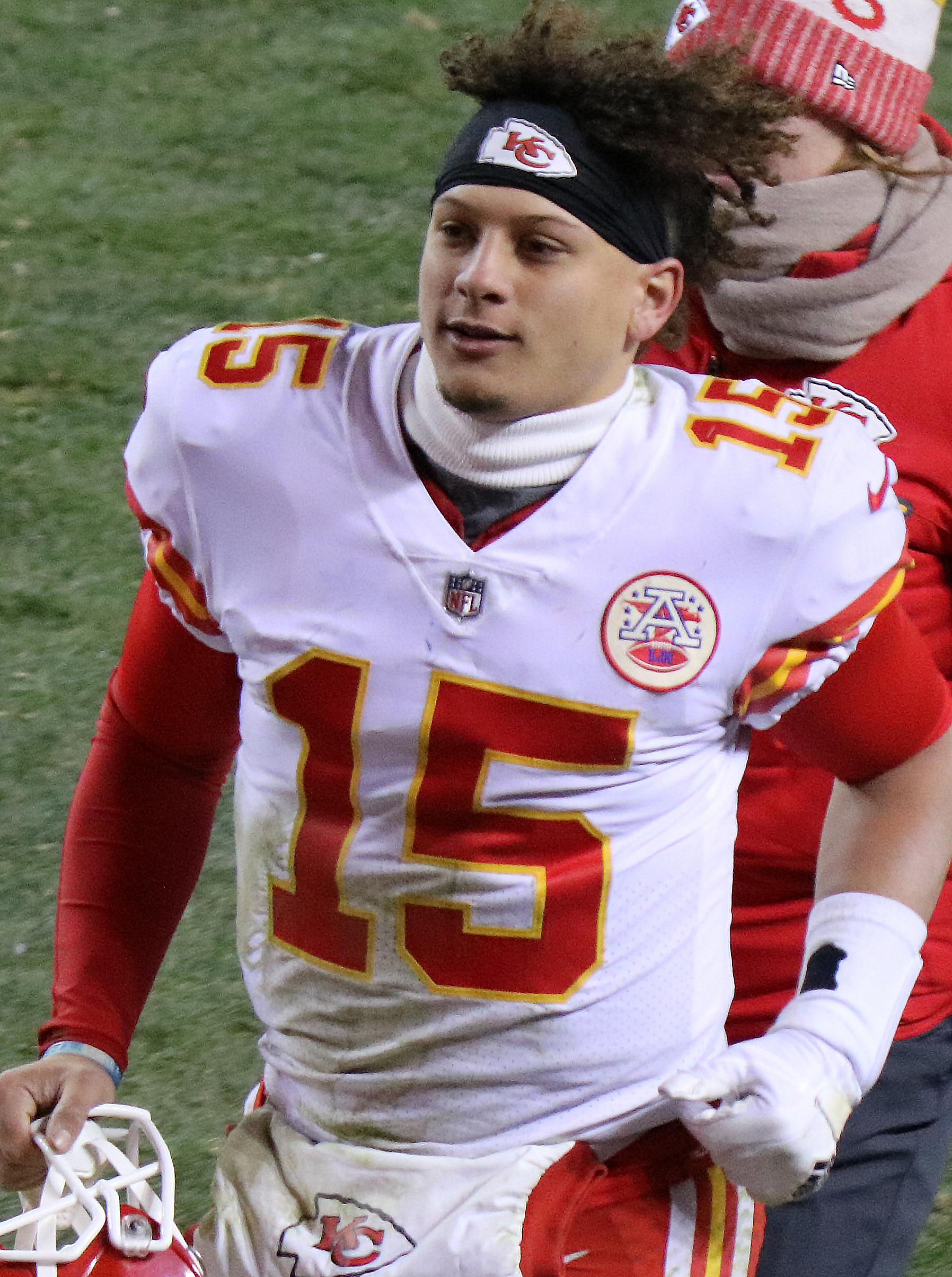
Mahomes in 2017.

The Kansas City Chiefs finished the 2019 season with a 12–4 record under Andy Reid, who was serving in his 21st consecutive season as an NFL head coach. The 2019 season marked the Chiefs' fourth straight AFC West title and sixth playoff appearance in seven seasons under Reid.

Patrick Mahomes, their first round draft pick from 2017, quarterbacked the team. Mahomes had previously won the NFL Most Valuable Player award in the 2018 season, when he threw for 5,097 yards and 50 touchdowns as he led the Chiefs to a 12–4 record, along with a trip to the AFC championship game. In 2019, the team had to overcome some important personnel losses. Two of their top players from 2018, running back Kareem Hunt and linebacker Dee Ford, played elsewhere in 2019, while Mahomes and wide receiver Tyreek Hill both missed several games with injuries. Still, the team was able to repeat a 12–4 record and earn the No. 2 seed.

Mahomes was selected for the 2020 Pro Bowl, despite missing two games due to a dislocated patella; he threw passes for 4,031 yards and 26 touchdowns with only five interceptions, and rushed for 218 yards and two touchdowns. In the two games Mahomes missed, backup Matt Moore filled in and threw for 659 yards and six touchdowns, with no interceptions. The Chiefs' passing attack was ranked second in the NFL. Mahomes' top receiver was Pro Bowl tight end Travis Kelce, who caught 97 passes for 1,229 yards and five touchdowns, making him the first NFL tight end to have four consecutive seasons with at least 1,000 yards in pass receptions. His other targets included Hill, who earned his fourth Pro Bowl selection despite missing four games, catching 58 passes for 860 yards and seven touchdowns, Sammy Watkins with 52 catches for 673 yards and three touchdowns, and Demarcus Robinson with 32 catches for 449 yards and three touchdowns. Rookie receiver Mecole Hardman added 26 catches for 538 yards and six touchdowns. On special teams, Hardman ranked third in the NFL in kickoff return yards (704) and fifth in return average (26.1 yards), while also returning 18 punts for 167 yards, earning him a Pro Bowl selection as a special teams returner. The Chiefs' running game was ranked 23rd in the league, led by Damien Williams, who was their leading rusher with 498 yards and five touchdowns, while also catching 30 passes for 213 yards and two more scores. LeSean McCoy also contributed 465 yards and four touchdowns, along with 28 receptions. Kicker Harrison Butker led the NFL in scoring (147 points) and field goals (34), while ranking sixth in field goal percentage (89.4%). The Chiefs' offense was ranked fifth in the NFL in points scored (451) and sixth in yards gained (6,067).

Kansas City's defense ranked seventh in league in points allowed (308). Their defensive line featured two Pro Bowl selections, Chris Jones, who recorded nine sacks, and Frank Clark who had eight sacks and three forced fumbles, along with Emmanuel Ogbah, who had 5.5 sacks in 10 games. Linebackers Anthony Hitchens and Damien Wilson led the team in tackles with 88 and 81, respectively. The Chiefs defense was bolstered late in the season when they claimed 16-year veteran linebacker Terrell Suggs off waivers from the Arizona Cardinals in week 14. Suggs finished the season with 4 forced fumbles and 6.5 sacks. Tyrann Mathieu, in his first season with the Chiefs, tallied four interceptions, two sacks and 75 tackles, which was enough to earn his second career Associated Press first-team All-Pro selection as a defensive back. He was also listed second-team All-Pro as a safety. Rookie safety Juan Thornhill added three interceptions and 57 tackles, but was lost for the season with a torn anterior cruciate ligament in week 17. Cornerback Bashaud Breeland had two interceptions and two fumble recoveries, which he returned for 114 yards and a touchdown.

This was the Chiefs' third Super Bowl appearance and their first since the AFL–NFL merger in 1970. The Chiefs were 1–1 in their two previous Super Bowl appearances: they lost Super Bowl I in 1967 to the Green Bay Packers (35–10) and won Super Bowl IV in 1970, defeating the Minnesota Vikings 23–7. This was also Andy Reid's second Super Bowl appearance as a head coach, after Super Bowl XXXIX in 2005 when he was Philadelphia Eagles head coach, which they lost 24–21 to the New England Patriots. Entering Super Bowl LIV, Reid's 221 victories made him the head coach with the most wins without a Super Bowl championship since the advent of the Super Bowl game.

=== Playoffs ===
In the playoffs, the 49ers earned a first-round bye as the NFC's first seed. In the divisional round, they defeated the Minnesota Vikings, 27–10. The 49ers dominated this game, outperforming the Vikings in time of possession (38:27–21:33), first downs (21–7), rushing yards (186–21) and total yards (308–147). In the NFC Championship Game, the 49ers led by 27–0 at half time over the Green Bay Packers on their way to a 37–20 win. San Francisco set the record for the fewest passes in an NFC championship victory, throwing the ball only eight times. Instead they relied mostly on their running game, with 42 rushes for 285 yards, including a franchise record 220 yards and four touchdowns by Raheem Mostert.

Meanwhile, the Chiefs also had a first-round bye as the AFC's second seed. In the divisional round, they fell behind 24–0 to the Houston Texans, but rallied to take a 28–24 half time lead; they dominated the second half and ended with a 51–31 win. During the comeback, the Chiefs scored touchdowns on an NFL record seven consecutive drives, including five touchdown passes by Mahomes. Their next opponent was the 6th-seeded Tennessee Titans, who advanced to the AFC championship by beating the 12–4 New England Patriots and 14–2 Baltimore Ravens, mainly due to the dominating performance of running back Derrick Henry, who gained over 200 yards from scrimmage in each game. The Chiefs defeated the Titans, holding Henry to just 61 total yards, with negative yardage in the second half. Kansas City rallied back from a 17–7 deficit in the second quarter by scoring four unanswered touchdowns to win the game 35–24. Mahomes threw 294 yards and three touchdowns, and also led Kansas City in rushing with 53 yards on the ground, including a 27-yard touchdown scramble.

=== Pre-game notes ===
The Chiefs were the designated home team for Super Bowl LIV, as the home team alternates between the two conferences annually. As the designated home team, the Chiefs elected to wear their standard red home jerseys with white pants. The 49ers wore their standard white away jerseys with gold pants. This was the first time two teams with red as a primary uniform color met in the Super Bowl. The 49ers reportedly sought special permission to wear their all-white third jersey combination, which would have required special approval from the league; approval was not granted.

Gambling establishments had the Chiefs as 1.5-point favorites to open and set the projected total points to 52.5. Both figures moved to 1 and 53 shortly thereafter.

49ers head coach Kyle Shanahan joined his father Mike Shanahan as the first father-son duo to lead their teams to a Super Bowl as head coaches. The elder Shanahan previously won Super Bowls XXXII and XXXIII as head coach of the Denver Broncos.

49ers offensive assistant Katie Sowers became the first woman and the first openly gay person to coach in any Super Bowl.

Hall of Fame quarterback Joe Montana, who played for both teams during his NFL career, joked on Twitter saying: "You heard from me first. I guarantee my team will win the Super Bowl!"

Marlins Park hosted Super Bowl Opening Night. Bayfront Park hosted Super Bowl Live, while the Miami Beach Convention Center hosted the Super Bowl Experience.

=== Team facilities ===
The Chiefs used the Miami Dolphins practice facility in Davie and stayed at the JW Marriott Turnberry. The 49ers practiced at the University of Miami in Coral Gables and stayed at the JW Marriott Marquis.

== Broadcasting ==
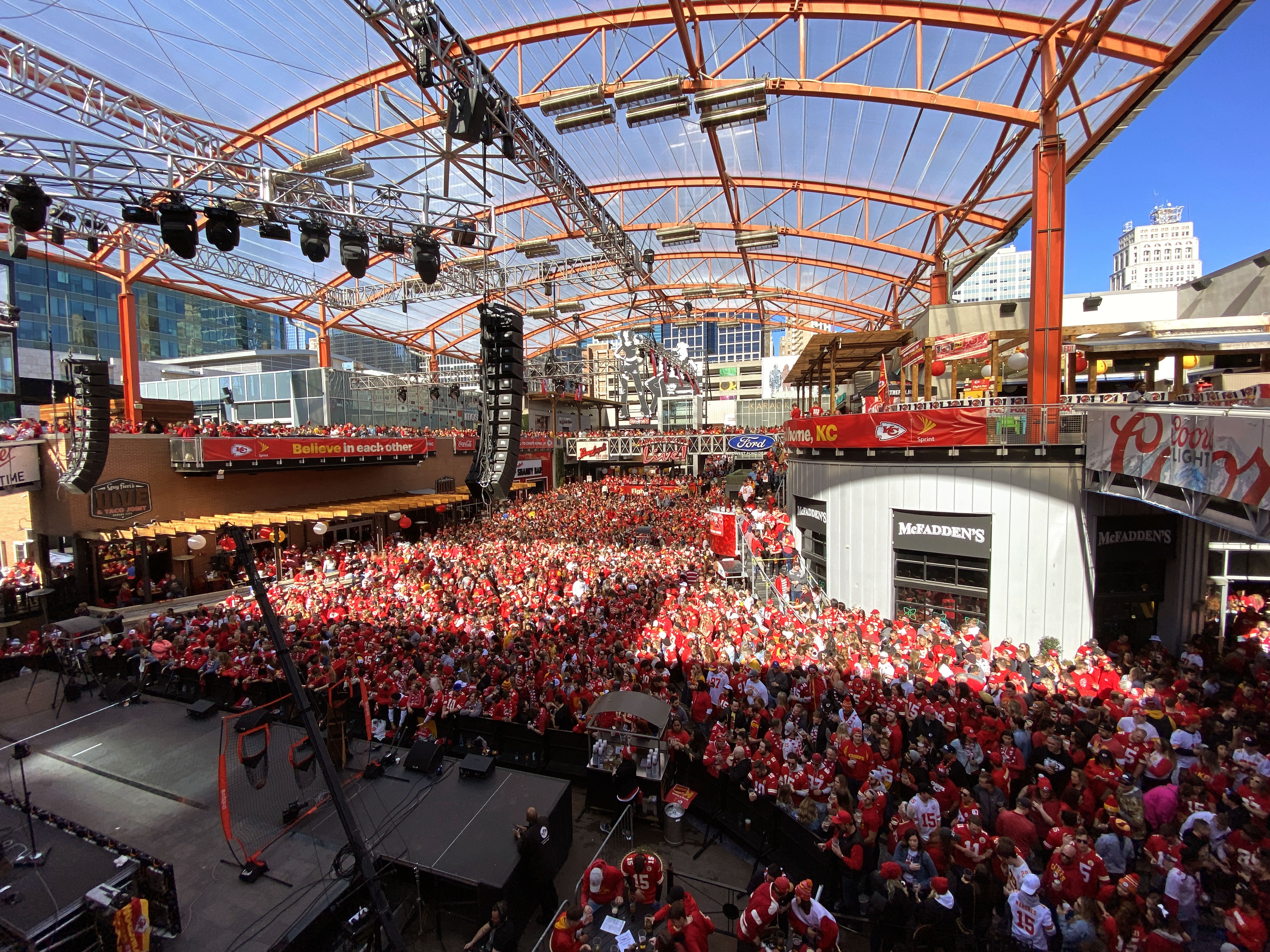
Fans gather at Kansas City Power & Light District for a watch party

=== United States ===
==== Television ====
Super Bowl LIV was televised by Fox, per the three-year rotation between CBS, Fox and NBC, the NFL's three network broadcast partners. The broadcast team for Fox consisted of Joe Buck on play-by-play and Troy Aikman on color commentary in their sixth and final Super Bowl together on Fox before their departures to ESPN in 2022. Buck's father Jack had announced the Chiefs' Super Bowl win 50 years prior for CBS Sports.

Fox Deportes aired the game in Spanish with Adrian Garcia-Marquez on play-by-play and Rolando Cantú as color commentator.

===== Production =====
Similarly to its Thursday Night Football broadcasts, Fox produced its Super Bowl LIV broadcast in 1080p high definition with HLG high-dynamic-range color, upconverted to a 4K ultra-high-definition feed available through participating pay TV providers and the Fox Sports app on supported streaming devices. Fox ruled out a native 4K telecast, citing the intensive internal bandwidth requirements needed to process 4K camera feeds during a telecast of this scale. Fox also introduced a new on-air appearance for football telecasts (which also included Fox's XFL broadcasts that began the following weekend). Fox's new graphics included a new scoreboard, which also included real-time quarterback and rushing statistics between plays, as well as the use of illustrated portraits of key players as opposed to photos.

Fox constructed a broadcast plaza in South Beach along Ocean Drive, which originated FS1's studio programs during the week leading up to the game and served as the main location for its pregame show. The campus also featured public activities such as the "Fox VIP Screening Room", a Lego sculpture gallery promoting the upcoming Fox series Lego Masters, and a 70 foot (21 m) The Masked Singer-themed ferris wheel.

===== Advertising =====
Fox charged between $5 million and $5.6 million for 30 seconds of commercial time during Super Bowl LIV. On November 22, 2019, Fox announced that it had sold its entire in-game advertising inventory. As part of NFL initiatives to adjust and optimize commercial load during games, Fox aired four breaks per quarter rather than five, but each break was longer. Fox's executive vice president of sports sales Seth Winter said these changes had increased the early demand for commercial time during the game.

Two candidates in the 2020 presidential election bought spots during the game, including the presidential election campaigns of Donald Trump and Democratic candidate Michael Bloomberg. The game fell on the eve of the Iowa caucuses, the first major contest of the 2020 Democratic primaries. It was reported that due to concerns from other advertisers, only Fox network promos would air alongside the political ads during their respective breaks. In contrast to its largest collection of Super Bowl ad buys in 2019, perennial sponsor Anheuser-Busch purchased only four 60-second spots, fewer than previous years.

The Super Bowl Ad Meter survey conducted by USA Today was won by a Groundhog Day-themed spot for the Jeep Gladiator (tying into the game itself falling on Groundhog Day), starring Bill Murray. The A.V. Club chose as the best ad of the night one for attorney Darryl Isaacs, whose law firm paid for a large-budget space opera homage.

===== Lead-out programs =====
On May 13, 2019, Fox announced that its lead-out program would be the season three premiere of The Masked Singer.

==== Streaming ====
Digitally, the game was available via Fox Sports' streaming platforms, the Yahoo! Sports mobile app and the NFL mobile app. The Yahoo! Sports app and stream was part of a long-term deal between the NFL and Verizon Media.

==== Radio ====
Nationally, Westwood One broadcast the game in the United States. Kevin Harlan, the Chiefs' radio broadcaster from 1985 to 1993, called the play-by-play, joined in the booth by Kurt Warner on color commentary; Laura Okmin and Tony Boselli contributed sideline reports, while Gene Steratore served as rules analyst.

Locally, each team's flagship station, KNBR/KSAN in San Francisco and KCFX in Kansas City (all Cumulus Media stations), also carried the game in their local metropolitan areas. For Kansas City, Mitch Holthus was on play-by-play with Kendall Gammon on color commentary and B.J. Kissel with sideline reports, while San Francisco had Greg Papa on play-by-play with Tim Ryan on color commentary. By coincidence, it was KCFX's last Chiefs game under a 30-year-long contract, as the team's games moved to Entercom's WDAF-FM in the 2020 season.

==== Viewing statistics ====
Fox reported an overall digital, broadcast and subscription audience of 102 million, an increase of 1.3 million from Super Bowl LIII. Nielsen Ratings measured 99.9 million viewers to the main Fox broadcast, also up from the 98.2 million who had watched Super Bowl LIII on CBS, while the Fox Deportes Spanish broadcast drew 310,000 viewers. An uptick to 103 million was noted during the halftime show. Viewership declined at a rate of approximately 5 million viewers per hour over the course of the game.

=== International ===
In Canada, Super Bowl LIV was televised by CTV, TSN, RDS (in French) and DAZN. In December 2019, considering an appeal of a prior decision at the request of Bell Media, the Supreme Court of Canada overturned a ruling that had allowed the Canadian Radio-television and Telecommunications Commission to restrict use of the simultaneous substitution (simsub) regulations for the Super Bowl in order to allow access to the U.S. commercials (which they had deemed, by public response, to be an integral part of the telecast). The court held that the CRTC's exception in policy overstepped its power under the Broadcasting Act, citing that it does not allow the CRTC to "impose terms and conditions on the distribution of programming services generally".

In the United Kingdom and Ireland, the game was televised on the free-to-air channel BBC One and paid-subscription channels Sky Sports Main Event and Sky Sports Mix. In Italy, it was on the free-to-air Italian channel Canale 20 and paid-subscription channel DAZN. In Latin America, the game was broadcast by ESPN and Fox Sports. In Brazil, Super Bowl LIV was televised by ESPN Brasil and exhibited in the movie theatre chains Cinemark, UCI and Kinoplex. In Australia, the game was televised on the free-to-air Seven Network and pay TV ESPN Australia (with Seven airing the Fox feed and ESPN using a secondary broadcast produced by ESPN International with the Monday Night Football commentary team of Joe Tessitore and Booger McFarland, in what would be their final game due to a major revamp of the MNF booth the following season). It was also broadcast on Melbourne radio network 1116 SEN and commenated by Gerard Whateley for the third straight year. In Germany, the game was televised on the free-to-air German channel Prosieben and paid-subscription channel DAZN. In France, the game was broadcast on TF1 for the second consecutive year and by the paid-subscription channel BeIN Sports. In Sweden, the game was broadcast on free-to-air channel TV6.

9.55 million viewers watched the Canadian broadcast and 3.66 million watched the Mexican broadcast. 18 million Canadians and 12 million Mexicans watched at least one minute of the game.

== Entertainment ==
=== Pre-game ceremonies ===
The game was held one week after the Calabasas helicopter crash that killed basketball legend Kobe Bryant, his 13-year-old daughter Gianna and seven others. The victims were honored in a tribute, with 49ers and Chiefs players lined up at opposite 24-yard lines in homage to Bryant's jersey number 24. Also honored was former All-Pro defensive end Chris Doleman, who died from glioblastoma five days earlier.

Players and coaches selected to the NFL's 100th Anniversary All-Time Team were introduced in an on-field ceremony. Those living members in attendance wore red jackets with the NFL's 100th anniversary patch on them.

Yolanda Adams performed "America the Beautiful", while Demi Lovato performed "The Star-Spangled Banner". The anthem was concluded with a flyover by two F/A-18E/F Super Hornets and two F-35C Lightning IIs (Marine Fighter Attack Squadron VMFAT-501) from the U.S. Navy and U.S. Marine Corps.

Four 100-year-old World War II veterans participated in the coin toss ceremony: Colonel Charles E. McGee, Lieutenant Colonel Samuel Lombardo, Staff Sergeant Odón Sanchez Cardenas and Corporal Sidney Walton. McGee had the honors of presenting the coin.

=== Halftime show ===
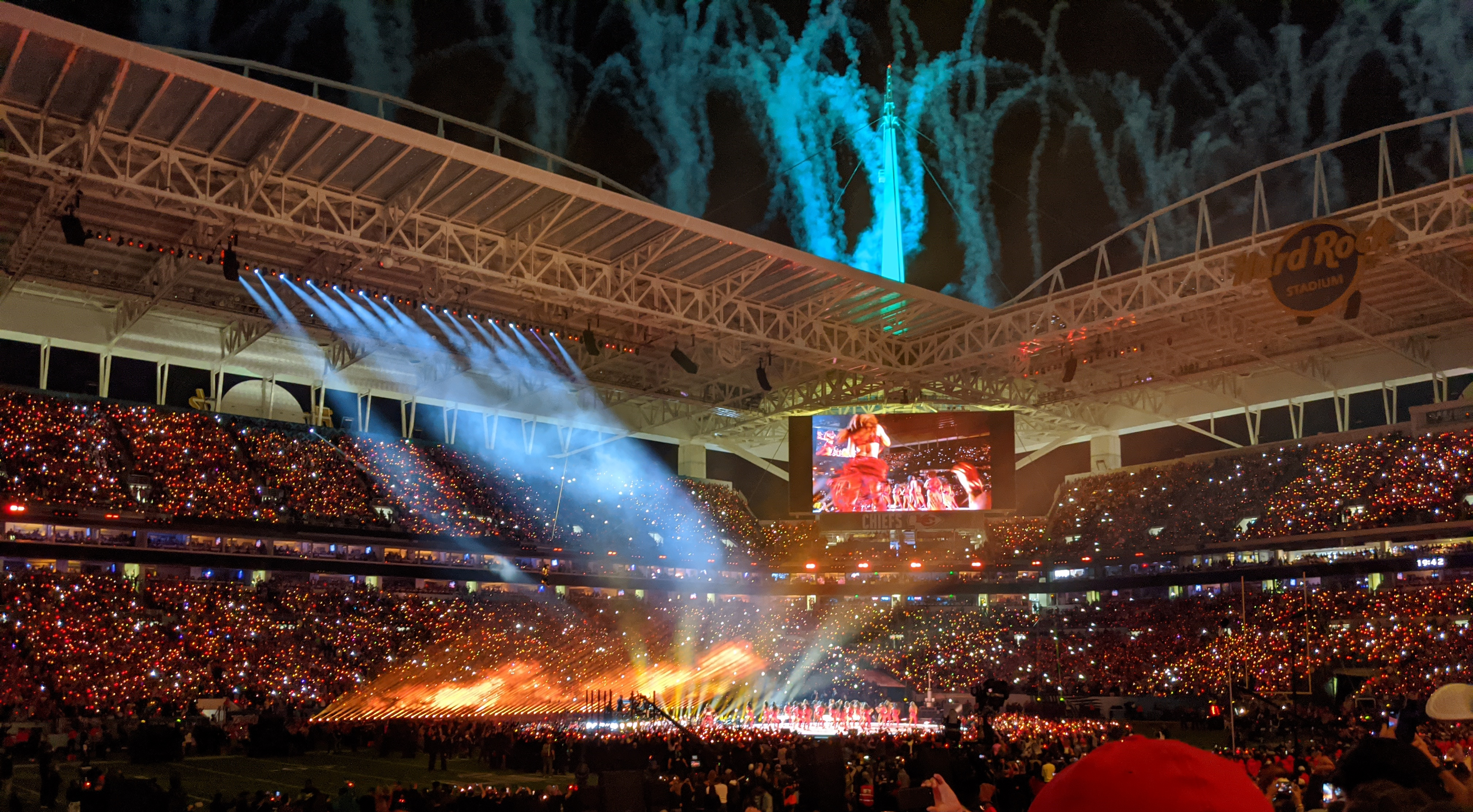
Shakira performing "Whenever, Wherever" during the halftime show.

The halftime show was led by Jennifer Lopez and Shakira. Guests performers J Balvin and Bad Bunny featured during the show, as well as Lopez's daughter, Emme Muñiz. Lopez's five outfits were designed by Versace and her styling team designed 213 costumes and 143 pairs of shoes for Lopez and her dancers. Shakira's three outfits were by Norwegian designer Peter Dundas and featured nearly 2 million Swarovski crystals. The show was produced by NFL Network, Jay-Z and Roc Nation. The primary sponsor was Pepsi.

== Game summary ==
External videos
- Full game broadcast on Fox on YouTube

=== First half ===
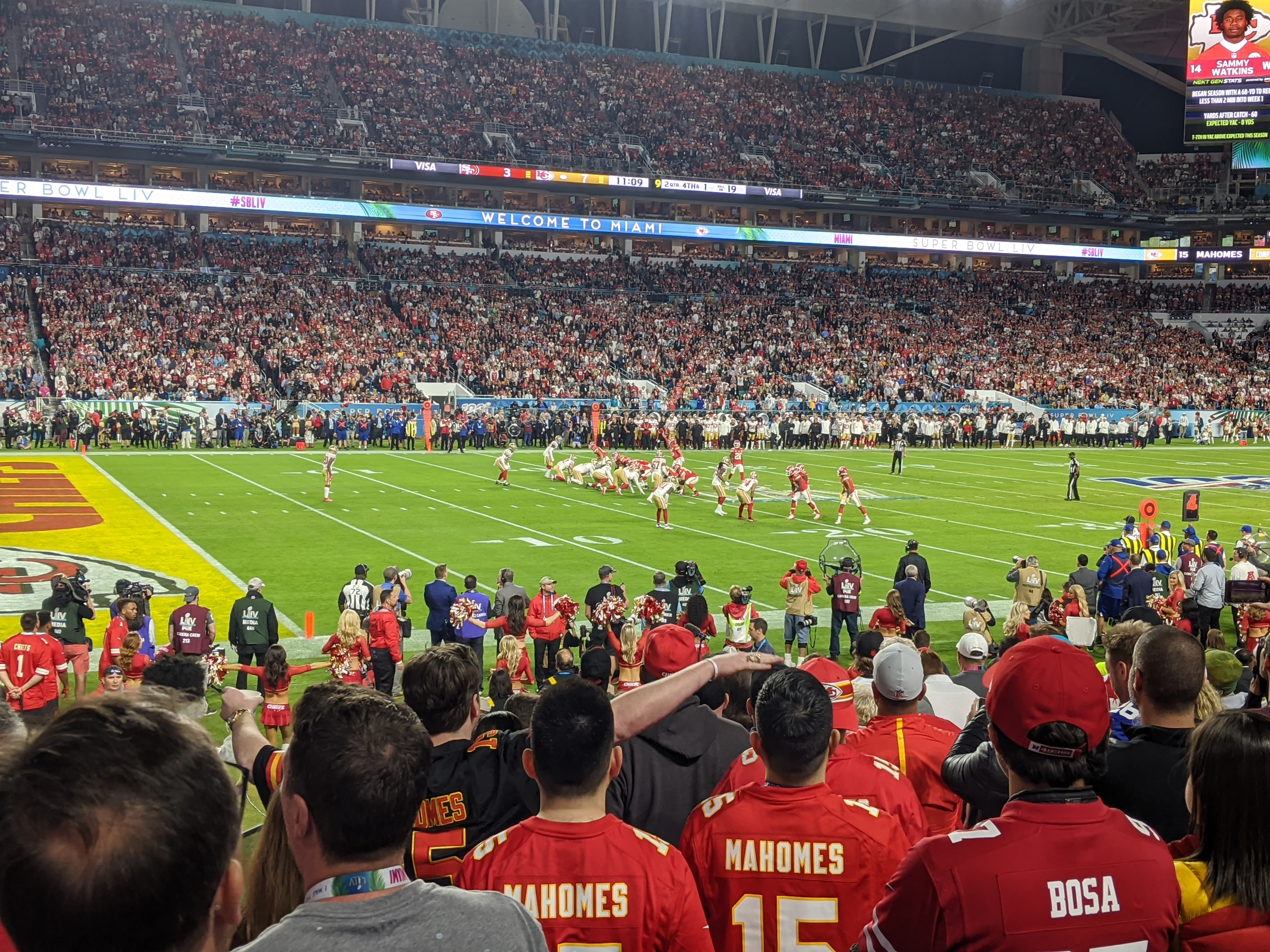
Kansas City on offense in the second quarter.

San Francisco won the coin toss and deferred, allowing the Chiefs to start with the ball. After forcing the Chiefs to a three-and-out on the opening drive, the 49ers drove 62 yards in 10 plays, including a 32-yard run by wide receiver Deebo Samuel. Kicker Robbie Gould finished the drive with a 38-yard field goal to give the 49ers an early 3–0 lead. Kansas City responded by driving 75 yards in 15 plays, which took 7:26 off the clock. Quarterback Patrick Mahomes completed five of seven passes for 40 yards on the drive, while running back Damien Williams rushed four times for 25 yards. Mahomes finished the drive with a 1-yard touchdown run to give the Chiefs a 7–3 lead with 31 seconds left in the first quarter. It was the first deficit San Francisco faced in the postseason.

Two plays into the second quarter, a heavy rush by defensive tackle Chris Jones forced quarterback Jimmy Garoppolo to throw a hurried pass that was intercepted by cornerback Bashaud Breeland, giving Kansas City a first down on their own 44-yard line. Mahomes completed a 28-yard pass to wide receiver Sammy Watkins on the next play, sparking a 43-yard drive that ended with kicker Harrison Butker making a 31-yard field goal, giving the Chiefs a 10–3 lead. The 49ers responded by moving the ball 80 yards in seven plays, with Samuel picking up 27 yards on two receptions. On the last play, Garoppolo threw the ball to fullback Kyle Juszczyk, who managed to make the catch through tight coverage by safety Daniel Sorensen, break a tackle and then dive into the end zone for a 15-yard touchdown, tying the game at 10–10 with just over five minutes left in the half. After a Kansas City punt, Garoppolo completed a 42-yard pass to tight end George Kittle, but this was nullified by an offensive pass interference penalty against Kittle. With the penalty pushing them back to their own 35-yard line, the 49ers let the remaining six seconds expire to end the half with the score tied at 10–10, the fourth time a Super Bowl had been tied at the midway point.

=== Second half ===
San Francisco took the second half kickoff and drove 60 yards in nine plays, with wide receiver Emmanuel Sanders catching back-to-back passes for 20 yards, Samuel rushing for 14 yards and Juszczyk hauling in a 14-yard reception. Gould finished the drive with a 42-yard field goal, giving the 49ers a 13–10 lead. Linebacker Fred Warner intercepted Mahomes on a pass intended for wide receiver Tyreek Hill on the next drive, returning it three yards to the San Francisco 45-yard line. Garoppolo started the ensuing drive with a 16-yard pass to Samuel. Three plays later, on 3rd-and-8, he threw a 26-yard pass to wide receiver Kendrick Bourne and then followed it up with a 10-yard pass to Juszczyk on the Chiefs 1-yard line. Running back Raheem Mostert ran the ball into the end zone on the next play, increasing the 49ers' lead to 20–10 with 2:35 left in the third quarter.

On Kansas City's next drive, which carried into the fourth quarter, they reached the San Francisco 23-yard line. On 3rd-and-6, however, Mahomes threw another pass intended for Hill that was slightly behind the receiver. Hill tried to reach back for it, but the ball bounced off his arm and was intercepted by safety Tarvarius Moore, who returned it seven yards to the 49ers 20-yard line with 11:57 left in the game. After the Kansas City defense rallied to force a punt, the Chiefs moved the ball 62 yards in 10 plays. During the drive, Mahomes appeared to complete a 17-yard pass to Hill on 2nd-and-15, but a replay challenge by the 49ers determined that Hill did not secure the catch as he went to the ground, bringing up 3rd-and-15. On the next play, Mahomes completed a 44-yard pass to Hill from the Kansas City 35-yard line, which the former called "Jet Chip Wasp". Two plays later, Moore committed pass interference while trying to cover tight end Travis Kelce in the end zone, moving the ball 20 yards to the San Francisco 1-yard line, and Mahomes threw to Kelce for a touchdown on the next play, cutting the Chiefs' deficit to 20–17 with 6:13 left in the game. Kansas City then forced a three-and-out and quickly stormed back for another score, advancing 65 yards in seven plays, the longest a 38-yard completion from Mahomes to Watkins. On 3rd-and-goal from the 5-yard line, Mahomes threw the ball to Williams, who just managed to stretch the ball across the goal line before going out of bounds. The touchdown was a close call, but was upheld by a booth review, giving Kansas City a 24–20 lead with 2:44 remaining in the game.

With the chance to mount a game-winning drive, the 49ers drove to the Kansas City 49-yard line but turned the ball over on downs after three incomplete passes and Garoppolo getting sacked on 4th-and-10 by defensive end Frank Clark with 1:33 left in the game. Trying to run out the clock with the ground game, Williams carried the ball on the next two plays, first picking up 4 yards and then going the distance for a 38-yard touchdown run, increasing Kansas City's lead to 31–20 with 1:12 remaining and essentially putting the game away. Chiefs cornerback Kendall Fuller made an interception on the 49ers' following drive, allowing the Chiefs to run out the clock and secure their first Super Bowl victory in 50 years and second overall.

=== Postgame ===
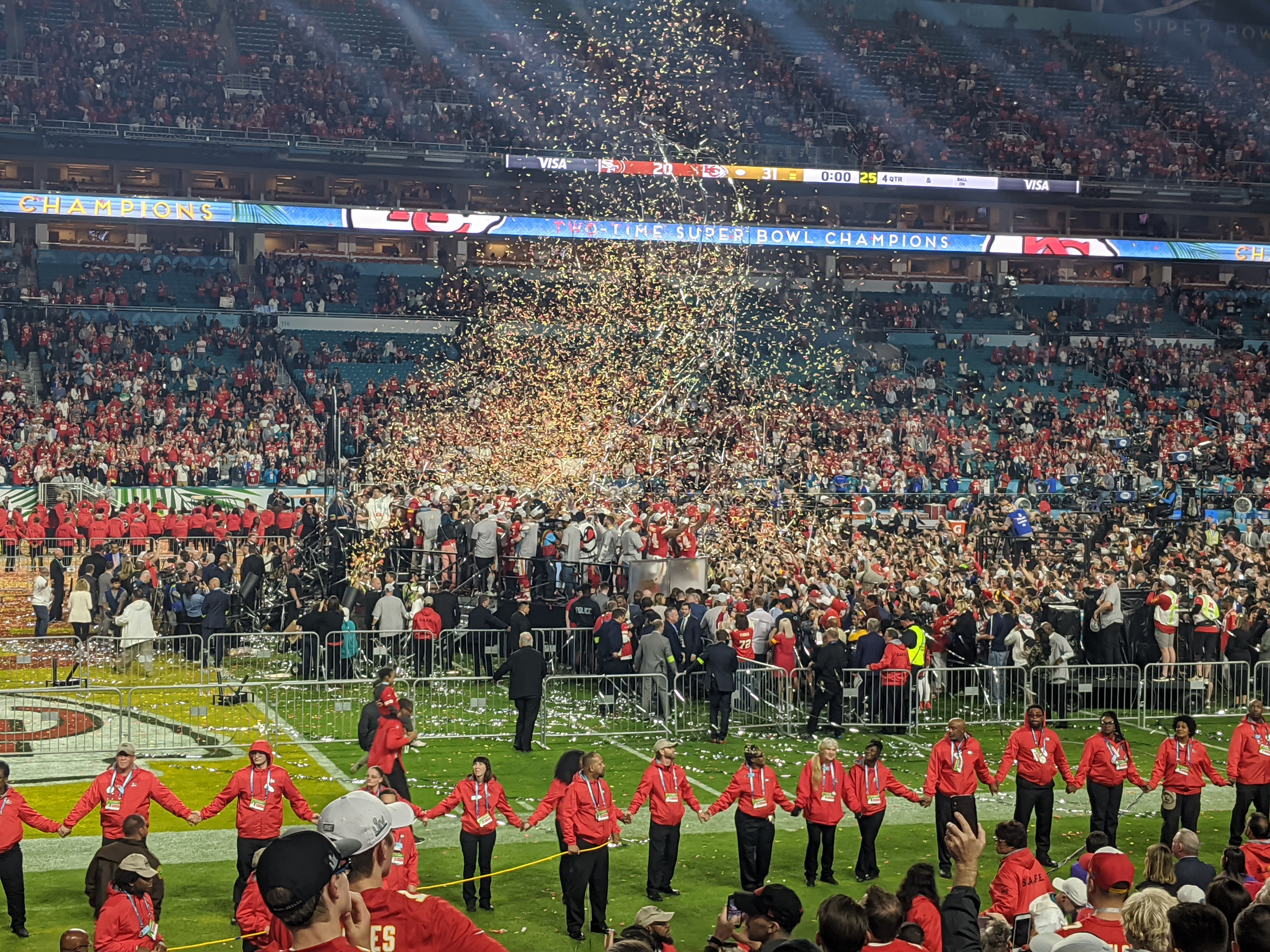
Trophy presentation after the game

Mahomes finished the game with 26 completions on 42 attempts for 286 yards, with two touchdowns and two interceptions, while also rushing for 29 yards and a touchdown, gaining him the Super Bowl Most Valuable Player Award (MVP). He joined Terry Bradshaw and Tom Brady as the only quarterbacks to win the MVP despite throwing multiple interceptions. Mahomes was the youngest player ever to win the award at 24 years and 138 days. He is also the third African American quarterback to win a Super Bowl, after Doug Williams in Super Bowl XXII and Russell Wilson in Super Bowl XLVIII.

Other notable statistical performances included Hill's nine receptions for 105 yards and Watkins' five catches for 98 yards. Williams was the top rusher of the game with 17 carries for 104 yards and a touchdown, while also catching four passes for 29 yards and another score. For San Francisco, Garoppolo completed 20 of 31 passes for 219 yards and a touchdown, with two interceptions. Samuel had three carries for 53 yards, setting the Super Bowl record for rushing yards by a wide receiver, and caught five passes for 39 yards.

With this win, Kansas City became the first NFL team to come back from a 10-point (or more) deficit in three playoff games in the same season. The Chiefs Super Bowl win also completed a ten-year stretch in which each current Missouri-based team in the four major American sports leagues won a title (joining the St. Louis Cardinals, who won the 2011 World Series; the Kansas City Royals, who won the 2015 World Series; and the St. Louis Blues, who won the 2019 Stanley Cup Finals). In addition, Sporting Kansas City, Kansas City's Major League Soccer franchise, won the MLS Cup in 2013.

=== Box score ===
San Francisco 49ers vs. Kansas City Chiefs—Game summary

Quarter	1	2	3	4	Total
49ers (NFC)	3	7	10	0	20
Chiefs (AFC)	7	3	0	21	31

at Hard Rock Stadium, Miami Gardens, Florida

- Date: February 2, 2020
- Game time: 6:41 p.m. EST
- Game weather: 64 °F (18 °C)
- Game attendance: 62,417
- Referee: Bill Vinovich (52)
- TV announcers (Fox): Joe Buck, Troy Aikman, Erin Andrews, Chris Myers and Mike Pereira
- Recap, Game Book

Scoring summary

Quarter	Time	Drive			Team	Scoring information	Score	
Quarter	Time	Plays	Yards	TOP	Team	Scoring information	SF	KC
1	7:57	10	62	5:58	SF	38-yard field goal by Robbie Gould	3	0
1	0:31	15	75	7:26	KC	Patrick Mahomes 1-yard touchdown run, Harrison Butker kick good	3	7
2	9:32	9	43	4:36	KC	31-yard field goal by Butker	3	10
2	5:05	7	80	4:27	SF	Kyle Juszczyk 15-yard touchdown reception from Jimmy Garoppolo, Gould kick good	10	10
3	9:29	9	60	5:31	SF	42-yard field goal by Gould	13	10
3	2:35	6	55	2:48	SF	Raheem Mostert 1-yard touchdown run, Gould kick good	20	10
4	6:13	10	83	2:40	KC	Travis Kelce 1-yard touchdown reception from Mahomes, Butker kick good	20	17
4	2:44	7	65	2:26	KC	Damien Williams 5-yard touchdown reception from Mahomes, Butker kick good	20	24
4	1:12	2	42	0:13	KC	Williams 38-yard touchdown run, Butker kick good	20	31
"TOP" = time of possession. For other American football terms, see Glossary of American football.							20	31

== Final statistics ==
=== Statistical comparison ===
Team-to-team comparison
Statistic	San Francisco 49ers	Kansas City Chiefs
First downs	21	26
First downs rushing	8	12
First downs passing	13	13
First downs penalty	0	1
Third down efficiency	3/8	6/14
Fourth down efficiency	0/1	2/3
Total net yards	351	397
Net yards rushing	141	129
Rushing attempts	22	29
Yards per rush	6.4	4.4
Yards passing	210	286
Passing–completions/attempts	20/31	26/42
Times sacked–total yards	1–9	4–18
Interceptions thrown	2	2
Punt returns–total yards	1–0	0–0
Kickoff returns–total yards	4–61	3–58
Interceptions–total return yards	2–10	2–11
Punts–average yardage	2–43	2–40
Fumbles–lost	1–0	3–0
Penalties–yards	5–45	4–24
Time of possession	26:47	33:13
Turnovers	2	2

Records set
(Unless noted as "NFL Championships", all records refer only to Super Bowls)
Most rushing yards, wide receiver	53	Deebo Samuel (San Francisco)
Records tied
Most touchdowns, quarter, player	2	Damien Williams (Kansas City)
Most points, 4th quarter, team	21	Kansas City Chiefs
Most fourth-down conversions, game, team	2	Kansas City Chiefs
Fewest punts returned, game, team	0	Kansas City Chiefs
Fewest punts return yards, game, both teams	0	Super Bowl LIV
Fewest fumbles lost, game, both teams	0	Super Bowl LIV

=== Individual statistics ===
San Francisco statistics
49ers passing
Player	C/Att^{1}	Yds	TD	INT	Rating
Jimmy Garoppolo	20/31	219	1	2	69.2
49ers rushing
Player	Car^{2}	Yds	TD	Lg^{3}	Yds/Car
Raheem Mostert	12	58	1	17	4.8
Deebo Samuel	3	53	0	32	17.7
Tevin Coleman	5	28	0	17	5.6
Jimmy Garoppolo	2	2	0	3	1
49ers receiving
Player	Rec^{4}	Yds	TD	Lg^{3}	Target^{5}
Deebo Samuel	5	39	0	16	9
George Kittle	4	36	0	12	7
Kyle Juszczyk	3	39	1	15	3
Emmanuel Sanders	3	38	0	18	5
Kendrick Bourne	2	42	0	26	4
Jeff Wilson	1	20	0	20	1
Tevin Coleman	1	3	0	3	1
Raheem Mostert	1	2	0	2	1

Kansas City statistics
Chiefs passing
Player	C/Att^{1}	Yds	TD	INT	Rating
Patrick Mahomes	26/42	286	2	2	78.1
Chiefs rushing
Player	Car^{2}	Yds	TD	Lg^{3}	Yds/Car
Damien Williams	17	104	1	38	6.1
Patrick Mahomes	9	29	1	13	3.2
Travis Kelce	1	2	0	2	2
Darwin Thompson	1	0	0	0	0
Mecole Hardman	1	−6	0	−6	−6
Chiefs receiving
Player	Rec^{4}	Yds	TD	Lg^{3}	Target^{5}
Tyreek Hill	9	105	0	44	16
Travis Kelce	6	43	1	11	6
Sammy Watkins	5	98	0	38	6
Damien Williams	4	29	1	13	8
Blake Bell	1	9	0	9	1
Mecole Hardman	1	2	0	2	1
Darwin Thompson	0	0	0	0	1

^{1}Completions/attempts
^{2}Carries
^{3}Long gain
^{4}Receptions
^{5}Times targeted

== Starting lineups ==
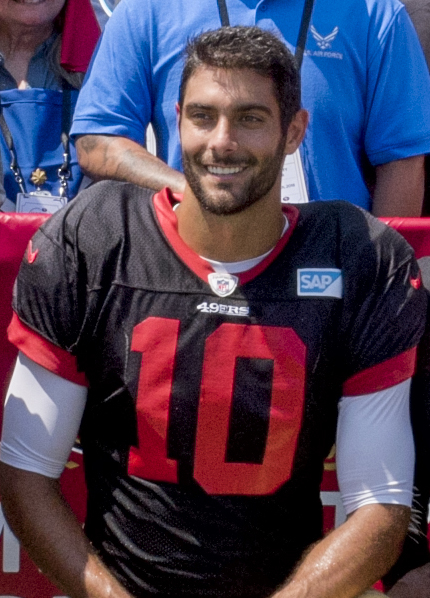
49ers starting quarterback Jimmy Garoppolo

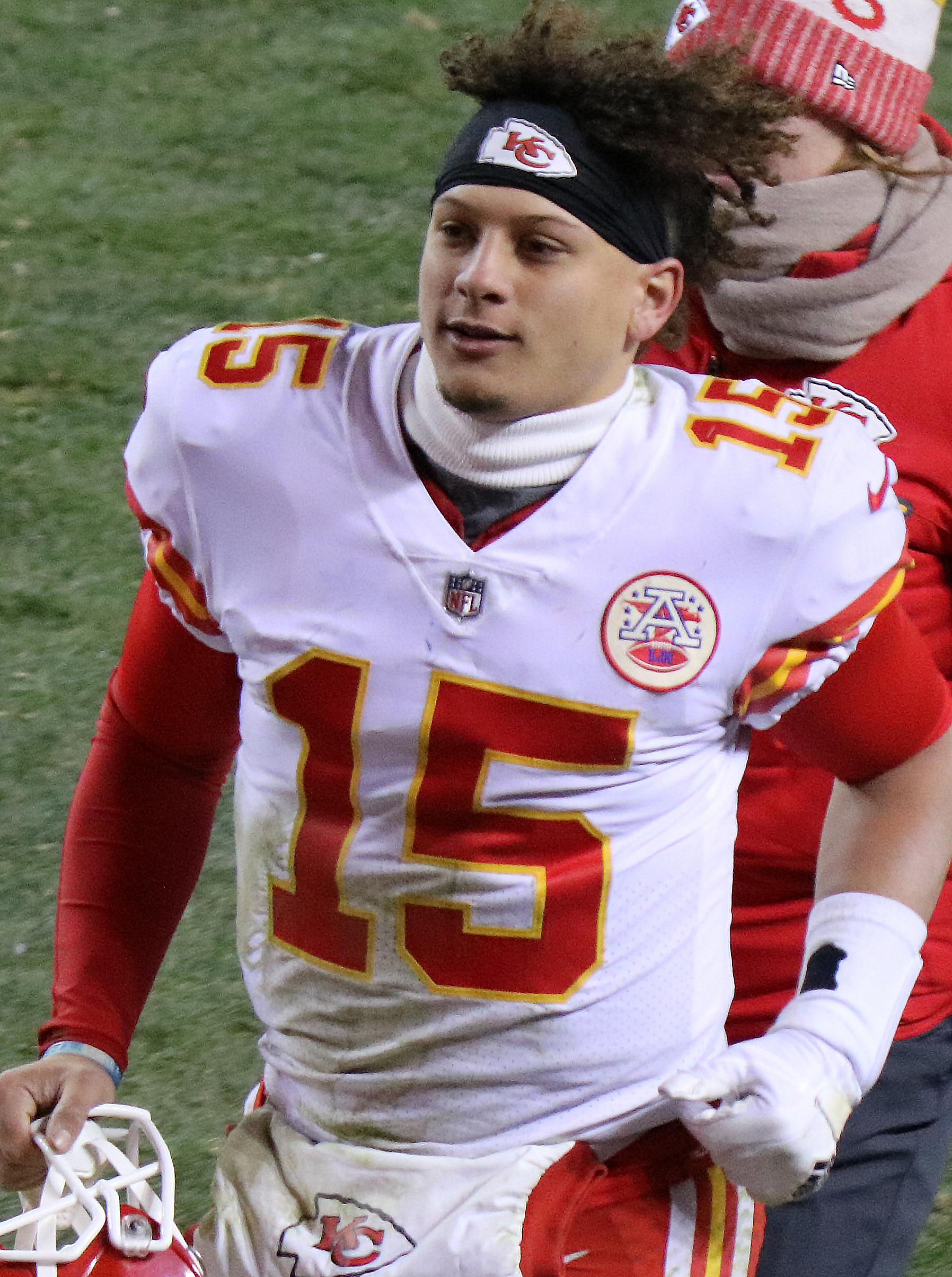
Chiefs starting quarterback Patrick Mahomes

Starting lineups for Super Bowl LIV
San Francisco	Position		Kansas City
Offense
Deebo Samuel	WR		Tyreek Hill
Joe Staley	LT		Eric Fisher
Laken Tomlinson	LG		Stefen Wisniewski
Ben Garland	C		Austin Reiter
Mike Person	RG		Laurent Duvernay-Tardif
Mike McGlinchey	RT		Mitchell Schwartz
George Kittle	TE		Travis Kelce
Emmanuel Sanders	WR		Sammy Watkins
Jimmy Garoppolo	QB		Patrick Mahomes
Tevin Coleman	RB		Damien Williams
Kyle Juszczyk	FB	WR	Mecole Hardman
Defense
Nick Bosa	LDE		Tanoh Kpassagnon
Sheldon Day	LDT		Chris Jones
DeForest Buckner	RDT		Derrick Nnadi
Arik Armstead	RDE		Frank Clark
Fred Warner	MIKE	LB	Anthony Hitchens
Dre Greenlaw	WILL	LB	Damien Wilson
Richard Sherman	LCB	LB	Reggie Ragland
Emmanuel Moseley	RCB	LCB	Charvarius Ward
K'Waun Williams	NB	RCB	Bashaud Breeland
Jimmie Ward	FS		Daniel Sorensen
Jaquiski Tartt	SS		Tyrann Mathieu

== Officials ==
Super Bowl LIV had seven officials. The numbers in parentheses below indicate their uniform numbers.

- Referee: Bill Vinovich (52)
- Umpire: Barry Anderson (20)
- Down judge: Kent Payne (79)
- Line judge: Carl Johnson (101)
- Field judge: Michael Banks (72)
- Side judge: Boris Cheek (41)
- Back judge: Greg Steed (12)
- Replay official: Mike Chase
- Replay assistant: Marv LeBlanc
- Alternates:
  - Referee: John Hussey (35)
  - Umpire: Bryan Neale (11)
  - Short wing: Tom Stephan (68)
  - Deep wing: Jimmy Buchanan (86)
  - Back judge: Greg Wilson (119)

== Aftermath ==
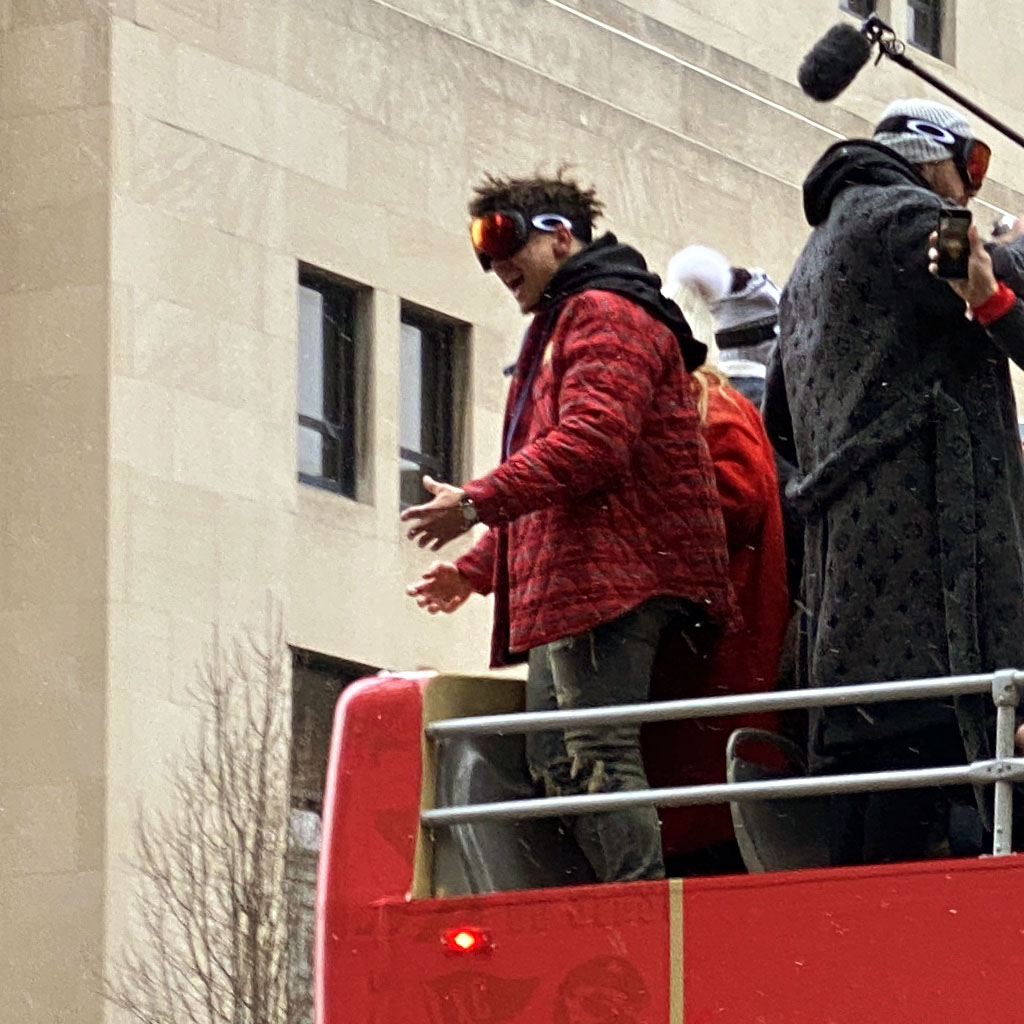
Patrick Mahomes at the 2020 Chiefs' victory parade

The Chiefs finished with a 14–2 record in the 2020 season. They won the AFC West and returned to the Super Bowl in the following season, losing 31–9 to the Tampa Bay Buccaneers in Super Bowl LV in a failed attempt to repeat. The 49ers failed to return to the postseason with a 6–10 record and last place finish in the NFC West.

The 49ers and the Chiefs would meet again in Super Bowl LVIII four years later in 2024, with the Chiefs again defeating the 49ers in overtime, 25–22. Coincidentally, Bill Vinovich was the referee for that game. The Super Bowl LVIII win was the Chiefs third Super Bowl in five years; in between, they defeated the Philadelphia Eagles in Super Bowl LVII the year before. In 2025, the Chiefs had a chance at being the first team in the Super Bowl-era to win three consecutive Super Bowls, but they were defeated in Super Bowl LIX by the Philadelphia Eagles (in a Super Bowl LVII rematch).

This was also the final Super Bowl that Joe Buck would announce for eight years; he had announced six Super Bowls for Fox. In 2022, he and Troy Aikman moved to ESPN. Fox had planned to team Daryl Johnston with former number-two play-by-play announcer Kevin Burkhardt upon Burkhardt's promotion to lead announcer; however Johnston left for the United Football League. Both Aikman and Johnston would be replaced with Tom Brady; Burkhardt and Brady's first Super Bowl together was the next Super Bowl the Chiefs would win in 2022. Buck and Aikman did not call another Super Bowl until Super Bowl LXI in 2027, the first-ever Super Bowl simulcast for ABC and ESPN.
