= Jet Chip Wasp =

Notable American football play in Super Bowl LIV

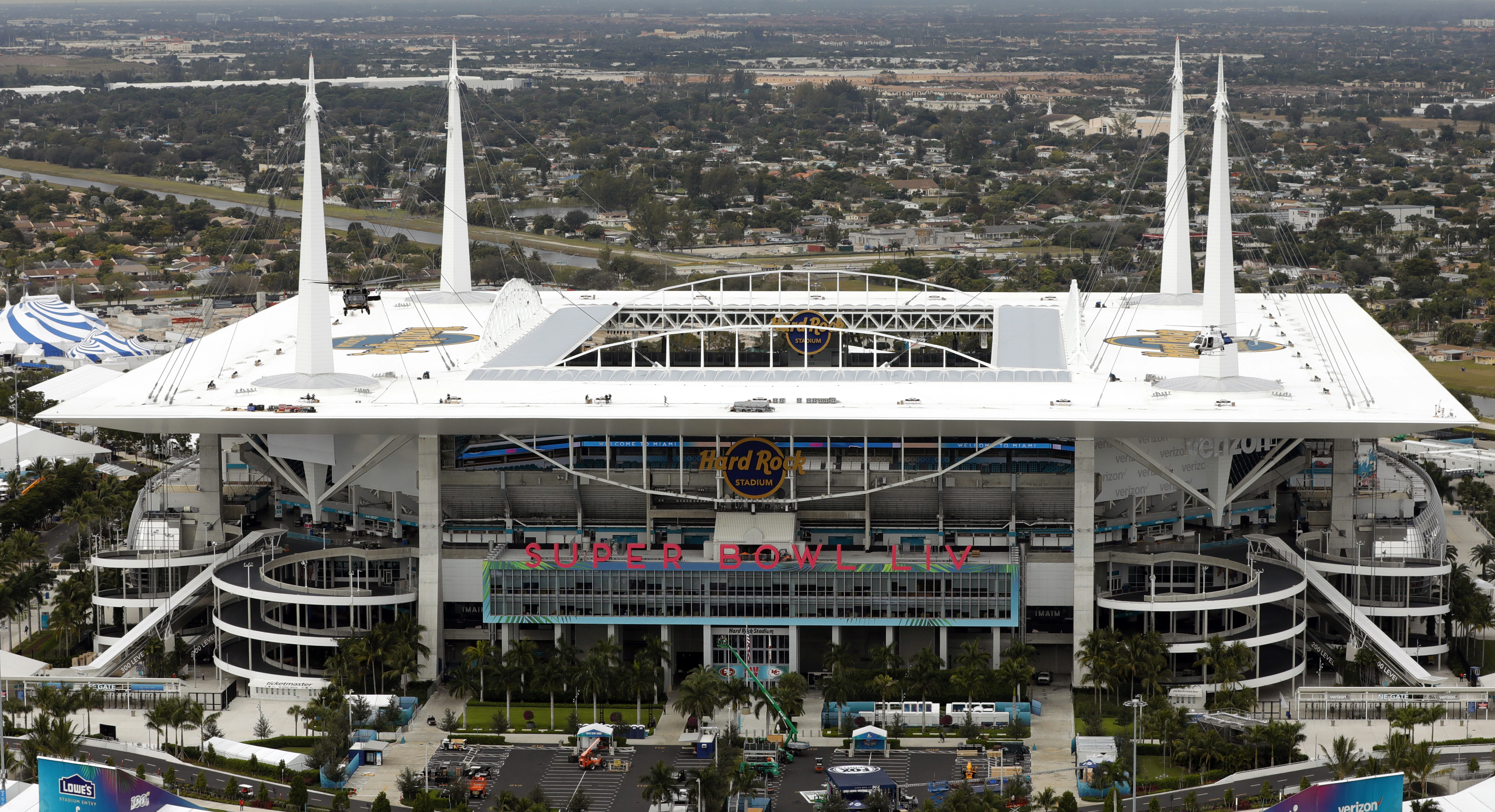
- Hard Rock Stadium decorated for Super Bowl LIV.
San Francisco 49ers (1) (NFC) (13–3)	Kansas City Chiefs (2) (AFC) (12–4)
20	31
Head coach: Kyle Shanahan	Head coach: Andy Reid
	1	2	3	4	Total
SF	3	7	10	0	20
KC	7	3	0	21	31
- Date: February 2, 2020
- Stadium: Hard Rock Stadium; Miami Gardens, Florida
- Favorite: Chiefs by 1.5
- Referee: Bill Vinovich
- Attendance: 62,417

TV in the United States
- Network: Fox
- Announcers: Joe Buck (play-by-play); Troy Aikman (color commentator); Erin Andrews and Chris Myers (sideline reporters); Mike Pereira (rules analyst)

Jet Chip Wasp (also referred to as 2-3 Jet Chip Wasp) was an American football play between Kansas City Chiefs players Patrick Mahomes and Tyreek Hill against the San Francisco 49ers on third-down-and-15 midway through the fourth quarter of Super Bowl LIV on February 2, 2020. The play helped begin the Chiefs' comeback, which ultimately led to the team winning their first Super Bowl in 50 years.

== Super Bowl LIV game action prior to the play ==
After entering halftime with a 10–10 tie, the 49ers took the second half kickoff and drove 60 yards in nine plays, with Emmanuel Sanders catching two passes for 20 yards, Deebo Samuel rushing for 14 yards and Kyle Juszczyk hauling in a 14-yard reception. Kicker Robbie Gould finished the drive with a 42-yard field goal, giving the 49ers a 13–10 lead. Linebacker Fred Warner intercepted Mahomes on the next drive, returning it three yards to the 49ers' 45-yard line. 49ers quarterback Jimmy Garoppolo started the ensuing drive with a 16-yard pass to Samuel. Three plays later, on 3rd-and-8, he threw a 26-yard pass to receiver Kendrick Bourne and then followed it up with a 10-yard pass to Juszczyk on the Chiefs' 1-yard line. Raheem Mostert ran the ball into the end zone on the next play, increasing the 49ers' lead to 20–10 with 2:35 left in the third quarter.

On the Chiefs' next drive, they drove the ball to the 49ers' 23-yard line. On a 3rd-and-6, Mahomes threw an intercepted pass intended for Tyreek Hill that was slightly behind the receiver. Hill tried to reach back for it, but the ball bounced off his arm and was caught by 49ers cornerback Tarvarius Moore, who returned it seven yards to the 49ers' 20-yard line with 11:57 left in the game. After the Chiefs defense rallied to force a punt, the Chiefs got the ball back with 8:53 left in the game. After a successful challenge by the 49ers in overturning the call on a completed pass that would have secured a first down, the Chiefs faced 3rd-and-15 on their own 35-yard line.

== The play ==
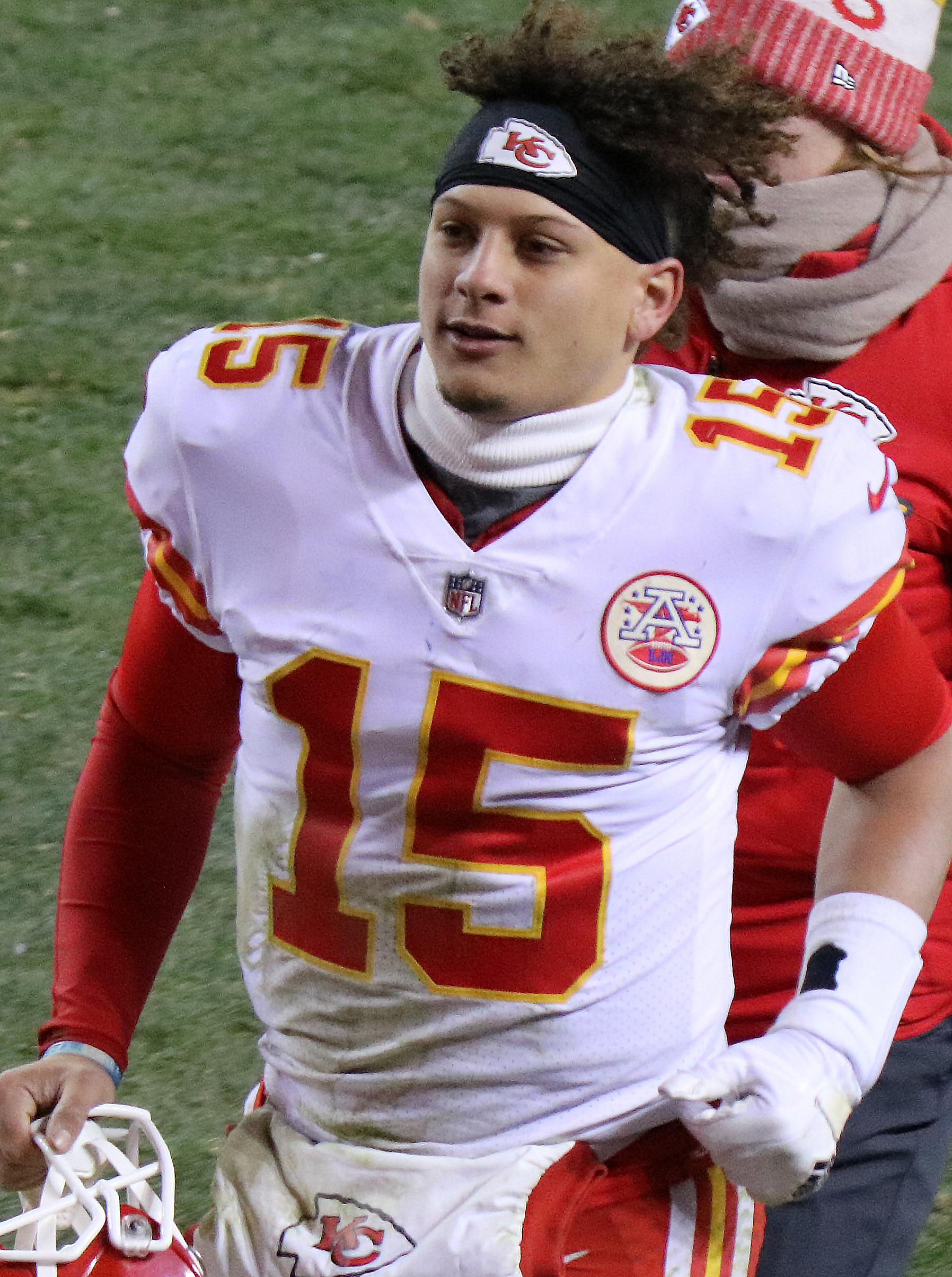
Mahomes in 2017.

In the pause while the previous play was being reviewed, Patrick Mahomes approached Chiefs offensive coordinator Eric Bieniemy and asked "Do we have time to run Wasp?" Bienemy responded "you like Wasp?" and spoke into his headset "He's asking for Wasp." He then asked Mahomes, "What down and distance do you like it?" Mahomes responded, "If it's first-and-10, Wasp, or I'll run it at any down and distance, I don't care."

The Chiefs had successfully run a similar play in the 2018 AFC Championship Game against the New England Patriots. In the play's design, the top 3 Chiefs receivers (Hill, Travis Kelce, and Sammy Watkins) are lined up on the same side of the field. Watkins is lined up on the outside and runs a deep square-in route. On the inside, Kelce runs a stutter-cross, and in the middle, Hill runs a 'wasp' route, in which he begins to run a deep crossing route, leading defenders towards the middle of the field before cutting sharply towards the sideline.

When the play was run again in Super Bowl LIV, it was defended by the 49ers using zone coverage. Cornerback Emmanuel Moseley was responsible for the outside deep third of the field where Hill cut towards, but cut forward to cover Watkins and lost track of Hill. Safety Jimmie Ward was covering the middle third of the field, but cut inwards in anticipation of the crossing route, leaving Hill open towards the sideline. Mahomes was pressured quickly by defensive tackle DeForest Buckner, causing the former to drop back 14 yards behind the line of scrimmage and release the ball without firmly planting and winding up. Mahomes was tackled by Buckner immediately after his release of the ball, but nevertheless was able to throw the ball 57.1 yards in the air (the longest air-distance of any of Mahomes' completions in the 2019 season) to successfully reach an open Hill.

== Broadcasting calls ==
=== Television ===
Joe Buck made the call with Troy Aikman for Fox. Before the play was called, Fox broadcaster Troy Aikman noted Mahomes' poor play in the game leading up to the play and the incompletion on the previous play: "He's not played well, Joe. He's missed some open guys, he's had interceptions as a result of it, and that should have been his easiest completion of the night." Buck's call of the play:

Instead it's 3rd and 15. Chiefs need some Mahomes Magic. Launches! Down the middle, Hill! Open! Caught! And they get it, Kansas City, the big play.

=== Radio ===
Chiefs broadcaster Mitch Holthus and Kendall Gammon broadcast the call for 101 The Fox, the team's flagship station. Holthus's call:

Third and 15 for the Chiefs from their own 35, and San Francisco leading by 10. 7:13 to go in the game. Chiefs just 4 of 11 on third-down conversions against this San Francisco defense. That was tied for second, only New England was better this year in the NFL. They back off. Seven guys back into a deep zone here for the 49ers. 4-man rush, those four are enough. Here they come. Mahomes, stepping up. He's throwing long downfield for Tyreek Hill! Got it! At the 20-yard line! And then spun down there, the first giant chunk of the game! On third down and 15, and Mahomes guns it for 44 yards, down to the San Francisco 21-yard line.

== Significance and aftermath ==
After the completion, the Chiefs were still down ten points with just over six minutes remaining. On each of their following three possessions, the Chiefs scored touchdowns while holding the 49ers scoreless throughout the remainder of the game, leading to a 31–20 victory for the Chiefs, their first Super Bowl victory in 50 years.

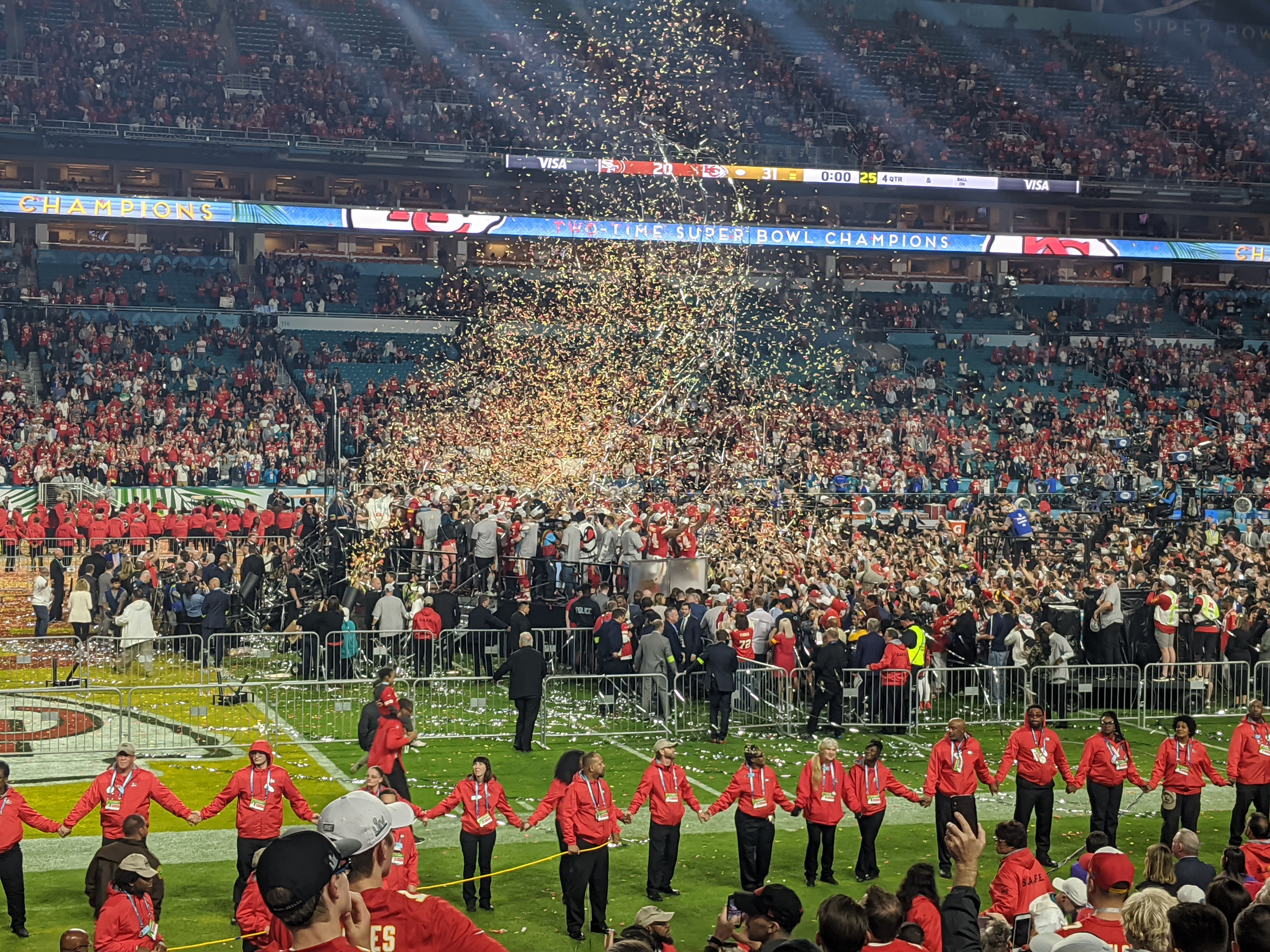
Vince Lombardi Trophy presentation at Super Bowl LIV.

Analysts, as well as the Chiefs players, described the Jet Chip Wasp as the turning point in the game. When asked about the momentum shift in his post-game interview, Mahomes referenced the play, saying "I think it was the third-and-15 when we hit Tyreek down the field." "We were in a bad situation, especially with that pass rush. You knew those guys had their ears pinned back and they were going to be rushing. I think the offensive line gave me enough time to throw a really deep route, and I just put it out there and Tyreek made a really great play and so that got us going there."

Kansas City Star reporter Vahe Gregorian described the significance of the play in changing the momentum of the game in favor of the Chiefs: "Seconds after defeat had appeared imminent, victory seemed almost inevitable. Abracadabra. It felt like magic. Or looked like fortune. But the intricate choreography, including the protection and a crucial decoy pattern by Sammy Watkins, reflected repetition after repetition at the very core of the fusion of Reid's creativity and Mahomes’ transcendent talents." According to Mahomes, "It kind of encompassed a lot of stuff that we had run the entire season."

This Super Bowl was considered by many to be the start of the Chiefs' dynasty through the early 2020s. The team subsequently appeared in Super Bowl LV at the end of the 2020 season, where they lost to the Tampa Bay Buccaneers. Kansas City came back to appear in three consecutive Super Bowls following an absence in 2021, winning Super Bowl LVII over the Philadelphia Eagles at the end of the 2022 season and Super Bowl LVIII in a rematch against the 49ers at the end of the 2023 season, before losing Super Bowl LIX in a rematch with the Eagles at the end of the 2024 season, marking five Super Bowl appearances and three wins in a six-year span.

The play quickly became remembered as one of the signature plays of Chiefs history and of the 2019 NFL season, drawing comparisons among journalists with "65 Toss Power Trap", the Chiefs' touchdown-scoring play in Super Bowl IV. In the NFL's official list of the top 100 plays of the 2019 season, Jet Chip Wasp was named as the top play overall. After the Chiefs victory, the play was added to the usable playbook of Madden NFL 20. References to the name and design of Jet Chip Wasp quickly became a popular inspiration among Chiefs fans for merchandise, artwork, and other commemorations.
