= Mecole Hardman =

American football player (born 1998)

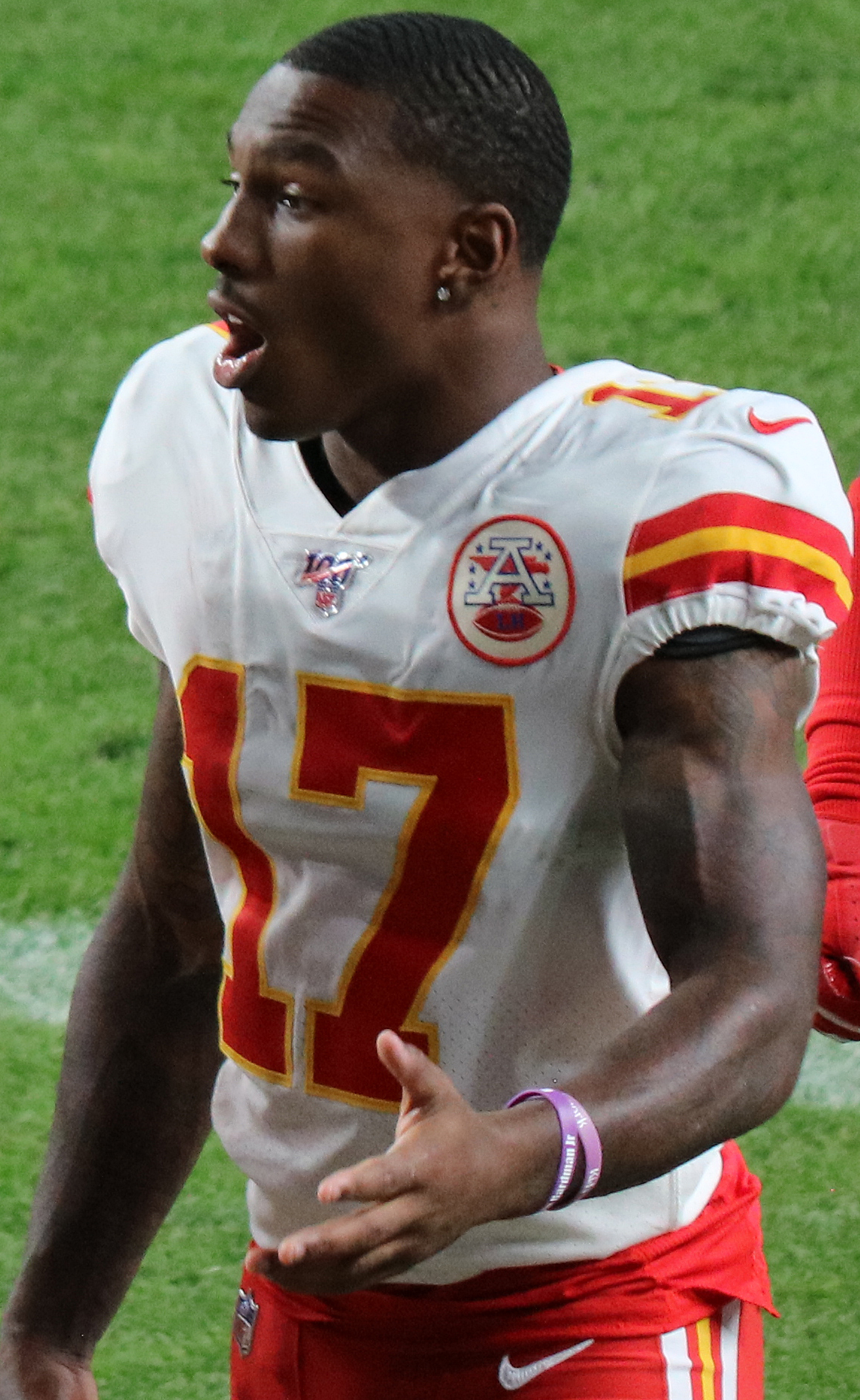
- Hardman with the Kansas City Chiefs in 2019

No. 11 – Indianapolis Colts
- Position: Wide receiver
- Roster status: Practice squad

Personal information
- Born: March 12, 1998 (age 28); Bowman, Georgia, U.S.
- Listed height: 5 ft 10 in (1.78 m)
- Listed weight: 187 lb (85 kg)

Career information
- High school: Elbert County (Elberton, Georgia)
- College: Georgia (2016–2018)
- NFL draft: 2019: 2nd round, 56th overall pick

Career history
- Kansas City Chiefs (2019–2022); New York Jets (2023); Kansas City Chiefs (2023–2024); Green Bay Packers (2025)*; Buffalo Bills (2025); Indianapolis Colts (2026–present)*
- * Offseason or practice squad member only

Awards and highlights
- 3× Super Bowl champion (LIV, LVII, LVIII); Second-team All-Pro (2019) (Note: Selected as a Kick Returner); Pro Bowl (2019); PFWA All-Rookie Team (2019); NCAA punt return yards leader (2018); 2× second-team All-SEC (2017, 2018)

Career NFL statistics as of 2026
- Receptions: 178
- Receiving yards: 2,302
- Receiving touchdowns: 16
- Rushing yards: 190
- Rushing touchdowns: 3
- Return yards: 1,957
- Return touchdowns: 2
- Stats at Pro Football Reference

Carey Mecole Hardman (born March 12, 1998) is an American professional football wide receiver and return specialist for the Indianapolis Colts of the National Football League (NFL). He played college football for the Georgia Bulldogs and was selected by the Kansas City Chiefs in the second round of the 2019 NFL draft, winning Super Bowl LIV, LVII, and LVIII with the team. In Super Bowl LVIII, Hardman scored the game-winning touchdown in overtime. He has also played for the New York Jets.

== Early life ==
Hardman attended Elbert County High School in Elbert County, Georgia. A five-star recruit, he committed to the University of Georgia to play college football.

== College career ==
Hardman played at Georgia from 2016 to 2018. During his career, he had 60 receptions for 961 yards and 11 touchdowns. As a return specialist, he had 39 punt returns for 592 yards and a touchdown and 35 kick returns for 875 yards. One significant touchdown came in his sophomore year against Alabama in the College Football Playoff National Championship. He caught an 80-yard pass from Jake Fromm in the third quarter of the 26–23 overtime loss. As a junior, he led the NCAA with 321 punt return yards. After the season, he decided to forgo his senior year and enter the 2019 NFL draft.

== Professional career ==
Pre-draft measurables
Height	Weight	Arm length	Hand span	Wingspan	40-yard dash	10-yard split	20-yard split	20-yard shuttle	Three-cone drill	Vertical jump	Broad jump	Bench press
5 ft 10 1/4 in (1.78 m)	187 lb (85 kg)	30 1/4 in (0.77 m)	9 in (0.23 m)	5 ft 11 5/8 in (1.82 m)	4.33 s	1.48 s	2.57 s	4.25 s	6.75 s	36.5 in (0.93 m)	9 ft 11 in (3.02 m)	17 reps
All values from NFL Combine/Pro Day

=== Kansas City Chiefs (first stint) ===
==== 2019 season ====
Hardman was selected by the Kansas City Chiefs in the second round with the 56th overall pick in the 2019 NFL draft. He was the fifth wide receiver selected that year.

During Week 2 against the Oakland Raiders, Hardman caught four passes for 61 yards and his first NFL touchdown in the 28–10 road victory. In the Week 3 game against the Baltimore Ravens, he caught two passes for 97 yards including an 83-yard receiving touchdown. The Chiefs defeated the Ravens 33–28. During a Week 10 35–32 road loss against the Tennessee Titans, Hardman had a 63-yard touchdown on his only reception of the game. On December 17, Hardman was named to the Pro Bowl. In the regular-season finale against the Los Angeles Chargers, Hardman caught a 30-yard reception and returned a kickoff for a 104-yard touchdown in the 31–21 win. He was named to the PFWA All-Rookie Team. In Super Bowl LIV, Hardman had a single reception for two yards while returning three kicks for a total of 58 yards in a 31–20 win against the San Francisco 49ers.

==== 2020 season ====
During a Week 3 game against the Ravens, Hardman caught four passes for 81 yards including a 49-yard touchdown; the Chiefs won 34–20. In a Week 8 35–9 victory against the New York Jets, Hardman caught seven passes for 96 yards including a 30-yard touchdown. On November 11, 2020, Hardman was placed on the reserve/COVID-19 list after testing positive for COVID-19, and was activated on November 21. Hardman missed no games while on the reserve/COVID-19 list, but his snaps were limited in the Chiefs' Week 11 victory against the Las Vegas Raiders. His only reception in the game came on the team's game-winning drive with 1:14 remaining in the fourth quarter. In the Chiefs' Week 14 victory over the Miami Dolphins, Hardman returned a punt 67 yards for a touchdown, the first punt return touchdown of his NFL career. Overall, Hardman recorded 41 receptions for 560 yards and four touchdowns to go along with a punt return touchdown in 2020.

In the AFC Championship against the Bills, Hardman muffed a punt return that the Bills recovered at the 3-yard line which was later converted into a touchdown. However, on the next Chiefs drive, Hardman caught a touchdown pass and later rushed for a 50-yard jet sweep. The Chiefs would win 38–24 advancing to Super Bowl LV. In the Super Bowl, Hardman caught two passes for four yards in a 31–9 loss to the Tampa Bay Buccaneers.

==== 2021 season ====
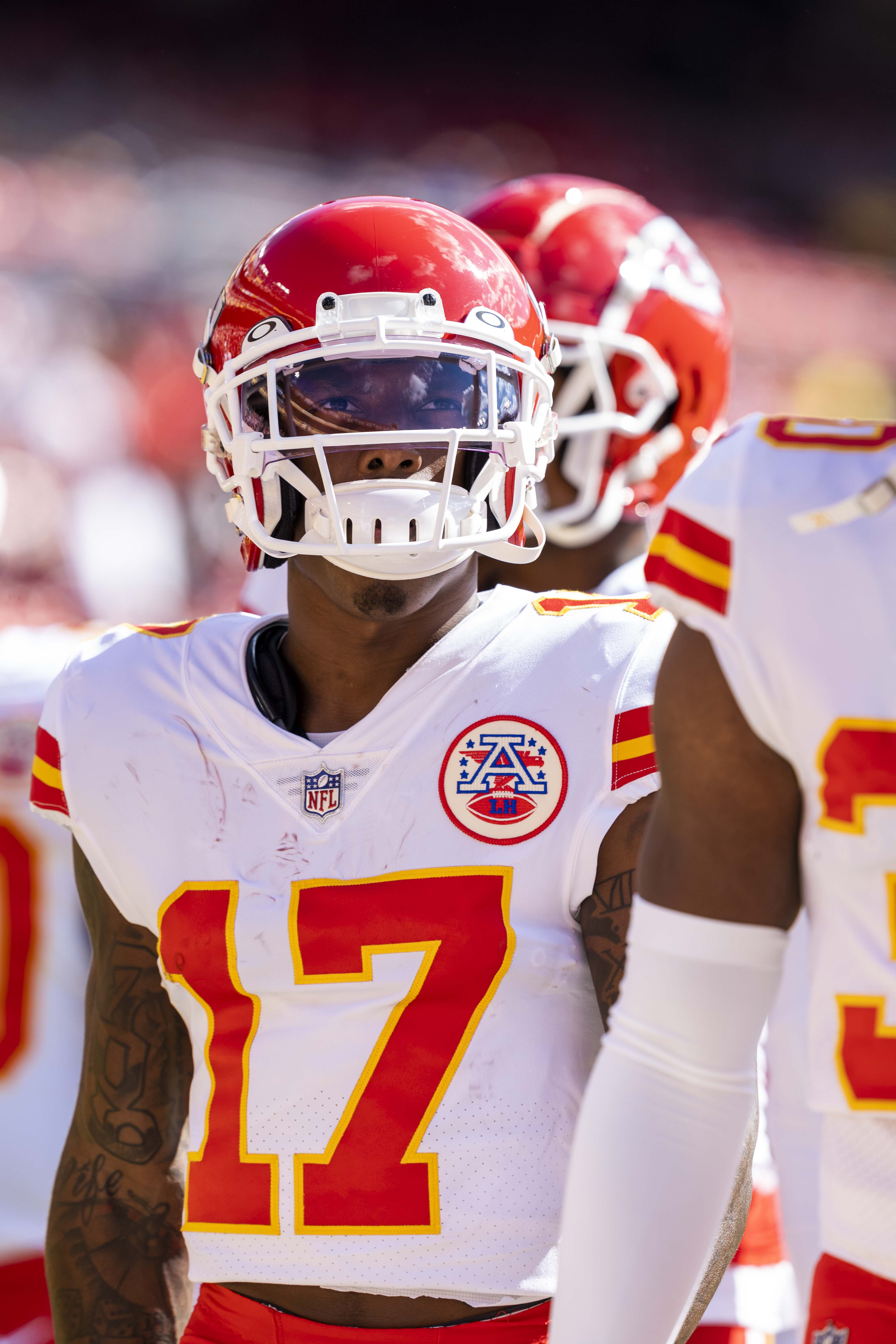
Hardman with the Chiefs in 2021

In the 2021 season, Hardman played in all 17 games and recorded 59 receptions for 693 yards and two touchdowns while handling a majority of the punt return duties. In the postseason, Hardman scored a rushing touchdown in the Divisional Round and a receiving touchdown in the AFC Championship.

==== 2022 season ====
In Week 7 against the San Francisco 49ers, Hardman recorded four catches for 32 yards and a receiving touchdown to go along with 28 rushing yards and two rushing touchdowns. He became the first wide receiver in the Super Bowl era to get two rushing touchdowns and a receiving touchdown in the same game. He was placed on injured reserve on November 17, 2022, after suffering an abdomen injury in Week 9. Hardman was activated off of injured reserve on January 4, 2023. Hardman did return in the AFC Championship but injured his abdominal and was deactivated for Super Bowl LVII. The Chiefs defeated the Philadelphia Eagles 38–35 to give Hardman his second Super Bowl win.

=== New York Jets ===
Hardman signed with the New York Jets on March 23, 2023. However, he only caught one pass in five games with the Jets and lost his starting spot to two rookie wide receivers before asking to be traded.

=== Kansas City Chiefs (second stint) ===
On October 18, 2023, the Jets traded Hardman and a seventh-round selection in the 2025 NFL draft to the Chiefs in exchange for a sixth-round selection in 2025, reuniting Hardman with his former team. In Super Bowl LVIII, Hardman caught the game-winning touchdown in overtime, sealing the Chiefs' 25–22 win over the 49ers and earning Hardman his third Super Bowl title.

In the ensuing offseason Hardman entered free-agency, and ultimately returned to the Chiefs for the 2024 season after signing a one-year, $1.125 million contract on June 7, 2024. On December 7, 2024, Hardman was placed on injured reserve due to a knee injury. Prior to his injury, Hardman totaled 90 yards on 12 receptions, 62 yards and one touchdown on five carries, and 335 return yards. He served as the team's primary punt returner. On January 22, 2025, four days before the Chiefs' AFC Championship Game matchup against the Buffalo Bills, head coach Andy Reid announced that Hardman would not return from injured reserve due to his knee injury and would miss the remainder of the season.

=== Green Bay Packers ===
On March 20, 2025, Hardman signed a one-year contract with the Green Bay Packers. He was released on August 26 as part of final roster cuts and re-signed to the practice squad the next day. Hardman was released on September 23.

=== Buffalo Bills ===
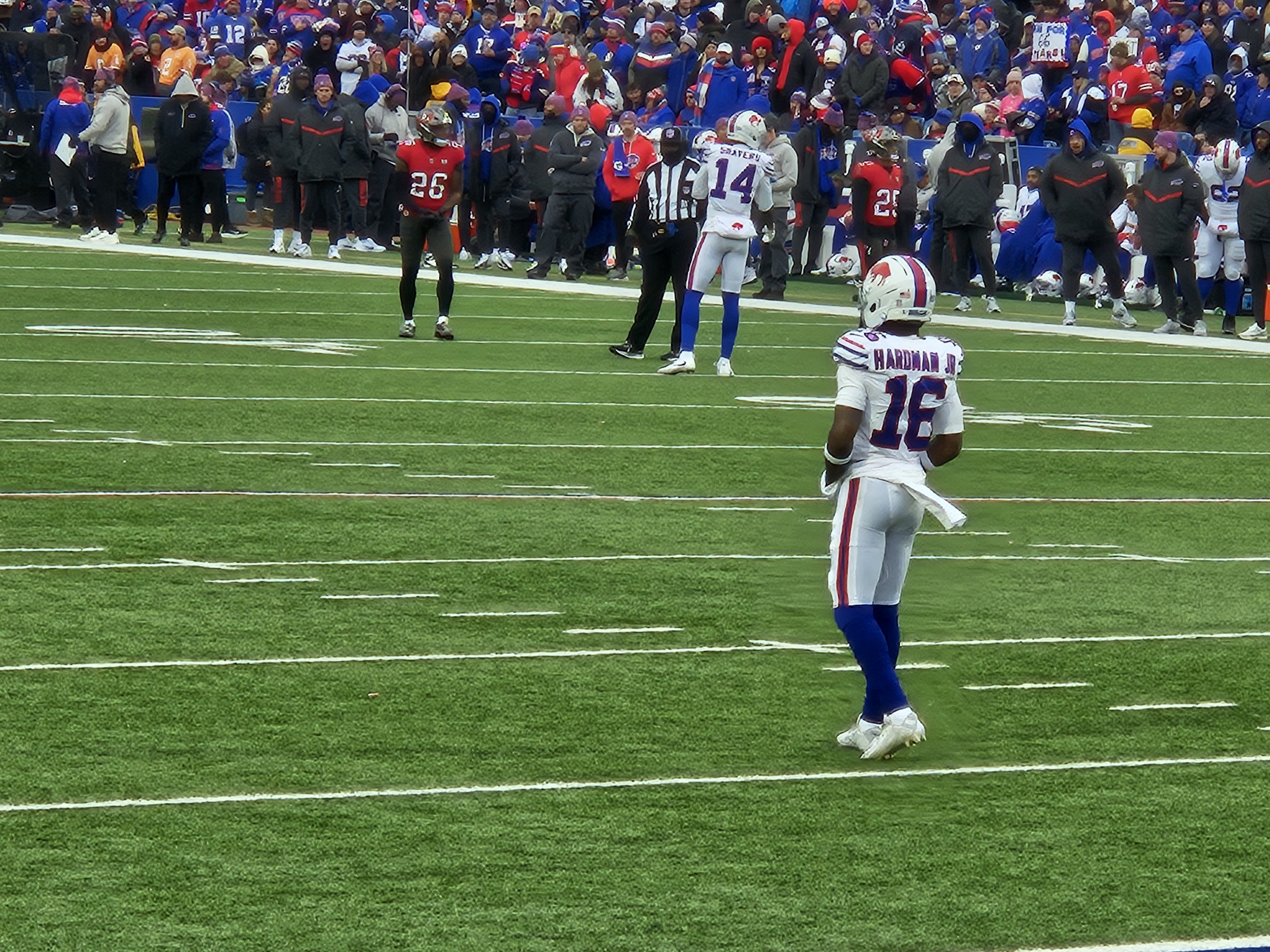
Hardman (#16) with the Bills against the Tampa Bay Buccaneers in 2025

On November 11, 2025, Hardman signed with the Buffalo Bills' practice squad. He was elevated to the active roster four days later, ahead of the team's Week 11 matchup against the Tampa Bay Buccaneers. In his debut, Hardman was assigned mostly to kick return duties, returning a kick 61 yards before fumbling a punt return in the third quarter while injuring his calf. The injury landed Hardman on the injured reserve. He was activated on December 20, but was subsequently released from the team on December 27. Hardman was re-signed to the practice squad on December 30. In the Bills' Divisional Round game against the Denver Broncos, Hardman scored the first touchdown of the game, catching a 4-yard pass from Josh Allen.

On January 19, 2026, Hardman signed a reserve/futures contract with Buffalo. On August 29, he was released by the Bills as a part of final roster cuts.

=== Indianapolis Colts ===
On October 20, Hardman was signed to the Indianapolis Colts practice squad.

== Career statistics ==
=== NFL ===
Legend
	Won the Super Bowl
**Bold**	Career best

==== Regular season ====
Year	Team	Games		Receiving					Rushing					Punt returns					Kick returns					Fumbles	
Year	Team	GP	GS	Rec	Yds	Avg	Lng	TD	Att	Yds	Avg	Lng	TD	Ret	Yds	Avg	Lng	TD	Ret	Yds	Avg	Lng	TD	Fum	Lost
2019	KC	16	5	26	538	**20.7**	**83**	**6**	4	17	4.3	9	0	18	167	9.3	36	0	**27**	**704**	26.1	**104**	**1**	2	2
2020	KC	16	8	41	560	13.7	49	4	4	31	7.8	20	0	**25**	176	7.0	**67**	**1**	9	184	20.4	31	0	2	2
2021	KC	17	8	**59**	**693**	11.7	53	2	**8**	**46**	5.8	24	0	13	157	**12.1**	31	0	2	35	17.5	20	0	3	2
2022	KC	8	5	25	297	11.9	36	4	4	31	7.8	**25**	**2**	6	55	9.2	22	0	1	4	4.0	4	0	1	**0**
2023	NYJ	5	0	1	6	6.0	6	0	0	0	0.0	0	0	-	-	-	-	0	-	-	-	-	0	**0**	**0**
2023	KC	6	2	14	118	8.4	37	0	1	3	3.0	3	0	7	61	8.7	50	0	1	14	14.0	14	0	1	1
2024	KC	12	0	12	90	7.5	17	0	5	62	**12.4**	20	1	20	**203**	10.2	55	0	5	132	26.4	32	0	0	**0**
2025	BUF	2	0	-	-	-	-	-	-	-	-	-	-	2	4	2.0	4	0	1	61	**61.0**	61	0	1	1
Career		82	28	178	2,302	12.9	83	16	26	190	7.3	25	3	91	823	9.0	67	1	46	1,134	24.7	104	1	10	8

==== Postseason ====
Year	Team	Games		Receiving					Rushing					Fumbles	
Year	Team	GP	GS	Rec	Yds	Avg	Lng	TD	Att	Yds	Avg	Lng	TD	Fum	Lost
2019	KC	3	1	4	29	7.3	13	0	1	−6	−6.0	−6	0	**0**	**0**
2020	KC	3	1	**8**	66	8.3	42	**1**	2	54	**27.0**	**50**	0	1	1
2021	KC	3	1	**8**	**121**	**15.1**	44	**1**	**6**	**55**	9.2	25	**1**	1	**0**
2022	KC	1	0	2	10	5.0	11	0	2	7	3.5	5	0	**0**	**0**
2023	KC	4	1	5	62	12.4	**52**	**1**	2	−5	−2.5	−1	0	2	1
2025	BUF	1	0	1	4	4.0	4	**1**	−	−	−	−	−	**0**	**0**
Career		15	4	28	292	10.4	52	4	13	105	8.1	50	1	4	2

=== College ===
Legend
	Led the NCAA
**Bold**	Career high

Season	Team	GP	Receiving				Rushing				Punt returns				Kick returns			
Season	Team	GP	Rec	Yds	Avg	TD	Att	Yds	Avg	TD	Ret	Yds	Avg	TD	Ret	Yds	Avg	TD
2016	Georgia	4	0	0	0.0	0	0	0	0.0	0	0	0	-	0	1	17	17.0	0
2017	Georgia	15	25	418	**16.7**	4	**8**	**61**	**7.6**	**2**	**23**	271	11.8	0	**20**	**505**	**25.3**	0
2018	Georgia	14	**35**	**543**	15.5	**7**	5	36	7.2	0	16	**321**	**20.1**	**1**	14	353	25.2	0
Career		33	60	961	16.0	11	13	97	7.5	2	39	592	15.2	1	35	875	25.0	0

== Personal life ==
Hardman is engaged to Chariah Gordon, who is the founder and owner of The Glo Collection. They have been dating since at least September 2021. The couple had their first child, Three, who was born the day of Super Bowl LVII on February 12, 2023. In 2024, the couple welcomed a baby girl.

He made a guest cameo as himself on 2024 Hallmark Channel original film, Holiday Touchdown: A Chiefs Love Story.
