= Mitch Holthus =

American sportscaster (born 1957)

- Holthus with the Vince Lombardi Trophy after Super Bowl LVIII
- Born: June 28, 1957 (age 69); Fort Lewis, Washington, U.S.
- Education: Kansas State University (BA)
- Occupation: Sportscaster
- Spouse: Tami Johnson
- Children: 2
- Sports commentary career
- Team(s): Kansas State Wildcats (1984–1996); Kansas City Chiefs (1994–present)
- Genre: Play-by-play
- Sport: Football

Mitchell G. Holthus (/ˈhoʊlθəs/; born June 28, 1957), is the play-by-play announcer for the Kansas City Chiefs Radio Network. Holthus is fondly nicknamed "the voice of the Chiefs", and he hosts various programs and events for the Chiefs organization's 65TPT production arm for broadcast as well as Chiefs Radio Network and the NFL team's YouTube channel. He was on call for Super Bowls LIV, LVII, and LVIII when the Chiefs won their second, third, and fourth NFL national championships in franchise history. Holthus also hosts the Chiefs Insider program, Defending the Kingdom podcast, Chiefs Rewind and is a contributor with the Chiefs Senior Team Reporter Matt McMullen on Chiefs Field Pass. He also hosts the award-winning "Minute With Mitch" television and radio series that is seen and heard in five states. At the start of the 2026 NFL season, Holthus will be going into his 33rd year as the voice of the Kansas City Chiefs.

== Early life ==
Holthus was born at Fort Lewis, Washington, while his father was in the U.S. Army, and grew up on the family farm near Smith Center, Kansas after his father left the Army. He began his broadcasting career while still in Smith Center High School, with his mentor Tad Felts for radio station KKAN in nearby Phillipsburg, Kansas. Holthus graduated with two separate degrees from Kansas State University with a Bachelors in Journalism and a Bachelors in Business Administration. He was named K-State Ambassador while a student there.

== Broadcast career ==
After graduating from K-State with his second undergraduate degree, Holthus worked in Pratt, KS for radio station KWLS. In 1983, he moved to WIBW radio and TV in Topeka, KS. There Holthus began a 13-year stint on the K-State Radio Network, as the "Voice of the K-State Wildcats." In addition, Holthus was very involved with marketing for both the Network and the K-State athletic department. He started the Jr. Wildcat Club in 1989 and was named K-State Catbacker of the Year in 1993. Holthus then became the "Voice of the Kansas City Chiefs" in 1994, making him the longest tenured play-by-play announcer in Chiefs history. Holthus also was a television basketball play-by-play announcer for 28 seasons, and his work was featured on the ESPN family of networks, FOX Regional Networks and other national outlets. He served the Missouri Valley Conference for 26 seasons as their main play-by-play announcer and was awarded the "John Sanders Spirit of the Valley" Award in 2007. Holthus is a past President of the National Sports Media Association and also served on its Board of Directors. Holthus is a five-time Emmy winner for his on camera and online work from Academy of Television Arts and Sciences.

== Personal life ==
He is married to the former Tami Johnson of McPherson, Kansas, a former Kansas State women's basketball player. They have two children. Holthus often sends a radio "shout out" to the Roxbury Fan Club, a greeting to members of his family that live near Roxbury, Kansas. Holthus is a Christian.

== Awards ==
- 8-time Kansas Sportscaster of the Year
- 9-time winner Kansas Broadcasters Association best play-by-play sportscast.
- 1996 "Hod Humiston Award of Excellence" in Kansas Sportscasting.
- 2007 awarded the "John Sanders Spirit of the Valley" by the Missouri Valley Conference.
- Kansas Association of Broadcasters Hall of Fame
- Missouri Broadcasters Association Hall of Fame
- Kansas State University Athletics Hall of Fame
- Kansas City Sports Journalist of the Year
- Listed with the Voice of the Royals Denny Matthews as one of the Top 13 "one-two" play-by-play pairs in America
- 2020 Missouri Sportscaster of the Year
- 2024 CityYear Idealist of the Year
- 2024 Kansan of the Year

== Chiefs Kingdom ==
Holthus was the originator of the catch phrase "Chiefs Kingdom" to describe the vast and passionate throng of fans who follow the Chiefs. The organization adopted the moniker in 2013 to strongly identify the ever increasing fan base and popularity surrounding the Kansas City Chiefs football team.

== Famous Phrases and Calls ==
Holthus is best known for his call whenever the Chiefs score a touchdown, "Touchdown, KAN-SAHS CITY!" He is also known to start the 4th quarter of every Chiefs game with his broadcast analyst Danan Hughes and sideline reporter Josh Klinger by proclaiming "ITS TIME TO PUT THE HAMMER DOWN!" Holthus also will reference a touchdown by the Chiefs as "tasting the sweet nectar of the end zone." Holthus also honored the courage and toughness of the 2022 Chiefs World Championship team several times by shouting "grab a bucket of guts." Also in 2022, he stated at the end of the AFC Championship victory over the Cincinnati Bengals, "You can doubt the Chiefs, you can dislike the Chiefs, you can disrespect the Chiefs. But you're going to have to deal with the Chiefs." He would say the line again at the conclusion of the 2024 AFC Championship game against the rival Buffalo Bills. At the end of Super Bowl LIV, Holthus said "The Chiefs Kingdom has firmly planted its flag on top of football's highest summit. The Kansas City Chiefs are champions of Super Bowl 54!" At the conclusion of Super Bowl LVII, Holthus stated "For the second time in four seasons, the Lombardi Trophy has a Red and Gold reflection, a Big Red reflection, the Chiefs are champions of Super Bowl 57!" Following the Super Bowl 58 victory over San Francisco Holthus exclaimed, "For the first time in 6,944 days there is a back-to-back Super Bowl Champion and its the KAN-ZAZZ City Chiefs - championships of Super Bowl 58 on the heels of Super Bowl 57!"

While at Kansas State he would end every big victory with a "It's a big, big, big, big, big, Wildcat Victory!".
