= Bills–Chiefs rivalry =

NFL rivalry

- Buffalo Bills Kansas City Chiefs
- Location: Buffalo, Kansas City
- First meeting: November 6, 1960; Texans 45, Bills 28
- Latest meeting: November 2, 2025; Bills 28, Chiefs 21
- Next meeting: November 26, 2026
- Stadiums: Bills: Highmark Stadium; Chiefs: Arrowhead Stadium

Statistics
- Total meetings: 58
- All-time series: Bills: 31–26–1
- Regular season series: Bills: 29–21–1
- Postseason results: Chiefs: 5–2
- Largest victory: Bills: 44–10 (1994), 41–7 (2011); Chiefs: 38–5 (2003)
- Most points scored: Bills: 54 (2008); Chiefs: 45 (1960)
- Longest win streak: Bills: 5 (1963–1965); Chiefs: 6 (1967–1971)
- Current win streak: Bills: 1 (2025–present)

Post–season history
- 1966 AFL Championship: Chiefs won: 31–7; 1991 AFC Divisional: Bills won: 37–14; 1993 AFC Championship: Bills won: 30–13; 2020 AFC Championship: Chiefs won: 38–24; 2021 AFC Divisional: Chiefs won: 42–36 (OT); 2023 AFC Divisional: Chiefs won: 27–24; 2024 AFC Championship: Chiefs won: 32–29

The Bills–Chiefs rivalry is a National Football League (NFL) rivalry between the Buffalo Bills and Kansas City Chiefs.

The series originated during the American Football League's inaugural season in 1960, as both the Chiefs, then known as the Dallas Texans, and Bills were charter teams in the league. Because they play in different intraconference divisions, the Bills in the AFC East and the Chiefs in the AFC West, they do not play each other every year. Instead, based on the NFL's scheduling formula, the two teams play each other at least once every three seasons and at least once every six seasons at each team's home stadium when their divisions are paired up, sometimes more often if the two teams meet in the playoffs or they finish in the same place in their respective divisions.

Nonetheless, the Bills and Chiefs have had many notable moments in NFL postseason history, including the 1966 AFL Championship preceding the first-ever Super Bowl, and the 2021 AFC Divisional playoff game, which is often nicknamed "13 Seconds". Buffalo is one of 4 teams in the AFC with a winning overall record against Kansas City (the others being the Cincinnati Bengals, Indianapolis Colts, and Pittsburgh Steelers).

Since 2020, the rivalry has redeveloped as both teams consistently contended for the AFC title. A rivalry has also developed between Bills quarterback Josh Allen and Chiefs quarterback Patrick Mahomes. The rivalry in the Mahomes–Allen era has largely been defined by the Bills' success in the regular season with the Chiefs owning the teams' playoff matchups, as the Bills are currently 5–1 in the regular season but the Chiefs lead the series in the playoffs with a 4–0 record.

The Bills lead the overall series, 31–26–1. The two teams have met seven times in the playoffs, with the Chiefs holding a 5–2 record.

== History ==
=== 1960–1969: The AFL days ===
The teams first met in 1960 when the Chiefs were known as the Dallas Texans. The Texans beat the Bills 45–28, the teams first game at Buffalo.

The two teams met for their first playoff match in the 1966 AFL Championship Game on January 1, 1967. This game was notable where the game would determine the AFL's representative in the first Super Bowl. Kansas City would defeat Buffalo, 31–7, allowing the Chiefs to face the Green Bay Packers.

The teams would face each other 19 times before the AFL–NFL merger. The teams would have a tied record of 9–9–1 in the AFL with the only tie in the rivalry occurring on September 22, 1963, with the score tied 27–27.

=== 1991–2000: Resurgence of the rivalry ===
In 1991, both teams met in the regular season at Arrowhead Stadium where the Chiefs would defeat the then-defending AFC champion Bills by a score of 33–6. Chiefs running back Christian Okoye ran for 122 yards and rushed for 2 touchdowns on the ground. The Bills were limited to only 211 net yards in the game, and had lost five fumbles.

The teams would meet again in the 1991 AFC Divisional Round at Rich Stadium, where the Bills would get their revenge on Kansas City. Buffalo led 17–0 at halftime on route to a 37–14 victory. Bills quarterback Jim Kelly would throw for 373 yards passing with 3 touchdowns, while running back Thurman Thomas rushed for 100 yards on 22 carries. With the win, the Bills would advance to the AFC Championship Game for the second straight season, where they would defeat the Denver Broncos by a score of 10–7, allowing the Bills to reach the Super Bowl for the second straight year.

Prior to the 1993 season, the Chiefs acquired quarterback Joe Montana from the San Francisco 49ers and also signed running back Marcus Allen, both former Super Bowl MVPs. These moves helped build Kansas City into potential Super Bowl favorite, with the potential to challenge the Bills for supremacy in the AFC.

The Bills and Chiefs met in the regular season in 1993, with Kansas City defeating Buffalo 23–7. Despite the Bills jumping out to an early 7–0 lead in the first quarter, Jim Kelly would throw three interceptions, with the turnovers effectively costing the Bills the game. Joe Montana, returning to the Chiefs' lineup after a missing a month due to an injury, would throw for two passing touchdowns in the victory.

The two teams met again in that year's AFC Championship Game where the Bills won their fourth straight AFC Championship by a score of 30–13. Montana would suffer a concussion on a three-way sack from Bruce Smith, Phil Hansen, and Jeff Wright, early in the third quarter, which forced Chiefs backup quarterback Dave Krieg into the game. Bills running back Thurman Thomas rushed for 186 yards and added three touchdowns.

=== 2002–2017: Bills' playoff drought ===
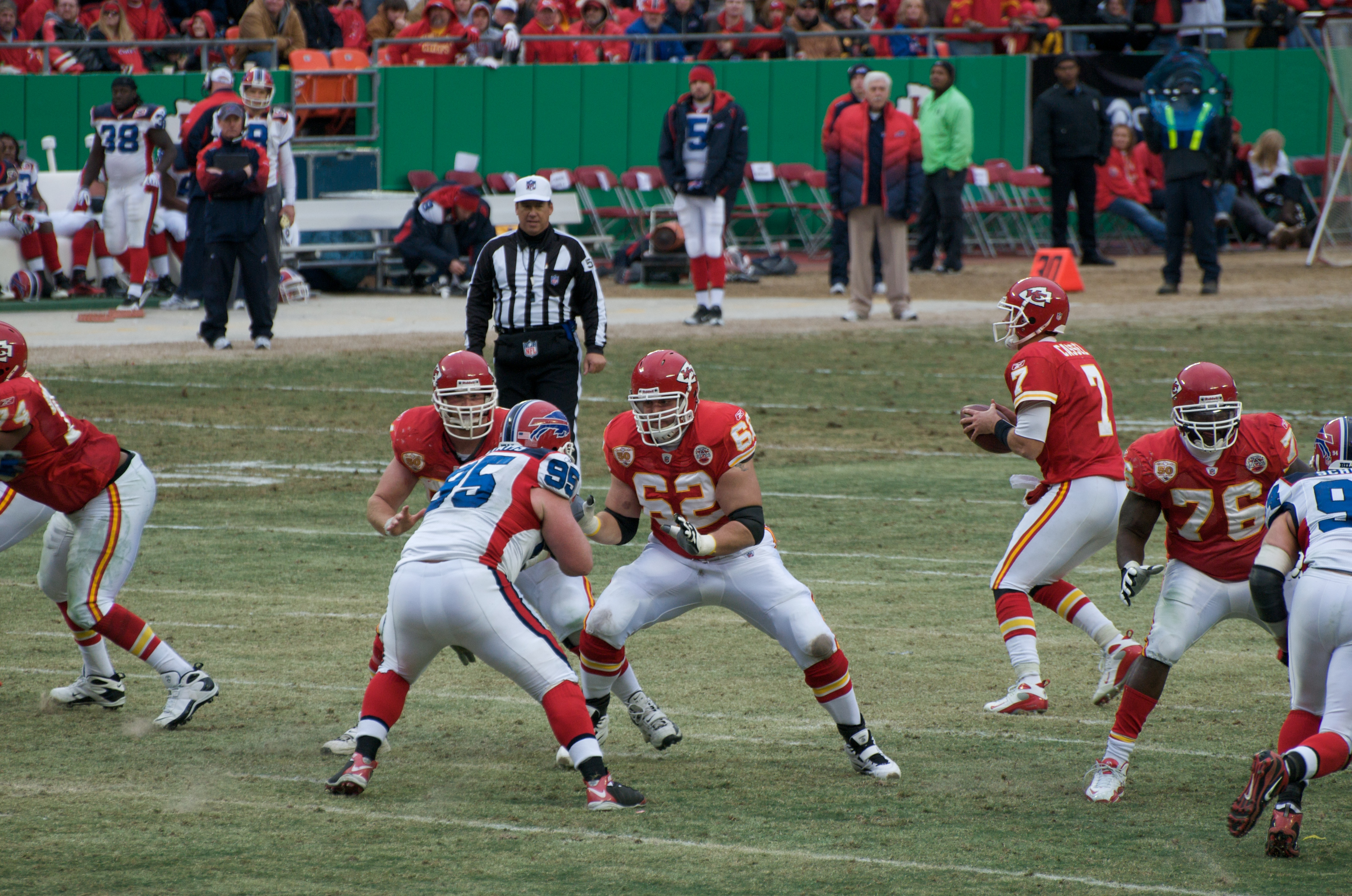
The Chiefs hosting the Bills in 2009. Quarterback Matt Cassel would play for both teams in his career.

The rivalry would begin to slow down in the 2000s as the Bills would enter what would be a 17-year playoff drought, while Kansas City would remain competitive but would not get past the Divisional Round of the playoffs during this time period. Nonetheless, the rivalry gained notoriety as the teams played each other nine out of ten years from 2008 to 2017.

The series still featured some notable moments during this stretch. One such game was the matchup in 2008, when the 54–31 Buffalo victory featured the most combined points between the two teams in the series. Buffalo quarterback Trent Edwards threw for 273 yards with four total touchdowns in the game. For the Chiefs, this game would mark the most allowed points in a single game in franchise history, a record that would be tied in a 2018 game against the Los Angeles Rams.

The 2010 contest between the Bills and Chiefs used all 75 minutes of the game under the league's then-overtime rules. Buffalo tied the game at 10 late in the fourth quarter thanks to a Ryan Fitzpatrick touchdown pass to Stevie Johnson. The game would go to overtime, where both teams would punt on their first possessions, and then both teams would miss potential game winning field goals on their second possessions of overtime, keeping the game going. After the Bills would punt again, the Chiefs would drive down the field, where Ryan Succop would kick the game-winning field goal from 35 yards as the clock expired on the overtime period.

=== 2020–present: Josh Allen vs. Patrick Mahomes ===
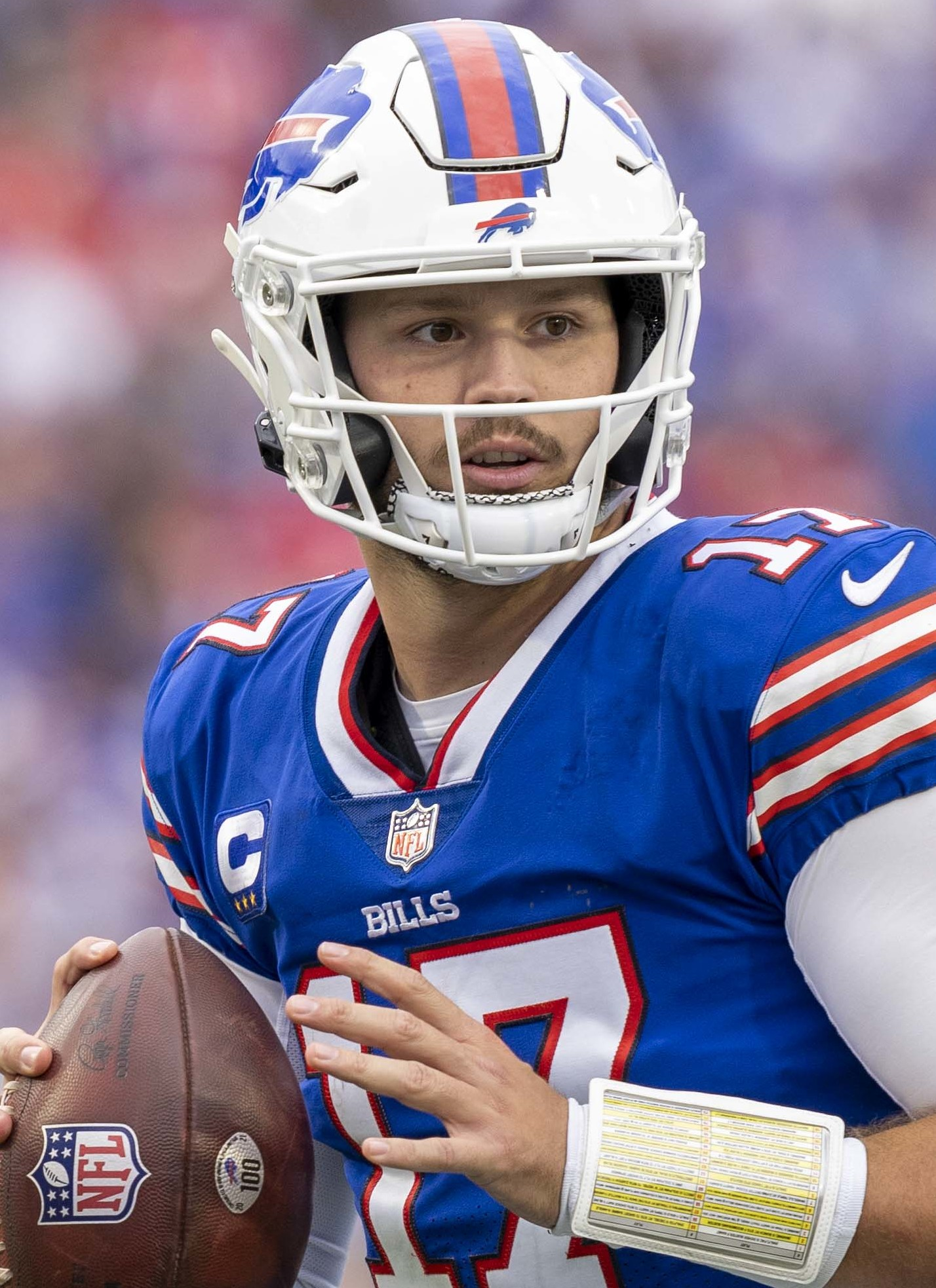
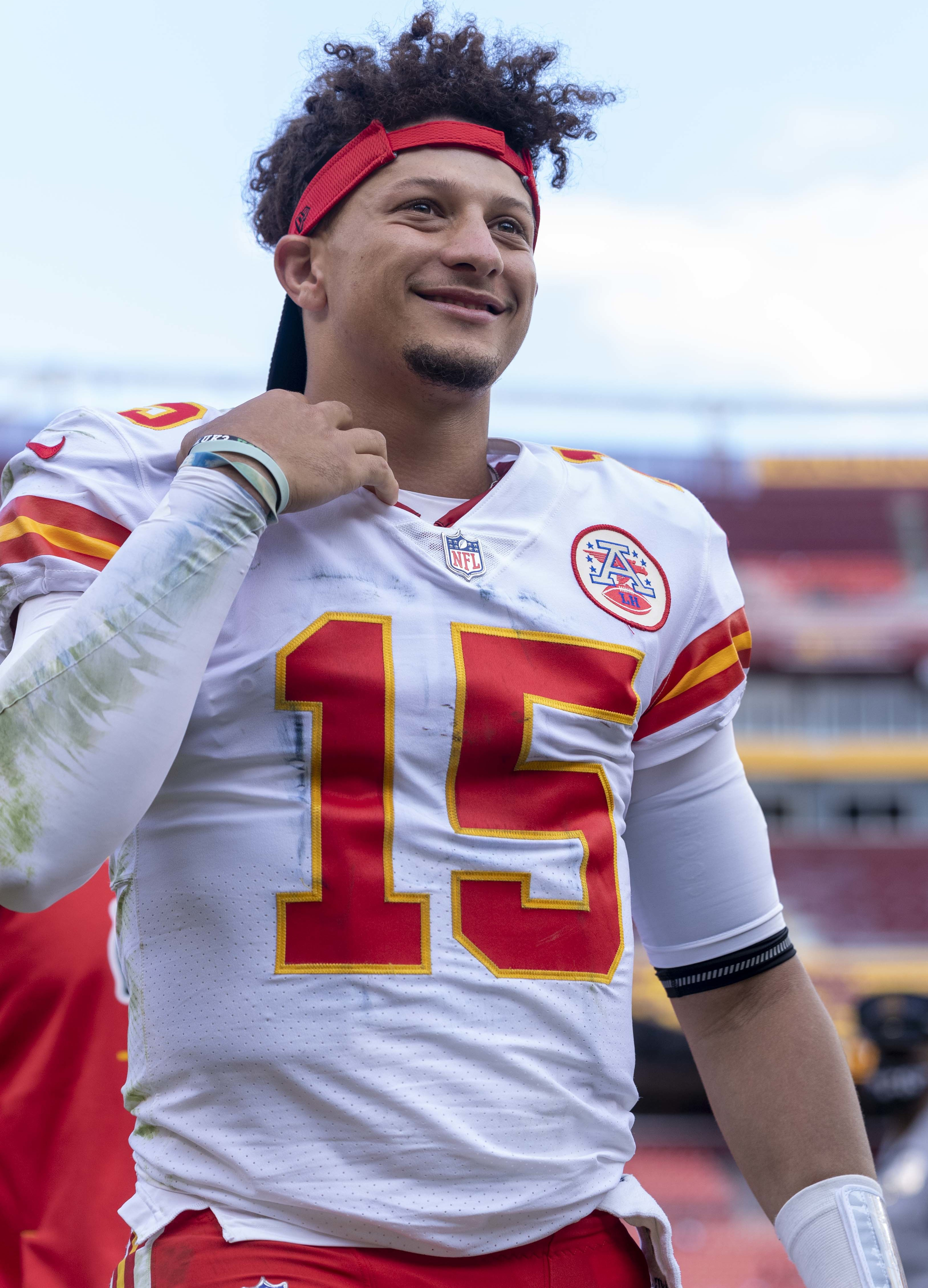
Josh Allen (left) and Patrick Mahomes (right) have been key figures in the rivalry in recent years.

To this date, every game in the current decade between the two teams has featured quarterbacks Josh Allen of the Bills and Patrick Mahomes of the Chiefs, who have become key figures in the rivalry. Both quarterbacks have been noted for their physicality, strong arm strength, and mobile styles of play, where they have demonstrated to escape running with the football while under pressure as well as effectively scramble when called upon. Notably, the Chiefs had traded up in the 2017 NFL draft with Buffalo to select Mahomes, with the Bills obtaining two first round draft picks in return, which they ultimately maneuvered to select Pro-Bowlers such as Tre'Davious White, Tremaine Edmunds, and Dion Dawkins, among other players. Bills head coach Sean McDermott later mentioned he was more comfortable drafting a quarterback early in 2018 as opposed to 2017, choosing Allen 7th overall in 2018 after taking Nathan Peterman in the 5th round the year prior.

The 2020 season marked the first regular season meeting between Allen and Mahomes, in which the Chiefs defeated the Bills, 26–17, in Orchard Park. In the game, Mahomes passed for 225 yards and threw for two touchdown passes, both of which were caught by tight end Travis Kelce, while running back Clyde Edwards-Helaire rushed for 161 yards on the ground. Both teams would meet again in the postseason in the AFC Championship Game at Arrowhead Stadium. Buffalo would take an early 9–0 lead, but the lead would not last, as Kansas City took control of the game in the second quarter, and cruised to a 38–24 victory to repeat as conference champions, allowing them to advance to Super Bowl LV (only to lose to NFC Champions Tampa Bay, led by Buffalo's long-time intradivision nemesis Tom Brady).

Both teams met in the 2021 regular season, where the Bills would defeat Kansas City, 38–20, at Arrowhead Stadium. Josh Allen threw for 315 yards with three passing touchdowns while adding 59 yards on the ground and a rushing touchdown. Mahomes threw two interceptions in the contest, with one of those returned for a touchdown by Bills safety Micah Hyde.

The two teams met in the 2021 AFC Divisional Round of the playoffs, also in Kansas City, where the game would be noted for its dramatic conclusion. The game featured four lead changes and 25 points scored in the final two minutes of regulation. Allen would throw for 329 yards and four touchdown passes for Buffalo, while Mahomes threw for 378 yards and added three touchdown passes for Kansas City. With 13 seconds remaining, Allen threw a touchdown pass to wide receiver Gabe Davis to give the Bills a 36–33 lead. However, Mahomes would lead a 44-yard drive with the little time remaining, resulting in a 49-yard field goal by Chiefs kicker Harrison Butker to tie the game and send it to overtime. Kansas City would win the overtime coin toss, where they would quickly score a touchdown to give the Chiefs the 42–36 win.

The game received praise from commentators for both teams' performances, while also scrutinizing the league's overtime rules. As a result of this game and other similar games in past seasons, the NFL changed the overtime rules for postseason games beginning with the 2022–23 postseason, to allow both teams at least one possession of the football in overtime.

The 2022 game, also in Kansas City, between the two teams was another tight back-and-forth contest as both teams competed closely until the fourth quarter. Kansas City took a 20–17 lead on a field goal with under 10 minutes to play, then the Bills defense forced a three-and-out on the Chiefs next possession. On the ensuing drive, Josh Allen and the Bills offense marched down the field, where Allen would throw a go-ahead touchdown pass to tight end Dawson Knox with just 64 seconds left. On the Chiefs' final possession of the game, Patrick Mahomes was intercepted by Bills cornerback Taron Johnson, preserving a 24–20 victory for Buffalo.

The teams met in Arrowhead Stadium for the fifth straight meeting in 2023. Buffalo got out to a hot start, jumping out to a 14–0 lead. However, Kansas City would tie the game at 17 in the fourth quarter. With under 2 minutes left to play, the Bills re-took the lead on a 39-yard field goal by Tyler Bass. On the Chiefs' ensuing possession, Kansas City appeared to take the lead on a hook and lateral touchdown, as tight end Travis Kelce caught a pass, where he then threw a lateral to wide receiver Kadarius Toney, who ran into the end zone. However, Toney was ruled offside on the play, negating the score. After the penalty on the 2nd down play, Mahomes threw two incomplete passes, turning the ball over on downs, securing the Bills victory.

The two teams met in the 2023 AFC Divisional Round of the playoffs, this time at Orchard Park, New York. In the highly anticipated game, the teams traded the lead five times. After the fifth lead change, in which the Chiefs scored a touchdown to take a three-point lead, the Bills attempted a fake punt after failing to pick up a first down after three tries on the ensuing series, but it failed. A play later, Kansas City advanced the ball down to Buffalo's 3-yard line with a great opportunity to extend their lead to two scores. However, Kansas City wide receiver Mecole Hardman fumbled the ball out the side of the end zone for a touchback, thus allowing Buffalo to regain possession and remain in the game. After the teams traded punts, the Bills advanced the ball into Kansas City territory, but their drive stalled in field goal range. In a play that evoked memories of Wide Right, one of the most infamous plays in Buffalo Bills history, Buffalo kicker Tyler Bass proceeded to miss his field goal attempt wide right, thus allowing Kansas City to take over with their three-point lead still intact. Kansas City then picked up a first down on their next possession to drain the clock and seal the victory.

In the 2024 NFL draft, another high-profile trade occurred between the two intraconference rivals, with Buffalo once again trading down with Kansas City. This allowed the Chiefs to select wideout Xavier Worthy, who had just run the fastest 40-yard dash time in NFL Combine history, while the Bills traded down again with the Carolina Panthers and out of the first round, ultimately drafting receiver Keon Coleman with the 33rd overall pick. The Bills' decision to trade down with the Chiefs again was criticized by the media and fans in the immediate aftermath, especially in the wake of Kansas City winning their third Super Bowl with Mahomes while Buffalo had yet to make it with Allen.

When the teams met in Week 11, the Chiefs sported an undefeated 9–0 record and the Bills an 8–2 record. During the teams' meeting in week 11 of the 2024 season, Coleman was out with an injury while Worthy had a strong first quarter performance, but the latter was largely shut out the rest of the game as the Bills handed the Chiefs their first loss of the season with a strong offensive performance of their own, defeating them 30–21 that was sealed late with a Josh Allen touchdown run.

Kansas City finished as the #1 seed and Buffalo finished as the #2 seed that year and each won their playoff matchups to set up another matchup in the 2024 AFC Championship Game on January 26, 2025, in Kansas City. The game featured several controversial calls primarily against the Bills. Nonetheless, the Chiefs came out victorious 32–29 over the Bills and advanced to Super Bowl LIX. This marked the fourth time in five seasons the Chiefs eliminated the Bills. The broadcast on CBS drew an AFC Championship game record viewing audience of 57.4 million viewers.

== Season–by–season results ==
Buffalo Bills vs. Dallas Texans/Kansas City Chiefs Season-by-Season Results
1960s (Tie, 9–9–1)

Season	Season series	at Buffalo Bills	at Dallas Texans/Kansas City Chiefs	Overall series	Notes
1960	Texans 2–0	Texans; 45–28	Texans; 24–7	Texans; 2–0	Inaugural season for both franchises and the American Football League (AFL). The Bills are placed in the AFL Eastern Division while the Chiefs are placed in the AFL Western Division. In Buffalo, the Texans/Chiefs score their most points in a game against the Bills.
1961	Bills 2–0	Bills; 27–24	Bills; 30–20	Tie; 2–2	
1962	Tie, 1–1	Bills; 23–14	Texans; 41–21	Tie; 3–3	Last season Texans played as a Dallas-based team and under the "Texans" name. The Texans win 1962 AFL Championship.
1963	Bills 1–0–1	Tie; 27–27	Bills; 35–26	Bills; 4–3–1	Texans relocate to Kansas City and rename themselves to the Kansas City Chiefs.
1964	Bills 2–0	Bills; 34–17	Bills; 35–22	Bills; 6–3–1	Bills win 1964 AFL Championship.
1965	Bills 2–0	Bills; 34–25	Bills; 23–7	Bills; 8–3–1	Bills win 1965 AFL Championship.
1966	Tie, 1–1	Chiefs; 42–20	Bills; 29–14	Bills; 9–4–1	
1966 Playoffs	Chiefs 1–0	Chiefs; 31–7		Bills; 9–5–1	AFL Championship Game. Chiefs go on to lose Super Bowl I.
1967	Chiefs 1–0		Chiefs; 23–13	Bills; 9–6–1	
1968	Chiefs 1–0	Chiefs; 18–7		Bills; 9–7–1	
1969	Chiefs 2–0	Chiefs; 29–7	Chiefs; 22–19	Tie; 9–9–1	Chiefs win Super Bowl IV.

1970s (Bills, 3–2)

Season	Results	Location	Overall series	Notes
1971	Chiefs; 22–9	Municipal Stadium	Chiefs; 10–9–1	As a result of the AFL–NFL merger from the previous season, the Bills are placed in the AFC East while the Chiefs are placed in the AFC West.
1973	Bills; 23–14	Rich Stadium	Tie; 10–10–1	First Monday Night Football game in stadium history.
1976	Bills; 50–17	Rich Stadium	Bills; 11–10–1	Bills only home win in the 1976 season. It was their last win of the season, as they went on a 10-game losing streak to finish the season. That losing streak extended to 14 games the following season.
1978	Bills; 28–13	Rich Stadium	Bills; 12–10–1	
1978	Chiefs; 14–10	Arrowhead Stadium	Bills; 12–11–1	

1980s (Bills, 3–1)

Season	Results	Location	Overall series	Notes
1982	Bills; 14–9	Rich Stadium	Bills; 13–11–1	
1983	Bills; 14–9	Arrowhead Stadium	Bills; 14–11–1	Following their win, the Bills went on a 22-road game losing streak.
1986	Chiefs; 20–17	Rich Stadium	Bills; 14–12–1	
1986	Bills; 17–14	Arrowhead Stadium	Bills; 15–12–1	With their win, the Bills snapped a 22-road game losing streak that began following their road win against the Chiefs in the 1983 season.

1990s (Bills, 4–3)

Season	Results	Location	Overall series	Notes
1991	Chiefs; 33–6	Arrowhead Stadium	Bills; 15–13–1	
1991 Playoffs	Bills; 37–14	Rich Stadium	Bills; 16–13–1	AFC Divisional Round. Bills go on to lose Super Bowl XXVI.
1993	Chiefs; 23–7	Arrowhead Stadium	Bills; 16–14–1	
1993 Playoffs	Bills; 30–13	Rich Stadium	Bills; 17–14–1	AFC Championship Game. Bills go on to lose Super Bowl XXVIII.
1994	Bills; 44–10	Rich Stadium	Bills; 18–14–1	Bills record their largest victory against the Chiefs with a 34–point differential.
1996	Bills; 20–9	Rich Stadium	Bills; 19–14–1	
1997	Chiefs; 22–16	Arrowhead Stadium	Bills; 19–15–1	

2000s (Bills, 4–2)

Season	Results	Location	Overall series	Notes
2000	Bills; 21–17	Arrowhead Stadium	Bills; 20–15–1	
2002	Chiefs; 17–16	Arrowhead Stadium	Bills; 20–16–1	
2003	Chiefs; 38–5	Arrowhead Stadium	Bills; 20–17–1	Chiefs record their largest victory against the Bills with a 33–point differential.
2005	Bills; 14–3	Ralph Wilson Stadium	Bills; 21–17–1	
2008	Bills; 54–31	Arrowhead Stadium	Bills; 22–17–1	Bills score their most points in a game against the Chiefs and the game's final score is the highest-scoring game between the two teams. Meanwhile, the Chiefs set a franchise record for their most points allowed in a game.
2009	Bills; 16–10	Arrowhead Stadium	Bills; 23–17–1	

2010s (Chiefs, 4–3)

Season	Results	Location	Overall series	Notes
2010	Chiefs; 13–10 (OT)	Arrowhead Stadium	Bills; 23–18–1	Chiefs kicker Ryan Succop hit a 35-yard field goal as time expired in overtime.
2011	Bills; 41–7	Arrowhead Stadium	Bills; 24–18–1	Bills tied their largest victory against the Chiefs with a 34–point differential (1994).
2012	Bills; 35–17	Ralph Wilson Stadium	Bills; 25–18–1	
2013	Chiefs; 23–13	Ralph Wilson Stadium	Bills; 25–19–1	
2014	Chiefs; 17–13	Ralph Wilson Stadium	Bills; 25–20–1	
2015	Chiefs; 30–22	Arrowhead Stadium	Bills; 25–21–1	Both teams met for the eighth straight season.
2017	Bills; 16–10	Arrowhead Stadium	Bills; 26–21–1	Chiefs make a trade with Bills that allows them to draft QB Patrick Mahomes.

2020s (Tie, 5–5)

Season	Results	Location	Overall series	Notes
2020	Chiefs; 26–17	Bills Stadium	Bills; 26–22–1	First start in the series for Chiefs' QB Patrick Mahomes and Bills' QB Josh Allen.
2020 Playoffs	Chiefs; 38–24	Arrowhead Stadium	Bills; 26–23–1	AFC Championship Game. Chiefs lose Super Bowl LV.
2021	Bills; 38–20	Arrowhead Stadium	Bills; 27–23–1	
2021 Playoffs	Chiefs; 42–36 (OT)	Arrowhead Stadium	Bills; 27–24–1	AFC Divisional Round. The game had four lead changes and 25 points scored in the final two minutes of regulation. After the Bills took the lead with 13 seconds left, the Chiefs drove the ball 44 yards and kicked a field goal to force overtime. The Chiefs won the coin toss and scored a touchdown in overtime.
2022	Bills; 24–20	Arrowhead Stadium	Bills; 28–24–1	Bills secured the win with a Dawson Knox touchdown reception with 1:04 remaining in the fourth quarter. Chiefs' only home loss in the 2022 season. Chiefs win Super Bowl LVII.
2023	Bills; 20–17	Arrowhead Stadium	Bills; 29–24–1	Chiefs' potential game-winning touchdown was negated by an offside penalty committed by WR Kadarius Toney.
2023 Playoffs	Chiefs; 27–24	Highmark Stadium	Bills; 29–25–1	AFC Divisional Round. Bills kicker Tyler Bass missed a game-tying field goal attempt wide right with just under 2:00 remaining. Chiefs go on to win Super Bowl LVIII.
2024	Bills; 30–21	Highmark Stadium	Bills; 30–25–1	Josh Allen rushed for a 26-yard touchdown with 2:17 remaining in the fourth quarter, clinching a victory for the Bills, ending the Chiefs' 15-game winning streak, and handing them their first loss of the season after a 9–0 start.
2024 Playoffs	Chiefs; 32–29	Arrowhead Stadium	Bills; 30–26–1	AFC Championship Game. Chiefs lose Super Bowl LIX.
2025	Bills; 28–21	Highmark Stadium	Bills; 31–26–1	With the Chiefs missing the playoffs for the first time since the 2014 season, the Bills now hold the longest active playoff streak in the NFL, having qualified for the postseason every year since 2019.
2026	November 26	Highmark Stadium	Bills; 31–26–1	Game will take place on Thanksgiving Day.

Summary of Results

Season	Season series	at Buffalo Bills	at Dallas Texans/Kansas City Chiefs	Notes
Regular season	Bills 29–21–1	Bills 14–8–1	Bills 15–13	
Postseason	Chiefs 5–2	Tie 2–2	Chiefs 3–0	AFL Championship: 1966; AFC Divisional: 1991, 2021, 2023; AFC Championship: 1993, 2020, 2024
Regular and postseason	Bills 31–26–1	Bills 16–10–1	Chiefs 16–15	Texans/Chiefs have a 2–1 record in Dallas.

== See also ==
- List of NFL rivalries
