= Gabe Davis =

American football player (born 1999)

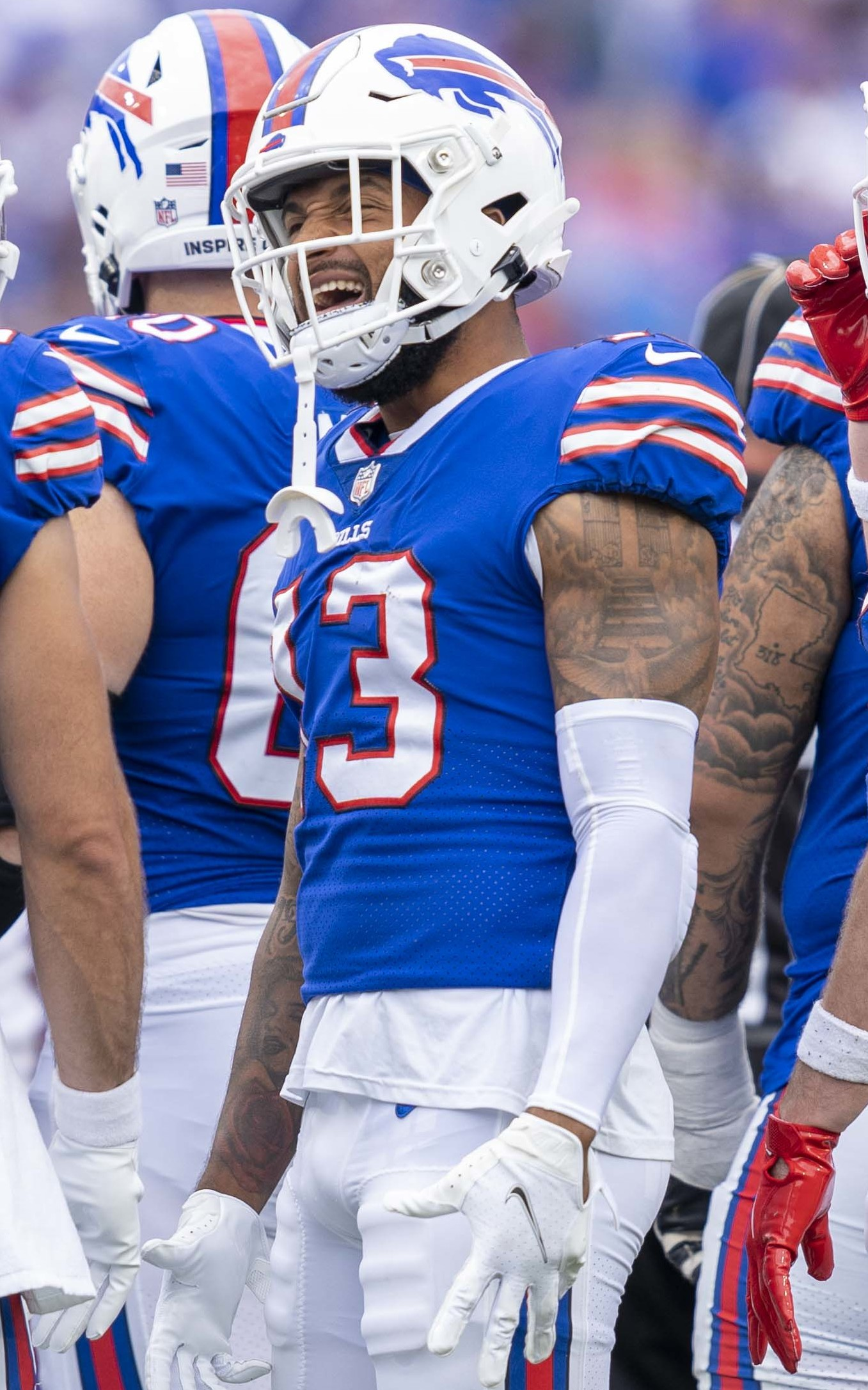
- Davis with the Buffalo Bills in 2021

Profile
- Position: Wide receiver

Personal information
- Born: April 1, 1999 (age 27); Fernandina Beach, Florida, U.S.
- Listed height: 6 ft 2 in (1.88 m)
- Listed weight: 225 lb (102 kg)

Career information
- High school: Seminole (Sanford, Florida)
- College: UCF (2017–2019)
- NFL draft: 2020: 4th round, 128th overall pick

Career history
- Buffalo Bills (2020–2023); Jacksonville Jaguars (2024); Buffalo Bills (2025)

Awards and highlights
- Third-team All-American (2019); First-team All-AAC (2019); Second-team All-AAC (2018); NFL record: Most receiving touchdowns in a playoff game: 4

Career NFL statistics as of 2025
- Receptions: 195
- Receiving yards: 3,098
- Receiving touchdowns: 30
- Stats at Pro Football Reference

Gabriel Davis (born April 1, 1999) is an American professional football wide receiver. He played college football for the UCF Knights and was selected by the Bills in the fourth round of the 2020 NFL draft. Davis has been nicknamed "Big-Game Gabe" due to his performance in important games, particularly his four touchdowns in the 2021 AFC Divisional playoff game.

After his rookie contract with the Bills expired, Davis signed with the Jacksonville Jaguars for the 2024 season, but missed most of it due to injury and was later released by the Jaguars. He ultimately ended up signing another deal with Buffalo to return to the Bills.

== Early life ==
Davis attended Seminole High School in Sanford, Florida. While there, he played high school football. As a senior, he had 69 receptions for 1,347 yards and 17 touchdowns, earning him First-team Florida Class 8A All-State honors. He committed to the University of Central Florida (UCF) to play college football.

== College career ==
As a true freshman at UCF in 2017, Davis played in and started all 13 games, recording 27 receptions for 391 yards and four touchdowns. As a sophomore in 2018, he started 12 of 13 games and had 53 receptions for 815 yards and seven touchdowns. He returned as a starter his junior year in 2019, catching 72 passes for 1241 yards. After the season, Davis entered the 2020 NFL draft.

== Professional career ==
Pre-draft measurables
Height	Weight	Arm length	Hand span	Wingspan	40-yard dash	10-yard split	20-yard split	20-yard shuttle	Three-cone drill	Vertical jump	Broad jump	Bench press
6 ft 2 in (1.88 m)	216 lb (98 kg)	32 1/4 in (0.82 m)	9 1/4 in (0.23 m)	6 ft 5 1/2 in (1.97 m)	4.54 s	1.56 s	2.66 s	4.59 s	7.08 s	35.0 in (0.89 m)	10 ft 4 in (3.15 m)	14 reps
All values from NFL Combine

=== Buffalo Bills (first stint) ===
==== 2020 season ====
The Buffalo Bills selected Davis in the fourth round with the 128th overall pick in the 2020 NFL draft. Davis signed a four-year, $3.99 million contract, including a $699,000 signing bonus, with the Bills on May 8, 2020. In Week 2, against the Miami Dolphins, he scored his first professional touchdown on a six-yard reception from Josh Allen. The following week, Davis would catch four passes for a career-high 81 yards. During week four, Davis caught one pass, a 26-yard touchdown from Josh Allen. In Week 12 against the Los Angeles Chargers, Davis recorded three catches for 79 yards, including a 20-yard touchdown reception from fellow wide receiver Cole Beasley during the 27–17 win. Overall, Davis finished his rookie season with 35 receptions for 599 receiving yards and seven receiving touchdowns.

During the Wild Card Round of the playoffs against the Indianapolis Colts, Davis caught four passes for 85 yards, including two sideline grabs that set up Buffalo's second touchdown, as the Bills won 27–24, their first playoff win in 25 years.

==== 2021 season ====
In Week 10 against the New York Jets, Davis caught all three of his targets for 105 yards, a season high. Overall in the 2021 season, Davis appeared in 16 games, of which he started four. He had 35 receptions on 63 targets for 539 yards and six touchdowns, as the Bills finished the regular season with a 11–6 record to win the AFC East for a second consecutive season. In the Wild Card Round, he caught two passes for 41 yards and a touchdown in Buffalo's 47–17 rout of the New England Patriots.

In the Divisional Round against the Kansas City Chiefs, Davis had a breakout performance, catching a career-high 201 yards on eight catches, and scoring an NFL record four receiving touchdowns in a playoff game during the 42–36 overtime loss. He became just the ninth player in NFL history to record 200+ receiving yards in a playoff game.

==== 2022 season ====
During Week 5 against the Pittsburgh Steelers, Davis finished with 171 receiving yards and two touchdowns. Davis had a career-high 98-yard touchdown catch in the first quarter and a one-handed catch for a 62-yard touchdown four drives later as the Bills won 38–3. Davis's 98-yard catch tied the record for longest touchdown reception in franchise history. Davis finished the 2022 season with 48 receptions for 836 receiving yards and seven receiving touchdowns in 15 games.

In the Wild Card Round of the playoffs, Davis had six receptions for 113 receiving yards and a touchdown in the 34–31 victory over the Dolphins.

==== 2023 season ====
Davis was named one of the Bills' captains before the start of the season. In Week 5, against the Jacksonville Jaguars, Davis had six receptions for 100 yards and a touchdown in the 25–20 loss. The loss was the last game of a four-game stretch for Davis where he scored a touchdown in each game. In Week 16 against the Chargers, he had four receptions for 130 yards and a touchdown in the 24–22 win. He finished the 2023 season with 45 receptions for 746 yards and seven touchdowns.

=== Jacksonville Jaguars ===
On March 13, 2024, Davis signed a three-year contract worth $39 million with the Jacksonville Jaguars. with $24 million guaranteed including a $10 million signing bonus and a $10 million option bonus. On November 18, Jaguars coach Doug Pederson announced that Davis would miss the rest of the season due a torn meniscus in his left knee; Davis ended the season with 20 catches for 239 yards and two touchdowns. Davis later revealed he also had a torn PCL.

On May 7, 2025, the Jaguars released Davis, likely due to worries about his recovery from injury as well as the good performance of 2024 rookie Brian Thomas Jr. and the selection of 2025 first-round pick Travis Hunter.

=== Buffalo Bills (second stint) ===
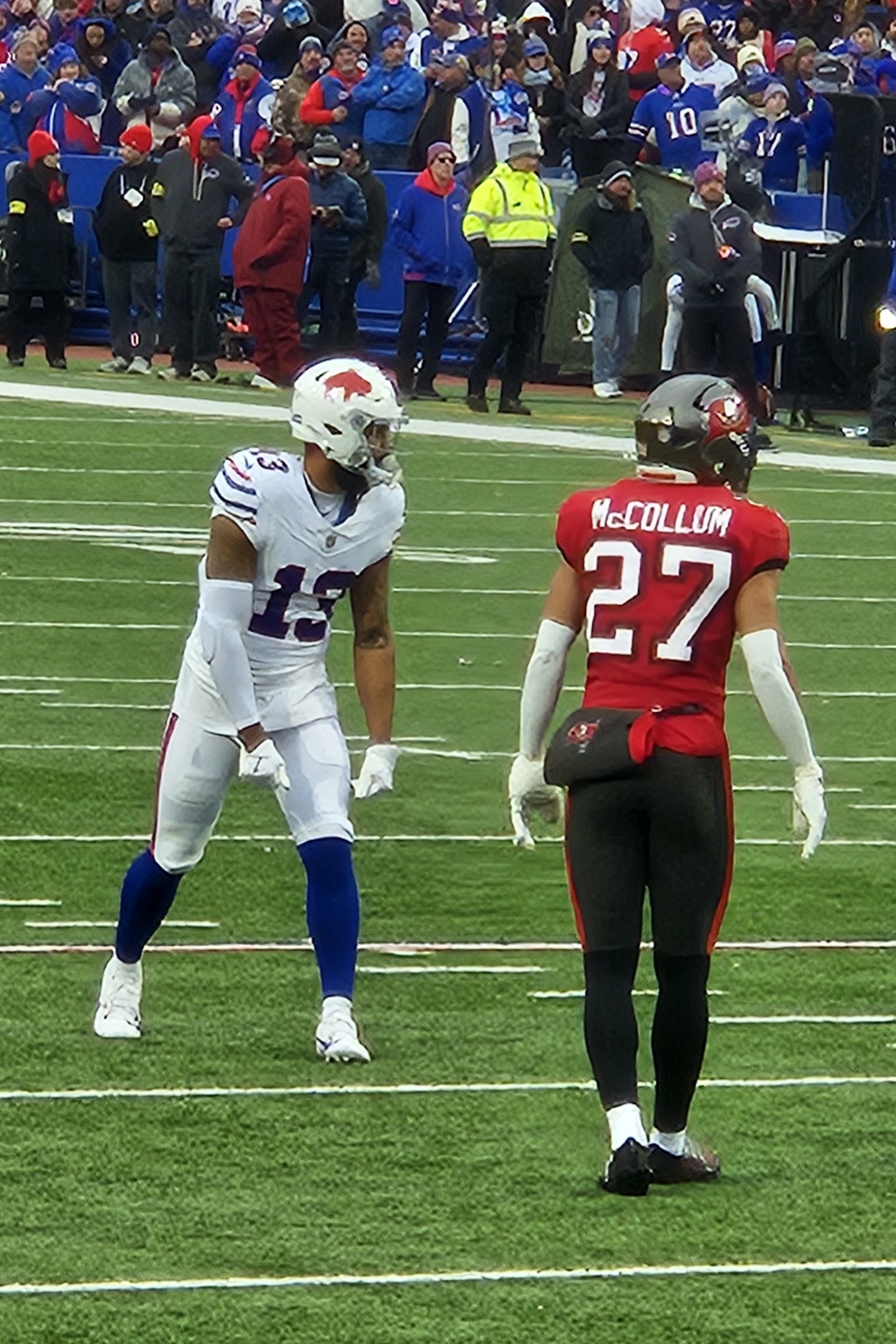
Davis lining up against Zyon McCollum of the Tampa Bay Buccaneers in 2025

On September 2, 2025, Davis signed with the Buffalo Bills' practice squad and was subsequently placed on the practice squad/injured list as he continued to recover. On October 29, Davis was activated to the practice squad. He was elevated to the active roster against the Tampa Bay Buccaneers following the benching of Keon Coleman. Gaining the start, Davis caught three of four targets for 40 yards as the Bills won 44–32. Following another elevation to the active roster the following week against the Houston Texans, Davis was signed to the active roster on November 28. In his first season back with the Bills, Davis caught 12 passes for 129 yards and a touchdown in six games played.

During the wild card round of the playoffs against his former team in the Jaguars, Davis caught two passes before suffering a hard hit from Jaguars safety Andrew Wingard to the same knee he injured, requiring him to be carted off the field. The following day on January 12, 2026, it was revealed that Davis had torn his ACL, ending his season.

== Career statistics ==
Legend
	Led the league
**Bold**	Career high

=== NFL ===
==== Regular season ====
Year	Team	Games		Receiving						Fumbles	
Year	Team	GP	GS	Tgt	Rec	Yds	Avg	Lng	TD	Fum	Lst
2020	BUF	16	11	62	35	599	17.1	56	**7**	**1**	0
2021	BUF	16	4	63	35	549	15.7	49	6	0	0
2022	BUF	15	15	**93**	**48**	**836**	**17.4**	**98**	**7**	**1**	**1**
2023	BUF	15	15	76	43	746	16.9	57	**7**	**1**	**1**
2024	JAX	10	9	42	20	239	12.0	22	2	**1**	**1**
2025	BUF	6	4	18	12	129	10.8	22	1	0	0
Career		80	60	359	195	3,098	15.9	98	30	4	3

==== Postseason ====
Year	Team	Games		Receiving						Fumbles	
Year	Team	GP	GS	Tgt	Rec	Yds	Avg	Lng	TD	Fum	Lst
2020	BUF	3	2	11	4	85	21.3	37	0	0	0
2021	BUF	2	0	**13**	**10**	**242**	**24.2**	**75**	**5**	0	0
2022	BUF	2	2	**13**	9	147	18.4	33	1	0	0
2023	BUF	0	0	Did not play due to injury							
2025	BUF	1	1	3	2	14	7.0	9	0	0	0
Career		8	5	40	24	488	20.3	75	6	0	0

=== College ===
Season	Team	GP	Receiving				
Season	Team	GP	Rec	Yds	Avg	Lng	TD
2017	UCF	10	27	391	14.5	**80**	4
2018	UCF	12	53	815	15.4	75	7
2019	UCF	12	**72**	**1,241**	**17.2**	73	**12**
Career		34	152	2,447	16.1	80	23
Source: UCF Knights Website

== Personal life ==
Davis was raised by his mother, Alana Davis. He has two siblings, Jordan and Kayla. Davis grew up an Orlando Magic fan, growing up in the Central Florida area and playing at UCF.
