= 2021 AFC Divisional playoff game (Buffalo–Kansas City) =

2022 NFL playoff game

13 Seconds
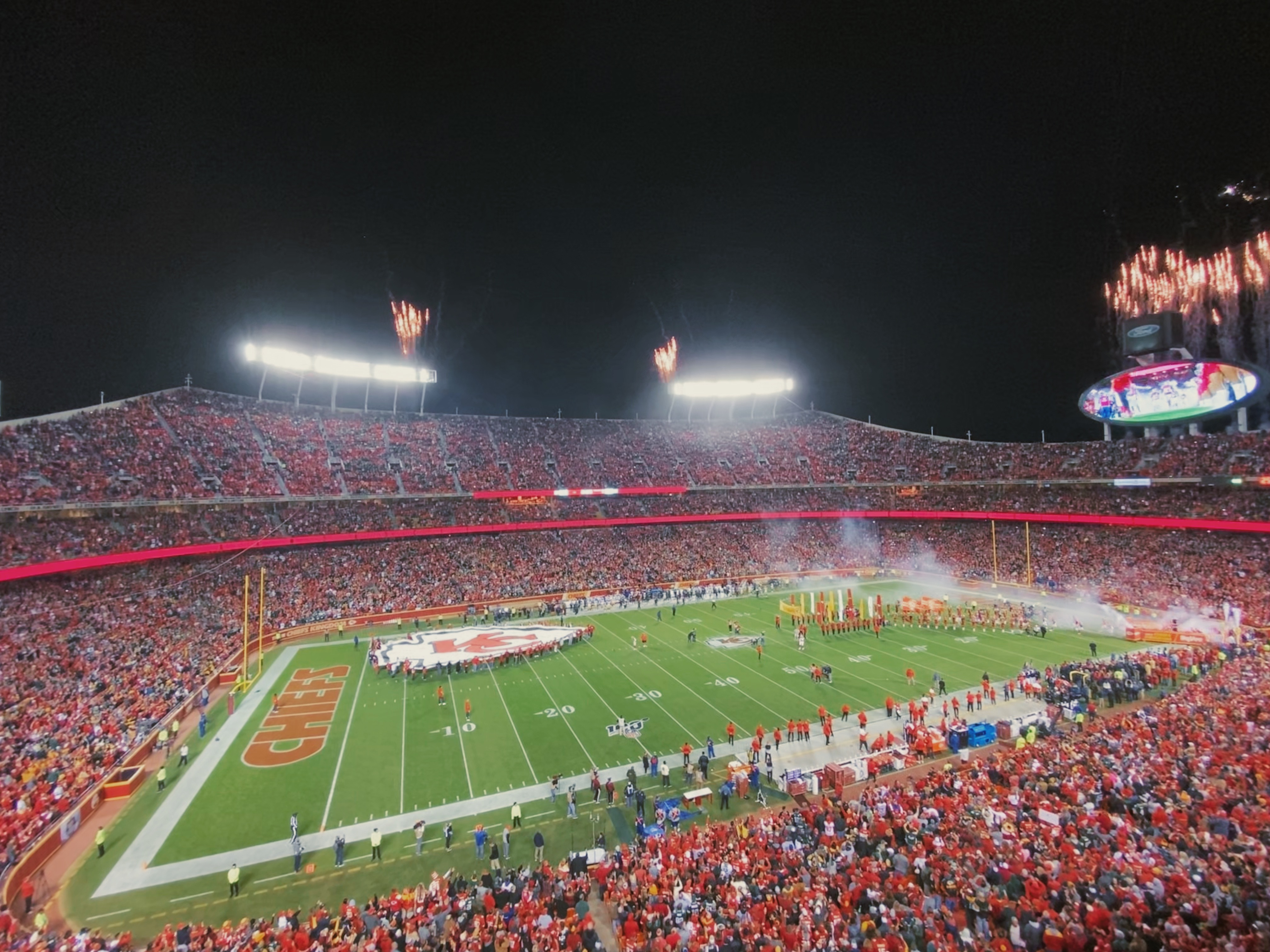
- Arrowhead Stadium, the site of the game, in 2019
Buffalo Bills (3) (11–6)	Kansas City Chiefs (2) (12–5)
36	42
Head coach: Sean McDermott	Head coach: Andy Reid
	1	2	3	4	OT	Total
BUF	7	7	7	15	0	36
KC	7	7	9	13	6	42
- Date: January 23, 2022
- Stadium: Arrowhead Stadium; Kansas City, Missouri
- Favorite: Chiefs by 1.5
- Referee: John Hussey
- Attendance: 73,242

TV in the United States
- Network: CBS
- Announcers: Jim Nantz (play-by-play); Tony Romo (color analyst); Jay Feely (sideline reporter); Tracy Wolfson (sideline reporter); Gene Steratore (rules analyst)/Armando Quintero (play-by-play)
- Nielsen ratings: 55.3 (Kansas City); 53.6 (Buffalo); U.S. TV viewership: 42.74 million

Radio in the United States
- Announcers: John Murphy (play-by-play); Eric Wood (color analyst); Sal Capacchio (sideline reporter)/Mitch Holthus (play-by-play); Danan Hughes (color analyst); Josh Klingler (sideline reporter)/Kevin Kugler (play-by-play); Ryan Harris (color analyst); Olivia Harlan-Dekker (sideline reporter)

The 2021 Buffalo Bills–Kansas City Chiefs AFC Divisional playoff game was a National Football League (NFL) game held on January 23, 2022, as part of the 2021–22 NFL playoffs. The Kansas City Chiefs defeated the visiting Buffalo Bills 42–36 to advance to the AFC Championship Game. It is colloquially known as "13 Seconds" after the Chiefs' game-tying drive and considered an example of the Buffalo sports curse. (Note: Attributed to multiple references:) Noted for the quarterback play of Buffalo's Josh Allen and Kansas City's Patrick Mahomes, it was the first NFL game in which each quarterback threw for at least 300 yards, three touchdowns, and no interceptions and rushed for at least 50 yards.

The game had four lead changes and 25 points scored in the final two minutes of regulation, the second-most among all games in the Super Bowl era. (Note: The most was five lead changes and 36 points scored during the Baltimore Ravens' 29–26 victory over the Minnesota Vikings in the 2013 regular season.) (Note: Attributed to multiple references:) After scoring on their opening drive, the Bills did not regain the lead until the fourth quarter when Allen threw a go-ahead touchdown pass with under two minutes remaining. Mahomes responded with a 64-yard touchdown pass to regain the lead with less than a minute remaining, but Buffalo's next possession ended in another touchdown pass from Allen. With 13 seconds left, Mahomes led the Chiefs on a 44-yard drive, which set up a game-tying field goal to force overtime. The Chiefs received the overtime kickoff after winning the coin toss and scored a touchdown to secure the victory. Despite the loss, Bills wide receiver Gabe Davis set the NFL playoff game record for receiving touchdowns at four.

The performances of both teams, particularly Allen and Mahomes, drew praise from commentators, who considered the game to be one of the greatest in NFL history. (Note: Attributed to multiple references:) The game also renewed scrutiny of the NFL's overtime rules, (Note: Attributed to multiple references:) which were changed beginning with the 2022 postseason and extended into the 2025 regular season to assure both teams of one possession in overtime.

== Background ==
The Chiefs finished the regular season with a 12–5 record to clinch their sixth straight AFC West title and the #2-seed of the American Football Conference (AFC). The Bills compiled an 11–6 record to win their second consecutive AFC East title and the #3-seed. At the end of the regular season, the Bills had the highest point differential and margin of victory, but lost every game that was within one possession.

With the emergence of quarterback Patrick Mahomes in 2018, the Chiefs became one of the top teams in the league. They hosted the AFC Championship Game over the past three seasons, appeared in the Super Bowl over the past two, and won Super Bowl LIV. The Bills had been on the rise since the breakout season of quarterback Josh Allen in 2020 and won consecutive AFC East division titles. The two teams met in the previous season's AFC Championship, which the Chiefs won 38–24. A regular season rematch followed on Sunday Night Football, in which the Bills defeated the Chiefs 38–20.

The day before the game, the top-seeded Tennessee Titans were defeated in the divisional round by the #4-seed Cincinnati Bengals, guaranteeing the winner of the Buffalo–Kansas City matchup would host the AFC Championship Game. A Chiefs victory would make them the first NFL team to host four consecutive conference championships, while the Bills would host the AFC Championship for the first time since 1993 if they won.

== Game summary ==
=== First quarter ===
Buffalo started off the game with a 15-play, 71-yard drive in which they converted two fourth downs, the second with a one-yard touchdown run by Devin Singletary to go up 7–0. Kansas City responded with a 13-play, 74-yard drive in which quarterback Patrick Mahomes rushed three times for 48 yards, the last carry being an eight-yard touchdown run to tie the game 7–7.

=== Second quarter ===
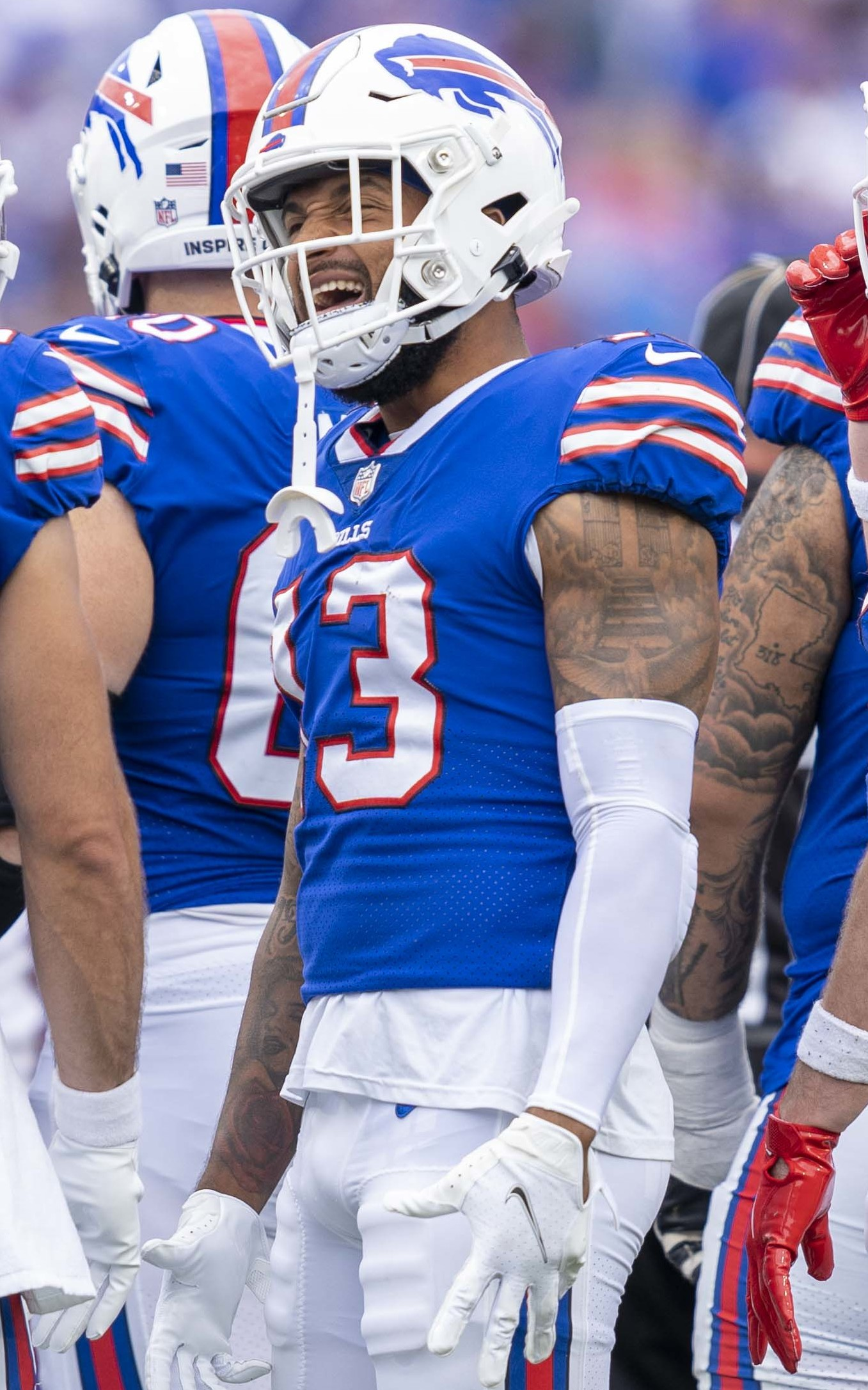
Gabe Davis' four touchdown receptions in the game set a new single-game NFL playoff record

In the second quarter, Mahomes completed a 21-yard pass to Travis Kelce and Clyde Edwards-Helaire rushed for a 22-yard gain on an 81-yard drive to score on Mahomes' two-yard touchdown pass to Byron Pringle, giving the Chiefs a 14–7 lead. The Bills countered with a drive in which Josh Allen rushed twice for 20 yards and completed 5/5 passes for 55, the last an 18-yard touchdown completion to Gabe Davis, tying the score at 14–14 with 42 seconds left in the half. Kansas City then advanced to the Bills 32, but Butker missed a 50-yard field goal attempt as the second quarter clock ran out.

=== Third quarter ===
The Chiefs started the second half with a 64-yard, 15-play drive, featuring a 20-yard catch by running back Jerick McKinnon. Butker finished it with a 39-yard field goal to give the team a 17–14 lead. After a punt, Edwards-Helaire rushed for a 20-yard gain and then receiver Mecole Hardman ran an end around play 25 yards for a touchdown, giving the Chiefs a 23–14 lead after Butker missed the extra point. Kansas City seemed to be pulling away from the Bills, but on the first play of Buffalo's next drive, Allen threw a 75-yard touchdown completion to Davis, making the score 23–21 with 2:06 left in the third quarter.

=== Fourth quarter ===
In the final period, Chiefs receiver Tyreek Hill returned a punt 45 yards to the Bills 16-yard line before being tackled by punter Matt Haack. Three plays later, Butker kicked a 28-yard field goal to put Kansas City up 26–21. Buffalo then covered 75 yards in 19 plays on a drive where they once again converted two fourth downs. On 4th-and-4 from the Chiefs 24, Allen scrambled six yards for a first down. Three plays later, Singletary was then tackled for a six-yard loss on 3rd-and-7 as the clock ticked down to the two-minute warning. When faced with 4th-and-13, Allen threw a 27-yard touchdown pass to Davis, and followed it up with a pass to Stefon Diggs for a two-point conversion that gave the Bills a 29–26 lead with 1:54 left on the clock. Kansas City stormed back, moving 75 yards in seven plays and taking a 33–29 lead on Mahomes' 64-yard touchdown pass to Hill. Taking the ball back with 57 seconds remaining, Allen completed passes to Davis for gains of 28 and 12 yards before hitting Emmanuel Sanders with a 16-yard completion on the Kansas City 19-yard line. Then with just 13 seconds left on the clock, Allen threw a 19-yard touchdown pass to Davis to give Buffalo a 36–33 lead. On the subsequent kickoff, the Bills controversially elected to kick long rather than taking a squib kick to try and run off some of the clock; the ball went dead in the end zone, resulting in a touchback. Mahomes completed a 19-yard pass to Hill that ran just five seconds off the clock, then he threw a 25-yard pass to Kelce, giving Kansas City a first down on the Bills 31-yard line after running down another five seconds. On the next play, Butker's 49-yard field goal sent the game into overtime. Kelce was wearing an NFL Films microphone for the game, and audio footage from the two offensive plays of the 13-second drive revealed that Kelce instructed Hill to run the route which led to the success of the first completion, and revealed him suggesting to Mahomes that he might improvise his own route on the second offensive play if the Bills' defensive scheme didn't change. Prior to the snap, Mahomes realized Kelce's suggested improvised route would work and shouted "Do it, Kelce!", before finding his tight-end for a completion of 25 yards.

=== Overtime ===
Kansas City won the coin toss to begin the overtime period and elected to receive the ball. Getting the ball first in overtime, Mahomes rushed for four yards and completed all five of his passes passes for 50 yards, including a 16-yard pass to McKinnon and a 26-yard throw to Hardman. On the next play, Mahomes threw an eight-yard touchdown pass to Kelce to win the game for Kansas City.

=== Statistics ===
2021–22 AFC Divisional Round: Buffalo Bills vs. Kansas City Chiefs

Quarter	1	2	3	4	OT	Total
Bills	7	7	7	15	0	36
Chiefs	7	7	9	13	6	42

at Arrowhead Stadium, Kansas City, Missouri

- Date: January 23, 2022
- Game time: 6:40 p.m. EST/5:40 p.m. CST
- Game weather: 37 °F (3 °C)
- Game attendance: 73,242
- Referee: John Hussey
- TV announcers (CBS): Jim Nantz, Tony Romo, Tracy Wolfson, and Jay Feely
- Recap, Game Book

Game information

First quarter

- BUF – Devin Singletary 1-yard run (Tyler Bass kick), 8:03. Bills 7–0. Drive: 13 plays, 71 yards, 6:57.
- KC – Patrick Mahomes 8-yard run (Harrison Butker kick), 2:26. Tied 7–7. Drive: 11 plays, 74 yards, 5:37.

Second quarter

- KC – Byron Pringle 2-yard pass from Patrick Mahomes (Harrison Butker kick), 1:52. Chiefs 14–7. Drive: 12 plays, 86 yards, 6:51.
- BUF – Gabe Davis 18-yard pass from Josh Allen (Tyler Bass kick), 0:37. Tied 14–14. Drive: 7 plays, 75 yards, 1:15.

Third quarter

- KC – Harrison Butker 39-yard field goal, 7:01. Chiefs 17–14. Drive: 13 plays, 54 yards, 7:59.
- KC – Mecole Hardman 25-yard run (kick failed), 2:06. Chiefs 23–14. Drive: 5 plays, 61 yards, 2:43.
- BUF – Gabe Davis 75-yard pass from Josh Allen (Tyler Bass kick), 1:56. Chiefs 23–21. Drive: 1 play, 75 yards, 0:10.

Fourth quarter

- KC – Harrison Butker 28-yard field goal, 8:55. Chiefs 26–21. Drive: 4 plays, 6 yards, 2:33.
- BUF – Gabe Davis 27-yard pass from Josh Allen (Josh Allen–Stefon Diggs pass), 1:54. Bills 29–26. Drive: 17 plays, 75 yards, 7:01.
- KC – Tyreek Hill 64-yard pass from Patrick Mahomes (Harrison Butker kick), 1:02. Chiefs 33–29. Drive: 5 plays, 75 yards, 0:52.
- BUF – Gabe Davis 19-yard pass from Josh Allen (Tyler Bass kick), 0:13. Bills 36–33. Drive: 6 plays, 75 yards, 0:49.
- KC – Harrison Butker 49-yard field goal, 0:00. Tied 36–36. Drive: 3 plays, 44 yards, 0:13.

Overtime

- KC – Travis Kelce 8-yard pass from Patrick Mahomes, 10:45. Chiefs 42–36. Drive: 8 plays, 75 yards, 4:15.

Top passers

- BUF – Josh Allen – 27/37, 329 yards, 4 TD
- KC – Patrick Mahomes – 33/44, 378 yards, 3 TD

Top rushers

- BUF – Josh Allen – 11 rushes, 68 yards
- KC – Patrick Mahomes – 7 rushes, 69 yards, TD

Top receivers

- BUF – Gabe Davis – 8 receptions, 201 yards, 4 TD
- KC – Tyreek Hill – 11 receptions, 150 yards, TD

== Aftermath and reactions ==
"When it's grim, be the grim reaper and go get it."

— Chiefs coach Andy Reid to his quarterback Patrick Mahomes prior the game-tying drive at the end of regulation

The game was hailed as one of the greatest modern NFL playoff games, with some commentators initially proclaiming it not only as the best playoff game in history, but one of the greatest games ever played. (Note: Attributed to multiple references:) It was the finale to a divisional round where every game came down to the final play; the other three games played that weekend were decided by game-winning field goals.

Early figures showed CBS averaging 34.5 million viewers for the game, but parent company ViacomCBS later said it was closer to 43 million, with a peak of 51.6 million at its frenetic conclusion. The gane was the highest-rated divisional game on any network since the 2017 playoffs. In the Chiefs' home market of Kansas City, 90 percent of households tuned in at the game's climax. On Twitter, Dan Rather, Stephen A. Smith, Candace Parker, and Magic Johnson were among those reacting to the game's ending.

Immediately after the game-winning touchdown pass, Mahomes ran across the field to locate Allen, where the two quarterbacks embraced and exchanged words of respect. Even before the game took place commentators drew comparisons between the competitive rivalry between Mahomes and Allen, who combined for over 700 passing yards and seven touchdowns in the game, and that of Tom Brady and Peyton Manning. (Note: Attributed to multiple references:) Upton Bell compared the matchup favorably to The Greatest Game Ever Played; he said, "I've been watching football for 75 years, and nothing compares to this Buffalo–Kansas City game. I have never seen two quarterbacks in a playoff game play at a higher level than Allen and Mahomes. I was at the 1958 Colts–Giants championship, and that doesn't compare to this game."

The Bills were criticized for not using a squib kick on the final kickoff in regulation, where they instead kicked through the endzone for a touchback. This decision left 13 seconds for the Chiefs, who had all three timeouts remaining, to quickly drive into field goal range for the game-tying kick. Had Buffalo kicked in-bounds and forced the Chiefs to return the ball, more time would have elapsed in the game and the Chiefs likely would not have been able to drive downfield to get into field goal range. However, some people, such as popular sports YouTuber UrinatingTree, have argued that using a squib kick would have likely given the Chiefs better field position, therefore possibly still allowing the Chiefs to get into field goal range and kick the game-tying kick before the end of regulation. Bills head coach Sean McDermott simply stated, "That starts with me" when asked about why the team did not opt to squib kick. Buffalo fans soon referred to the game as "13 Seconds". (Note: Attributed to multiple references:) Erik Brady of The Buffalo News equated the loss to the phenomenon of triskaidekaphobia, the fear or avoidance of the number 13, especially the coincidence that the 13th tarot card depicts The Grim Reaper, the subject of Andy Reid's motivational talk to Patrick Mahomes in the final seconds of regulation.

As an homage to Bills fans' practice of crowdfunding charities as an act of gratitude, Chiefs fans sent a series of $13 donations to Allen's foundation, which supports Oishei Children's Hospital in Buffalo. In the following days after the game, Oishei Children's Hospital announced that Chiefs fans had raised $312,800 to donate to the hospital. In return, Bills fans encouraged their own cause to donate to Hope House in Kansas City, a shelter that helps victims of domestic violence.

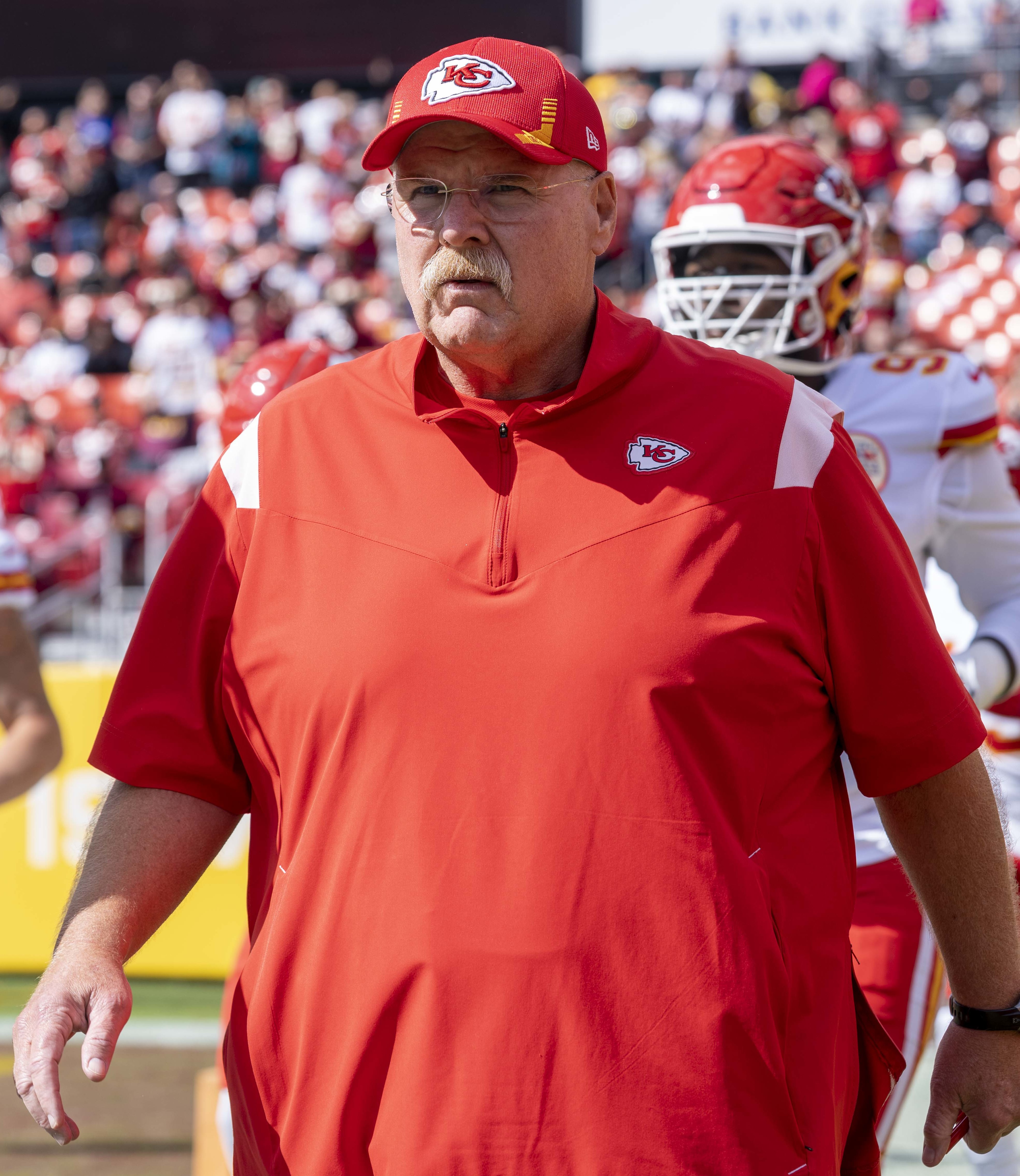
Andy Reid became the first NFL coach to lead two different franchises to four consecutive conference championship games.

The victory allowed Kansas City to advance to its fourth consecutive AFC Championship Game, becoming the first NFL team to host a conference championship game in four consecutive years. With the victory, Chiefs head coach Andy Reid became the first NFL coach to lead two different teams to four straight conferences championships. Reid previously led the Philadelphia Eagles to the NFC Championship Game from 2001 to 2004.

During the AFC Championship Game between the Chiefs and the Cincinnati Bengals, Butker also converted a game-tying field goal at the end of regulation and the Chiefs won the overtime coin toss to receive the ball first. Allen jokingly responded on his Twitter account to Kansas City winning a second consecutive coin toss by tweeting "Pain." However, Mahomes was intercepted 13 seconds into the Chiefs' drive, which led to the Bengals winning 27–24 off a field goal from Evan McPherson. The official Bengals Twitter responded to Reid's comment by tweeting "DON'T FEAR THE REAPER!", after Blue Öyster Cult's song of the same name.

The following July, this AFC Divisional game won the 2022 ESPY Award for Best Game.

The Bills and Chiefs met again in Week 6 of the 2022 season in Kansas City, with both teams having identical 4–1 records. The first half of that game ended in a similar fashion to the finish of the 2021 iteration. After a second quarter Gabe Davis touchdown reception, the Chiefs trailed 10–7 with 12 seconds left in the half. However, Mahomes led the Chiefs down the field the Bills' 43-yard line, where Harrison Butker kicked a successful 62-yard field goal to tie the game at 10. The Bills went on to win the game 24–20 on a Dawson Knox touchdown reception with 1:04 remaining in the fourth quarter.

The Chiefs and Bills would play again in the playoffs two years later, in which Kansas City won on the road 27–24. They met again in the AFC Championship Game the following year, in which Kansas City won 32–29.

=== Overtime rules ===
The NFL's overtime rules received renewed criticism following the game. Several commentators argued Allen should have been given the opportunity to play in overtime and felt the Chiefs' victory was mostly attributable to winning the coin toss. The outcome was compared to Kansas City's loss in the 2018 AFC Championship Game, in which Mahomes was unable to play in overtime after the New England Patriots won the coin toss and scored a touchdown on their opening drive. This prompted the Chiefs to unsuccessfully lobby for changes to the overtime rules, which would later benefit them against the Bills.

Following the game, Reid stated he was still open to a rule change that would allow both teams the opportunity to receive the ball in overtime. Bills tackle Dion Dawkins was among the players critical of the overtime rules, remarking that the league "should never let a football game be determined from a coin". Conversely, Allen said he had no issue with the overtime rules and Buffalo did not do enough to win the game. Mahomes, acknowledging the rules' impact on the 2018 AFC Championship, remarked, "All you can do is play the way the rules are explained and that's what we did today."

The Bengals winning the AFC Championship against the Chiefs, despite losing the overtime coin toss, prompted defense of the rules. Discussing football's team-based nature, commentators noted the Bengals defense made a key stop in overtime, which the Bills defense could not do in the Divisional game.

At the owners' meetings in March 2022, the league voted to change the postseason overtime rules beginning with the 2022–23 NFL playoffs to ensure both teams have one possession, with the rule being extended into the regular season in April 2025. The first playoff game to go into overtime under the new rules was Super Bowl LVIII between the Chiefs and San Francisco 49ers the following postseason. The rule change did not impact the outcome of the game because the 49ers were only able to score a field goal after winning the coin toss and choosing to receive possession, which the Chiefs answered with a touchdown to win the championship. However, after the game, several 49ers players admitted that they were not aware of the rule change before they chose to receive the ball first.

== Officials ==
- Referee: John Hussey (#35)
- Umpire: Alan Eck (#76)
- Down judge: Mark Hittner (#28)
- Line judge: Carl Johnson (#101)
- Field judge: Rick Patterson (#15)
- Side judge: Allen Baynes (#56)
- Back judge: Dino Paganelli (#105)
- Replay official: James Nicholson (#0)

== See also ==
- Bills–Chiefs rivalry
- Two-minute drill
