= 2023–24 NFL playoffs =

American football tournament

- Dates: January 13 – February 11, 2024
- Season: 2023
- Teams: 14
- Games played: 13
- Super Bowl LVIII site: Allegiant Stadium; Paradise, Nevada
- Defending champions: Kansas City Chiefs
- Champion: Kansas City Chiefs (4th title)
- Runner-up: San Francisco 49ers
- Conference runners-up: Baltimore Ravens; Detroit Lions
NFL playoffs
← 2022–23	2024–25 →

The National Football League playoffs for the 2023 season began on January 13, 2024, and concluded with Super Bowl LVIII on February 11 at Allegiant Stadium in Paradise, Nevada, with the Kansas City Chiefs defeating the San Francisco 49ers by a score of 22-25 in overtime.

This was the first postseason since 1998 not to feature either Peyton Manning or Tom Brady, as they had played their final NFL games in the 2015 and 2022 seasons, respectively.

In the Wild Card round, the No. 7 seed Green Bay Packers defeated the No. 2 seed Dallas Cowboys, becoming the first No. 7 seed ever to win a playoff game since the introduction of the format in 2020. The Detroit Lions won their first playoff game since 1991 by defeating the Los Angeles Rams. This was the 15th consecutive NFL postseason in which at least one team scored at least 40 points in a game, achieved by both the Houston Texans and the Green Bay Packers.

The Kansas City Chiefs became the first team to win back-to-back Super Bowls since the New England Patriots successfully did so in 2003 and 2004. They were also the first team to win the Super Bowl as a 3 seed since the 2006 Colts. In addition, it marked only the second Super Bowl to go into overtime, the other being Super Bowl LI in 2016–17.

== Participants ==
Within each conference, the four division winners and the top three non-division winners with the best overall regular season records qualified for the playoffs. The four division winners are seeded 1–4 based on their overall won-lost-tied record, and the wild card teams are seeded 5–7. The NFL does not use a fixed bracket playoff system, and there are no restrictions regarding teams from the same division matching up in any round. In the first round, dubbed the Wild Card playoffs, the second-seeded division winner hosts the seventh seed wild card, the third seed hosts the sixth seed, and the fourth seed hosts the fifth seed. The 1 seed from each conference receives a first-round bye. In the second round, the Divisional playoffs, the number 1 seed hosts the lowest-seeded surviving team from the first round (seed 4, 5, 6, or 7), while the other two surviving teams play each other, with the higher-seeded team hosting. The two surviving teams from each conference's divisional playoff games then meet in the respective AFC and NFC Conference Championships, hosted by the higher seed. Although the Super Bowl, the championship round of the playoffs, is played at a neutral site, the designated home team is based on an annual rotation by conference.

Playoff seeds
Seed	AFC	NFC
1	Baltimore Ravens (North winner)	San Francisco 49ers (West winner)
2	Buffalo Bills (East winner)	Dallas Cowboys (East winner)
3	Kansas City Chiefs (West winner)	Detroit Lions (North winner)
4	Houston Texans (South winner)	Tampa Bay Buccaneers (South winner)
5	Cleveland Browns (wild card)	Philadelphia Eagles (wild card)
6	Miami Dolphins (wild card)	Los Angeles Rams (wild card)
7	Pittsburgh Steelers (wild card)	Green Bay Packers (wild card)

== Bracket ==
Jan 15 – Raymond James Stadium	Jan 21 – Ford Field
5	Philadelphia	9
4	Tampa Bay	32
4	Tampa Bay	23
Jan 28 – Levi's Stadium
Jan 14 – Ford Field	3	Detroit	31
NFC
6	LA Rams	23	3	Detroit	31
Jan 20 – Levi's Stadium
3	Detroit	24	1	San Francisco	34
NFC Championship
Jan 14 – AT&T Stadium	7	Green Bay	21
1	San Francisco	24
7	Green Bay	48
Divisional round	Feb 11 – Allegiant Stadium
2	Dallas	32
Wild-card round
N1	San Francisco	22
Jan 13 – Arrowhead Stadium	Jan 21 – Highmark Stadium	A3	Kansas City	25*
Super Bowl LVIII
6	Miami	7
3	Kansas City	26
3	Kansas City	27
Jan 28 – M&T Bank Stadium
Jan 15 – Highmark Stadium	2	Buffalo	24
AFC
7	Pittsburgh	17	3	Kansas City	17
Jan 20 – M&T Bank Stadium
2	Buffalo	31	1	Baltimore	10
AFC Championship
Jan 13 – NRG Stadium	4	Houston	10
1	Baltimore	34
5	Cleveland	14
4	Houston	45

* Indicates overtime victory

== Schedule ==
The playoffs began with Wild Card Weekend on January 13–15, 2024. The Divisional round was played on January 20–21, with the winners of those games advancing to the Conference Championship games on January 28. Super Bowl LVIII was played on February 11 at Allegiant Stadium in Paradise, Nevada.

Round	Away team	Score	Home team	Date	Kickoff (ET / UTC–5)	National TV Network(s)	Streaming	Viewers (millions)	TV rating
Wild-card round	Cleveland Browns	14–45	Houston Texans	January 13, 2024	4:35 p.m.	NBC	Peacock	29.2	12.8
Wild-card round	Miami Dolphins	7–26	Kansas City Chiefs	January 13, 2024	8:15 p.m.	—N/a (Note: Peacock's game was simulcast locally on NBC stations WTVJ in Miami and KSHB in Kansas City.)	Peacock	23.0	9.2
Wild-card round	Green Bay Packers	48–32	Dallas Cowboys	January 14, 2024	4:35 p.m.	Fox	—N/a	40.2	19.1
Wild-card round	Los Angeles Rams	23–24	Detroit Lions	January 14, 2024	8:15 p.m.	NBC	Peacock	36.0	15.6
Wild-card round	Pittsburgh Steelers	17–31	Buffalo Bills	January 15, 2024	4:35 p.m. (Note: The Pittsburgh–Buffalo game was rescheduled from a January 14, 1:05 p.m. kickoff due to a state of emergency and travel ban declared in the Buffalo area as a result of a massive snowstorm.)	CBS	Paramount+	31.1	15.7
Wild-card round	Philadelphia Eagles	9–32	Tampa Bay Buccaneers	January 15, 2024	8:15 p.m.	ABC/ESPN	ESPN+	29.2	15.1
Divisional round	Houston Texans	10–34	Baltimore Ravens	January 20, 2024	4:35 p.m.	ABC/ESPN	ESPN+	32.4	16.2
Divisional round	Green Bay Packers	21–24	San Francisco 49ers	January 20, 2024	8:15 p.m.	Fox	—N/a	37.5	17.8
Divisional round	Tampa Bay Buccaneers	23–31	Detroit Lions	January 21, 2024	3:05 p.m.	NBC	Peacock	40.5	18.6
Divisional round	Kansas City Chiefs	27–24	Buffalo Bills	January 21, 2024	6:40 p.m.	CBS	Paramount+	50.4	24.2
Conference championships	Kansas City Chiefs	17–10	Baltimore Ravens	January 28, 2024	3:05 p.m.	CBS	Paramount+	55.5	25.5
Conference championships	Detroit Lions	31–34	San Francisco 49ers	January 28, 2024	6:40 p.m.	Fox	—N/a	56.7	25.1
Super Bowl LVIII Allegiant Stadium Paradise, Nevada	San Francisco 49ers	22–25 (OT)	Kansas City Chiefs	February 11, 2024	6:40 p.m.	CBS/Nickelodeon	Paramount+	123.7	43.5

== Wild-card round ==
=== Saturday, January 13, 2024 ===
==== AFC: Houston Texans 45, Cleveland Browns 14 ====
Cleveland Browns vs. Houston Texans – Game summary

Quarter	1	2	3	4	Total
Browns	7	7	0	0	14
Texans	10	14	14	7	45

at NRG Stadium, Houston, Texas

- Date: January 13, 2024
- Game time: 4:35 p.m. EST/3:35 p.m. CST
- Game weather: None (retractable roof closed)
- Game attendance: 71,946
- Referee: Clay Martin
- TV announcers (NBC/Peacock): Noah Eagle, Todd Blackledge, and Kathryn Tappen
- Recap, Game Book

Game information

First quarter

- HOU – Kaʻimi Fairbairn 21-yard field goal, 5:29. Texans 3–0. Drive: 7 plays, 43 yards, 2:54.
- CLE – Kareem Hunt 1-yard run (Riley Patterson kick), 2:09. Browns 7–3. Drive: 6 plays, 75 yards, 3:20.
- HOU – Nico Collins 15-yard pass from C. J. Stroud (Kaʻimi Fairbairn kick), 0:11. Texans 10–7. Drive: 4 plays, 75 yards, 1:58.

Second quarter

- CLE – Kareem Hunt 11-yard pass from Joe Flacco (Riley Patterson kick), 12:18. Browns 14–10. Drive: 6 plays, 75 yards, 2:53.
- HOU – Brevin Jordan 76-yard pass from C. J. Stroud (Kaʻimi Fairbairn kick), 12:00. Texans 17–14. Drive: 1 play, 76 yards, 0:18.
- HOU – Dalton Schultz 37-yard pass from C. J. Stroud (Kaʻimi Fairbairn kick), 1:11. Texans 24–14. Drive: 8 plays, 71 yards, 4:33.

Third quarter

- HOU – Steven Nelson 82-yard interception return (Kaʻimi Fairbairn kick), 6:05. Texans 31–14.
- HOU – Christian Harris 36-yard interception return (Kaʻimi Fairbairn kick), 4:06. Texans 38–14.

Fourth quarter

- HOU – Devin Singletary 19-yard run (Kaʻimi Fairbairn kick), 13:27. Texans 45–14. Drive: 6 plays, 50 yards, 3:00.

Top passers

- CLE – Joe Flacco – 34/46, 307 yards, TD, 2 INT
- HOU – C. J. Stroud – 16/21, 274 yards, 3 TD

Top rushers

- CLE – Kareem Hunt – 8 rushes, 26 yards, TD
- HOU – Devin Singletary – 13 rushes, 66 yards, TD

Top receivers

- CLE – David Njoku – 7 receptions, 93 yards
- HOU – Nico Collins – 6 receptions, 96 yards, TD

This was the first postseason meeting between the Browns and Texans. During the regular season, the Browns defeated the Texans 36–22 in Houston in Week 16. Deshaun Watson, who was the starting quarterback for Cleveland since 2022, suffered a season-ending injury in Week 10. He was the starting quarterback for Houston from 2017 to 2020.

After a competitive first half that was led by the Texans, they took a commanding lead after the turn of the half, in which Joe Flacco threw back-to-back interceptions that were returned for touchdowns. This was the Texans' first playoff win since the 2019 season.

==== AFC: Kansas City Chiefs 26, Miami Dolphins 7 ====
Miami Dolphins vs. Kansas City Chiefs – Game summary

Quarter	1	2	3	4	Total
Dolphins	0	7	0	0	7
Chiefs	7	9	3	7	26

at Arrowhead Stadium, Kansas City, Missouri

- Date: January 13, 2024
- Game time: 8:10 p.m. EST/7:10 p.m. CST
- Game weather: −4 °F (−20 °C)
- Game attendance: 71,492
- Referee: Brad Rogers
- TV announcers (Peacock): Mike Tirico, Jason Garrett, and Kaylee Hartung
- Recap, Game Book

Game information

First quarter

- KC – Rashee Rice 11-yard pass from Patrick Mahomes (Harrison Butker kick), 11:05. Chiefs 7–0. Drive: 9 plays, 69 yards, 3:55.

Second quarter

- KC – Harrison Butker 28-yard field goal, 14:51. Chiefs 10–0. Drive: 10 plays, 48 yards, 3:12.
- MIA – Tyreek Hill 53-yard pass from Tua Tagovailoa (Jason Sanders kick), 14:01. Chiefs 10–7. Drive: 2 plays, 62 yards, 0:50.
- KC – Harrison Butker 26-yard field goal, 7:36. Chiefs 13–7. Drive: 12 plays, 72 yards, 6:25.
- KC – Harrison Butker 32-yard field goal, 0:18. Chiefs 16–7. Drive: 7 plays, 47 yards, 1:25.

Third quarter

- KC – Harrison Butker 21-yard field goal, 7:49. Chiefs 19–7. Drive: 13 plays, 69 yards, 5:32.

Fourth quarter

- KC – Isiah Pacheco 3-yard run (Harrison Butker kick), 11:06. Chiefs 26–7. Drive: 14 plays, 72 yards, 7:01.

Top passers

- MIA – Tua Tagovailoa – 20/39, 199 yards, TD, INT
- KC – Patrick Mahomes – 23/41, 262 yards, TD

Top rushers

- MIA – Raheem Mostert – 8 rushes, 33 yards
- KC – Isiah Pacheco – 24 rushes, 89 yards, TD

Top receivers

- MIA – Tyreek Hill – 5 receptions, 62 yards, TD
- KC – Rashee Rice – 8 receptions, 130 yards, TD

This was the fourth postseason matchup between the Dolphins and Chiefs, with Miami winning all three previous contests. The most recent playoff meeting between these two teams was in the 1994–95 Wild Card round, which Miami won 27–17. It was the first postseason clash between the two teams in Kansas City since Christmas Day 1971, which remains the longest NFL game played; the Dolphins won that game 27–24 after two overtime periods. During the regular season, the Chiefs defeated the Dolphins 21–14 in a neutral-site game in Frankfurt, Germany in Week 9. This was the first game where Dolphins receiver Tyreek Hill returned to Arrowhead Stadium since he left the Chiefs.

With a kickoff temperature of −4 °F (−20 °C), this became the fourth coldest NFL game in history. The game was dominated by Kansas City, whose defense held the league's top offense to just 7 points. With the Lions winning their playoff game against the Rams the next day, Miami became the team with the longest playoff game win drought.

With 28 million viewers watching, Peacock recorded their busiest day in history on January 13.

Technically, it was the first regionally televised game in the NFL playoffs since the 1982-83 NFL playoffs, when the first round games were regionally televised, since the Peacock stream was out of market; the game was televised on NBC affiliates in Miami and Kansas City.

=== Sunday, January 14, 2024 ===
==== NFC: Green Bay Packers 48, Dallas Cowboys 32 ====
Green Bay Packers vs. Dallas Cowboys – Game summary

Quarter	1	2	3	4	Total
Packers	7	20	14	7	48
Cowboys	0	7	9	16	32

at AT&T Stadium, Arlington, Texas

- Date: January 14, 2024
- Game time: 4:35 p.m. EST/3:35 p.m. CST
- Game weather: None (retractable roof closed)
- Game attendance: 93,799
- Referee: Ronald Torbert
- TV announcers (Fox): Kevin Burkhardt, Greg Olsen, Erin Andrews, and Tom Rinaldi
- Recap, Game Book

Game information

First quarter

- GB – Aaron Jones 3-yard run (Anders Carlson kick), 7:08. Packers 7–0. Drive: 12 plays, 75 yards, 7:52.

Second quarter

- GB – Aaron Jones 1-yard run (Anders Carlson kick), 14:15. Packers 14–0. Drive: 3 plays, 19 yards, 1:28.
- GB – Dontayvion Wicks 20-yard pass from Jordan Love (kick failed), 3:23. Packers 20–0. Drive: 10 plays, 93 yards, 5:44.
- GB – Darnell Savage 64-yard interception return (Anders Carlson kick), 1:50. Packers 27–0.
- DAL – Jake Ferguson 1-yard pass from Dak Prescott (Brandon Aubrey kick), 0:00. Packers 27–7. Drive: 12 plays, 55 yards, 1:50.

Third quarter

- DAL – Brandon Aubrey 34-yard field goal, 9:23. Packers 27–10. Drive: 12 plays, 60 yards, 5:37.
- GB – Aaron Jones 9-yard run (Anders Carlson kick), 6:38. Packers 34–10. Drive: 5 plays, 75 yards, 2:45.
- DAL – Tony Pollard 1-yard run (kick failed), 3:03. Packers 34–16. Drive: 5 plays, 75 yards, 2:45.
- GB – Luke Musgrave 38-yard pass from Jordan Love (Anders Carlson kick), 1:27. Packers 41–16. Drive: 3 plays, 75 yards, 1:36.

Fourth quarter

- GB – Romeo Doubs 3-yard pass from Jordan Love (Anders Carlson kick), 10:23. Packers 48–16. Drive: 8 plays, 40 yards, 4:37.
- DAL – Jake Ferguson 7-yard pass from Dak Prescott (Rico Dowdle run), 5:54. Packers 48–24. Drive: 11 plays, 75 yards, 4:29.
- DAL – Jake Ferguson 14-yard pass from Dak Prescott (Dak Prescott run), 3:25. Packers 48–32. Drive: 4 plays, 91 yards, 1:24.

Top passers

- GB – Jordan Love – 16/21, 272 yards, 3 TD
- DAL – Dak Prescott – 41/60, 403 yards, 3 TD, 2 INT

Top rushers

- GB – Aaron Jones – 21 rushes, 118 yards, 3 TD
- DAL – Tony Pollard – 15 rushes, 56 yards, TD

Top receivers

- GB – Romeo Doubs – 6 receptions, 151 yards, TD
- DAL – CeeDee Lamb – 9 receptions, 110 yards

Despite being 7-point underdogs, the Packers dominated the Cowboys throughout the game.

The Packers elected to receive the opening kickoff and drove 75 yards in almost 8 minutes, capping the drive with a rushing touchdown from Aaron Jones from 3 yards out to go up 7–0. After the teams traded punts, cornerback Jaire Alexander intercepted a Dak Prescott pass deep in Cowboys territory. The Packers cashed in the turnover early in the second quarter with another Aaron Jones touchdown run, from one yard out to go up 14–0. Following a Cowboys punt, the Packers drove 93 yards, capping the drive with a 20-yard touchdown pass from Jordan Love to Dontayvion Wicks. The extra point went wide, leaving the score at 20–0. On the next drive, Prescott threw his second interception, which Darnell Savage returned 64 yards for a touchdown with 1:50 remaining in the 1st half, extending the Packers' lead to 27-0. The Cowboys rebounded with a touchdown on the last play of the half when Jake Ferguson caught a 1-yard pass from Prescott, cutting the lead to 27–7.

In the second half, the Packers extended their lead to 32 points, 48–16, with 10:23 left in the 4th quarter, before the Cowboys scored back-to-back touchdowns and two successful 2-point conversions to reduce the deficit to 16 points, though the game was effectively already decided in favor of the Packers. The game ended after the Cowboys turned the ball over on downs on their last drive with less than 20 seconds left, sealing the Packers' victory.

With the win, the Packers improved to 6–0 at AT&T Stadium all-time (including their win in Super Bowl XLV). They became the first seventh seed to beat a second seed - and the Cowboys became the first second seed to lose to a seventh seed - since the playoffs expanded to 14 teams in the 2020 season. The loss snapped the Cowboys' 16-game home win streak. The Cowboys also became the first team in NFL history to have won 12 or more games in three straight seasons without reaching a conference championship game.

This was the ninth overall postseason matchup in the rivalry between the Cowboys and Packers. The postseason series between the two teams had been tied 4–4, with the most recent meeting being in the 2016 NFC Divisional Playoffs, which the Packers won 34–31 in Arlington. The teams did not meet in the 2023 regular season.

==== NFC: Detroit Lions 24, Los Angeles Rams 23 ====
Los Angeles Rams vs. Detroit Lions – Game summary

Quarter	1	2	3	4	Total
Rams	3	14	3	3	23
Lions	14	7	3	0	24

at Ford Field, Detroit, Michigan

- Date: January 14, 2024
- Game time: 8:15 p.m. EST
- Game weather: None (indoor stadium)
- Game attendance: 66,367
- Referee: Craig Wrolstad
- TV announcers (NBC/Peacock): Mike Tirico, Cris Collinsworth, and Melissa Stark
- Recap, Game Book

Game information

First quarter

- DET – David Montgomery 1-yard run (Michael Badgley kick), 9:30. Lions 7–0. Drive: 10 plays, 75 yards, 5:30.
- LAR – Brett Maher 24-yard field goal, 4:26. Lions 7–3. Drive: 11 plays, 69 yards, 5:04.
- DET – Jahmyr Gibbs 10-yard run (Michael Badgley kick), 1:31. Lions 14–3. Drive: 5 plays, 75 yards, 2:55.

Second quarter

- LAR – Puka Nacua 50-yard pass from Matthew Stafford (Brett Maher kick), 13:24. Lions 14–10. Drive: 6 plays, 72 yards, 3:07.
- DET – Sam LaPorta 2-yard pass from Jared Goff (Michael Badgley kick), 7:12. Lions 21–10. Drive: 11 plays, 75 yards, 6:12.
- LAR – Tutu Atwell 38-yard pass from Matthew Stafford (Brett Maher kick), 4:02. Lions 21–17. Drive: 6 plays, 75 yards, 3:10.

Third quarter

- DET – Michael Badgley 54-yard field goal, 8:41. Lions 24–17. Drive: 9 plays, 44 yards, 4:36.
- LAR – Brett Maher 27-yard field goal, 2:33. Lions 24–20. Drive: 10 plays, 66 yards, 6:08.

Fourth quarter

- LAR – Brett Maher 29-yard field goal, 8:10. Lions 24–23. Drive: 13 plays, 79 yards, 6:43.

Top passers

- LAR – Matthew Stafford – 25/36, 367 yards, 2 TD
- DET – Jared Goff – 22/27, 277 yards, TD

Top rushers

- LAR – Kyren Williams – 13 rushes, 61 yards
- DET – David Montgomery – 14 rushes, 57 yards, TD

Top receivers

- LAR – Puka Nacua – 9 receptions, 181 yards, TD
- DET – Amon-Ra St. Brown – 7 receptions, 110 yards

This was the second overall postseason meeting between the Rams and Lions. The first came in the 1952 National Conference Championship, which the Lions won 31–21 in Detroit. It was the Lions' first home playoff game since 1993 and only their third since winning their last NFL title in 1957. It was also their first playoff game at Ford Field. This game was also notable for being the first postseason clash between Matthew Stafford and Jared Goff, the starting quarterbacks for the Rams and Lions respectively. Each had previously played for the other team before being traded for each other prior to the 2021 season. The Rams and Lions did not meet during the regular season.

The Lions wound up victorious by a final score of 24–23, their first victory in a postseason game since 1991 and only their second in the Super Bowl era. In his first game in Detroit as an opposing player, Stafford completed 25 of 36 passes for 367 yards and two touchdowns. Meanwhile, Goff completed 22 of 27 passes for 277 yards and a touchdown. Los Angeles Pro Bowl receiver Puka Nacua set a rookie record for receiving yards in a postseason game with nine catches for 181 receiving yards while also scoring a touchdown. The record would then be surpassed by Ladd McConkey the following year. Amon-Ra St. Brown was Detroit's leading receiver with seven catches for 110 receiving yards. Although neither team turned the ball over, the Rams were undone by an ineffective red zone offense: zero touchdowns in three red zone trips, while Detroit converted all three of its red zone trips into touchdowns.

With this victory, the Lions no longer had fewer playoff victories in their own stadium than another NFL team, as they equaled the Pittsburgh Steelers who had won Super Bowl XL at Ford Field. The victory, combined with the #2-seeded Cowboys' loss to the Packers earlier that day, also meant that the Lions would host two games in a single postseason for the first time in franchise history. This was the first time a team from Detroit advanced in a postseason since 2013, when the Detroit Tigers won an ALDS matchup against the Oakland Athletics.

=== Monday, January 15, 2024 ===
==== AFC: Buffalo Bills 31, Pittsburgh Steelers 17 ====
Pittsburgh Steelers vs. Buffalo Bills – Game summary

Quarter	1	2	3	4	Total
Steelers	0	7	3	7	17
Bills	14	7	3	7	31

at Highmark Stadium, Orchard Park, New York

- Date: January 15, 2024
- Game time: 4:35 p.m. EST
- Game weather: Partly cloudy, 17 °F (−8 °C)
- Game attendance: 70,040
- Referee: Carl Cheffers
- TV announcers (CBS/Paramount+): Jim Nantz, Tony Romo, Tracy Wolfson, and Jay Feely
- Recap, Game Book

Game information

First quarter

- BUF – Dawson Knox 9-yard pass from Josh Allen (Tyler Bass kick), 7:02. Bills 7–0. Drive: 10 plays, 80 yards, 5:33.
- BUF – Dalton Kincaid 29-yard pass from Josh Allen (Tyler Bass kick), 4:10. Bills 14–0. Drive: 1 play, 29 yards, 0:05.

Second quarter

- BUF – Josh Allen 52-yard run (Tyler Bass kick), 7:01. Bills 21–0. Drive: 8 plays, 80 yards, 3:51.
- PIT – Diontae Johnson 10-yard pass from Mason Rudolph (Chris Boswell kick), 1:39. Bills 21–7. Drive: 5 plays, 33 yards, 0:35.

Third quarter

- PIT – Chris Boswell 40-yard field goal, 8:50. Bills 21–10. Drive: 9 plays, 38 yards, 4:34.
- BUF – Tyler Bass 45-yard field goal, 1:32. Bills 24–10. Drive: 14 plays, 48 yards, 7:18.

Fourth quarter

- PIT – Calvin Austin 7-yard pass from Mason Rudolph (Chris Boswell kick), 10:32. Bills 24–17. Drive: 12 plays, 75 yards, 6:00.
- BUF – Khalil Shakir 17-yard pass from Josh Allen (Tyler Bass kick), 6:27. Bills 31–17. Drive: 7 plays, 70 yards, 4:05.

Top passers

- PIT – Mason Rudolph – 22/39, 229 yards, 2 TD, INT
- BUF – Josh Allen – 21/30, 203 yards, 3 TD

Top rushers

- PIT – Jaylen Warren – 8 rushes, 38 yards
- BUF – James Cook – 18 rushes, 79 yards

Top receivers

- PIT – Pat Freiermuth – 5 receptions, 76 yards
- BUF – Dalton Kincaid – 3 receptions, 59 yards, TD

This was the fourth playoff matchup between these two teams; Pittsburgh won two out of the first three. The most recent playoff meeting occurred during the Divisional Round of the 1995–96 postseason, which Pittsburgh won 40–21. The Steelers and Bills did not meet during the regular season. The game was originally scheduled to be played on January 14 at 1:05 p.m. EST, but was delayed due to a state of emergency and travel ban declared in Western New York as a result of a massive snowstorm, marking the first time an NFL playoff game was postponed since the 2016–17 playoffs, a game that also featured the Steelers.

The first half was dominated by Buffalo, with a Josh Allen throwing a touchdown pass to Dawson Knox on Buffalo's first drive of the game. Later in the quarter, a reception by George Pickens was turned into a fumble by Taron Johnson that saw Terrel Bernard recover the ball at the 29-yard line of Buffalo. Allen soon threw a touchdown pass to Dalton Kincaid to give Buffalo a 14–0 lead. After Pittsburgh went 88 yards only to have the ball intercepted in the endzone, the Bills drove down the field and capitalized on a 52-yard run by Allen for a touchdown to increase the lead to 21–0 (the run was a career-long for Allen and the second longest run by a quarterback in a playoff game next to Colin Kaepernick's 56-yard run in the 2013 postseason). Pittsburgh finally got on the board with a short field after blocking a field goal and returning it to the 33-yard line, with Rudolph throwing a touchdown pass to Diontae Johnson to make it 21–7 at the half.

The teams traded field goals in the third quarter before Pittsburgh went on a 75-yard drive that saw them close it with a Rudolph touchdown pass to Calvin Austin to narrow the lead to 24-17 with 10:32 remaining. Buffalo responded with a 70-yard drive that lasted four minutes and finished with a Khalil Shakir touchdown reception and scramble to make the score 31-17 with six minutes remaining; neither team scored from that point on as Buffalo won their fourth straight Wild Card Round game.

==== NFC: Tampa Bay Buccaneers 32, Philadelphia Eagles 9 ====
Philadelphia Eagles vs. Tampa Bay Buccaneers – Game summary

Quarter	1	2	3	4	Total
Eagles	0	9	0	0	9
Buccaneers	10	6	9	7	32

at Raymond James Stadium, Tampa, Florida

- Date: January 15, 2024
- Game time: 8:15 p.m. EST
- Game weather: Cloudy, 67 °F (19 °C)
- Game attendance: 63,397
- Referee: Adrian Hill
- TV announcers (ABC/ESPN/ESPN2/ESPN+): Joe Buck, Troy Aikman, Lisa Salters, and Laura Rutledge
- Recap, Game Book

Game information

First quarter

- TB – Chase McLaughlin 28-yard field goal, 10:02. Buccaneers 3–0. Drive: 12 plays, 65 yards, 4:58.
- TB – David Moore 44-yard pass from Baker Mayfield (Chase McLaughlin kick), 5:47. Buccaneers 10–0. Drive: 4 plays, 79 yards, 1:20.

Second quarter

- TB – Chase McLaughlin 54-yard field goal, 14:03. Buccaneers 13–0. Drive: 10 plays, 40 yards, 5:19.
- PHI – Jake Elliott 47-yard field goal, 11:31. Buccaneers 13–3. Drive: 7 plays, 45 yards, 2:32.
- TB – Chase McLaughlin 48-yard field goal, 5:35. Buccaneers 16–3. Drive: 15 plays, 45 yards, 5:56.
- PHI – Dallas Goedert 5-yard pass from Jalen Hurts (two-point conversion failed), 3:06. Buccaneers 16–9. Drive: 5 plays, 75 yards, 2:29.

Third quarter

- TB – Jalen Hurts intentional grounding in endzone resulting in TB safety, 2:16. Buccaneers 18–9.
- TB – Trey Palmer 56-yard pass from Baker Mayfield (Chase McLaughlin kick), 1:19. Buccaneers 25–9. Drive: 2 plays, 62 yards, 0:59.

Fourth quarter

- TB – Chris Godwin 23-yard pass from Baker Mayfield (Chase McLaughlin kick), 5:42. Buccaneers 32–9. Drive: 12 plays, 83 yards, 6:15.

Top passers

- PHI – Jalen Hurts – 25/35, 250 yards, TD
- TB – Baker Mayfield – 22/36, 337 yards, 3 TD

Top rushers

- PHI – D'Andre Swift – 10 rushes, 34 yards
- TB – Rachaad White – 18 rushes, 72 yards

Top receivers

- PHI – DeVonta Smith – 8 receptions, 148 yards
- TB – Cade Otton – 8 receptions, 89 yards

This was the sixth postseason meeting between the Eagles and Buccaneers, with the Buccaneers winning three of the previous five. The most recent postseason meeting between two teams came in the 2021 NFC Wild Card Game, which the Buccaneers won 31–15 in Tampa. In the regular season, the Eagles defeated the Buccaneers in Tampa by a score of 25–11 during Week 3. This would end up being Jason Kelce's final game before his retirement a month later.

The Buccaneers made the only scoring plays in the first quarter, off a Chase McLaughlin field goal and David Moore touchdown for 10 unanswered points. The Buccaneers and Eagles traded field goals in the second quarter, after which Dallas Goedert scored a touchdown for Philadelphia. The Eagles attempted a two-point conversion using their signature "tush push", but the Buccaneers were able to pull them away. Tampa Bay's defense prevented the Eagles from scoring for the rest of the game, with the Buccaneers scoring two times in the third quarter off a safety on Jalen Hurts and a touchdown from Trey Palmer, in which the Eagles' poor tackling efforts facilitated his 56-yard run to the end zone. Chris Godwin scored a touchdown for Tampa Bay in the fourth quarter as the Buccaneers completed their 23-point blowout of the defending NFC Champions.

== Divisional round ==
This was the first time that a team seeded below No. 2 (in this case, the No. 3 Detroit Lions) has hosted a divisional playoff game.

=== Saturday, January 20, 2024 ===
==== AFC: Baltimore Ravens 34, Houston Texans 10 ====
Houston Texans vs. Baltimore Ravens – Game summary

Quarter	1	2	3	4	Total
Texans	3	7	0	0	10
Ravens	3	7	7	17	34

at M&T Bank Stadium, Baltimore, Maryland

- Date: January 20, 2024
- Game time: 4:35 p.m. EST
- Game weather: Clear, 27 °F (−3 °C)
- Game attendance: 71,018
- Referee: John Hussey
- TV announcers (ABC/ESPN/ESPN+): Joe Buck, Troy Aikman, Lisa Salters, and Laura Rutledge
- Recap, Game Book

Game information

First quarter

- BAL – Justin Tucker 53-yard field goal, 8:36. Ravens 3–0. Drive: 9 plays, 41 yards, 4:55.
- HOU – Kaʻimi Fairbairn 50-yard field goal, 0:28. Tied 3–3. Drive: 8 plays, 23 yards, 2:54.

Second quarter

- BAL – Nelson Agholor 3-yard pass from Lamar Jackson (Justin Tucker kick), 9:14. Ravens 10–3. Drive: 11 plays, 76 yards, 6:14.
- HOU – Steven Sims 67-yard punt return (Kaʻimi Fairbairn kick), 4:17. Tied 10–10.

Third quarter

- BAL – Lamar Jackson 15-yard run (Justin Tucker kick), 12:04. Ravens 17–10. Drive: 6 plays, 55 yards, 2:56.

Fourth quarter

- BAL – Isaiah Likely 15-yard pass from Lamar Jackson (Justin Tucker kick), 14:23. Ravens 24–10. Drive: 12 plays, 93 yards, 7:03.
- BAL – Lamar Jackson 8-yard run (Justin Tucker kick), 6:02. Ravens 31–10. Drive: 11 plays, 78 yards, 7:10.
- BAL – Justin Tucker 43-yard field goal, 1:56. Ravens 34–10. Drive: 8 plays, 8 yards, 3:08.

Top passers

- HOU – C. J. Stroud – 19/33, 175 yards
- BAL – Lamar Jackson – 16/22, 152 yards, 2 TD

Top rushers

- HOU – Devin Singletary – 9 rushes, 22 yards
- BAL – Lamar Jackson – 11 rushes, 100 yards, 2 TD

Top receivers

- HOU – Nico Collins – 5 receptions, 68 yards
- BAL – Zay Flowers – 4 receptions, 41 yards

This was the second postseason meeting between the Ravens and Texans. The Ravens won the first matchup, the 2011 AFC Divisional Game, by a score of 20–13 in Baltimore. In the regular season, the Ravens defeated the Texans by a score of 25–9 in Baltimore in Week 1. Despite a ragged offensive start in the first half, the Ravens outscored the Texans 24–0 in the second half and advanced to their first AFC Championship game since 2012 with a 34–10 rout.

Though not getting a takeaway nor recording a sack on rookie quarterback C. J. Stroud, the Ravens defense dominated Houston. They did not allow any offensive plays by Houston inside the Ravens' 25 yard line nor gave up an offensive touchdown. Houston's only points came by a field goal and a punt return touchdown in the first half. The Baltimore crowd noise also caused a litany of Houston pre-snap penalties.

Lamar Jackson had two passing touchdowns and two rushing touchdowns as he improved to 2–3 in playoff games and 1–2 in home playoff games. This was also the Ravens' first home playoff win since the 2012 AFC Wild Card round.

==== NFC: San Francisco 49ers 24, Green Bay Packers 21 ====
Green Bay Packers vs. San Francisco 49ers – Game summary

Quarter	1	2	3	4	Total
Packers	3	3	15	0	21
49ers	0	7	7	10	24

at Levi's Stadium, Santa Clara, California

- Date: January 20, 2024
- Game time: 8:15 p.m. EST/5:15 p.m. PST
- Game weather: Rain, 59 °F (15 °C)
- Game attendance: 71,824
- Referee: Alex Kemp
- TV announcers (Fox): Kevin Burkhardt, Greg Olsen, Erin Andrews, and Tom Rinaldi
- Recap, Game Book

Game information

First quarter

- GB – Anders Carlson 29-yard field goal, 7:22. Packers 3–0. Drive: 14 plays, 58 yards, 7:38.

Second quarter

- SF – George Kittle 30-yard pass from Brock Purdy (Jake Moody kick), 8:42. 49ers 7–3. Drive: 12 plays, 86 yards, 5:48.
- GB – Anders Carlson 29-yard field goal, 4:09. 49ers 7–6. Drive: 10 plays, 64 yards, 4:33.

Third quarter

- GB – Bo Melton 19-yard pass from Jordan Love (Anders Carlson kick), 9:27. Packers 13–7. Drive: 9 plays, 75 yards, 4:01.
- SF – Christian McCaffrey 39-yard run (Jake Moody kick), 7:39. 49ers 14–13. Drive: 4 plays, 75 yards, 1:48.
- GB – Tucker Kraft 2-yard pass from Jordan Love (Aaron Jones pass from Jordan Love), 5:23. Packers 21–14. Drive: 4 plays, 20 yards, 2:16.

Fourth quarter

- SF – Jake Moody 52-yard field goal, 14:56. Packers 21–17. Drive: 7 plays, 14 yards, 2:06.
- SF – Christian McCaffrey 6-yard run (Jake Moody kick), 1:07. 49ers 24–21. Drive: 12 plays, 69 yards, 5:11.

Top passers

- GB – Jordan Love – 21/34, 194 yards, 2 TD, 2 INT
- SF – Brock Purdy – 23/39, 252 yards, TD

Top rushers

- GB – Aaron Jones – 18 rushes, 108 yards
- SF – Christian McCaffrey – 17 rushes, 98 yards, 2 TD

Top receivers

- GB – Romeo Doubs – 4 receptions, 83 yards
- SF – George Kittle – 4 receptions, 81 yards, TD

After losing Deebo Samuel to injury early in the first quarter, the 49ers narrowly edged out the Packers 24–21.

The Packers trailed the 49ers 7–6 at halftime. However, in the third quarter, the Packers benefited off a 41-yard pass interference penalty on Ambry Thomas and a 73-yard kickoff return from Keisean Nixon, leading to two touchdowns and a successful two-point conversion to take a 21–14 lead heading into the fourth quarter. Following a field goal from Jake Moody, Anders Carlson missed a 41-yard field goal with six minutes left in the game, and the 49ers were able to capitalize on the opportunity as Brock Purdy led his team on a game-winning drive. Although he had a sluggish performance throughout the game, Purdy completed 6-of-7 passes on the drive before Christian McCaffrey delivered the game-winning touchdown. With a minute left on the clock, Jordan Love attempted a final drive but was intercepted by Dre Greenlaw to seal the 49ers' third consecutive NFC Championship Game appearance (and their fourth in the last five seasons). Greenlaw caught Love's two interceptions of the night.

The 49ers got their first win when they entered the fourth quarter trailing by five points or more under head coach Kyle Shanahan.

This was the tenth postseason meeting in the rivalry between the Packers and 49ers, an NFL record for the most playoff matches between two teams. The most recent postseason matchup came in the 2021 NFC Divisional Game, which the 49ers won 13–10 in Green Bay. The 49ers and Packers did not meet in the regular season. Additionally, this was also the first-ever 1 seed v 7 seed playoff matchup in NFL history.

=== Sunday, January 21, 2024 ===
==== NFC: Detroit Lions 31, Tampa Bay Buccaneers 23 ====
Tampa Bay Buccaneers vs. Detroit Lions – Game summary

Quarter	1	2	3	4	Total
Buccaneers	3	7	7	6	23
Lions	3	7	7	14	31

at Ford Field, Detroit, Michigan

- Date: January 21, 2024
- Game time: 3:05 p.m. EST
- Game weather: None (indoor stadium)
- Game attendance: 66,201
- Referee: Bill Vinovich
- TV announcers (NBC/Peacock): Mike Tirico, Cris Collinsworth, Melissa Stark, and Kaylee Hartung
- Recap, Game Book

Game information

First quarter

- DET – Michael Badgley 23-yard field goal, 8:25. Lions 3–0. Drive: 8 plays, 37 yards, 2:43.
- TB – Chase McLaughlin 43-yard field goal, 4:19. Tied 3–3. Drive: 8 plays, 50 yards, 4:06.

Second quarter

- DET – Josh Reynolds 9-yard pass from Jared Goff (Michael Badgley kick), 12:33. Lions 10–3. Drive: 14 plays, 75 yards, 6:46.
- TB – Cade Otton 2-yard pass from Baker Mayfield (Chase McLaughlin kick), 0:15. Tied 10–10. Drive: 7 plays, 92 yards, 1:13.

Third quarter

- DET – Craig Reynolds 1-yard run (Michael Badgley kick), 3:48. Lions 17–10. Drive: 10 plays, 64 yards, 4:25.
- TB – Rachaad White 12-yard pass from Baker Mayfield (Chase McLaughlin kick), 0:10. Tied 17–17. Drive: 7 plays, 75 yards, 3:38.

Fourth quarter

- DET – Jahmyr Gibbs 31-yard run (Michael Badgley kick), 13:13. Lions 24–17. Drive: 5 plays, 75 yards, 1:57.
- DET – Amon-Ra St. Brown 9-yard pass from Jared Goff (Michael Badgley kick), 6:22. Lions 31–17. Drive: 10 plays, 89 yards, 6:22.
- TB – Mike Evans 16-yard pass from Baker Mayfield (two-point conversion failed), 4:37. Lions 31–23. Drive: 9 plays, 75 yards, 1:45.

Top passers

- TB – Baker Mayfield – 26/41, 349 yards, 3 TD, 2 INT
- DET – Jared Goff – 30/43, 287 yards, 2 TD

Top rushers

- TB – Rachaad White – 9 rushes, 55 yards
- DET – Jahmyr Gibbs – 9 rushes, 74 yards, TD

Top receivers

- TB – Mike Evans – 8 receptions, 141 yards, TD
- DET – Amon-Ra St. Brown – 8 receptions, 77 yards, TD

This was the second postseason meeting between the Buccaneers and Lions. The Buccaneers won the first meeting, which came in the 1997 NFC Wild Card Game, by a score of 20–10 at Houlihan's Stadium in Tampa. In the regular season, the Lions won the meeting between the two teams by a score of 20–6 in Week 6 in Tampa. After a mostly back-and-forth affair through the first three quarters, Detroit built up to a 31–17 late in the fourth quarter. However, after a Buccaneers touchdown and defensive stop, the Buccaneers had the ball while down by eight points. However, Derrick Barnes intercepted Mayfield with 1:39 remaining to seal a Lions victory. The Lions advanced to the NFC Championship Game for the first time since 1991. This marked the first time since 1957 that the Lions won two playoff games in a season. For the second week in a row, the crowd broke a decibel record at Ford Field.

==== AFC: Kansas City Chiefs 27, Buffalo Bills 24 ====
Kansas City Chiefs vs. Buffalo Bills – Game summary

Quarter	1	2	3	4	Total
Chiefs	3	10	7	7	27
Bills	3	14	7	0	24

at Highmark Stadium, Orchard Park, New York

- Date: January 21, 2024
- Game time: 6:40 p.m. EST
- Game weather: Cloudy, 25 °F (−4 °C)
- Game attendance: 70,808
- Referee: Shawn Hochuli
- TV announcers (CBS/Paramount+): Jim Nantz, Tony Romo, Tracy Wolfson, and Jay Feely
- Recap, Game Book

Game information

First quarter

- BUF – Tyler Bass 27-yard field goal, 8:08. Bills 3–0. Drive: 14 plays, 60 yards, 6:52.
- KC – Harrison Butker 47-yard field goal, 4:35. Tied 3–3. Drive: 7 plays, 46 yards, 3:33.

Second quarter

- BUF – Josh Allen 5-yard run (Tyler Bass kick), 13:32. Bills 10–3. Drive: 11 plays, 75 yards, 6:03.
- KC – Harrison Butker 29-yard field goal, 9:12. Bills 10–6. Drive: 10 plays, 64 yards, 4:20.
- KC – Travis Kelce 22-yard pass from Patrick Mahomes (Harrison Butker kick), 3:33. Chiefs 13–10. Drive: 5 plays, 65 yards, 2:34.
- BUF – Josh Allen 2-yard run (Tyler Bass kick), 0:26. Bills 17–13. Drive: 12 plays, 75 yards, 3:07.

Third quarter

- KC – Travis Kelce 2-yard pass from Patrick Mahomes (Harrison Butker kick), 11:48. Chiefs 20–17. Drive: 6 plays, 75 yards, 3:12.
- BUF – Khalil Shakir 13-yard pass from Josh Allen (Tyler Bass kick), 3:22. Bills 24–20. Drive: 15 plays, 75 yards, 8:25.

Fourth quarter

- KC – Isiah Pacheco 4-yard run (Harrison Butker kick), 14:20. Chiefs 27–24. Drive: 8 plays, 75 yards, 4:03.

Top passers

- KC – Patrick Mahomes – 17/23, 215 yards, 2 TD
- BUF – Josh Allen – 26/39, 186 yards, TD

Top rushers

- KC – Isiah Pacheco – 15 rushes, 97 yards, TD
- BUF – Josh Allen – 12 rushes, 72 yards, 2 TD

Top receivers

- KC – Travis Kelce – 5 receptions, 75 yards, 2 TD
- BUF – Dalton Kincaid – 5 receptions, 45 yards

This was the sixth postseason meeting in the rivalry between the Bills and Chiefs. The Chiefs lead the postseason series 4–2 against the Bills. The last meeting between the two came in the 2021 AFC Divisional Game, which the Chiefs won 42–36 in overtime in Kansas City after the Chiefs offense drove down the field in the final 13 seconds of regulation to score the game–tying field goal. In the regular season, the Bills defeated the Chiefs 20–17 in Kansas City during Week 14.

The game was the most-viewed divisional round playoff game in NFL history, averaging 50.4 million viewers and peaking at 56.3 million viewers, breaking the previous record of 48.5 million average viewers from the Packers-Cowboys game in the 2016–17 NFL playoffs. The game was also the most-streamed event in Paramount+ history.

The Bills got the ball first and got on the board with a 27-yard field goal by Tyler Bass to take an early 3–0 lead. On the very next drive, Harrison Butker would make a 47-yard field goal to tie the game at 3–3.

The Bills would respond with a 5-yard touchdown run by Josh Allen to take a 10–3 lead. The Chiefs cut their lead to 10–6 on a 29-yard field goal by Butker. The Bills were held to a punt on their next drive and the Chiefs took a 13–10 lead on a 22-yard pass to Travis Kelce by Patrick Mahomes. The Bills would answer with a 2-yard touchdown pass by Allen near the end of the half to take a 17–13 lead into halftime.

The Chiefs received the second half kickoff and drove down the field, culminating in a 3-yard pass from Mahomes to Kelce to take a 20–17 lead. The Bills answered with a touchdown drive of their own culminating in a 13-yard touchdown pass from Allen to Khalil Shakir and retake a 24–20 lead.

The Chiefs responded on their next drive and took a 27–24 lead courtesy of a 4-yard touchdown run by Isiah Pacheco. On their next drive, the Bills attempted a fake punt and failed, giving the Chiefs the ball in Bills territory. Pacheco rattled off a 29-yard run to get to the 3-yard line. On the next play, Mahomes completed a pass to Mecole Hardman in which he was initially ruled to be down at the 1-yard line before losing the ball. The Bills challenged the ruling and the call was overturned to a fumble into the end zone, giving them the ball back. The Bills and Chiefs then both traded punts on three-and-out drives. After the Bills got the ball back, on a 54-yard drive that included a fourth down conversion, they advanced the ball to the Chiefs' 26-yard line.

Following two incompletions, the Bills faced fourth down at the Chiefs' 26-yard line, leading them to bring out Bass to attempt a 44-yard field goal kick to tie the game.

The kick had the distance, but missed to the right of the goalpost, making the kick no good and giving the Chiefs the ball back. Commentator Jim Nantz remarked "Wide Right; The two most dreaded words in Buffalo have surfaced again." in reaction to the miss and comparing it to Norwood's miss. The Bills then attempted to stop the Chiefs, but the Chiefs were able to run out the clock after picking up a first down, sealing a 27–24 win for the Chiefs.

The miss has been dubbed Wide Right II. Due to Taylor Swift's affiliation with the Chiefs from dating (and later marrying) Chiefs tight end Travis Kelce, the miss has also been referred to as Wide Right (Tyler's Version).

The Bills were eliminated by the Chiefs in the playoffs for the third time in four seasons, and were eliminated in the divisional round for the third straight season, two of which were by the Chiefs.

Bills kicker Bass received a large amount of social media threats following the miss and subsequent playoff elimination, driving him to deactivate his social media accounts. Some Bills fans donated to Ten Lives Club, a no-kill cat shelter he was the brand ambassador for, leading to them receiving $100K in reported donations. Bills quarterback Allen defended Bass, saying the team should not have ever been in that situation and the offense should have executed plays to not bring up the fourth down in which Bass missed.

== Conference championships ==
Per an annual rotation used by the NFL since 1997 and made official in 2002, the AFC Championship Game was the first game being played at 3:05 p.m. EST, followed by the NFC Championship Game at 6:40 p.m. EST.

=== Sunday, January 28, 2024 ===
==== AFC: Kansas City Chiefs 17, Baltimore Ravens 10 ====
Kansas City Chiefs vs. Baltimore Ravens – Game summary

Quarter	1	2	3	4	Total
Chiefs	7	10	0	0	17
Ravens	7	0	0	3	10

at M&T Bank Stadium, Baltimore, Maryland

- Date: January 28, 2024
- Game time: 3:05 p.m. EST
- Game weather: Cloudy, 47 °F (8 °C)
- Game attendance: 71,439
- Referee: Shawn Smith
- TV announcers (CBS/Paramount+): Jim Nantz, Tony Romo, Tracy Wolfson, Evan Washburn, and Jay Feely
- Recap, Game Book

Game information

First quarter

- KC – Travis Kelce 19-yard pass from Patrick Mahomes (Harrison Butker kick), 7:41. Chiefs 7–0. Drive: 10 plays, 86 yards, 5:45.
- BAL – Zay Flowers 30-yard pass from Lamar Jackson (Justin Tucker kick), 4:58. Tied 7–7. Drive: 6 plays, 75 yards, 2:43.

Second quarter

- KC – Isiah Pacheco 2-yard run (Harrison Butker kick), 10:56. Chiefs 14–7. Drive: 16 plays, 75 yards, 9:02.
- KC – Harrison Butker 52-yard field goal, 0:04. Chiefs 17–7. Drive: 8 plays, 55 yards, 1:42.

Third quarter

- No scoring plays.

Fourth quarter

- BAL – Justin Tucker 43-yard field goal, 2:34. Chiefs 17–10. Drive: 9 plays, 29 yards, 2:26.

Top passers

- KC – Patrick Mahomes – 30/39, 241 yards, TD
- BAL – Lamar Jackson – 20/37, 272 yards, TD, INT

Top rushers

- KC – Isiah Pacheco – 24 rushes, 68 yards, TD
- BAL – Lamar Jackson – 8 rushes, 54 yards

Top receivers

- KC – Travis Kelce – 11 receptions, 116 yards, TD
- BAL – Zay Flowers – 5 receptions, 115 yards, TD

This was the first time the Baltimore Ravens have hosted an AFC Championship Game in franchise history. Additionally, this was the first AFC Championship since 2017 not hosted by the Kansas City Chiefs. This is also the sixth straight AFC Championship Game appearance for the Chiefs.

This was also the second postseason meeting between the Chiefs and Ravens. The first meeting came in the 2010 AFC Wild Card, which the Ravens won 30–7 in Kansas City. The two teams did not meet in the regular season.

Michael Phelps delivered the game ball.

The Chiefs attained a 17–7 lead at halftime off two touchdowns, one from Travis Kelce and one from Isiah Pacheco, as well as a 52-yard field goal from Harrison Butker, as the Ravens only managed one touchdown. At the end of a scoreless third quarter, Lamar Jackson threw a 54-yard pass to Zay Flowers, who was then called for a 15-yard penalty after taunting over L'Jarius Sneed. As the drive carried over into the fourth quarter, Flowers received a pass from Jackson near the end zone, but Sneed forced a fumble for a touchback. The next Ravens drive reached the red zone, but ended in an interception by Deon Bush as Jackson attempted a pass to a triple-covered Isaiah Likely.

This game averaged 55.5 million viewers with a peak of 64 million viewers becoming the most viewed AFC championship game in history, as well as the most watched non-Super Bowl CBS program since the 1994 Winter Olympics.

==== NFC: San Francisco 49ers 34, Detroit Lions 31 ====
Detroit Lions vs. San Francisco 49ers – Game summary

Quarter	1	2	3	4	Total
Lions	14	10	0	7	31
49ers	0	7	17	10	34

at Levi's Stadium, Santa Clara, California

- Date: January 28, 2024
- Game time: 6:40 p.m. EST/3:40 p.m. PST
- Game weather: Cloudy, 69 °F (21 °C)
- Game attendance: 71,824
- Referee: Clete Blakeman
- TV announcers (Fox): Kevin Burkhardt, Greg Olsen, Erin Andrews, and Tom Rinaldi
- Recap, Game Book

Game information

First quarter

- DET – Jameson Williams 42-yard run (Michael Badgley kick), 13:18. Lions 7–0. Drive: 4 plays, 75 yards, 1:42.
- DET – David Montgomery 1-yard run (Michael Badgley kick), 2:34. Lions 14–0. Drive: 11 plays, 62 yards, 5:20.

Second quarter

- SF – Christian McCaffrey 2-yard run (Jake Moody kick), 13:49. Lions 14–7. Drive: 8 plays, 75 yards, 3:45.
- DET – Jahmyr Gibbs 15-yard run (Michael Badgley kick), 5:54. Lions 21–7. Drive: 5 plays, 46 yards, 2:43.
- DET – Michael Badgley 21-yard field goal, 0:07. Lions 24–7. Drive: 17 plays, 68 yards, 4:52.

Third quarter

- SF – Jake Moody 43-yard field goal, 11:02. Lions 24–10. Drive: 9 plays, 50 yards, 3:58.
- SF – Brandon Aiyuk 6-yard pass from Brock Purdy (Jake Moody kick), 5:17. Lions 24–17. Drive: 5 plays, 72 yards, 1:41.
- SF – Christian McCaffrey 1-yard run (Jake Moody kick), 3:02. Tied 24–24. Drive: 4 plays, 24 yards, 2:07.

Fourth quarter

- SF – Jake Moody 33-yard field goal, 9:52. 49ers 27–24. Drive: 11 plays, 65 yards, 7:09.
- SF – Elijah Mitchell 3-yard run (Jake Moody kick), 3:02. 49ers 34–24. Drive: 7 plays, 70 yards, 4:30.
- DET – Jameson Williams 3-yard pass from Jared Goff (Michael Badgley kick), 0:56. 49ers 34–31. Drive: 11 plays, 75 yards, 2:06.

Top passers

- DET – Jared Goff – 25/41, 273 yards, TD
- SF – Brock Purdy – 20/31, 267 yards, TD, INT

Top rushers

- DET – David Montgomery – 15 rushes, 93 yards, TD
- SF – Christian McCaffrey – 20 rushes, 90 yards, 2 TD

Top receivers

- DET – Sam LaPorta – 9 receptions, 97 yards
- SF – Deebo Samuel – 8 receptions, 89 yards

This was the third postseason meeting between the 49ers and Lions. The postseason series had been split 1–1 between the two teams. The most recent postseason matchup between the two came in the 1983 NFC Divisional Round, which the 49ers won 24–23 at Candlestick Park in San Francisco. The 49ers and Lions did not meet in the regular season. This was the second NFC Championship appearance for the Lions and first since 1991, in which they lost to the Washington Redskins (coincidentally, this was Washington's most recent NFC Championship appearance at this point; they returned to the NFC Championship the following season.) This was the third straight season and fourth time in the last five seasons that the 49ers reached the NFC Championship Game.

The Lions started off with an explosive offensive push that saw them score a touchdown within the first two minutes of the game; they would score two more touchdowns and a field goal, as well as the defense forcing an interception on Purdy, to take a 24–7 lead at halftime. Although the 49ers only managed a Christian McCaffrey touchdown in the first half, they proceeded to score 27 unanswered points off of huge plays: a 51-yard pass from Brock Purdy was recovered by Brandon Aiyuk as it deflected off Kindle Vildor's helmet on a touchdown drive, which was immediately followed by a fumble recovery off of Jahmyr Gibbs that the 49ers converted into another touchdown drive. They also benefitted from two turnovers on downs when the Lions were in field goal range both times. Midway through the third quarter, Josh Reynolds dropped a pass on 4th-and-2 at the San Francisco 28-yard line. Then in the fourth quarter, the Lions unsuccessfully attempted a fourth down conversion instead of going for a field goal, and both turnovers on downs, plus the fumble by Gibbs, proved costly as the Lions would ultimately lose by a field goal. Both the 49ers and Lions got touchdowns after that point, but the Lions onside kick attempt with 56 seconds left was unsuccessful, allowing the 49ers to win. After the game, Lions head coach Dan Campbell was criticized for his aggressive fourth down play calls, but he defended his decisions.

The 24–7 halftime lead blown by the Lions mirrors a 49ers' 24–7 halftime blown lead in the 1957 NFL Western Conference Championship game against the Lions, who later went on to win the 1957 NFL Championship Game against the Browns. The Lions’ collapse in the NFC Championship entered football lore as part of the Curse of Bobby Layne superstition used to explain the Lions' championship drought since 1957. In addition, the 17-point comeback tied for the largest comeback in NFC Championship history.

== Super Bowl LVIII: Kansas City Chiefs 25, San Francisco 49ers 22 (OT) ==
Super Bowl LVIII – San Francisco 49ers vs. Kansas City Chiefs – Game summary

Quarter	1	2	3	4	OT	Total
49ers	0	10	0	9	3	22
Chiefs	0	3	10	6	6	25

at Allegiant Stadium, Paradise, Nevada (Note: Super Bowl LVIII was originally scheduled to be played at the Mercedes-Benz Superdome in New Orleans, Louisiana.)

- Date: February 11, 2024
- Game time: 6:40 p.m. EST/3:40 p.m. PST
- Game weather: None (indoor stadium)
- Game attendance: 61,629
- Referee: Bill Vinovich
- TV announcers (CBS/Paramount+—traditional broadcast, Nickelodeon—kids broadcast):
  CBS/Paramount+:
  Jim Nantz, Tony Romo, Tracy Wolfson, Evan Washburn, and Jay Feely
  Nickelodeon:
  Noah Eagle, Nate Burleson, SpongeBob SquarePants, (Note: Voiced by Tom Kenny) Patrick Star, (Note: Voiced by Bill Fagerbakke) Sandy Cheeks, (Note: Voiced by Carolyn Lawrence) Dylan Gilmer, and Dylan Schefter
- Recap, Game Book

Game information

First quarter

- No scoring plays.

Second quarter

- SF – Jake Moody 55-yard field goal, 14:48. 49ers 3–0. Drive: 10 plays, 46 yards, 4:05.
- SF – Christian McCaffrey 21-yard pass from Jauan Jennings (Jake Moody kick), 4:23. 49ers 10–0. Drive: 8 plays, 67 yards, 3:26.
- KC – Harrison Butker 28-yard field goal, 0:20. 49ers 10–3. Drive: 13 plays, 65 yards, 4:03.

Third quarter

- KC – Harrison Butker 57-yard field goal, 5:01. 49ers 10–6. Drive: 9 plays, 47 yards, 4:01.
- KC – Marquez Valdes-Scantling 16-yard pass from Patrick Mahomes (Harrison Butker kick), 2:28. Chiefs 13–10. Drive: 1 play, 16 yards, 0:04.

Fourth quarter

- SF – Jauan Jennings 10-yard pass from Brock Purdy (kick blocked), 11:22. 49ers 16–13. Drive: 12 plays, 75 yards, 6:06.
- KC – Harrison Butker 24-yard field goal, 5:46. Tied 16–16. Drive: 12 plays, 69 yards, 5:36.
- SF – Jake Moody 53-yard field goal, 1:53. 49ers 19–16. Drive: 7 plays, 40 yards, 3:53.
- KC – Harrison Butker 29-yard field goal, 0:03. Tied 19–19. Drive: 11 plays, 64 yards, 1:50.

Overtime

- SF – Jake Moody 27-yard field goal, 7:22. 49ers 22–19. Drive: 13 plays, 66 yards, 7:38.
- KC – Mecole Hardman 3-yard pass from Patrick Mahomes, 0:03. Chiefs 25–22. Drive: 13 plays, 75 yards, 7:19.

Top passers

- SF – Brock Purdy – 23/38, 255 yards, TD
- KC – Patrick Mahomes – 34/46, 333 yards, 2 TD, INT

Top rushers

- SF – Christian McCaffrey – 22 rushes, 80 yards
- KC – Patrick Mahomes – 9 rushes, 66 yards

Top receivers

- SF – Christian McCaffrey – 8 receptions, 80 yards, TD
- KC – Travis Kelce – 9 receptions, 93 yards

This was the second meeting in the Super Bowl between the Chiefs and the 49ers. The Chiefs and 49ers previously met in Super Bowl LIV in 2019, which the Chiefs won 31–20 in Miami to win their first of two Super Bowls in the Andy Reid era and first overall since Super Bowl IV in 1969. The 49ers sought their first Super Bowl victory since 1994 and their sixth overall, which would have tied them for first with the Pittsburgh Steelers and New England Patriots. The Chiefs won the game in overtime with a pass from Patrick Mahomes to Mecole Hardman. The Chiefs became the first team to win consecutive Super Bowls since the Patriots did so in 2003 and 2004.

== Media coverage ==
=== United States ===
Three of the Wild Card games aired on NBC this postseason, which held the rights to the Saturday afternoon game under its annual rotation with CBS and Fox since 2020, the Sunday night game under the third year of a separate seven-year deal, and the Saturday night game, which was streamed exclusively by Peacock under a one-year deal. Peacock's game was sold on a stand-alone basis, as the league separated it from the broader television rights deals that began this season. This marked the first time that an NFL playoff game was exclusively carried nationally by a streaming platform. ESPN entered its third year of their five-year deal for the Monday night Wild Card game, which was simulcast on ABC and the Manningcast alternative telecast on ESPN2. The remaining two afternoon games were carried by CBS and Fox.

Under the new television deals, the four broadcast television partners now each aired one Divisional Playoff game per season, with ESPN/ABC took over that slot that was previously rotated between CBS and Fox. CBS and Fox retained the exclusive rights to broadcast the AFC and NFC Championship Games, respectively.

CBS televised Super Bowl LVIII this season, to be followed by Fox, NBC, and ESPN/ABC under a new annual Super Bowl rotation. Nickelodeon also had a youth-friendly broadcast of the game. CBS also has sub-licensed the Spanish-language rights for Super Bowl LVIII to TelevisaUnivision, replacing ESPN Deportes, who held the agreement for the three previous Super Bowl games aired by CBS.

In addition to having exclusive coverage of the Saturday night Wild Card game, Peacock also streamed NBC's other games. All of CBS' games streamed on Paramount+, and all ESPN/ABC's games streamed on ESPN+. The league's streaming service NFL+ streamed every postseason game on mobile devices only, regardless of broadcaster.

=== International coverage ===
Prior the 2023 season, DAZN signed a ten-year agreement to distribute the NFL Game Pass International service, which offered live NFL playoff games. In select countries, the NFL has also signed local media rights deals as follows:

- Australia: ESPN
- Bosnia and Herzegovina, Croatia, Montenegro, North Macedonia, Serbia, Slovenia: Arena Sport
- Canada: TSN/CTV
- Denmark: TV 2
- Finland/Sweden: TV4
- France: beIN Sports, W9
- Germany: RTL
- Japan: Nippon TV
- Mexico: Canal 5, ESPN/Star+, Fox Sports
- New Zealand: TVNZ
- Norway: VGTV
- South Korea: Coupang Play
- Spain: Movistar Deportes
- Taiwan: ELTA Sports
- United Kingdom: Sky Sports
