= Super Bowl LVII =

2023 National Football League championship game

Kansas City Chiefs (1) (AFC) (14–3)	Philadelphia Eagles (1) (NFC) (14–3)
38	35
Head coach: Andy Reid	Head coach: Nick Sirianni
	1	2	3	4	Total
KC	7	7	7	17	38
PHI	7	17	3	8	35
- Date: February 12, 2023
- Kickoff time: 4:43 p.m. MST (UTC-7)
- Stadium: State Farm Stadium; Glendale, Arizona
- MVP: Patrick Mahomes, quarterback
- Favorite: Eagles by 1.5
- Referee: Carl Cheffers
- Attendance: 67,827

Ceremonies
- National anthem: Chris Stapleton
- Coin toss: Pat Tillman Foundation scholar Fabersha Flynt
- Halftime show: Rihanna

TV in the United States
- Network: Fox; Fox Deportes; NFL.com; NFL+
- Announcers: Kevin Burkhardt (play-by-play); Greg Olsen (analyst); Erin Andrews and Tom Rinaldi (sideline reporters); Mike Pereira (rules analyst)
- Nielsen ratings: 40.0 (national); 52.0 (Kansas City); 46.3 (Philadelphia); 39.5 (Phoenix); U.S. TV viewership: 115.1 million
- Market share: 77 (national); 87 (Kansas City); 77 (Philadelphia); 76 (Phoenix)
- Cost of 30-second commercial: $7 million

Radio in the United States
- Network: Westwood One
- Announcers: Kevin Harlan (play-by-play); Kurt Warner (analyst); Laura Okmin and Mike Golic (sideline reporters); Gene Steratore (rules analyst)

Super Bowl LVII was an American football game played to determine the champion of the National Football League (NFL) for the 2022 season. The American Football Conference (AFC) champion Kansas City Chiefs defeated the National Football Conference (NFC) champion Philadelphia Eagles, 38–35. The game was played on February 12, 2023, at State Farm Stadium in Glendale, Arizona. It was the fourth Super Bowl hosted by the Phoenix metropolitan area, and the third at this venue, after Super Bowls XLII in 2008 and XLIX in 2015 when it was known as University of Phoenix Stadium.

Both teams finished the regular season with a league-best 14–3 record. This was the Eagles' fourth Super Bowl appearance, having previously won Super Bowl LII and lost Super Bowls XV and XXXIX. This was the Chiefs' fifth Super Bowl appearance overall and third in the last four seasons, having previously won Super Bowls IV and LIV and lost Super Bowls I and LV.

The Chiefs won the game 38–35 on a game-winning field goal by Harrison Butker. Butker's game-winning kick was set up by a controversial defensive holding call on Philadelphia cornerback James Bradberry, which was criticized by some observers but supported by others, including Bradberry himself. The 73 combined points made this the third-highest scoring Super Bowl game, and the 35 points scored by the Eagles were the most by the losing team in the Super Bowl. Chiefs quarterback Patrick Mahomes was named Super Bowl Most Valuable Player (MVP), completing 21 of 27 passes for 182 yards and three touchdowns. The three touchdowns and two-point conversion scored by Jalen Hurts tied the record for most points scored by a player in a Super Bowl with 20. The game was remembered for the use of signature plays on both sides, with the Chiefs scoring two touchdowns on plays using the Corn Dog misdirection route and the Eagles scoring twice using the Tush Push.

Fox's broadcast of the game became the most-watched program in American television history at the time, with an average of 115.1 million viewers. The halftime show, headlined by Rihanna, peaked at 121 million viewers. This record would later be broken the following year.

This was the last Super Bowl that George Toma would serve as groundskeeper for, having previously served as groundskeeper for every Super Bowl since the event's creation. The field conditions were criticized by players, particularly for slipperiness.

Kansas City and Philadelphia would meet for a rematch two years later in Super Bowl LIX, in which the Eagles avenged their loss against the Chiefs, 40–22. The victory secured their second Super Bowl title, after Super Bowl LII seven years prior.

== Background ==
=== Host selection ===
Beginning with this Super Bowl, a new system was introduced to select Super Bowl hosting sites. Discarding the previous process that allowed cities to submit bids for the hosting rights, the league unilaterally chooses a single hosting site for each game. The chosen city then creates a proposal that is voted upon at the league's owners' meetings. Arizona was the first location chosen under this process; its proposal was accepted unanimously on May 23, 2018.

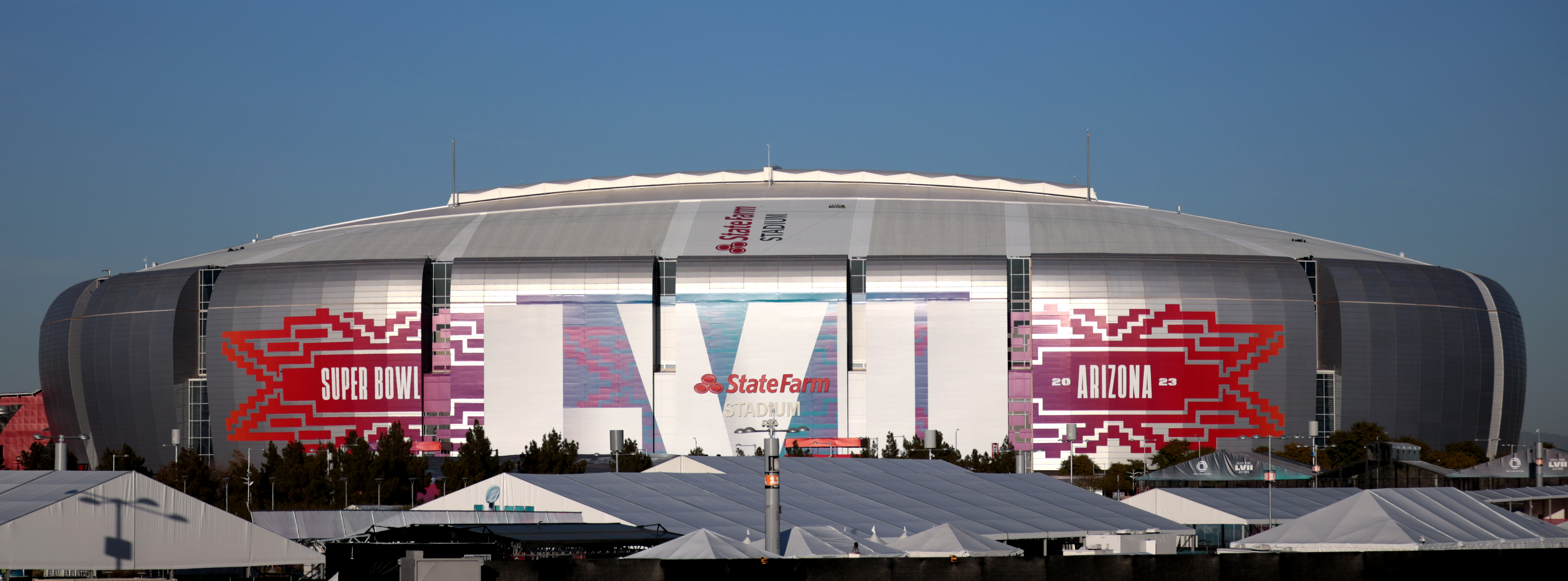
State Farm Stadium in February 2023, shortly before Super Bowl LVII

The official logo was unveiled on February 14, 2022; it follows the updated logo template introduced by Super Bowl LVI, with imagery of a sunset resembling Arizona's state flag behind a desert canyon to reflect the landscapes of the host region.

=== Calls for location change ===
In February 2022, over 200 liberal religious leaders, including Rev. Jesse Jackson and Rev. Dr. William Barber II, petitioned NFL Commissioner Roger Goodell to move Super Bowl LVII out of Arizona after they accused the Arizona legislature of enacting voting restrictions with HB 1003, SB 1485, and SB 1819. Arizona Democratic Party vice-chair Brianna Westbrook also voiced her support to move the Super Bowl after the Arizona legislature passed SB 1138 and SB 1165, which restricts access to gender-affirming care for minors and prevents transgender girls from playing on girls' sports teams.

=== Indigenous representation ===
The game and surrounding festivities included acknowledgements of the Indigenous peoples of Arizona; the Ak-Chin Indian Community, Fort McDowell Yavapai Nation, Gila River Indian Community, and Tohono O'odham Nation were named as Host Committee Partners, and the official branding for the game features artwork by Lucinda "La Morena" Hinojos, featuring the White Tank Mountains adorned with 22 diamonds representing the Native American tribes that have a presence in Arizona. This marked the first time an Indigenous artist was commissioned to create the official artwork for the Super Bowl. An 8,500 square feet (790 m^{2}) mural in downtown Phoenix was also commissioned in collaboration between Hinojos and other Indigenous artists.

For the first time, a land acknowledgment was read during a ceremony on February 6 attended by representatives of the Host Committee Partner tribes, while dance troupe Indigenous Enterprise performed during Super Bowl Opening Night, and as part of entertainment outside State Farm Stadium on the day of the game.

The presence of the Kansas City Chiefs led to continued calls against the use of Native American imagery by the team and its fans (including the "tomahawk chop"), including by the Kansas City Indian Center, the National Congress of American Indians, and the first Indigenous Secretary of the Interior Deb Haaland. Groups of Indigenous activists organized a protest rally outside State Farm Stadium.

=== Stadium playing surface ===
The NFL spent two years preparing the grass used in Super Bowl LVII. The field, made of Tahoma 31 grass, was grown at a local sod farm in Phoenix. Despite the field prep, multiple players could be seen slipping and falling on the surface. Players from both teams criticized the playing surface, and several players changed cleats during the game to get better traction. During their Week 1 matchup against the Arizona Cardinals, Chiefs players had complained of the playing surface at the time (it was replaced by February) which potentially led to injuries to Harrison Butker and Trent McDuffie.

== Teams ==
=== Kansas City Chiefs ===
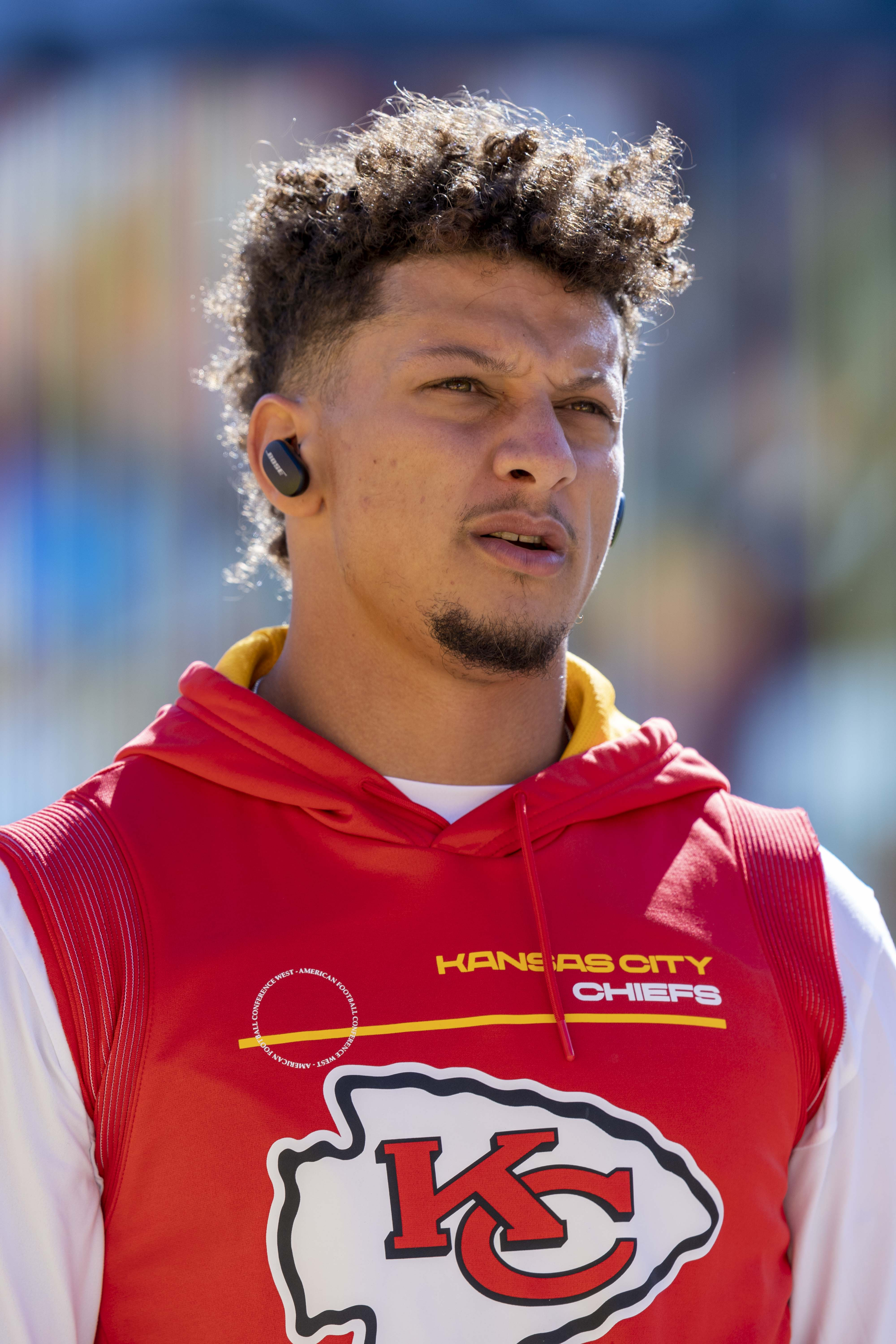
Patrick Mahomes became the first player to win the league MVP and the Super Bowl in the same year since 1999.

Kansas City finished the season with its tenth consecutive winning record under head coach Andy Reid, going 14–3 and advancing to their third Super Bowl in the last four years with one-score wins over the Jacksonville Jaguars (Divisional Round) and Cincinnati Bengals (AFC Championship Game).

The Chiefs traded star wide receiver Tyreek Hill to the Miami Dolphins in the offseason for draft picks but still finished the year as the NFL's best offense, leading the league in yards (7,032) and points scored (496). Quarterback Patrick Mahomes made his fifth consecutive Pro Bowl and won his second NFL Most Valuable Player award, leading the league with a career-high 5,250 passing yards and 41 touchdowns while throwing 12 interceptions. His passer rating of 105.2 was the second-highest in the league. He also rushed for 354 yards and four touchdowns, setting the NFL record for most combined passing and rushing yards in a season with 5,608. Pro Bowl tight end Travis Kelce was the team's leading receiver with 1,338 receiving yards and 12 touchdowns. The team also added in a pair of veteran receivers to help make up for the loss of Hill: JuJu Smith-Schuster (933 yards and three touchdowns) and Marquez Valdes-Scantling (687 yards and two touchdowns). The Chiefs' running game was led by rookie Isiah Pacheco, who had stepped into the leading role due to a midseason injury to starter Clyde Edwards-Helaire. Pacheco finished the season with 830 rushing yards and five touchdowns while also gaining 130 receiving yards and returning kickoffs with an average of 20.6 yards per return. Veteran running back Jerick McKinnon added 803 yards from scrimmage and 10 touchdowns. Their offensive line featured three Pro Bowl selections: guard Joe Thuney, tackle Orlando Brown Jr., and center Creed Humphrey. Punter Tommy Townsend also made the Pro Bowl, ranking second in the NFL in yards per punt (50.4) and leading the league with a 45.4 net average.

Kansas City's defensive line featured Pro Bowl defensive tackle Chris Jones, who led the team with 15.5 sacks, along with defensive ends George Karlaftis (6 sacks, seven pass deflections) and Frank Clark (5 sacks). Linebacker Nick Bolton led the team with 180 combined tackles and two interceptions. The secondary was led by cornerback L'Jarius Sneed (three interceptions, 108 tackles, three forced fumbles, 3.5 sacks) and safety Juan Thornhill (three interceptions, 71 tackles).

This was Kansas City's fifth Super Bowl, following wins in Super Bowls IV and LIV and losses in Super Bowls I and LV. Prior to the Super Bowl era, the Chiefs won the American Football League championship in 1962.

The Super Bowl was the final for Norma Hunt, the widow of the Chiefs' founder, Lamar Hunt, who died in June 2023. She was a member (and the only woman) of the Never Miss a Super Bowl Club. She was a minority owner of the Chiefs at the time of her death.

=== Philadelphia Eagles ===
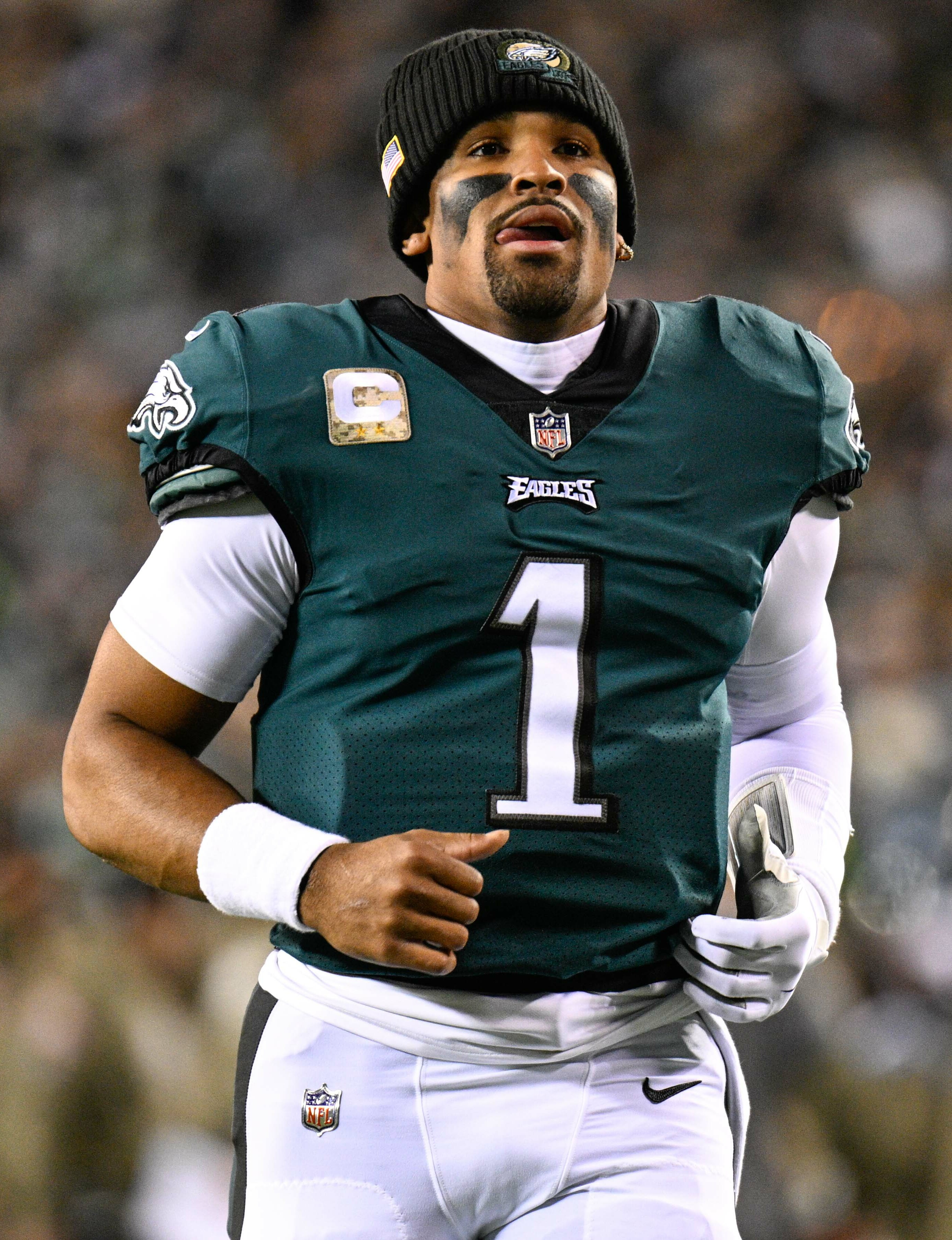
Winning 16 of his last 17 starts, Jalen Hurts became the eighth quarterback to start a Super Bowl before his 25th birthday and the youngest in Eagles history.

Under second-year head coach Nick Sirianni, the Eagles started the season winning eight consecutive games before finishing the season tied for an NFL-best 14–3 record and advancing to the Super Bowl by defeating their two playoff opponents (the New York Giants in the Divisional Round, and the San Francisco 49ers in the NFC Championship Game) by a combined score of 69–14. The team excelled on both sides of the ball, scoring 477 points (third most in the NFL) while only allowing 344 (eighth fewest) and sending an NFL-best eight players to the Pro Bowl.

Pro Bowl quarterback Jalen Hurts led the offense, setting career highs in his third season in completion percentage (66.5%), passing yards (3,701), and passing touchdowns (22) while throwing just six interceptions, giving a career-high 101.5 passer rating, the fourth-best in the NFL. Hurts also rushed for 736 yards and 13 touchdowns, the second-highest total in the league among quarterbacks. Pro Bowl receiver A. J. Brown, acquired from the Tennessee Titans in the off-season, posted 1,496 receiving yards and eleven touchdowns, while second-year receiver DeVonta Smith added 1,196 yards and seven scores. Tight end Dallas Goedert was another reliable target with 702 yards and three touchdowns. Pro Bowl running back Miles Sanders ranked fifth in the NFL with 1,269 yards and eleven touchdowns, averaging 4.9 yards per carry. The team also sent three offensive linemen to the Pro Bowl: guard Landon Dickerson, tackle Lane Johnson, and center Jason Kelce. Kicker Jake Elliott made 20 of 23 field goals (87%), including 5-of-6 from at least 50 yards.

Philadelphia's defense ranked second in the league in yards allowed (5,125) and set an NFL record with four players who recorded at least ten sacks. The defensive line features defensive ends Josh Sweat and Brandon Graham, who each recorded 11 sacks, along with defensive tackles Fletcher Cox (seven sacks), Javon Hargrave (11 sacks), and Milton Williams (4 sacks). Pro Bowl linebacker Haason Reddick ranked second in the NFL with 16 sacks while forcing five fumbles and recovering three. Linebackers T. J. Edwards and Kyzir White each recorded over 100 combined tackles and broke up seven passes. In the secondary, safety C. J. Gardner-Johnson co-led the NFL with six interceptions, while All-Pro cornerbacks Darius Slay and James Bradberry each had three.

It was Philadelphia's fourth Super Bowl, following a win in Super Bowl LII and losses in Super Bowls XV and XXXIX. The Eagles also won three pre-Super Bowl NFL championships in 1948, 1949, and 1960.

=== Playoffs ===
The Chiefs entered the playoffs as the No. 1 seed in the AFC. They defeated the Jacksonville Jaguars, 27–20, in the AFC Divisional round. In a tightly contested game, the Chiefs held off a late fourth-quarter rally by the Jaguars. Chiefs quarterback Patrick Mahomes went down early in the game with a high right ankle sprain injury which forced him out of the game for a drive, but he was able to return shortly after leaving. The AFC Championship pitted the Chiefs against the Cincinnati Bengals in a rematch of the 2021 AFC Championship game. This was the fifth consecutive AFC Championship hosted by the Chiefs, extending their record. Much like the previous year's contest, the game was close toward the end of the fourth quarter. On the game's last drive, tied at 20, Bengals defensive end Joseph Ossai was flagged for a late hit on Patrick Mahomes after he stepped out of bounds, which set the Chiefs up in field goal range with eight seconds remaining. Harrison Butker then kicked a 45-yard field goal to send the Chiefs to the Super Bowl with a 23–20 win.

The Eagles went into the playoffs as the No. 1 seed in the NFC. Their first playoff matchup was against their NFC East rival New York Giants. The Eagles quickly jumped to a 28–0 halftime lead and cruised to the NFC Championship game with a 38–7 victory, which marked the first playoff win for Eagles quarterback Jalen Hurts and head coach Nick Sirianni. In the NFC Championship, the Eagles hosted the San Francisco 49ers. The Eagles won the NFC Championship, 31–7, as the 49ers lost their starting and backup quarterbacks to injury.

=== Pre-game notes ===
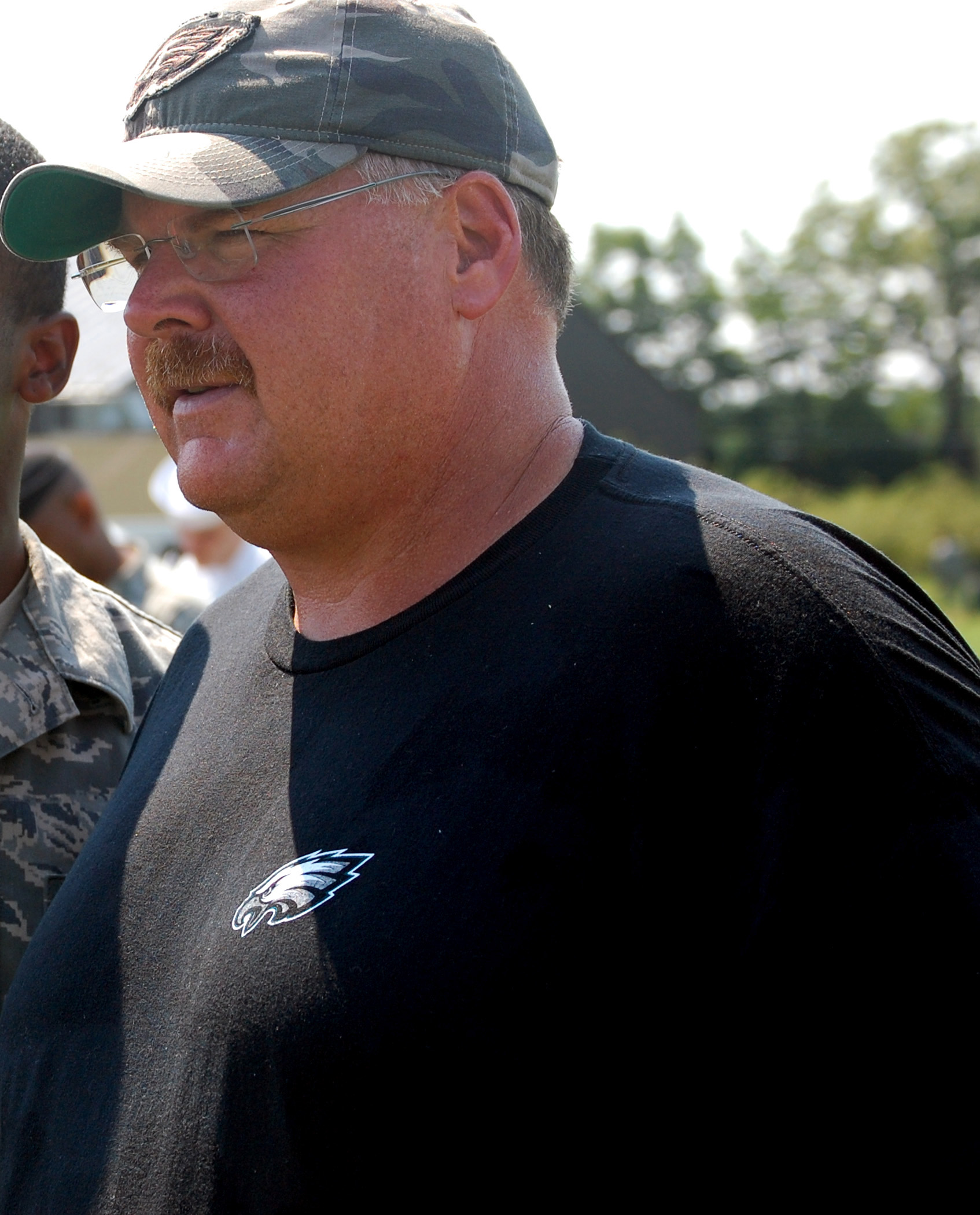
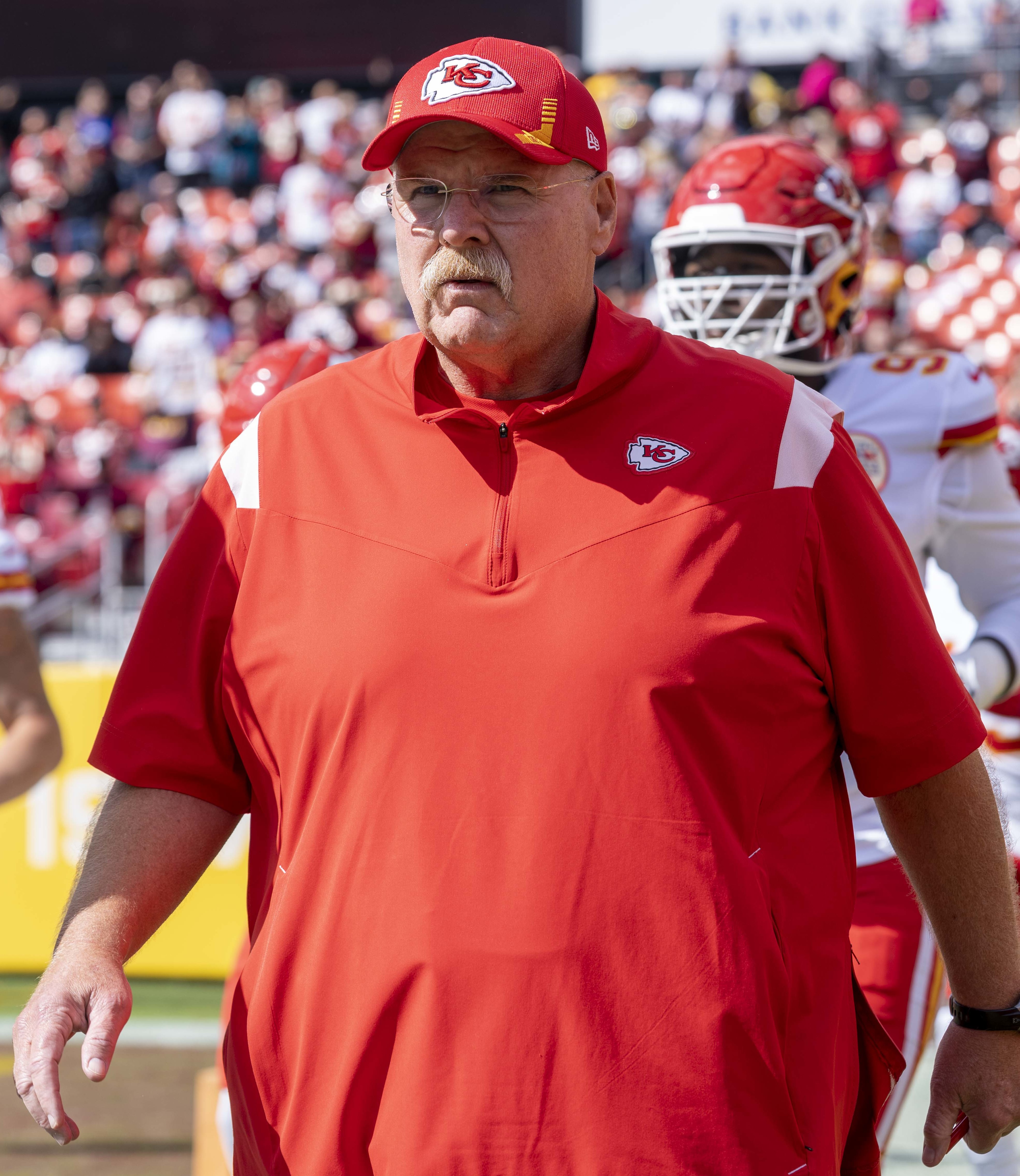
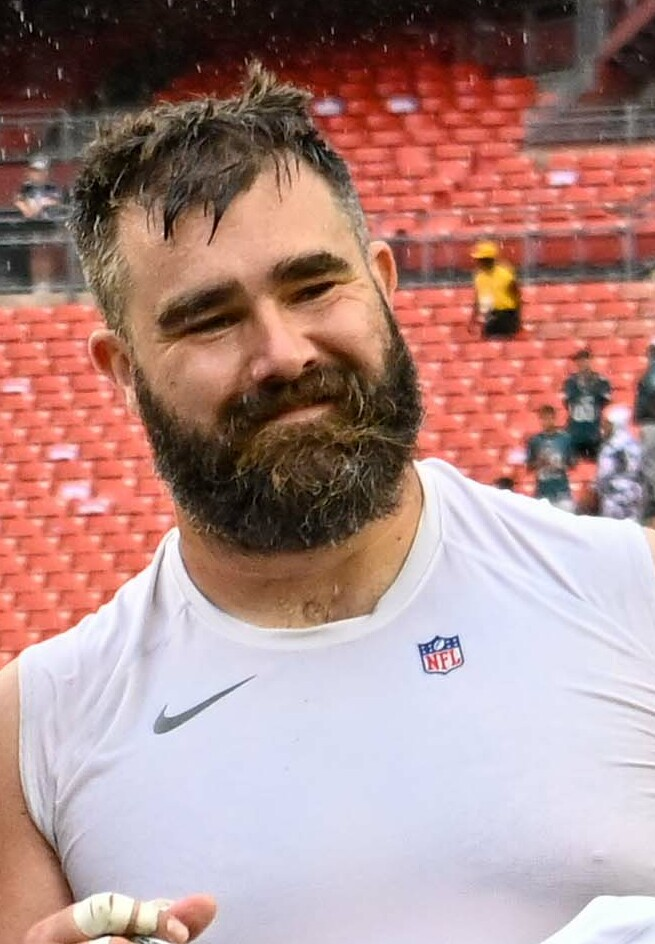
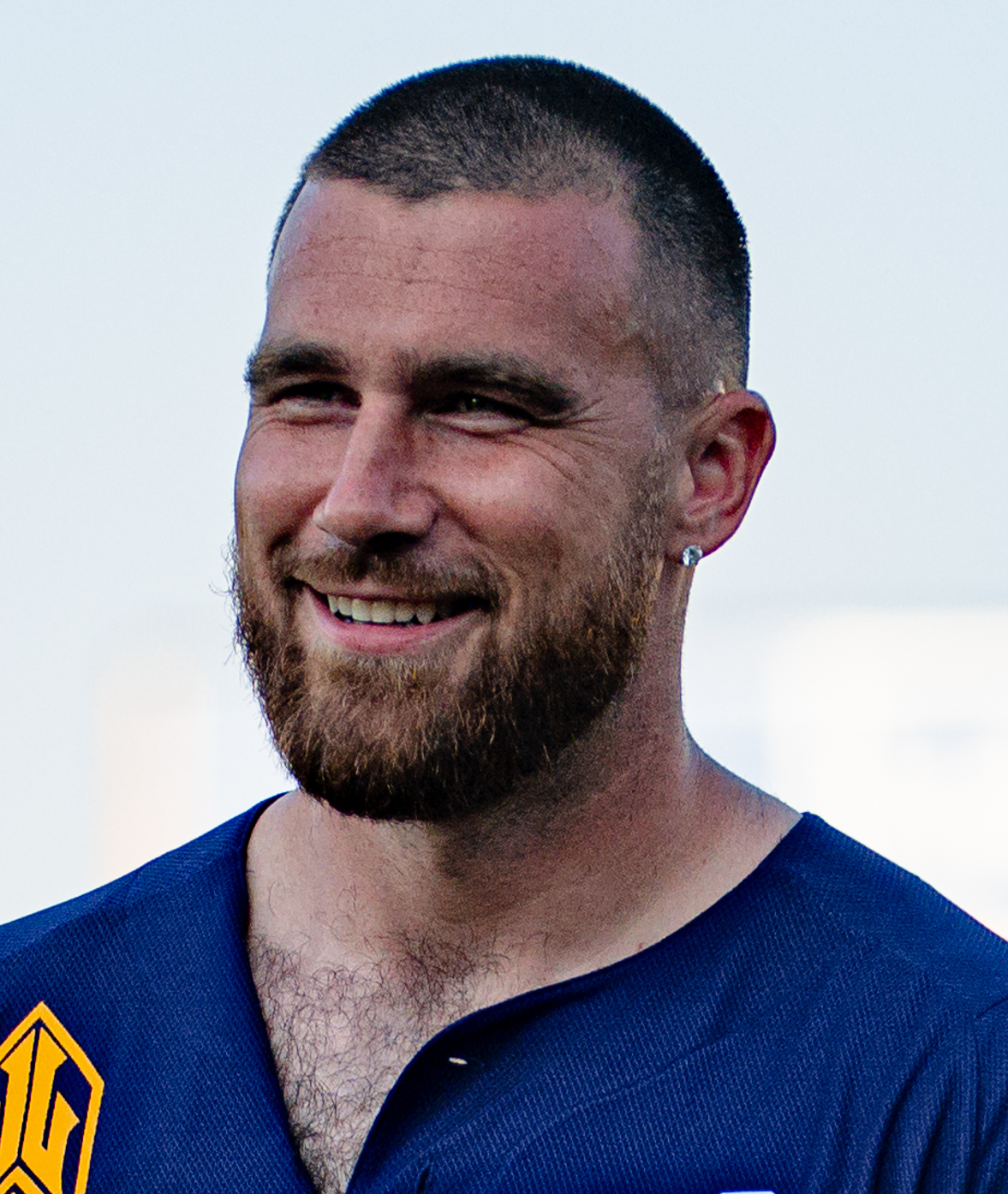
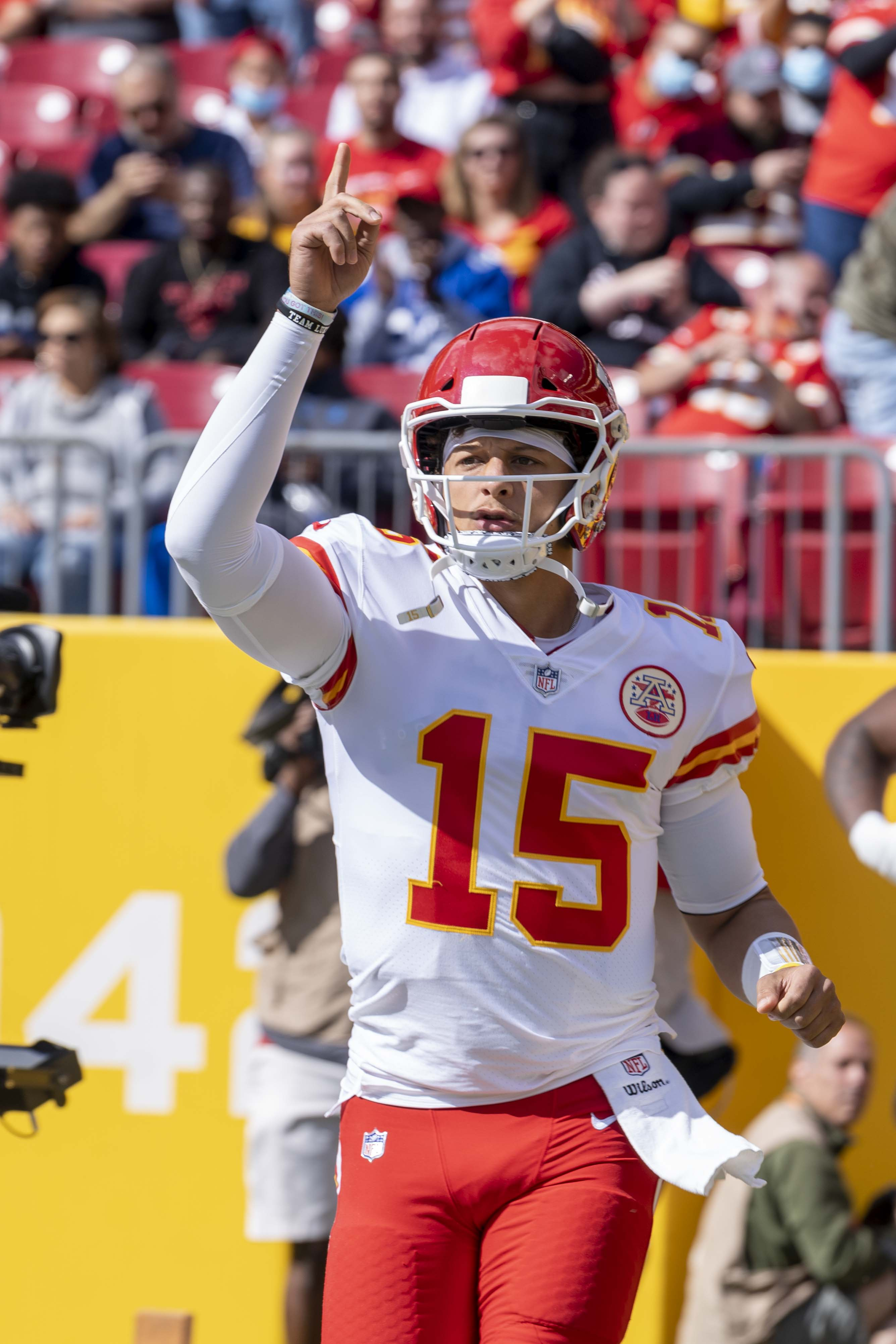
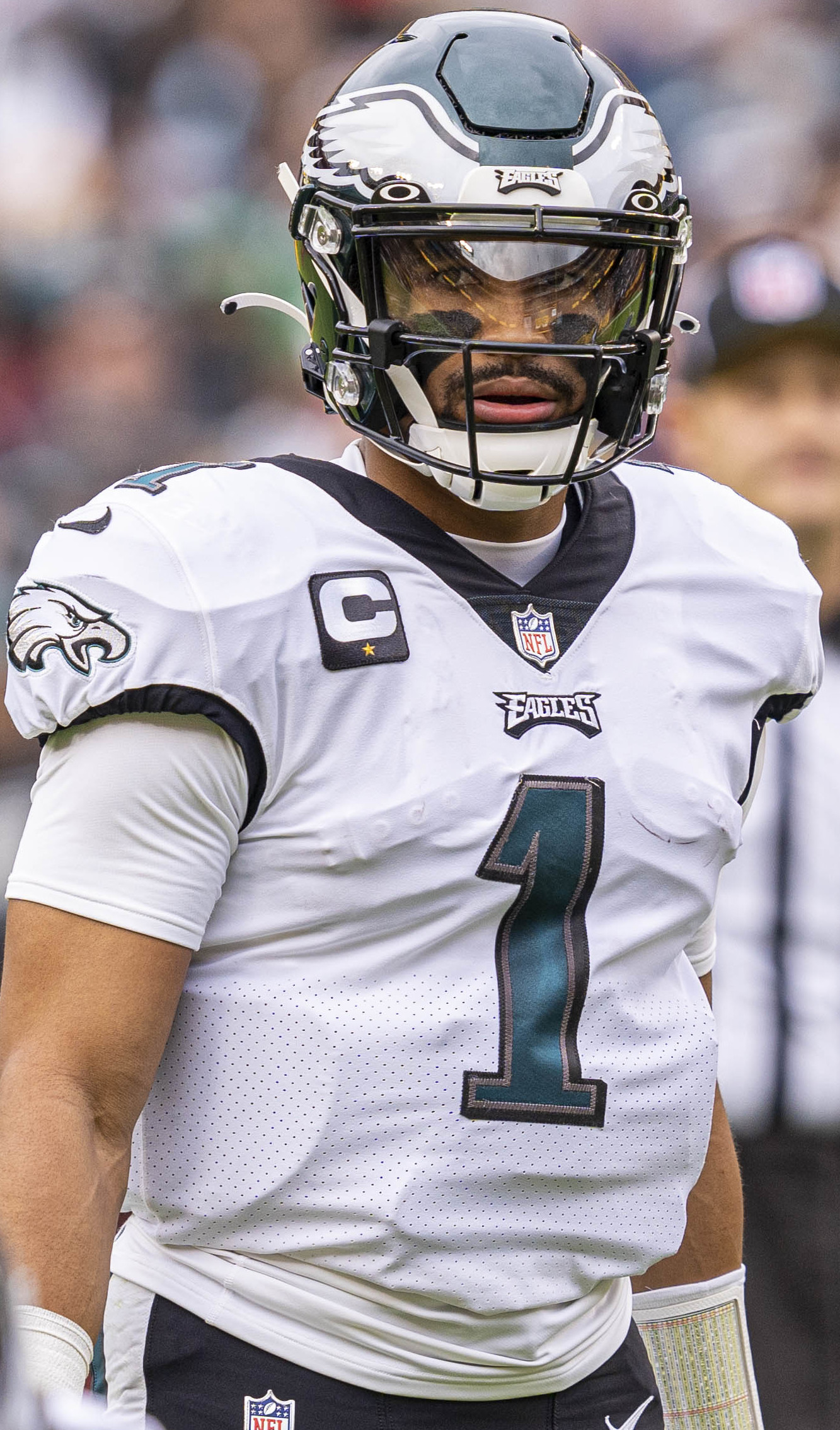
The game was quick to earn the colloquial names Andy Reid Bowl and Kelce Bowl. It also was the first Super Bowl to feature two black starting quarterbacks.

As the designated home team in the Super Bowl's annual rotation between the two conferences, the Eagles chose to wear their green home jerseys with white pants. The Chiefs wore their white away jerseys with red pants.

As the designated home team, the Eagles practiced at the host team Arizona Cardinals' practice facility in Tempe, Arizona, the week leading up to the game. The Chiefs practiced at Arizona State University, also in Tempe.

The game was informally referred to as the "Andy Reid Bowl", as Chiefs head coach Andy Reid had served as the head coach of the Eagles from 1999 to 2012. Reid became the fifth head coach to face his former team in the Super Bowl, joining Weeb Ewbank (Super Bowl III), Dan Reeves (XXXIII), Jon Gruden (XXXVII), and Pete Carroll (XLIX).

The game was also referred to as the "Kelce Bowl", as this marked the first Super Bowl to feature brothers playing against each other: Chiefs tight end Travis Kelce and Eagles center Jason Kelce.

The game was the first Super Bowl between two black starting quarterbacks: Patrick Mahomes of the Chiefs and Jalen Hurts of the Eagles. Mahomes (27 years of age) and Hurts (24) were the youngest starting quarterback pair in Super Bowl history.

This was also the first meeting between teams from Kansas City and Philadelphia for a major professional sports championship since the 1980 World Series, which featured the Kansas City Royals and Philadelphia Phillies.

== Broadcasting ==
=== United States ===
==== Television ====
Super Bowl LVII was televised by Fox. It marked the final game to be broadcast under the NFL television contract that began in 2014. Fox broadcast the game in Dolby Vision high-dynamic-range (HDR) color exclusively on Xfinity.

This was the first Super Bowl assignment for Fox's broadcast team of play-by-play announcer Kevin Burkhardt and color analyst Greg Olsen, who replaced Joe Buck and Troy Aikman after they departed for ABC/ESPN and Monday Night Football. Erin Andrews and Tom Rinaldi reported from the sidelines, and Mike Pereira served as rules expert. Pregame, halftime, and postgame coverage were provided by the Fox NFL Sunday team, hosted by Curt Menefee and Terry Bradshaw along with analysts Howie Long, Michael Strahan, Jimmy Johnson, Rob Gronkowski and NFL insider Jay Glazer.

Fox Deportes televised the game in Spanish, with Adrian Garcia-Marquez on play-by-play and color analyst Alejandro Villanueva.

Fox aired the season two premiere of Next Level Chef as its lead-out program.

==== Advertising ====
Fox charged between $6 and 7 million for a 30-second Super Bowl commercial. At least four cryptocurrency-related ads were planned, but their deals fell through after the bankruptcy of FTX in November 2022. One NFT ad aired during the game, which was a giveaway promoting the game Limit Break. Anheuser-Busch purchased three total minutes for its Michelob Ultra, Bud Light, and Busch Light brands. Other advertisers included Heineken, Diageo, Rémy Martin, Molson Coors, Doritos, Google Pixel and M&M's.

Peacock aired a commercial for their series Poker Face created exclusively for the game, which referenced some of those commercials, all of which aired before it. Warner Bros., Universal Pictures, Disney, Paramount Pictures, Sony Pictures, MGM and Amazon Studios also promoted their upcoming films and series during the game, with trailer premieres for The Flash, Fast X, The Super Mario Bros. Movie, Strays, Ant-Man and the Wasp: Quantumania, Guardians of the Galaxy Vol. 3, Indiana Jones and the Dial of Destiny, Scream VI, Dungeons & Dragons: Honor Among Thieves, Transformers: Rise of the Beasts, 65, Creed III and Air. A 15-second spot for Universal's Cocaine Bear aired during the pre-game show. Fox also aired a commercial for the season 9 premiere of The Masked Singer during the game. Disney also aired a commercial to kick off its "100 Years of Wonder" celebration in honor of the centennial anniversary of the founding of The Walt Disney Company. This commercial was called by many as the best of the night, with System1, a specialist in advertising effectiveness, naming it the "most effective" with a rating of 5.3 stars on their Test Your Ad platform.

Another notable commercial was Interface Interruption, a commercial for the streaming service Tubi. The advertisement tricked its viewers into believing the game had restarted with announcers Kevin Burkhardt and Greg Olsen talking vaguely about the game, before making it appear as though someone had exited the game and changed to Tubi, choosing to watch Mr. & Mrs. Smith. The advertisement, which was purposefully short to alleviate concerns, was met with mixed reactions with some praising the commercial and others such as The Mary Sue and Wanda Sykes referring to it as dangerous.

==== Ratings ====
Nielsen ratings initially reported an average of 113 million viewers, making it the third-highest-rated Super Bowl of all time. Viewership was strongest in the Kansas City market with a 52.0 share, although local viewership was down in comparison to the Chiefs' appearances at Super Bowl LIV (55.7) and LV (59.9). In May 2023, Nielsen revised its ratings data for Super Bowl LVII to account for technical issues that had created "irregularities" in the original ratings, increasing the average to 115.1 million. The game consequently overtook Super Bowl XLIX as the most-watched U.S. television program of all time (the Apollo 11 landing is considered to be the most-watched U.S. television broadcast of all time, as it was reported to have been seen by between 125 and 150 million viewers, but this was a news event carried over multiple networks).

==== Streaming ====
The game was available via streaming to mobile devices on NFL+ and free on the NFL app and NFL.com. This was the first Super Bowl since the league's own NFL+ took over mobile streaming rights from Verizon.

==== Radio ====
Westwood One provided nationwide radio coverage of the game, which was simulcast by NFL Network as part of their Super Bowl GameCenter coverage, with play-by-play announcer Kevin Harlan, color analyst Kurt Warner, sideline reporters Laura Okmin and Mike Golic, and rules expert Gene Steratore. Scott Graham hosted the pregame, halftime, and postgame shows with Ryan Harris providing analysis.

In the immediate local markets of the two teams, 106.5 The Wolf carried the Chiefs call of the game with Mitch Holthus, while WIP carried the Eagles call of the game with Merrill Reese. Both teams carried pre-game and post-game coverage, but did not syndicate the game itself on their terrestrial stations due to NFL rules requiring the Westwood One broadcast to air in all non-participating markets. The Chiefs radio broadcast, however, was available to stream worldwide on WDAF-FM's streaming platform Audacy on desktops and laptops with no blackouts. Both teams' radio broadcasts streamed on NFL+ on mobile devices in the US and NFL Game Pass internationally.

=== International ===
- In Australia, the game was televised by the Seven Network, its sister channel 7mate, and the 7plus on-demand platform. It was also broadcast by ESPN Australia and in New Zealand on the same channel, with ESPN's secondary Monday Night Football team of Steve Levy, Dan Orlovsky and Louis Riddick commentating its international feed. The game was also broadcast by Melbourne radio station 1116 SEN and was commentated by Gerard Whateley
- In Brazil, the game was televised by ESPN, RedeTV! and the Star+ streaming service.
- In Canada, the game's broadcast rights are owned by Bell Media. The game was televised in English on TSN and CTV, subject to simultaneous substitution; RDS carried the French broadcast of the game. Additionally, the game was streamed over TSN+ and DAZN.
- In China, the game was broadcast by Tencent, NFL's media partner for the Chinese market, and nine other TV stations or streaming services also carried the game and Super Bowl coverage provided by Tencent. Tencent and NFL China also sent a crew of 4 reporters to the game.
- In France, the game was televised on beIN Sports and on La Chaîne L'Équipe.
- In Germany and Austria, this was the final NFL game televised by ProSieben, Puls 4 and Puls 24 (with original English game commentary) – TV channels that all belong to the same media group: ProSiebenSat.1 Media; television rights for NFL broadcasts will transfer to RTL Group (RTL, Nitro) for the 2023 season, which are also broadcast in Austria.
- In Greece, the game was televised by Cosmote Sport.
- In Ireland, the game was televised on Virgin Media Two and Virgin Media Four simulcasting ITV's coverage in the UK.
- In Italy, the game was televised by Rai 2 from RAI – Radio Televisione Italiana and the DAZN streaming service.
- In Latin America, the game was televised by ESPN and the Star+ streaming service.
- In Mexico, the game was televised by Canal 5 from TelevisaUnivision, Azteca 7 from TV Azteca and Fox Sports.
- In the Netherlands, the game was televised by ESPN with options to watch the game with either Dutch or original commentary.
- In Oceania, the game was televised by ESPN.
- In Poland this game was televised on TVP Sport, who broadcast was a last Super Bowl game on this station before handover to New official broadcasters of NFL in Poland - DAZN and Polsat Sport stations.
- In Serbia, the game was televised on Sport Klub.
- In Spain, Movistar Plus owns the broadcasting rights to the NFL, and the game was broadcast on their paid channel.
- In Sweden, the Super Bowl was televised for the first time by the linear TV channel TV12 and on the streaming service C More, following the broadcasting rights transfer from previous rights-holder NENT/Viaplay which had broadcast the NFL in Sweden since the 1980s.
- In the United Kingdom, the game was televised free-to-air on ITV1 and STV (for the first time since Super Bowl XLI in 2007). It was carried on radio via TalkSPORT and BBC Radio 5 Live.
- In the United Kingdom and Ireland, the game also aired on Sky's subscription sports channels Sky Sports NFL and Sky Sports Main Event and subscription entertainment channel Sky Showcase.
- In Vietnam, the game was televised by K+ SPORT 2.

== Entertainment ==
=== Pregame ===
American country singer Chris Stapleton sang the national anthem, actress Sheryl Lee Ralph performed "Lift Every Voice and Sing", and R&B singer Babyface sang "America the Beautiful". All three songs were also interpreted in American Sign Language by actor and Arizona native Troy Kotsur, with "America the Beautiful" additionally interpreted in Plains Sign Talk by Collin Denny.

For the first time in Super Bowl history, the flyover was entirely crewed by women to celebrate the 50th anniversary of women flying in the US Navy. Four Navy aircraft taking off from Luke Air Force Base were used: a pair of F/A-18F Super Hornets from the Strike Fighter Squadron 122 "Flying Eagles", an F-35C Lightning II from the Strike Fighter Squadron 97 "Warhawks", and an EA-18G Growler from the Electronic Attack Squadron 129 "Vikings".

Four Pat Tillman Foundation scholars then served as honorary captains during the coin toss ceremony, honoring the memory of Pat Tillman, the former Arizona Cardinals player turned US Army Ranger who was killed by friendly fire in 2004 while deployed to Afghanistan.

=== Halftime ===
On September 23, 2022, Apple Music was announced as the new naming rights sponsor of the Super Bowl halftime show, replacing Pepsi, which had sponsored the previous ten halftime shows. Barbadian singer Rihanna was announced as the headliner of the halftime show on September 25. It marked Rihanna's first live performance in over five years. In a red outfit, she sang portions of twelve of her songs including "Where Have You Been", "Only Girl (In the World)", and "Work". Justina Miles performed the halftime show in American Sign Language for the first time in Super Bowl History.

== Game summary ==
External videos
- Full game broadcast on Fox on YouTube

=== First half ===
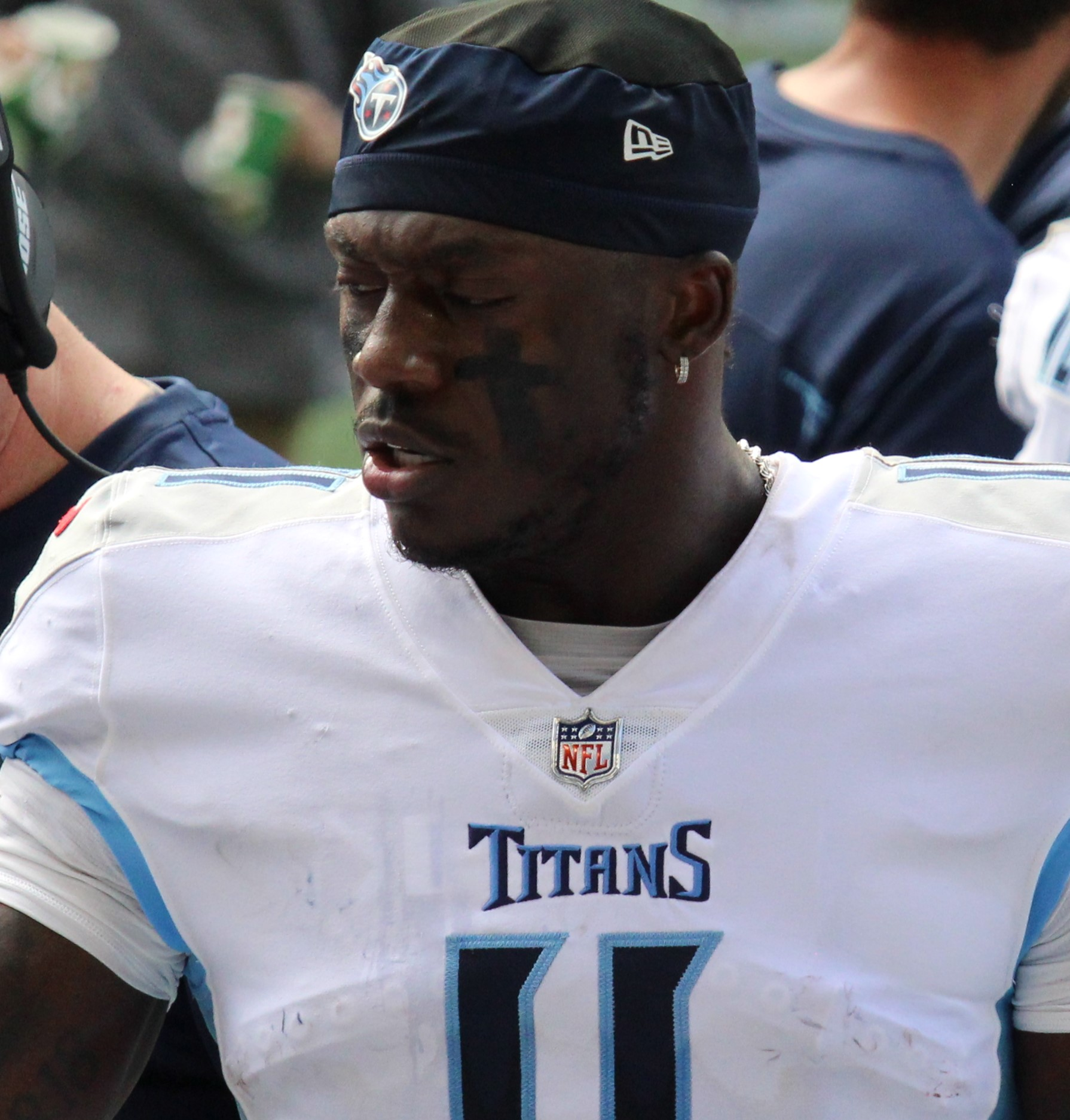
A.J. Brown's 45-yard touchdown catch allowed Philadelphia to retake the lead at the beginning of the second quarter. (Brown pictured in 2021 with Tennessee)

After Kansas City won the coin toss and deferred their choice to the second half, Philadelphia took the opening possession. Their first drive spanned 75 yards in 11 plays and featured two rushes for 12 yards by quarterback Jalen Hurts, also who completed four passes—the longest of which was a 23-yard completion to wide receiver DeVonta Smith. After the Eagles converted a third down from inside the Kansas City 5-yard line, Hurts scored the game's first points using the team's signature Tush Push play for a 1-yard touchdown run to take a 7–0 lead. Kansas City responded with a six-play, 75-yard drive that featured a 24-yard run by running back Isiah Pacheco. Quarterback Patrick Mahomes also completed two passes to tight end Travis Kelce: first for 20 yards, then for an 18-yard touchdown to tie the game at 7–7. Philadelphia's second drive produced the game's first three-and-out after an offensive pass interference penalty on wide receiver Zach Pascal set them back early. On the Chiefs' next drive, a 22-yard completion from Mahomes to Kelce set up a 42-yard field goal attempt by kicker Harrison Butker, but his kick hit the left upright, keeping the game tied. The Eagles began their next drive from their 32-yard line and gained yardage on two rushes and passes by Hurts, in addition to an offside penalty against defensive end Frank Clark, before the first quarter ended. On the first play of the second quarter, the Eagles retook the lead, 14–7, on a 45-yard touchdown pass from Hurts to wide receiver A. J. Brown.

The Chiefs were forced to a three-and-out on their next drive. After a Hurts pass and a rush by running back Kenneth Gainwell each gained 9 yards, Hurts fumbled the ball while running into linebacker Nick Bolton, who recovered it in stride and ran it back 36 yards for a touchdown, tying the game again at 14–14. This would be Philadelphia's only turnover of the postseason. Hurts led the Eagles on another drive to retake the lead. Philadelphia converted a pair of fourth downs, first a 4th-and-5 with a 28-yard scramble by Hurts, and later by drawing defensive tackle Derrick Nnadi offside for the other. On the next play, Hurts finished the drive with a 4-yard touchdown run that made the score 21–14 in favor of Philadelphia. The Chiefs were forced to punt again with 1:33 remaining in the half. Prior to this, Mahomes re-aggravated a high ankle sprain that he had suffered earlier in the playoffs and was seen limping to the sideline after the play. However, unlike the Divisional round game against the Jacksonville Jaguars, the Chiefs did not play any further offensive snaps without him. Wide receiver Britain Covey returned the ensuing punt 27 yards to his own 43-yard line, which, in addition to a 22-yard pass from Hurts to Brown near the end of the Eagles' next drive, helped put them into field goal range. However, cornerback Trent McDuffie then made a crucial tackle on Gainwell to keep him in bounds after a 2-yard pass from Hurts, preventing the Eagles from having any chance at throwing to the end zone before halftime. The Eagles used their final timeout to stop the clock, and kicker Jake Elliott made a 35-yard field goal to increase their lead to 24–14 as time expired.

=== Second half ===
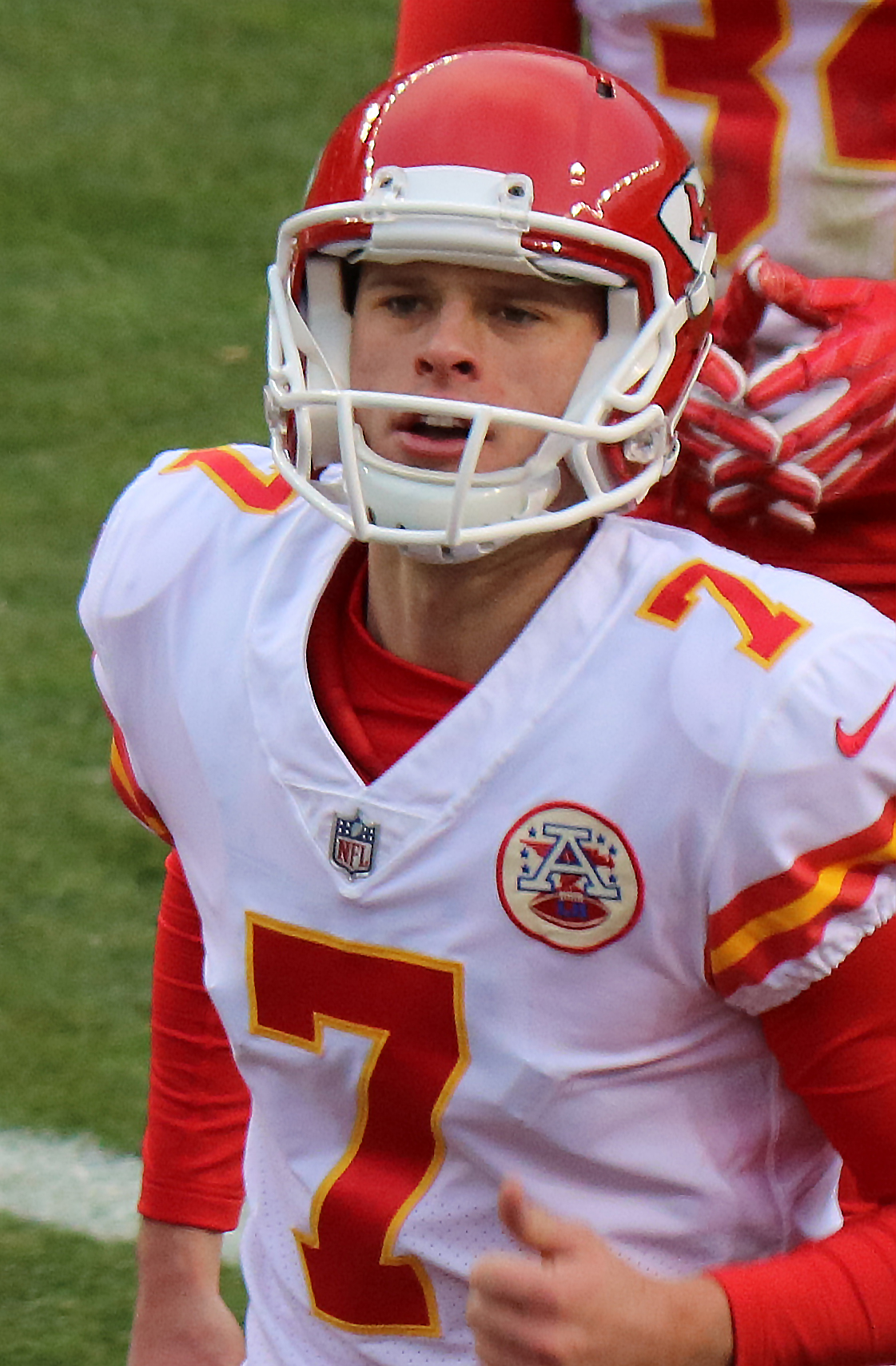
Harrison Butker's 27-yard field goal gave the Chiefs a 38–35 lead with eight seconds left in the game.

Kansas City received the ball to begin the second half and drove 75 yards in 12 plays, with Mahomes completing all three of his passes for 26 yards, while running back Jerick McKinnon picked up 21 yards on two runs, before Pacheco's 1-yard touchdown run cut their deficit to a field goal at 24–21. Philadelphia responded with a 19-play, 65-yard drive, in which Hurts completed two 17-yard passes to tight end Dallas Goedert, one of which converted a 3rd-and-14. On the first play of the drive, Hurts appeared to complete a pass to running back Miles Sanders before cornerback L'Jarius Sneed forced a fumble from Sanders, which was recovered and returned for a touchdown again by Bolton, this time from 24 yards. However, instant replay determined that Sanders did not have full possession of the ball before he was hit by Sneed, taking the touchdown off the board and allowing Philadelphia to continue their drive. At this point, however, the Kansas City defense started to have more success against the Eagles offense, and although the Eagles managed to succeed on a 4th-and-1 attempt, a subsequent 3rd-and-11 try was stopped at the Chiefs' 15-yard line, forcing the Eagles to settle for a 33-yard field goal attempt, which Elliott converted with 1:48 left in the third quarter, making the score 27–21. The Chiefs gained 31 yards on their next four plays, including two Pacheco rushes for 20 yards that reached the Philadelphia 44-yard line, which led them to end the third quarter.

Mahomes completed four passes to wide receiver JuJu Smith-Schuster for a total of 38 yards during the drive and concluded the Chiefs' 12-play, 75-yard drive with a 5-yard touchdown pass to wide receiver Kadarius Toney, giving the Chiefs their first lead of the game, 28–27. It was the first deficit the Eagles faced in the postseason. The Kansas City defense continued their good form by forcing Philadelphia to their first, and only, three-and-out of the second half. The ensuing punt by Arryn Siposs, however, was a poor one and allowed Toney to return it for 65 yards to the Philadelphia 5-yard line and setting a record with the longest punt return in Super Bowl history, surpassing Jordan Norwood’s record of a 61-yard return seven years earlier in Super Bowl 50. After being kept out of the end zone for the first two plays, the Chiefs scored on a 4-yard pass from Mahomes to wide receiver Skyy Moore in an essential mirror image of Toney's touchdown. This was Moore's first NFL career touchdown. The plays that resulted in Toney and Moore's touchdowns, which were less than three minutes apart from each other, became known as the Corn Dogs, which involved using shifts and motion to trick the defense, a similar concept the Eagles used earlier in the season against the Jaguars. The Chiefs now had a 35–27 lead, but Philadelphia responded on their ensuing drive, which spanned eight plays and took just over four minutes off the clock, resulting in a 45-yard pass to Smith that set up Hurts' 2-yard touchdown run on the next play, followed by a two-point conversion with a run by Hurts that tied the score at 35–35 with 5:15 remaining. At the start of Kansas City's next drive, three runs by Pacheco for 15 yards and two completions by Mahomes for 17 yards moved the ball to the Philadelphia 43-yard line. On the next play, despite his re-aggravated ankle injury, Mahomes took off for a 26-yard run — the longest run by any Chiefs player in the game — that gave the Chiefs a first down on Philadelphia's 17-yard line. A 2-yard run by Pacheco ran the clock down to the two-minute warning. A completed pass for no gain brought up 3rd-and-8. Mahomes threw an incomplete pass on the next play, but cornerback James Bradberry was called for a controversial hold against Smith-Schuster, giving Kansas City a new set of downs. After the game, Bradberry's holding penalty was criticized by some, but was supported by others, including by Bradberry himself who would admit after the game that he did hold Smith-Schuster, and was hoping that the officials would not call it. On the next play, with first down at the 11-yard line, McKinnon rushed to the 2-yard line, where he intentionally downed himself, thereby allowing Mahomes to take two knees to run the clock down to eight seconds with Butker kicking a 27-yard field goal. A Hail Mary pass by Hurts was incomplete after he partially slipped, giving the Chiefs a 38–35 victory.

Mahomes completed 21 of his 27 pass attempts for 182 yards and three touchdowns and was named the Super Bowl MVP. He also ran for 44 yards. Pacheco was the top rusher of the game with 15 carries for 76 yards and a touchdown. Bolton had eight solo tackles, one assist, and a fumble return touchdown. Hurts finished the day 27/38 for 304 yards and a touchdown while rushing 15 times for 70 yards and three touchdowns. He set the Super Bowl record for rushing yards and rushing touchdowns by a quarterback while tying the Super Bowl record for rushing touchdowns and points scored (20) as well. He would break his own record of rushing yards by two in Super Bowl LIX two years later. Smith was Hurts' top target with seven receptions, and led all receivers in the game with 100 yards, while Brown had six catches for 96 yards and a touchdown.

The Chiefs' offensive line was heavily praised for their performance in the game. Philadelphia led the NFL with 70 sacks during the season, just two short of the league record. However, in the Super Bowl, Mahomes was not sacked at all, only the second time the Eagles had no sacks in their regular season or playoff games, while Kansas City's offense rushed for 158 yards.

=== Box score ===
Kansas City Chiefs vs Philadelphia Eagles — Game summary

Quarter	1	2	3	4	Total
Chiefs (AFC)	7	7	7	17	38
Eagles (NFC)	7	17	3	8	35

at State Farm Stadium, Glendale, Arizona

- Date: February 12, 2023
- Game time: 4:43 p.m. MST
- Game weather: Sunny, 77 °F (25 °C) (retractable roof open)
- Game attendance: 67,827
- Referee: Carl Cheffers
- TV announcers (Fox): Kevin Burkhardt, Greg Olsen, Erin Andrews, and Tom Rinaldi
- Recap, Game Book

Scoring summary

Quarter	Time	Drive			Team	Scoring information	Score	
Quarter	Time	Plays	Yards	TOP	Team	Scoring information	KC	PHI
1	10:09	11	75	4:51	PHI	Jalen Hurts 1-yard touchdown run, Jake Elliott kick good	0	7
1	6:57	6	75	3:12	KC	Travis Kelce 18-yard touchdown reception from Patrick Mahomes, Harrison Butker kick good	7	7
2	14:52	5	68	2:32	PHI	A. J. Brown 45-yard touchdown reception from Hurts, Elliott kick good	7	14
2	9:39	6	11	3:39	KC	Fumble recovery returned 36 yards for touchdown by Nick Bolton, Butker kick good	14	14
2	2:20	12	75	7:19	PHI	Hurts 4-yard touchdown run, Elliott kick good	14	21
2	0:00	8	40	1:22	PHI	35-yard field goal by Elliott	14	24
3	9:30	10	75	5:30	KC	Isiah Pacheco 1-yard touchdown run, Butker kick good	21	24
3	1:45	17	60	7:45	PHI	33-yard field goal by Elliott	21	27
4	12:04	9	75	4:41	KC	Kadarius Toney 5-yard touchdown reception from Mahomes, Butker kick good	28	27
4	9:22	3	5	0:49	KC	Skyy Moore 4-yard touchdown reception from Mahomes, Butker kick good	35	27
4	5:15	8	75	4:07	PHI	Hurts 2-yard touchdown run, 2-point run by Hurts good	35	35
4	0:08	12	66	5:07	KC	27-yard field goal by Butker	38	35
"TOP" = time of possession. For other American football terms, see Glossary of American football.							38	35

== Final statistics ==
=== Statistical comparison ===
Team-to-team comparison
Statistic	Kansas City Chiefs	Philadelphia Eagles
First downs	21	25
First downs rushing	7	12
First downs passing	12	11
First downs penalty	2	2
Third down efficiency	4–8	11–18
Fourth down efficiency	0–0	2–2
Total net yards	340	417
Net yards rushing	158	115
Rushing attempts	26	32
Yards per rush	6.1	3.6
Yards passing	182	302
Passing–completions/attempts	21–27	27–38
Times sacked–total yards	0–0	2–2
Interceptions thrown	0	0
Punt returns–total yards	2–77	2–35
Kickoff returns–total yards	0–0	1–11
Interceptions–total return yards	0–0	0–0
Punts–average yardage	2–49	2–47.5
Fumbles–lost	1–0	2–1
Penalties–yards	3–14	6–33
Time of possession	24:13	35:47
Turnovers	0	1

Records set (Unless noted as "NFL Championships", "Single Postseason" or "Pro Football History", all records refer only to Super Bowls)
Most points scored, losing team	35	Philadelphia
Fewest kickoff returns by both teams	1	Kansas City (0) Philadelphia (1)
Fewest kickoff return yards by both teams	11	Kansas City (0) Philadelphia (11)
Most rushing yards, Quarterback	70	Jalen Hurts (Philadelphia)
Longest punt return, player	65	Kadarius Toney (Kansas City)
Most kickoffs for touchback	6	Harrison Butker – 6 of 7 kickoffs (Kansas City)
Most kickoffs for touchback	6	Jake Elliott – 6 of 6 kickoffs (Philadelphia)
Records tied
Most rushing touchdowns, both teams	4	Kansas City (1) Philadelphia (3)
Fewest Interceptions by both teams	0	Kansas City (0) Philadelphia (0)
Fewest times sacked, team	0	Kansas City
Fewest turnovers, team	0	Kansas City
Fewest kickoff returns, team	0	Kansas City
Most touchdowns, losing team	4	Philadelphia
Most fourth down conversions, team	2	Philadelphia
Most touchdowns, single game	3	Jalen Hurts (Philadelphia)
Most rushing touchdowns, game	3	Jalen Hurts (Philadelphia)
Most points scored, single game	20	Jalen Hurts (Philadelphia)

=== Individual statistics ===
Kansas City statistics
Chiefs passing
	C/ATT^{1}	Yds	TD	INT	Rating
Patrick Mahomes	21/27	182	3	0	131.8
Chiefs rushing
	Car^{2}	Yds	TD	Lg^{3}	Yds/Car
Isiah Pacheco	15	76	1	24	5.1
Patrick Mahomes	6	44	0	26	7.3
Jerick McKinnon	4	34	0	14	8.5
Skyy Moore	1	4	0	4	4.0
Chiefs receiving
	Rec^{4}	Yds	TD	Lg^{3}	Target^{5}
Travis Kelce	6	81	1	22	6
JuJu Smith-Schuster	7	53	0	14	9
Justin Watson	2	18	0	12	2
Jerick McKinnon	3	15	0	7	3
Noah Gray	1	6	0	6	1
Kadarius Toney	1	5	1	5	1
Skyy Moore	1	4	1	4	1
Marquez Valdes-Scantling	0	0	0	0	1
Jody Fortson	0	0	0	0	1

Philadelphia statistics
Eagles passing
	C/ATT^{1}	Yds	TD	INT	Rating
Jalen Hurts	27/38	304	1	0	103.4
Eagles rushing
	Car^{2}	Yds	TD	Lg^{3}	Yds/Car
Jalen Hurts	15	70	3	28	4.7
Kenneth Gainwell	7	21	0	9	3.0
Miles Sanders	7	16	0	6	2.3
Boston Scott	3	8	0	9	2.7
Eagles receiving
	Rec^{4}	Yds	TD	Lg^{3}	Target^{5}
DeVonta Smith	7	100	0	45	9
A. J. Brown	6	96	1	45	8
Dallas Goedert	6	60	0	17	7
Kenneth Gainwell	4	20	0	9	4
Zach Pascal	2	11	0	9	2
Boston Scott	1	9	0	9	1
Quez Watkins	1	8	0	8	2
Miles Sanders	0	0	0	0	1

^{1}Completions/attempts
^{2}Carries
^{3}Long gain
^{4}Receptions
^{5}Times targeted

== Starting lineups ==
Starting lineups for Super Bowl LVII
Kansas City	Position		Philadelphia
Offense
Travis Kelce	TE	WR	A. J. Brown
Noah Gray	TE		Dallas Goedert
Orlando Brown Jr.	LT		Jordan Mailata
Joe Thuney	LG		Landon Dickerson
Creed Humphrey	C		Jason Kelce
Trey Smith	RG		Isaac Seumalo
Andrew Wylie	RT		Lane Johnson
JuJu Smith-Schuster	WR		Quez Watkins
Marquez Valdes-Scantling	WR		DeVonta Smith
Patrick Mahomes	QB		Jalen Hurts
Isiah Pacheco	RB		Miles Sanders
Defense
George Karlaftis	DE	DT	Linval Joseph
Derrick Nnadi	DT		Fletcher Cox
Chris Jones	DT		Javon Hargrave
Frank Clark	DE		Josh Sweat
Nick Bolton	LB	SAM	Haason Reddick
Willie Gay	LB	MIKE	T. J. Edwards
Jaylen Watson	CB		Avonte Maddox
L'Jarius Sneed	CB		James Bradberry
Trent McDuffie	CB		Darius Slay
Juan Thornhill	S		Marcus Epps
Justin Reid	S		C. J. Gardner-Johnson

== Officials ==
Super Bowl LVII featured seven officials, a replay official, a replay assistant, and eight alternate officials. The numbers in parentheses below indicate their uniform numbers.

- Game officials:
  - Referee: Carl Cheffers (51)
  - Umpire: Roy Ellison (81)
  - Down judge: Jerod Phillips (6)
  - Line judge: Jeff Bergman (32)
  - Field judge: John Jenkins (117)
  - Side judge: Eugene Hall (103)
  - Back judge: Dino Paganelli (105)
  - Replay official: Mark Butterworth
  - Replay assistant: Frank Szczepanik
- Alternate officials:
  - Referee: John Hussey
  - Umpire: Ramon George
  - Down judge: David Oliver
  - Line judge: Tim Podraza
  - Field judge: Terry Brown
  - Side judge: Boris Cheek
  - Back judge: Perry Paganelli
  - Replay official: Tyler Cerimeli

== Aftermath ==
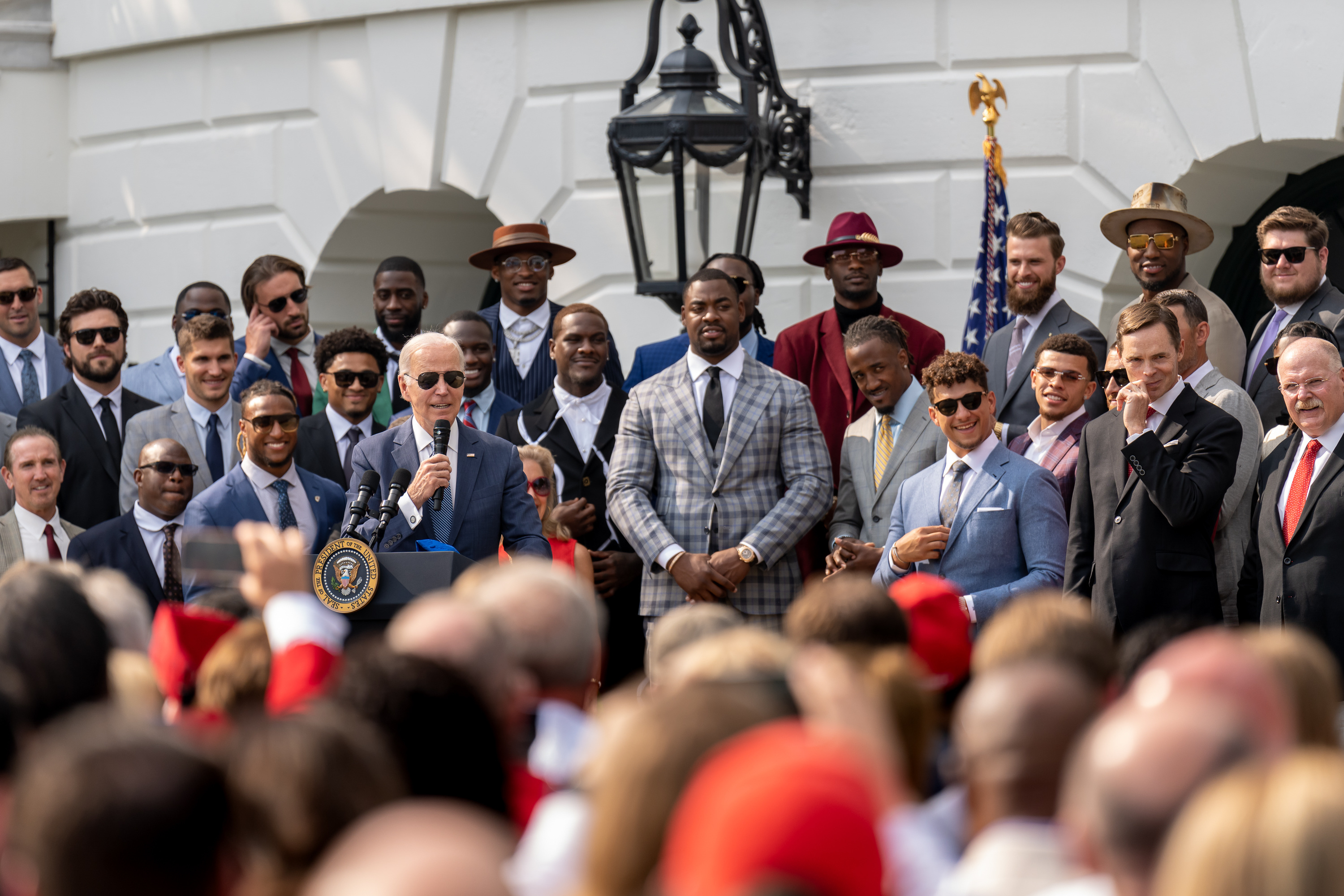
President Joe Biden with the Kansas City Chiefs on June 5, 2023.

The Chiefs successfully defended their Super Bowl title by winning Super Bowl LVIII the following season over the San Francisco 49ers, becoming the first team to repeat as Super Bowl champions since the 2003 and 2004 New England Patriots. The Super Bowl LVIII win, being the Chiefs' third Super Bowl win and fourth Super Bowl appearance in five seasons, led many sports commentators to establish the team as a dynasty.

The Eagles started the following season with a 10–1 record, the best in the league. However, the Eagles faltered down the stretch, losing five of their last six games and falling to second place in the NFC East behind the Dallas Cowboys, and the 5-seed in the NFC. They were subsequently blown out by the Tampa Bay Buccaneers in the Wild Card round. Their late-season collapse is considered by many to be one of the worst in NFL history. The Eagles promptly fired offensive coordinator Brian Johnson and defensive coordinator Sean Desai within a week of their playoff exit.

Super Bowl LIX two years later featured a rematch of the Chiefs and Eagles. In that game, Kansas City became the first two-time defending Super Bowl champion to play for a chance to win a third straight Super Bowl championship. However, Philadelphia defeated Kansas City 40–22 in the rematch, denying the Chiefs their three-peat bid.
