= PTF =

- Palomar Transient Factory, an astronomical survey program
- Pedotransfer function, a concept used in soil science
- Phase transfer function, used for the optics of an imaging system

Computing

- Program temporary fix (PTF file format), an IBM locution to designate bug fixes
- PlayStation Portable, a file extension for the PlayStation Portable systems
- Pro Tools 7 up to Pro Tools 9 session (project) file

Other

- Pat Tillman Foundation, a scholarship and leadership nonprofit serving U.S. military veterans and military spouses
- Peter Tatchell Foundation, a British human rights organization
- Police Task Force, former name of the Police Tactical Unit of the Singapore Police Force
- Präzisionsteilefertigung Steffen Pfüller, a producer of high-tech precision parts and assemblies
- PTF boat a type of Patrol Craft used in Vietnam
