= Arizona Senate Bill 1138 =

2022 law in Arizona

Senate Bill 1138

Arizona Legislature
- Long title: AN ACT AMENDING TITLE 32, CHAPTER 32, ARTICLE 1, ARIZONA, REVISED STATUTES, BY ADDING SECTION SECTION 32-3230; RELATING TO HEALTH CARE.
- Territorial extent: Arizona
- Enacted by: Arizona Senate
- Enacted by: Arizona House of Representatives
- Signed by: Doug Ducey
- Signed: March 30, 2022

Legislative history

First chamber: Arizona Senate
- Introduced: January 11, 2022
- First reading: January 11, 2022
- Second reading: January 12, 2022
- Third reading: February 24, 2022
- Voting summary: 16 voted for; 12 voted against; 2 present not voting

Second chamber: Arizona House of Representatives
- Received from the Arizona Senate: February 25, 2022
- First reading: March 1, 2022
- Second reading: March 2, 2022
- Third reading: March 24, 2022
- Voting summary: 31 voted for; 26 voted against; 3 present not voting

Final stages
- Finally passed both chambers: March 28, 2022

Summary
- Prohibits medical professionals from administering sex reassignment surgery to Arizonans under eighteen years old.
- Status: In force

Arizona Senate Bill 1138 (SB 1138) is a 2022 law in the state of Arizona that prohibits doctors from administering sex reassignment surgery, including related cosmetic surgeries, to Arizonans under eighteen years old. It was signed into law by Governor Doug Ducey on March 30, 2022, along with Senate Bill 1165, which relates to transgender people in sports.

The bill was originally a blanket ban on gender-affirming medical care for minors, but was rejected in the legislature and was later reintroduced as a sex reassignment surgery ban.

== Provisions ==
Senate Bill 1138 prohibits any medical professional from administering sex reassignment surgery or closely related surgeries, such as mastectomies, mammaplasties, and genital reassignment surgery, to those under eighteen years old, generally referred to as minors. The bill does not affect other forms of gender-affirming medical care, such as hormone replacement therapy. Intersex people are covered in an exemption.

== Reactions ==
=== Support ===
Governor Ducey, who signed the bill into law, said that the bill was only to protect minors from irreversible surgeries until they are an adult, and nothing more.

=== Opposition ===
The Human Rights Campaign opposed both Senate Bill 1138 and Senate Bill 1165, the latter of which affects transgender people in sports. California Attorney General Rob Bonta revoked non-essential state funded travel to Arizona shortly following its passage. The ACLU of Arizona asked Governor Ducey to veto the bill.

== See also ==
- Arizona Senate Bill 1165
- Gender-affirming surgery
- LGBTQ rights in Arizona
