= LGBTQ rights in Arizona =

- Arizona (US)
- Legal status: Legal since 2001
- Gender identity: Transgender people allowed to change legal gender
- Discrimination protections: Sexual orientation and gender identity covered in employment anti-discrimination laws statewide since 2020 (Bostock v. Clayton County)

Family rights
- Recognition of relationships: Same sex marriage since 2014 (Majors v. Horne)
- Adoption: Legal since 2014 (Majors v. Horne)

Lesbian, gay, bisexual, transgender, and queer (LGBTQ) people in the U.S. state of Arizona may face legal challenges not experienced by non-LGBTQ residents. Same-sex sexual activity is legal in Arizona, and same-sex couples are able to marry and adopt. Nevertheless, the state provides only limited protections against discrimination on the basis of sexual orientation and gender identity. Several cities, including Phoenix and Tucson, have enacted ordinances to protect LGBTQ people from unfair discrimination in employment, housing and public accommodations.

Phoenix and Tucson are home to prominent LGBTQ communities. The first Phoenix Pride parade took place in 1981, and now attracts thousands of attendees every year. Tucson Pride, founded in 1977, was the first in the state. 2019 polling from the Public Religion Research Institute showed that 71% of Arizona residents supported non-discrimination legislation protecting LGBTQ people.

== History and legality of same-sex sexual activity ==
Arizona has been inhabited by indigenous peoples for thousands of years. Similarly to many Native American tribes in the United States, these groups have traditions of cross-dressing and gender variance, and had perceptions of gender and human sexuality different from that of the Western world. There were no legal or social punishments for engaging in same-sex sexual activity.

Nádleehi (Navajo: nádleeh or nádleehé; literally one who constantly transforms) refers to individuals who are a "male-bodied person with a feminine nature". Historically, the Navajo recognized four gender roles: asdzáán (feminine female), hastiin (masculine male), dilbaa (masculine female), and nádleehi (feminine male). The nádleehi identity is fluid, and such individuals may display both male and female characteristics. Due to the perceived "balance" between both sexes, they were typically chosen for certain societal and communal roles, such as spiritual healers. They would traditionally wear female clothes and do female work, and some would have sexual relations with men which was accepted by the tribe. (See also "LGBT rights in the Navajo Nation")

The Tohono O'odham recognize the term wi:k’ovat, which refers to individuals who are assigned male at birth but act, dress and behave as female. Other people groups recognize similar terms in reference to transgender people and gender variance; male-to-female individuals are hova among the Hopi, alyha among the Mohave, ilyaxai' among the Maricopa, tüwasawuts among the Southern Paiute, ndéʼsdzan among the Western Apache, elxa' among the Quechan, and elha among the Cocopah, whereas female-to-male individuals are hwame among the Mohave, kwiraxame' among the Maricopa, kwe'rhame among the Quechan, and warrhameh among the Cocopah. Nowadays, the term "two-spirit" is increasingly used to refer to these identities.

The relative openness to these different gender identities mostly disappeared after European settlement and colonization. Even among the Native Americans, societal perceptions began to change. Owing to the introduction of a more stringent set of beliefs on gender and sexuality by the Europeans, nádleehi became the subject of ridicule. Today, LGBT Navajo may find it difficult being accepted by their family, with 70% of LGBT Navajo youth reportedly attempting suicide. Spanish missionaries took repeated notes of these traditions, with one Franciscan missionary stating "that these accursed people will disappear with the growth of the missions. The abominable vice will be eliminated to the extent that the Catholic faith and all the other virtues are firmly implanted there, for the glory of God and the benefits of these poor ignorants". Among the Hopi, Christian converts were prohibited from attending the traditional snake dance because "male cross-dressing could be observed". Jonathan Ned Katz notes, "the Christianization of Native Americans and the colonial appropriation of the continent by white, Western 'civilization' included the attempt by the conquerors to eliminate various traditional forms of Indian homosexuality—as part of their attempt to destroy that Native culture which might fuel resistance—a form of cultural genocide involving both Native Americans and gay people". Will Roscoe in his work The Zuni Man-Woman writes that the "prevalence of sodomy" and the tolerance or even respect of transgender people fueled the Spanish explorers' argument for the colonization of native peoples and their lands in the name of Christianity.

Sodomy laws were first enacted after modern-day Arizona became part of the Spanish Empire, later joining the newly independent Mexico and finally the United States. Shortly after the Arizona Territory was established in 1863, the Arizona Territorial Legislature passed a criminal code containing provisions banning sodomy with five years' to life imprisonment. It was extended to include fellatio in 1912, while the penalty for sodomy was reduced to one to five years' imprisonment. As was the case for sodomy laws at the time, the code punished both heterosexual and homosexual conduct. In 1951, the penalty was changed to five to twenty years' imprisonment, and further crackdowns on homosexual activity were passed, requiring all those convicted under the sodomy laws to register with the local sheriff and report any change in address. Over the following years, the Arizona Supreme Court rejected multiple challenges that the law was vague and unconstitutional.

In the summer of 1979, the Spiritual Conference for Radical Fairies took place at the Sri Ram Ashram near Benson, in which participants sought to expand the ideas of spirituality within the context of gay liberation.

The Arizona Equity Act of 2001 repealed the state's sodomy laws and legalized homosexuality.

== Recognition of same-sex relationships ==
Arizona has recognized same-sex marriage since being forced to end enforcement of its statutory and constitutional bans on same-sex marriage by the decision of a U.S. district court on October 17, 2014.

Despite the court ruling, the same-sex marriage ban still remains in the state's constitution, and on the Arizona State Legislature's website makes no mention that the ban was struck down or otherwise rendered inoperative. Likewise, the state's statutory ban on same-sex marriage, as well as its ban on recognizing same-sex marriages conducted in places where it is legalized, remain in the Arizona Revised Statutes, Although the statutory ban is unenforceable due to Obergefell v. Hodges, and the ban on recognition of same-sex marriage contracted outside of Arizona is unenforceable due to the passage of the Respect for Marriage Act in 2022.

=== Prior ban ===
In November 2006, Arizona voters rejected Proposition 107, which would have banned same-sex marriage and any legal status similar to marriage (such as civil unions or domestic partnerships).

Two years later, however, Arizona voters approved a less restrictive Proposition 102 which amended the Constitution to ban the recognition of same-sex marriage.

With no constitutional ban on domestic partnerships or civil unions, several cities, including Phoenix, Bisbee, Tucson, Flagstaff and more, subsequently enacted such measures.

== Adoption and parenting ==
Arizona permits adoption by individuals. There are no explicit prohibitions on adoption by same-sex couples or on second-parent adoptions. However, state law requires adoption agencies to give primary consideration to adoptive placement with a married couple. Agencies may place a child with a legally single person if it is in the child's best interest or if there is not a married couple available.

Lesbian couples have access to assisted reproduction services, such as in vitro fertilization. State law recognizes the non-genetic, non-gestational mother as a legal parent to a child born via donor insemination, but only if the parents are married.

In September 2017, the Arizona Supreme Court ruled unanimously that same-sex spouses have the same parental rights as opposite-sex spouses under state law. Basing their ruling on Obergefell v. Hodges and Pavan v. Smith, the court concluded that married same-sex couples have the right to list both their names on their child(ren)'s birth certificate(s). Following some more legal process at the trial court, in October 2020 the Arizona Court of Appeals ruled that birth certificates must accommodate same-sex parents.

Surrogacy, whether gestational or traditional, is prohibited under Arizona law. Despite this, in light of the 1994 court case of Soos v. Superior Court, which held that intended parents can rebut the statutory presumption that the gestational carrier is the legal mother of the child, couples began to petition courts for a pre-birth order, which would declare them the legal parents of the child rather than the surrogate. The contracts remain unenforceable and consequently some attorneys will not prepare surrogacy agreements. Only the biological parents can obtain a pre-birth order, meaning that for same-sex couples the non-biological parent must complete a second-parent adoption to be legally recognized as a parent.

In April 2022, a bill passed by the Arizona State Legislature and signed into law effective immediately (with an emergency clause) by the Governor of Arizona Doug Ducey - that allows religious organizations to "legally discriminate" against same-sex couples (and other groups or characteristics) that want to adopt or foster children.

== Discrimination protections ==
Map of Arizona cities that had sexual orientation and/or gender identity anti–employment discrimination ordinances prior to Bostock Sexual orientation and gender identity with anti–employment discrimination ordinance Sexual orientation and gender identity solely in public employment Sexual orientation in public employment No anti-discrimination ordinance¹ ¹Since 2020 as a result of Bostock, discrimination on account of sexual orientation or gender identity in public and private employment is outlawed throughout the state. Discrimination against state employees based on their sexual orientation has been illegal since 2003.

As part of the United States, Arizona is covered under the Bostock v. Clayton County, Altitude Express, Inc. v. Zarda, and R.G. & G.R. Harris Funeral Homes Inc. v. Equal Employment Opportunity Commission rulings in 2020, which ruled that discrimination in the workplace on the basis of sexual orientation or gender identity is discrimination on the basis of sex, and Title VII therefore protects LGBT employees from discrimination.

Beside the rulings, various anti-discrimination provisions have been promulgated by the Arizona state government, as well as various Arizona municipalities, since at least the 1990s.

=== 1992 ===
Phoenix's city council approved a non-discrimination ordinance that bans workplace discrimination against gays and lesbians who work for the city, or at companies with city contracts and at least 35 employees.

=== 1999 ===
Tucson's city council passed a non-discrimination ordinance.

=== 2003 ===
Then-Governor Janet Napolitano issued an executive order prohibiting discrimination on the basis of sexual orientation against state employees.

=== 2013 ===
In February, Phoenix's city council revised its non-discrimination ordinance to ban discrimination in employment, housing and public accommodations based on sexual orientation, gender identity, or gender expression.

In March, Flagstaff's city council passed a civil rights ordinance that bans discrimination on the basis of sexual orientation, gender identity and military veteran status in the area of employment and public accommodations. Exemptions were made for religious-based organizations, "expressive groups," government agencies, and businesses with fewer than 15 employees.

=== 2014 ===
In February, Tempe's city council approved, in a unanimous vote, an ordinance that bans discrimination in employment, housing and public accommodations, with exceptions for religious groups and private clubs.

During that same month, then-Governor Jan Brewer vetoed a "religious freedom" bill which would have granted any individual or legal entity an exemption from any state law if it substantially burdened their exercise of religion, widely reported as targeting LGBTQ people. The bill had drawn international criticism.

=== 2015 ===
Sedona approved an ordinance that offers protection from workplace, housing and public accommodations discrimination.

=== 2018 ===
In June, the Arizona Court of Appeals upheld Phoenix's anti-discrimination ordinance, after a legal challenge seeking to strike it down was filed in 2016.

In November, Winslow's city council passed a nondiscrimination ordinance that bans discrimination on the basis of gender identity, sexual orientation, or familial status.

=== 2021 ===
In March, Mesa's city council approved a non-discrimination ordinance that bans discrimination in employment, housing and places of public accommodation based on, among other things, sexual orientation and gender identity.

In April, Scottsdale's city council approved an anti-discrimination ordinance that offers protection for the LGBTQ+ community, with exemptions made for various entities, including religious organizations, under certain conditions. The ordinance took effect on May 20.

Also in April, a group that called itself United For Mesa submitted signatures to Mesa city officials, in an effort to place on the ballot a ballot initiative to repeal the city's non-discrimination ordinance.

In May, Glendale passed a non-discrimination ordinance that bans discrimination in employment, housing, and public accommodation in a unanimous vote.

Also in May, signatures submitted by United For Mesa in an effort to force a ballot measure to repeal Mesa's non-discrimination were withdrawn, after a group filed a complaint that claims United For Mesa lacked the signatures necessary to force the ballot measure.

In June, Tolleson's city council approved a non-discrimination ordinance.

=== 2023 Executive order ===
In January 2023, the Governor of Arizona signed an executive order to ban "state based employment and contract discrimination based on both sexual orientation and gender identity".

=== 2023 ===
In June 2023, Arizona Attorney General Kris Mayes affirmed that state law interpreted sex discrimination to include gender identity and sexual orientation.

== Hate crime law ==
Arizona includes sexual orientation as a protected category in its hate crime law. The law provides additional legal penalties for the commission of a crime motivated by the victim's sexual orientation, amongst other categories. Gender identity is not included, though federal law covers crimes triggered by the victim's gender identity since the Matthew Shepard and James Byrd, Jr. Hate Crimes Prevention Act was signed into law in October 2009.

== Transgender rights ==
A regulation passed in 1982 states that Medicaid cannot cover the costs of sex reassignment surgery. In August 2020, two transgender teenagers, with the help of the National Center for Lesbian Rights and the National Health Law Program (NHeLP), along with co-counsel King & Spalding LLP and Perkins Coie LLP, filed a suit challenging the 1982 regulation as unconstitutional.

On 25 April 2019, the Arizona Supreme Court ruled that family courts have the authority to determine the type of care a transgender child can receive, but only in limited circumstances. In a case that centered on a divorced couple who disagreed on how to care for their child with gender dysphoria, the court held that "when an impasse occurs, the court is authorized to determine not only the parenting plan element in dispute, but also other factors that are necessary to promote and protect the emotional and physical health of the child". The case was remanded to the family court with the directive that any future directives be narrowly tailored and supported by evidence that harm is imminent for the child.

In November 2020, three families with transgender children filed a lawsuit against the Arizona Department of Health Services in federal court demanding the state agency allow them to change the legal gender on their birth certificate without needing to undergo sex reassignment surgery. As of August 2023, the birth certificate court case is ongoing - and all transgender individuals who are residents of Arizona have formally joined in the "lawsuit and litigation processes against the state of Arizona".

In March 2022, two bills passed within the Arizona State Legislature - the first bill legally bans sex reassignment surgery on transgender children (while leaving in an exception to allow surgery on intersex children) The Governor of Arizona Doug Ducey signed the bill into law. The ban on sex reassignment surgery on minors would go into effect one year after enactment (i.e. March 2023).

In March 2023, the Arizona Department of Education introduced a hotline for people to report if a school had exposed children to a number of topics, including "gender ideology", with subjects of reports being subsequently investigated.

In June 2023, the Governor of Arizona vetoed anti-trans bills that deal with bathrooms and banning “pronoun usage” within classrooms that passed the Arizona Legislature.

In June 2023, the Governor of Arizona signed an extensive executive order - for any "government employee of Arizona over the age of 21 years old" to have full access and insurance coverage to gender-affirming healthcare and services through Medicaid. The ACLU is going to the courts to try and get the lawsuit "mooted and ended" immediately, right after the executive order was implemented. In 2019, several lawsuits commenced to try and "null and void" a government of Arizona policy that explicitly banned Medicaid coverage of sexual reassignment surgery and other gender-affirming healthcare and services.

In August 2024, a federal judge ordered that individuals who want to change their sex on a birth certificate - can legally do so without sexual reassignment surgery. The state will change the gender marker on a driver's license and state ID card upon receipt of a "signed statement from a licensed physician attesting that the applicant is irrevocably committed to the gender-change process." Changing gender on a driver's license and ID card does not require undergoing sex reassignment surgery.

=== Sports ===
In March 2022, another anti-trans house bill was passed within the Arizona State Legislature - the second bill legally bans transgender children from playing any female sports, athletics and/or Olympics. The Governor of Arizona Doug Ducey signed the March bills into law. The transgender sports ban would go into effect 30 days after enactment.

== Conversion therapy ==
In August 2017, the Pima County Board of Supervisors passed, in a 3–2 vote, an ordinance banning conversion therapy. Offenders may pay up to 2,500 dollars in fines.

In June 2023, an executive order was signed and implemented by the Governor of Arizona - to explicitly ban any government funding for conversion therapy practices within Arizona.

== Teaching restrictions ==
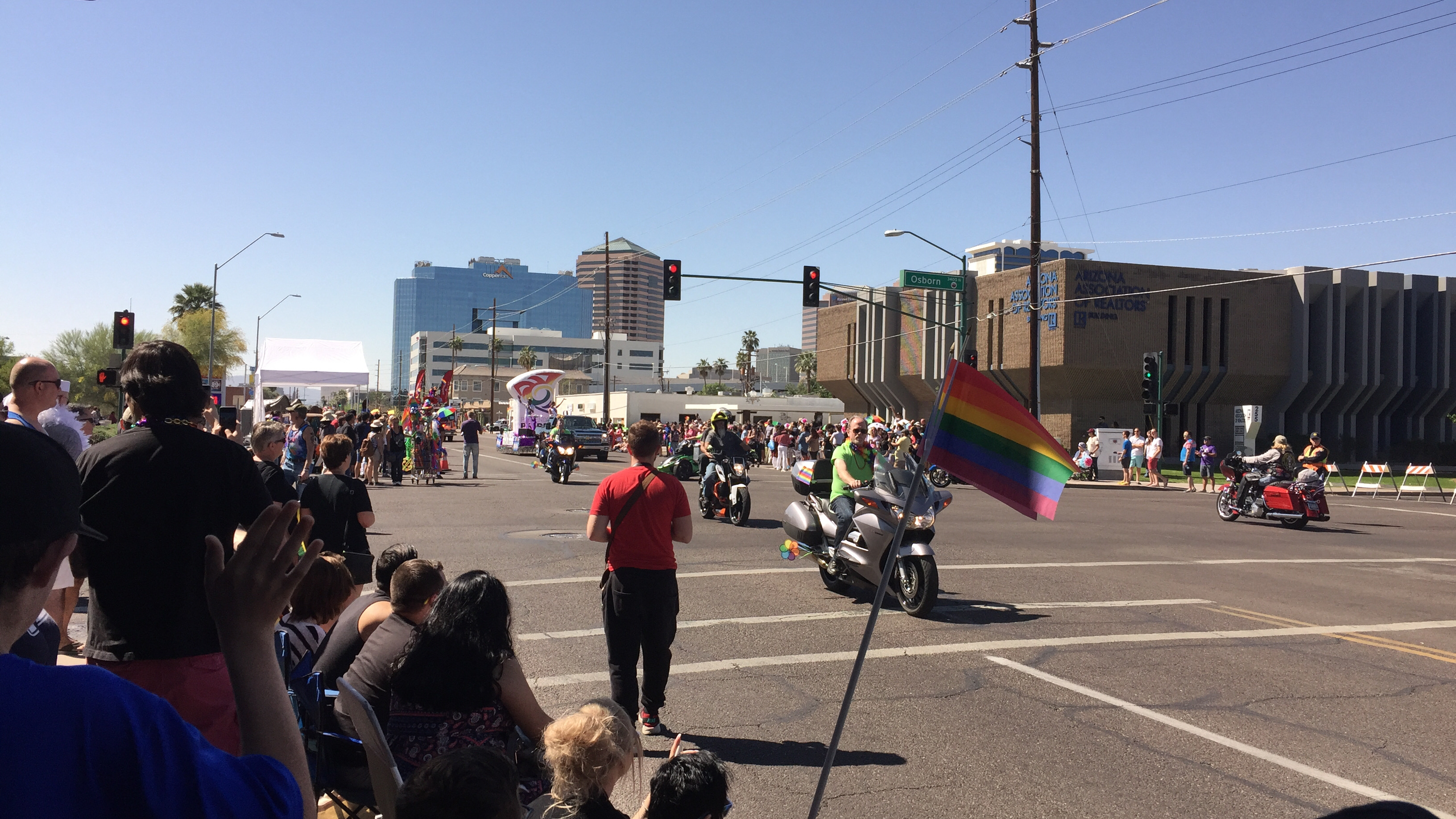
Phoenix Pride parade, 2017

=== No promo homo law repealed ===
In April 2019, the Arizona State Legislature repealed a 1991 law that prohibited AIDS- and HIV-related instruction that "promotes a homosexual life-style", "portrays homosexuality as a positive alternative life-style", or "suggests that some methods of sex are safe methods of homosexual sex." Due to several pending court cases, the constitutionality of the law was questioned. The bill passed the House by a vote of 55–5, and the Senate by a 19–10 vote. The law went into effect on July 1, 2019.

State Senator Sylvia Allen, a Republican, subsequently attempted to introduce a similar law. She proposed removing the word "homosexuality" from public school curricula and preventing any sex education before age 12. The legislation was scheduled to be heard by Arizona's Education Committee in January 2020, but the hearing was postponed so the proposal could be revised.

=== Sex education opt-in ===
On April 20, 2021, Arizona governor Doug Ducey vetoed bill SB1456, which would have limited the teaching of sex education and other matters related to gender identification and sexuality only to students whose parents had opted in. The bill had passed in the Arizona Legislature by 31-28 House vote and a 16-14 Senate vote. In June 2021, a similar sex education bill passed the Arizona Legislature - but was “watered-down” and heads straight back to the Arizona Governor Doug Ducey to either be signed into law or possibly vetoed again.

=== Banning LGBT safe spaces for schools and litigation ===
In April 2023, the Governor of Arizona vetoed a bill - that would have caused courts to be clogged up with cases regarding banning LGBT safe spaces for schools within Arizona.

== Gay and trans panic defence ==
Arizona still legally has a gay and trans panic defence under common-law. Bills have been introduced for years, but lapse due to no action within the Arizona Legislature.

== Public opinion ==
Public attitudes and opinions toward the LGBT community have evolved significantly in the past decades.

A 2003 poll commissioned by Northern Arizona University found that 54% of Arizonans opposed same-sex marriage, while 42% were in support. Subsequent polls recorded similar numbers. In 2013, a poll by Rocky Mountain Poll showed a 55% majority in favor of same-sex marriage, and opposition at 35%. Support then fell slightly to below 50% after the legalization of same-sex marriage in 2014, but then increased again, reaching 62% in 2016.

A 2017 Public Religion Research Institute (PRRI) poll found that 63% of Arizona residents supported same-sex marriage, while 28% opposed it and 9% were unsure. The same poll found that 73% of Arizonans supported an anti-discrimination law covering sexual orientation and gender identity, while 20% were opposed. Furthermore, 59% were against allowing public businesses to refuse to serve LGBTQ people due to religious beliefs, while 35% supported allowing such religiously based refusals.

Public opinion for LGBT anti-discrimination laws in Arizona
Poll source	Date(s) administered	Sample size	Margin of error	% support	% opposition	% no opinion
Public Religion Research Institute	January 2-December 30, 2019	1,160	?	71%	23%	6%
Public Religion Research Institute	January 3-December 30, 2018	1,237	?	68%	25%	7%
Public Religion Research Institute	April 5-December 23, 2017	1,444	?	73%	20%	7%
Public Religion Research Institute	April 29, 2015-January 7, 2016	1,560	?	72%	21%	7%

== Summary table ==
Same-sex sexual activity legal and equal age of consent at 18	Yes (Since 2001)
Change of sex on birth certificate and drivers licenses	Yes
Anti-discrimination laws in employment	Yes (Since 2020)
Anti-discrimination laws in housing	No / Yes (Varies)
Anti-discrimination laws in public accommodations	No / Yes (Varies)
Same-sex marriages	Yes / No (Since 2014, but constitutional ban on same sex marriage remains on the books. Explicitly banned in the Navajo Nation since 2005 and the Gila River Reservation since 2015)
Recognition of same-sex couples	Yes (Since 2014)
Stepchild and joint adoption by same-sex couples	Yes (Since 2014)
Lesbian, gay, and bisexual people allowed to serve openly in the military	Yes (Since 2011)
Transgender people allowed to serve openly in the military	No (Banned since 2025)
Intersex people allowed to serve openly in the military	(Current DoD policy bans "hermaphrodites" from serving or enlisting in the military)
Conversion therapy banned on minors	No / Yes (Pima County only and government funding statewide by a 2023 executive order implemented)
Access to IVF for lesbian couples	Yes
Surrogacy arrangements legal for gay male couples	No / Yes (Known to be performed despite statutory ban)
MSMs allowed to donate blood	Yes (Since 2023, FDA approved - no waiting period on the condition of being monogamous)
