= Präzisionsteilefertigung Steffen Pfüller =

PTF - Präzisonsteilefertigung Steffen Pfüller
- Type: Public company
- Industry: Semiconductor industry, Food industry, Laser industry, Aerospace industry
- Founded: 1992
- Headquarters: Jena, Germany; Suzhou, China, Stollberg, Germany
- Area served: Global
- Key people: Thomas Dreikorn, CEO; Oliver F. Zintl, CEO
- Products: Precision parts and high-tech assemblies
- Owner: Steffen Pfüller
- Number of employees: 137
- Website: http://www.precision-ptf.com/

Präzisionsteilefertigung Steffen Pfüller (PTF) is a producer of high-tech precision parts for companies in the semiconductor, medical, food, laser and aerospace industries.

PTF's headquarters are in Stollberg, Germany, with subsidiaries in Jena, Germany and Suzhou, China.
