= Arizona Senate Bill 1165 =

2022 law in U.S. state

Senate Bill 1165

Arizona Legislature
- Long title: AN ACT AMENDING TITLE 15, CHAPTER 1, ARTICLE 1, ARIZONA REVISED STATUTES, BY ADDING SECTION 15-120.02; RELATING TO ATHLETICS.
- Territorial extent: Arizona
- Enacted by: Arizona Senate
- Enacted: February 2, 2022
- Enacted by: Arizona House of Representatives
- Enacted: March 24, 2022
- Signed by: Doug Ducey
- Signed: March 30, 2022

Legislative history

Initiating chamber: Arizona Senate
- Introduced: January 13, 2022
- First reading: January 13, 2022
- Second reading: January 18, 2022
- Third reading: February 2, 2022
- Voting summary: 16 voted for; 13 voted against; 1 present not voting

Revising chamber: Arizona House of Representatives
- Received from the Arizona Senate: February 2, 2022
- First reading: February 28, 2022
- Second reading: March 1, 2022
- Third reading: March 24, 2022
- Voting summary: 31 voted for; 24 voted against; 5 present not voting

Summary
- Modifies the definitions of gender in relation to education and sports to prohibit people from competing in sports differing from their biological sex in all public and most private schools.
- Status: Disallowed

Arizona Senate Bill 1165 (SB 1165), also known as the Save Women's Sports Act, is a 2022 law in the state of Arizona that prohibits transgender people from competing in sports that differ from their biological sex. It was signed into law by Governor Doug Ducey on March 30, 2022, along with Senate Bill 1138, which relates to sex reassignment surgery. According to the Arizona Interscholastics Sports Medicine Advisory Committee, between 2017 and 2022, only 16 transgender students out of over 170,000 are known to have requested to be allowed to compete in sports.

A lawsuit was filed against the law in 2023, with Attorney General Kris Mayes refusing to defend the law in court. The Ninth Circuit Court of Appeals upheld the partial injunction against the law on September 9, 2024, allowing the two plaintiffs in the case to continue playing sports aligning with their gender identity. On July 3, 2025, the Supreme Court of the United States refused to hear the case, though the court agreed to hear cases from Idaho and West Virginia due to their similar laws.

== Provisions ==
Senate Bill 1165 prohibits transgender people from competing in sports that differ from their biological sex by narrowing the definition of gender in relation to education. It requires schools to designate separate male and female teams. It applies to public and private schools, but only applies to the latter if they compete against public schools in sports.

== Reactions ==
=== Support ===
Governor Ducey, who signed the bill into law, stated that it was to protect women in sports. He would go on to say that he still wanted to protect transgender people in the state. All Republican legislators in the state voted for Senate Bill 1165.

=== Opposition ===
California Attorney General Rob Bonta restricted state-funded travel to Arizona shortly following its passage. The Human Rights Campaign criticized Governor Ducey for signing the bill into law. The National Women's Law Center, along with 34 other legal firms, filed an amicus brief in opposition to the law in court. The Phoenix Union High School District approved a resolution in May 2022 opposing the law. The ACLU of Arizona also criticized Governor Ducey for signing the bill into law, referring to it as unconstitutional.

== See also ==
- LGBTQ rights in Arizona
- Transgender people in sports
- West Virginia v. B. P. J.
