= Pat Tillman Foundation =

American nonprofit organization

- Type: Nonprofit
- Industry: Education
- Founded: April 30, 2004 (22 years ago)
- Founders: Marie Tillman; Alex Garwood; Benjamin Hill; Kevin Tillman; Jared Schrieber
- Headquarters: Chicago, Illinois
- Key people: Marie Tillman (chairwoman); Dr. Katherine Steele (CEO)
- Revenue: USD $6.0 million
- Number of employees: 20 (Q1 2022)
- Website: www.ptf.org

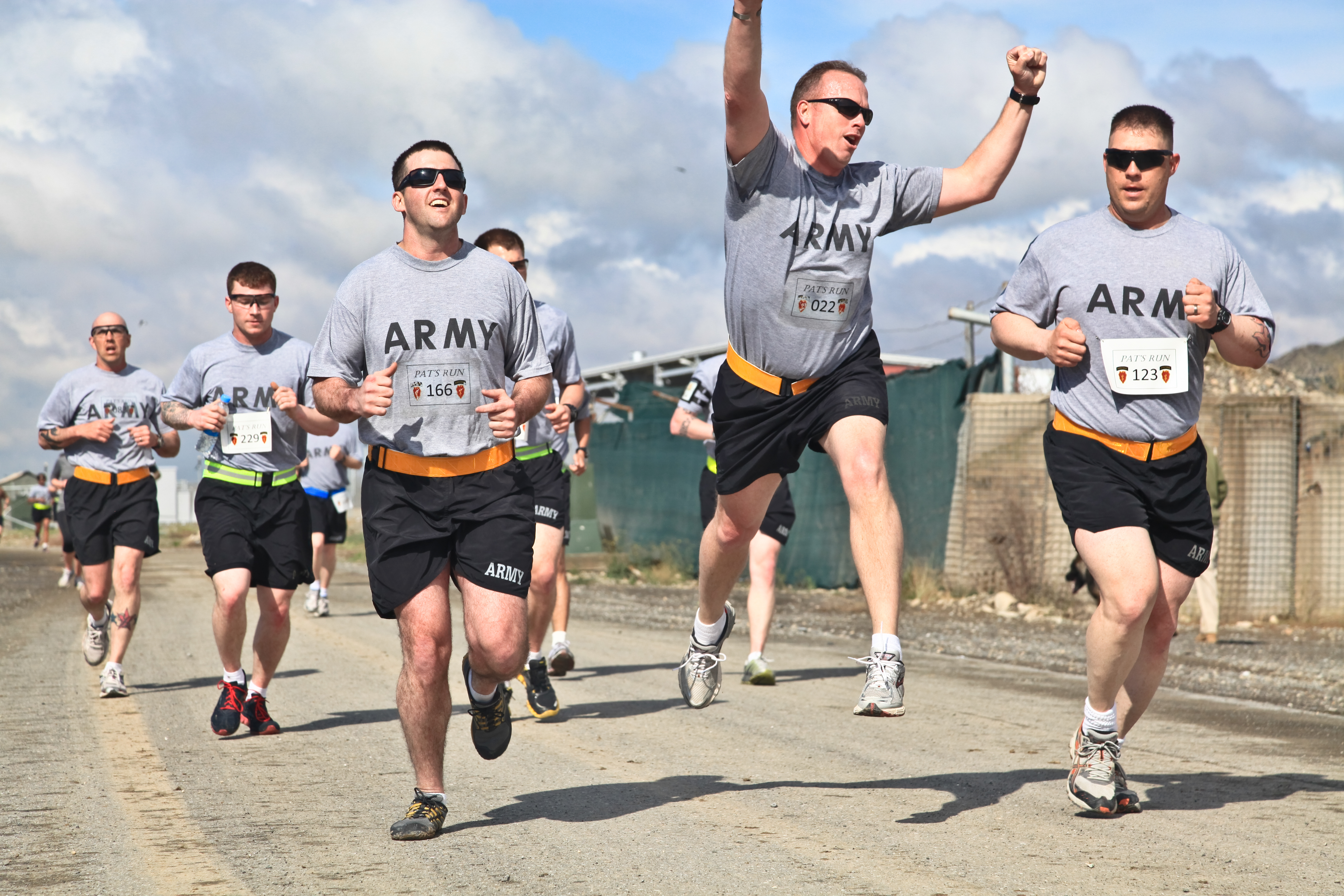
Pat Tillman Run, 2012

The Pat Tillman Foundation is a non-profit organization created in 2004 by friends and family of former Arizona Cardinals safety position American football player turned U.S. Army Ranger Pat Tillman, including his widow Marie Tillman, in the aftermath of his friendly fire death in Afghanistan. In honor of his death, The Pat Tillman Foundation was created. The foundation supports the education and leadership development of veterans and military spouses primarily through its Tillman Scholars program. The annual Pat's Run held in Tempe, Arizona since 2005 regularly draws nearly 30,000 participants every year in a 4.2 mile walk/run that finishes on the 42 yard line of Arizona State University's Sun Devil Stadium and helps fund scholarships and programs for Tillman Scholars.

== Background ==
A graduate of Arizona State University and former Pac-10 defensive player of the year, Tillman was drafted in the 7th round of the 1998 NFL draft. Turning down a $9 million offer from the St. Louis Rams because of his loyalty to Arizona, Tillman made an impact, setting the single-season Cardinals franchise record for tackles. At 27 years old, as a result of the September 11 attacks, the star safety gave up $3.6 million of his NFL contract to join the U.S. Army, where he rose to the rank of corporal. After his death, he was rewarded with the Purple Heart and Silver Star. Tillman became the first NFL player to die in combat since the Vietnam War.

== Purpose ==
The Pat Tillman Foundation is an organization that provides a support system to U.S. military families and veterans. Furthermore, their mission is to aid Tillman Scholars with academic scholarships and crucial life skills, such as leadership development, all while having an end goal of positively impacting the people and places that surround them. To ensure this foundation is properly supported and runs smoothly, the Leadership Through Action Program was created. The program is mainly focused on carrying out the legacy of Pat Tillman, which is to inspire others to serve a purpose bigger than themselves. To make this possible, the program supplies “the inspiration, tools, and experience to help tomorrow’s leaders identify problems and social ills that touch them, develop potential solutions to those problems, test the solutions, and ultimately implement those solutions with the funding from the foundation or community”. Overall, Pat Tillman Foundation has invested more than $24 million in academic support since 2008, and has named 800+ Tillman Scholars at more than 166 academic institutions nationwide. The program relies on instructors, mentors, and coaches around the world.

== Tillman Scholars Program ==
The Tillman Scholars Program has scholarships that provide students with anything related to their studies, such as their tuition and book expenses. Every year 60 Tillman Scholars are selected from approximately 2,000 applicants, resulting in a 3% selection rate and marking the Tillman Scholarship as selective and competitive. In order to receive this distinguished honor, an individual must “demonstrate extraordinary academic and leadership potential and a deep desire to create positive change through their work in the fields of medicine, law, business, policy, technology, education, and the arts”.

== Notable Tillman Scholars ==
- Jonny Kim, 2012 Tillman Scholar (Harvard University, MD)
- Jamal Sowell, 2014 Tillman Scholar (Indiana University, JD)
- Dr. Katherine Steele, 2014 Tillman Scholar (Vanderbilt University, EdD) CEO of the Pat Tillman Foundation 2024-Present
- Jason Everman, 2015 Tillman Scholar (Norwich University, M.A., Military History)
- Adrian Perkins, 2015 Tillman Scholar (Harvard University, JD)
- Edward Byers, 2019 Tillman Scholar (University of Pennsylvania, MBA)
- Brad Snyder, 2020 Tillman Scholar (Princeton University, PhD)
