= Ronald Torbert =

American football official (born 1964)

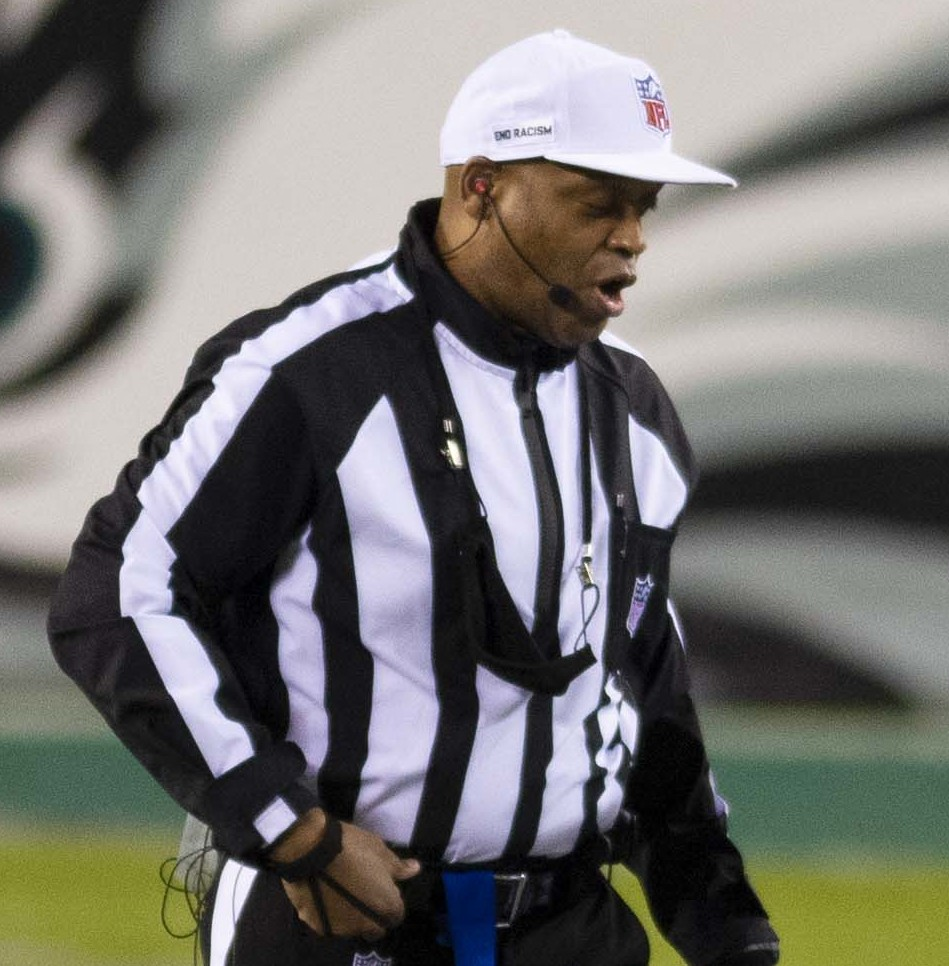
- Torbert in 2021
- Born: January 1, 1964 (age 62); Youngstown, Ohio, U.S.
- Education: Michigan State University; Harvard Law School (JD)
- Occupation: NFL official (2010–present)
- Spouse: Melanie Torbert (m. 1990)
- Children: 2

Ronald Torbert (born January 1, 1964) is an American professional football official in the National Football League (NFL). He has been an official since the 2010 NFL season. He wears uniform number 62.

== Early life ==
After graduating from South High School in Youngstown, Ohio, Torbert graduated from Michigan State University and then attended Harvard Law School where he earned a JD. At Harvard, Torbert was president of the Harvard Legal Aid Bureau.

== Career ==
Torbert began his NFL officiating career in 2010 as a side judge before becoming a referee in the 2014 NFL season after Scott Green and Ron Winter announced they were retiring. Torbert is one of eight African-American referees in NFL history, after Johnny Grier, Mike Carey, Jerome Boger, and Don Carey; he preceded Shawn Smith, Adrian Hill, and Tra Blake.

Torbert was the alternate referee for Super Bowl LIII. He is also featured in the NFL 100-year anniversary video which aired during that Super Bowl.

On January 25, 2022, Torbert was named the referee for Super Bowl LVI. On January 21, 2025, he was named the referee for Super Bowl LIX.

=== 2024 crew ===
- R: Ron Torbert
- U: Barry Anderson
- DJ: Frank LeBlanc
- LJ: Brian Bolinger
- FJ: Ryan Dickson
- SJ: Keith Washington
- BJ: Tony Josselyn
- RO: Mike Chase
- RA: Jamie Alfieri-Tuss

== Personal life ==
Outside of his NFL officiating job, Torbert was an attorney, retiring in 2019. With his wife Melanie, he has a son and a daughter.
