= Super Bowl LVIII =

2024 National Football League championship game

San Francisco 49ers (1) (NFC) (12–5)	Kansas City Chiefs (3) (AFC) (11–6)
22	25
Head coach: Kyle Shanahan	Head coach: Andy Reid
	1	2	3	4	OT	Total
SF	0	10	0	9	3	22
KC	0	3	10	6	6	25
- Date: February 11, 2024
- Kickoff time: 3:40 p.m. PST (UTC-8)
- Stadium: Allegiant Stadium; Paradise, Nevada (Note: The game was originally scheduled to be played at the Mercedes-Benz Superdome in New Orleans, Louisiana.)
- MVP: Patrick Mahomes, quarterback
- Favorite: 49ers by 2
- Referee: Bill Vinovich
- Attendance: 61,629

Ceremonies
- National anthem: Reba McEntire
- Coin toss: Lahainaluna Lunas football head coach Bobby Watson
- Halftime show: Usher, featuring Alicia Keys, Jermaine Dupri, H.E.R., will.i.am, Lil Jon, and Ludacris

TV in the United States
- Network: TV: CBS; Univision (Spanish); Nickelodeon (Alternative broadcast); Streaming: Paramount+ Vix (Spanish)
- Announcers: CBS: Jim Nantz (play-by-play); Tony Romo (analyst); Tracy Wolfson and Evan Washburn (sideline reporters); Jay Feely (special teams analyst); Gene Steratore (rules analyst); Nickelodeon: Noah Eagle (play-by-play); Nate Burleson, SpongeBob SquarePants, (Note: Voiced by Tom Kenny) and Patrick Star (Note: Voiced by Bill Fagerbakke) (analysts); Sandy Cheeks, (Note: Voiced by Carolyn Lawrence) Dylan Gilmer, and Dylan Schefter (sideline reporters); Univision: Ramses Sandoval (play-by-play); Memo Schutz (analyst); Martín Gramática (contributor)
- Nielsen ratings: 43.5 (national); U.S. TV viewership: 123.7 million
- Cost of 30-second commercial: $7 million

Radio in the United States
- Network: Westwood One
- Announcers: Kevin Harlan (play-by-play); Kurt Warner (analyst); Laura Okmin and Mike Golic (sideline reporters); Dean Blandino (rules analyst)

Super Bowl LVIII was an American football game played to determine the champion of the National Football League (NFL) for the 2023 season between the National Football Conference (NFC) champion San Francisco 49ers and the American Football Conference (AFC) champion and defending Super Bowl champion Kansas City Chiefs. In a rematch of Super Bowl LIV four years earlier and also featuring the second overtime in Super Bowl history, the Chiefs would defeat the 49ers again 25–22. It was the longest Super Bowl in NFL history, with a net playing time of 74 minutes and 57 seconds. The game was played on February 11, 2024, at Allegiant Stadium in Paradise, Nevada, being the first Super Bowl to be held in the state of Nevada. Kansas City quarterback Patrick Mahomes was named Super Bowl MVP for the third time in his career, completing 34 of 46 passes for 333 yards, two touchdowns, and an interception.

Kansas City received its fourth Super Bowl title in the franchise's sixth appearance and second consecutive, becoming the first team since the 2004 New England Patriots to repeat as champions. The Chiefs posted an 11–6 record and the AFC's 3rd seed for the season. San Francisco was handed its third consecutive Super Bowl loss after Super Bowls XLVII and LIV. The latter entered the game with a 12–5 record and NFC's top seed, and the franchise's eighth Super Bowl appearance. In addition, the 49ers were seeking their sixth Super Bowl title, which would have put the franchise in a three-way tie with the New England Patriots and Pittsburgh Steelers for most Super Bowl Championships.

The game began with the two teams exchanging possessions until the second quarter, where a trick play culminated in 49ers runningback Christian McCaffrey increasing San Francisco's score to 10–3 by halftime. However, in the third quarter, following the Chiefs' second field goal and subsequent punt, the ball was fumbled and recovered by Kansas City after it bounced off the shoe of 49ers' cornerback Darrell Luter Jr., which set up the Chiefs in the red zone to take the lead at 13–10. The 49ers responded with a touchdown drive that carried into the fourth quarter, with an extra point attempt by 49ers kicker Jake Moody getting blocked by Chiefs linebacker Leo Chenal, leaving the score 16–13 with 11:20 left in regulation. Following several successful field goal attempts by both teams, the game went into overtime as the Chiefs' fourth successful field goal by kicker Harrison Butker ended regulation to tie the score once again at 19–19. In overtime, San Francisco won the coin toss and elected to first possess the ball. They were then stalled at the Chiefs' 9-yard-line, opting to settle for a field goal, making the score 22–19. During Kansas City's overtime possession, Mahomes led a 75-yard drive. The game was then subsequently decided in its final play, nicknamed "Tom and Jerry", as Mahomes threw the ball to wide receiver Mecole Hardman, who ran toward the sideline during the pre-snap and walked the ball into the endzone, three seconds away from an unprecedented second overtime and concluding the game at 25–22.

It was the second overtime in Super Bowl history, the first being Super Bowl LI in 2017. The game was also the first Super Bowl to use the new overtime rules implemented during the 2022 season, and the first Super Bowl since its inception that George Toma did not serve as groundskeeper. The game's sellout attendance of 61,629 was the smallest unrestricted crowd in Super Bowl history due to the seating capacity of Allegiant Stadium, and the smallest unrestricted NFL Championship attendance since December 1946 (58,346).

Super Bowl LVIII is considered one of the greatest Super Bowls of all time by several sports outlets, with many citing the performances of both teams, the game's overtime finish, in addition to the game cementing the Chiefs as a dynasty. It was the second simulcast in Super Bowl history, and the first since Super Bowl I. The game's broadcast on CBS, youth-oriented Nickelodeon, and Spanish-language network Univision became the most watched program in American television history at the time and is currently the third most-watched American television broadcast of all time, with a total of 123.7 million average viewers across all platforms. In addition, the game produced the highest unduplicated total audience in television history at 200 million viewers watching all or part of the game, becoming the most-watched United States broadcast since the Apollo 11 moon landing. This continued an upward viewing trend that would be broken again the following year. The halftime show, headlined by Usher, peaked at 129 million viewers.

The Chiefs reached the Super Bowl once again in 2025 for a third consecutive year in a bid for an unprecedented three-peat in the Super Bowl era, but ultimately lost to the Philadelphia Eagles, 40–22.

== Background ==
=== Host selection ===
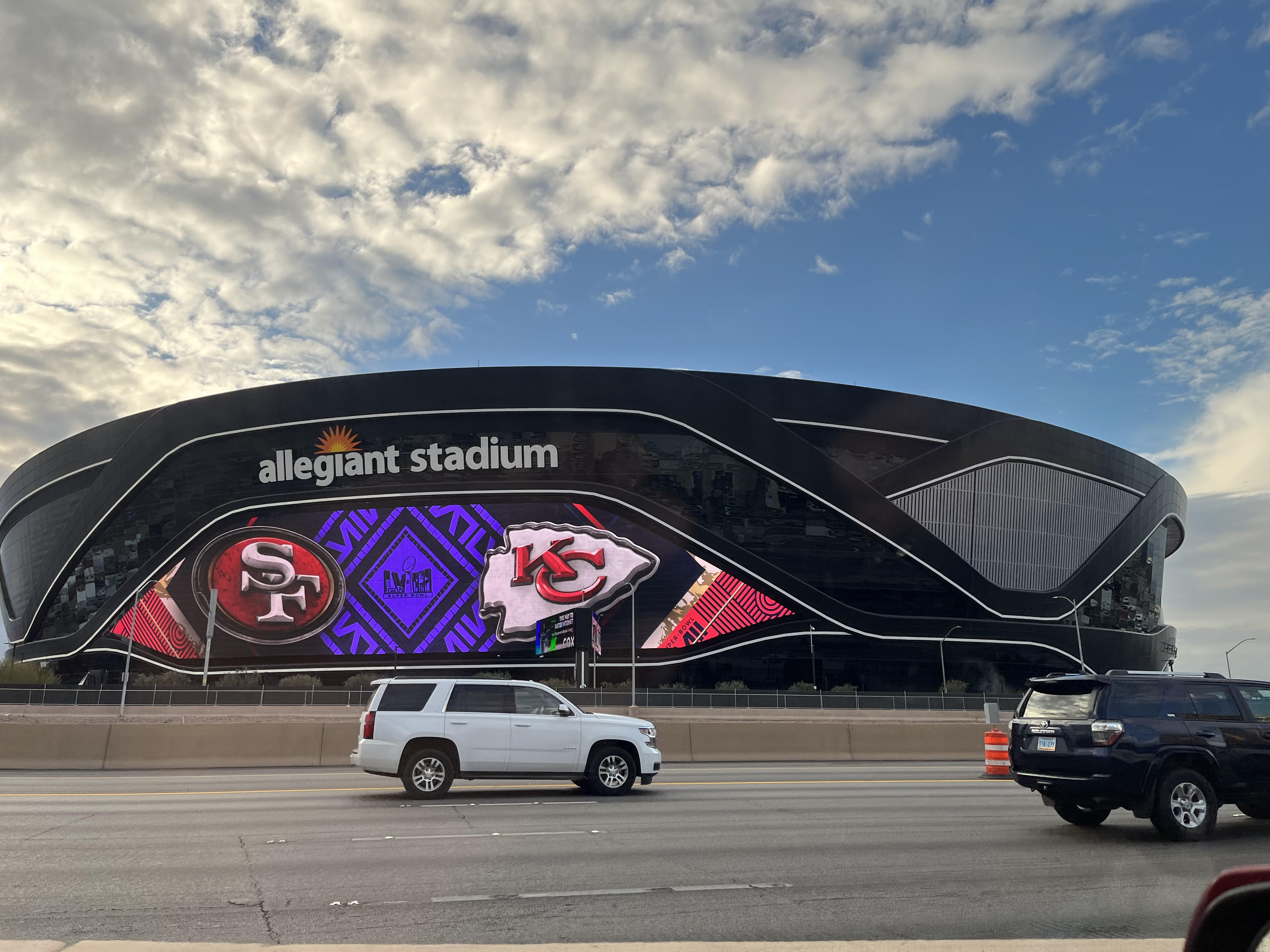
Allegiant Stadium, February 2024

On May 23, 2018, the NFL picked the Mercedes-Benz Superdome in New Orleans to host Super Bowl LVIII. The league picked the winning city from a list of candidates that it had compiled, a process that replaced an earlier one in which cities that wished to host a Super Bowl submitted bids to be debated and voted upon at the league owners' meetings.

In March 2020, the NFL and the NFL Players Association agreed to expand the regular season from 16 to 17 games beginning in 2021, pushing Super Bowl LVIII from February 4, 2024, to February 11, and causing a conflict with the city's Mardi Gras celebrations.

The NFL announced on October 14, 2020, that New Orleans would host Super Bowl LIX instead of Super Bowl LVIII, and then announced on December 15, 2021, that Allegiant Stadium was chosen as the new site.

=== Logo ===
The official logo was unveiled on February 13, 2023; it follows the updated logo template established by Super Bowl LVI, with the traditional Roman numerals containing imagery reflecting the host city/region—in this case, a sunset behind the skyline of the Las Vegas Strip and the Las Vegas sign. The numerals were also slanted inward to evoke the architecture of resorts such as the Bellagio and Wynn Las Vegas. The unveiling of this logo was met with acclaim, with many praising its originality and its effective representation of the host city's spirit amid the standardized designs used since 2011.

== Teams ==
=== San Francisco 49ers ===
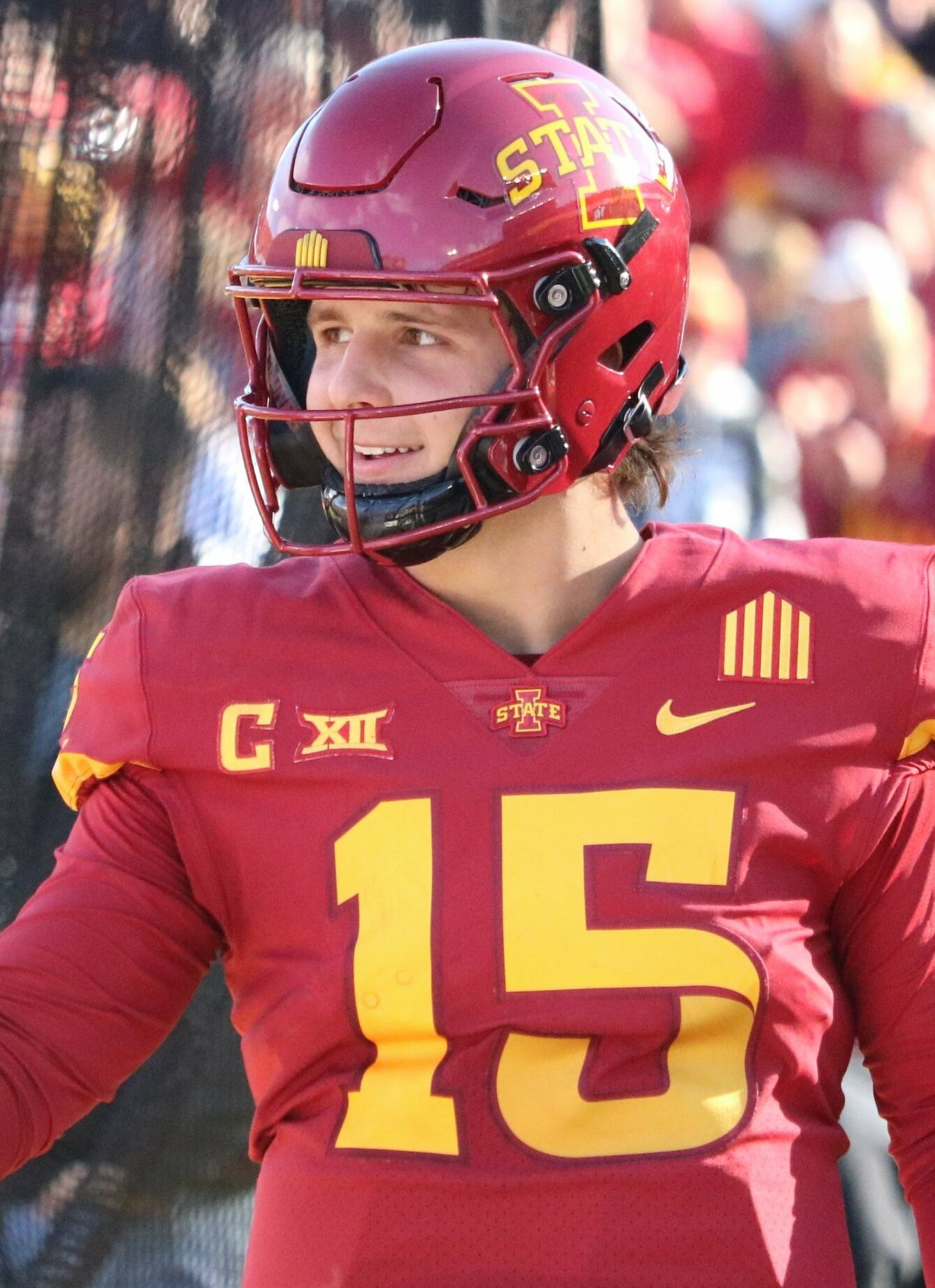
Brock Purdy was the third-youngest quarterback to start a Super Bowl. (Purdy pictured in 2021 with the Iowa State Cyclones)

Under seventh-year head coach Kyle Shanahan, the San Francisco 49ers ended the 2023 season with a 12–5 record, the NFC's No. 1 seed, and a first-round bye.

Following the success of rookie quarterback Brock Purdy, who led them to an NFC Championship Game the previous season, the 49ers traded away Trey Lance, the third overall pick in the 2021 NFL draft, and made Purdy the full-time starter. In his first full season as the starter, Purdy was named to the Pro Bowl, throwing for 4,280 yards, 31 touchdowns, and 11 interceptions and finished with a passer rating of 113.0, the highest in the league. The offense was also led by first-team All-Pro running back Christian McCaffrey, whom the 49ers acquired midway through the 2022 season. He led the league in scrimmage yards (2,023) and total touchdowns (21). San Francisco's receiving core was led by Brandon Aiyuk, George Kittle, and Deebo Samuel, all of whom gained more than 1,000 scrimmage yards. The 49ers were the first team in league history to have four players with over 1,000 scrimmage yards. The 49ers' offense finished second in the league in total offense with 398.4 yards per game, which included finishing fourth in pass yards per game (257.9) and third in rush yards per game (140.5). The offensive line was spearheaded by left tackle Trent Williams, who received his third First-team All-Pro selection and his 11th Pro Bowl nomination.

On defense, the 49ers finished third in the league in scoring defense, giving up 17.5 points per game, and finished first in the league with 22 interceptions (tied with the Chicago Bears). San Francisco's defensive line featured Pro Bowl defensive end Nick Bosa, who led the team with 10.5 sacks, along with defensive tackle Javon Hargrave (seven sacks) and Arik Armstead (five sacks). First-team All-Pro linebacker Fred Warner led the team with 132 combined tackles, four interceptions, four forced fumbles, and 2.5 sacks. The secondary was led by second-team All-Pro cornerbacks Charvarius Ward (five interceptions and 72 tackles) and Deommodore Lenoir (three interceptions, 84 tackles).

This game marked the 49ers' eighth Super Bowl appearance. The franchise won its first five Super Bowl appearances (XVI, XIX, XXIII, XXIV, and XXIX) but lost its last two before this game (XLVII and LIV). If the 49ers won the game, they would have been the first NFC team to win six Super Bowls and the third team overall, joining the New England Patriots and Pittsburgh Steelers.

=== Kansas City Chiefs ===
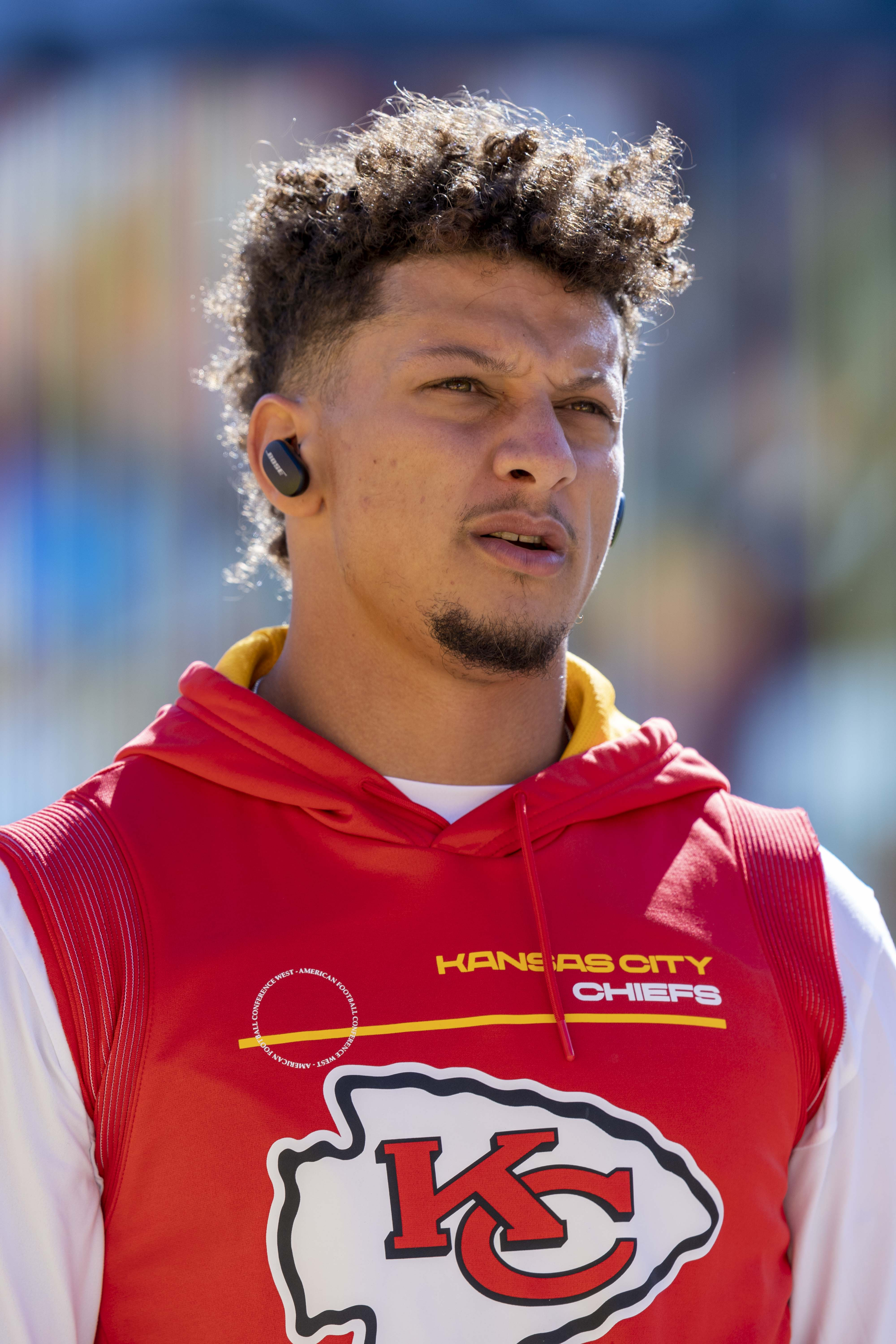
With quarterback Patrick Mahomes, the Chiefs were trying to become the first back-to-back Super Bowl champions since 2005. (Mahomes pictured in 2021)

Kansas City entered the 2023 NFL season as defending Super Bowl champions, having won Super Bowl LVII. They finished the 2023 season with an 11–6 record, their 11th consecutive winning season and eighth consecutive AFC West title under eleventh-year head coach Andy Reid, and as the No. 3 seed in the AFC.

In his sixth season as the starter, quarterback Patrick Mahomes had his worst statistical season in several categories, including yards per attempt (7.0), passing yards per game (261.4), interceptions (14), and passer rating (92.6). His receivers struggled at several points throughout the season, and going into week 18, the Chiefs led the league in dropped passes. Despite this, Mahomes set a career-high in completion percentage with 67.2% while throwing for 27 touchdowns. Tight end Travis Kelce led the Chiefs in receiving yards for the fourth time in five seasons, but finished with under 1,000 receiving yards for the first time since 2015. Rookie receiver Rashee Rice led the Chiefs' wide receivers with 938 yards and seven touchdowns, while second-year running back Isiah Pacheco ran for 935 yards and seven touchdowns. The offensive line featured two Pro Bowl selections: guard Joe Thuney and center Creed Humphrey.

The Chiefs' defensive line featured Pro Bowl defensive tackle Chris Jones, who had 10.5 sacks, and defensive end George Karlaftis (10.5 sacks). The secondary was led by cornerbacks L'Jarius Sneed (two interceptions, 78 tackles, 14 pass deflections) and All Pro Trent McDuffie (80 tackles, 5 forced fumbles, 3 sacks), along with safety Justin Reid (team-high 95 tackles, 1 interception, 3 sacks).

Super Bowl LVIII was the Chiefs' sixth Super Bowl appearance and fourth in the past five seasons. Entering the game, the Chiefs had won three Super Bowls (IV, LIV, and LVII) and lost two (I and LV). The Chiefs also won one pre-Super Bowl era AFL Championship, in 1962 (as the Dallas Texans).

=== Playoffs ===
As the No. 1 seed in the NFC, the 49ers received a first-round bye. In the NFC Divisional Round, the 49ers hosted the No. 7 seed Green Bay Packers. Although the Packers took a 21–14 lead heading into the fourth quarter, the 49ers rallied to win the game 24–21 thanks to a late game-winning drive led by Brock Purdy that ended with a touchdown by Christian McCaffrey. Linebacker Dre Greenlaw sealed the game for the 49ers by intercepting quarterback Jordan Love on the Packers' final drive. This allowed the 49ers to advance to their third straight NFC Championship Game and their fourth in the last five seasons. In that game, the 49ers hosted the No. 3 seed Detroit Lions. The 49ers fell behind quickly, trailing 24–7 at halftime. They scored 27 straight points to take a 34–24 lead late in the fourth quarter. The Lions scored one more touchdown after that but failed to recover the ensuing onside kick attempt, sending the 49ers to their second Super Bowl in five seasons with a 34–31 win.

As the No. 3 seed in the AFC, the Chiefs hosted the No. 6 seed Miami Dolphins in the AFC Wild Card Round. Due to a cold wave in mid-January, the temperature was −4 °F (−20 °C) at this game's kickoff, which was the fourth-coldest in NFL history. The Chiefs defeated the Dolphins 26–7. The Dolphins' only points in the game came from a touchdown pass from quarterback Tua Tagovailoa to former Chiefs wide receiver Tyreek Hill. The win saw the Chiefs play their first away playoff game in the Mahomes era, the AFC Divisional Round against the No. 2 seed Buffalo Bills. This game saw five lead changes between the two teams. The Chiefs won 27–24 as Buffalo kicker Tyler Bass missed a potential game-tying field goal wide right in the final two minutes. With that win, the Chiefs advanced to their sixth straight AFC Championship Game, which they played on the road against the No. 1 seed Baltimore Ravens. Miscues on both offense and defense doomed the Ravens; the Chiefs led 17–7 at halftime and came up with big defensive stops in the second half to win 17–10. The Chiefs advanced to their fourth Super Bowl in five seasons.

=== Pre-game notes ===
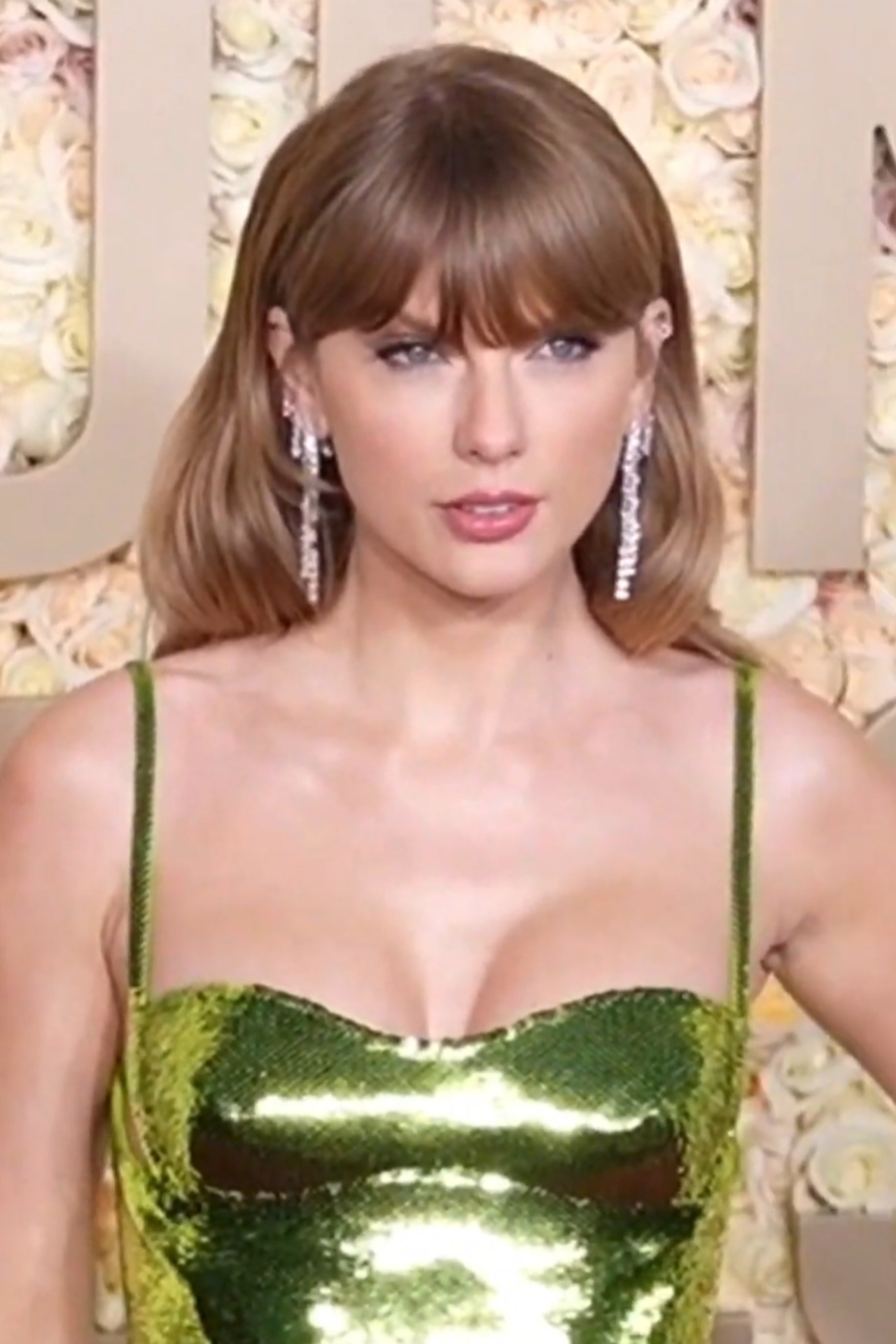
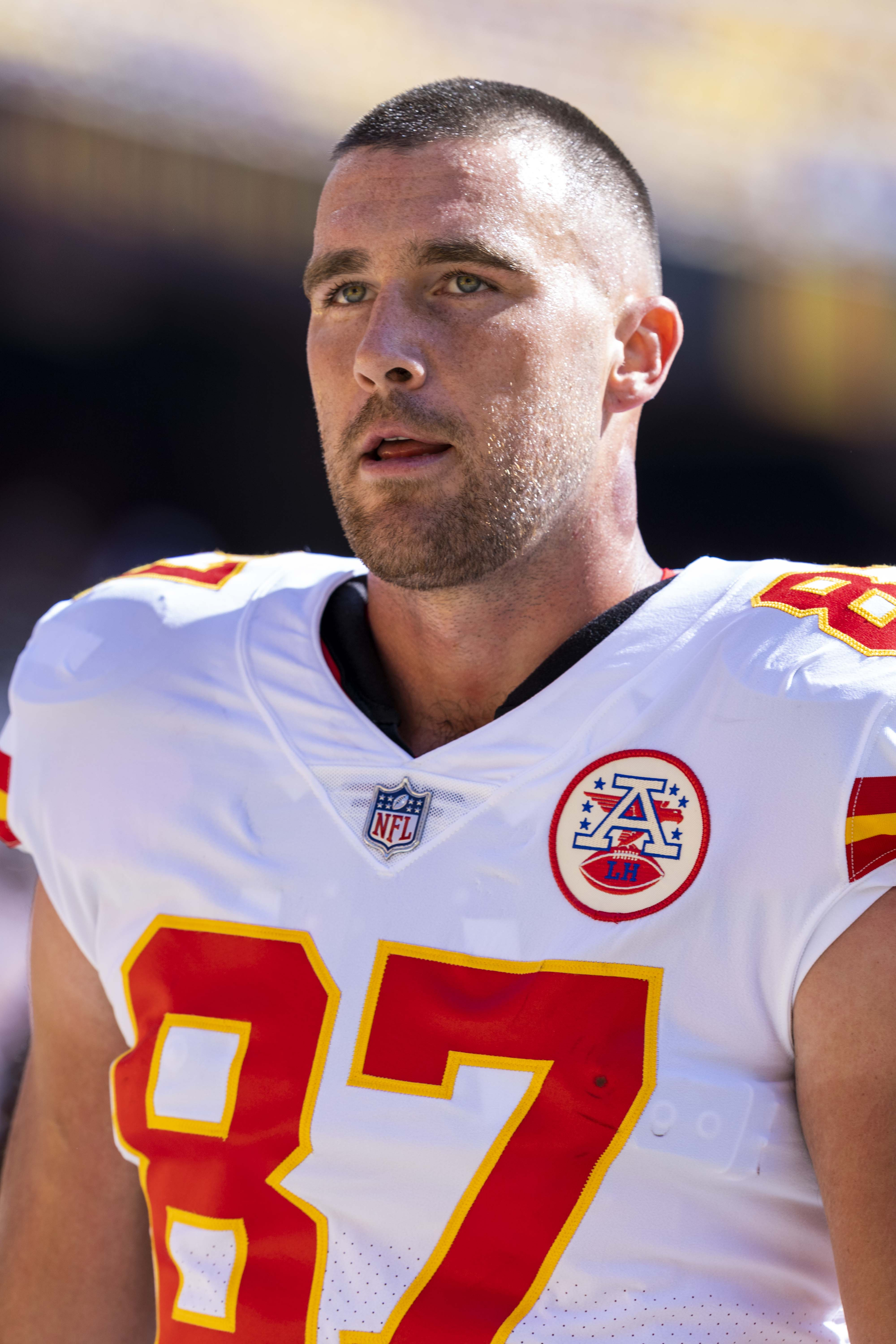
The relationship between Taylor Swift (left) and Chiefs tight end Travis Kelce (right) attracted significant media attention prior to the game.

As the designated home team in the Super Bowl's annual rotation between the two conferences, the Chiefs chose to wear their red home jerseys with white pants. The 49ers wore their white away jerseys with gold pants.

As the designated home team, the Chiefs practiced at the host team Las Vegas Raiders' practice facility in Henderson, Nevada, during the week leading up to the game. The 49ers practiced at UNLV's Fertitta Football Complex in Paradise, Nevada. Both teams stayed off-Strip at luxury hotels at the Lake Las Vegas resort area east of the city, with the Chiefs staying at the Westin and the 49ers staying at the Hilton.

The game was a rematch of Super Bowl LIV (played in February 2020), in which the Chiefs defeated the 49ers, 31–20, overcoming a 10-point fourth-quarter deficit. Mahomes was named the MVP of that Super Bowl. Bill Vinovich was also the referee for that game, making him the first referee to preside over two Super Bowl meetings between the same teams. This was also the third meeting between teams from Kansas City and the San Francisco Bay Area for a major professional sports championship, which previously occurred in the 2014 World Series and the aforementioned Super Bowl LIV.

This game was also the first since Super Bowl LV to feature the defending champion. That game saw the defending champion Chiefs fall to the Tampa Bay Buccaneers.

The game was dubbed by fans and media outlets as the "Taylor Swift Bowl" or "Swiftie Bowl", referencing singer-songwriter Taylor Swift and her fans, which are known as Swifties. The season broke viewership, merchandise, and ticket sales records for the NFL, following Swift's relationship with Chiefs tight end Travis Kelce and her frequent appearances at Chiefs games. Fans who began supporting the Chiefs due to Swift's association with them have been dubbed as "Chiefties".

As has been the case with the Chiefs in many nationally televised and publicized games in the past, some Indigenous groups used the high profile of Super Bowl LVIII to call on the team to change its name and for their fans to end the use of the tomahawk chop.

== Broadcasting ==
=== United States ===
==== Television ====
Super Bowl LVIII was televised by CBS, the network's 22nd broadcast of the game. It was the first Super Bowl to be broadcast under the new 11-year NFL television contract, which began a four-year rotation between CBS, Fox, NBC, and ABC/ESPN.

CBS used 165 cameras, including six embedded within the goal posts ("doink cams"), 48 for high-frame-rate video (24 of which were in 4K for zooming), and 23 for augmented reality effects. Robotic cameras were placed in the city at The Strat, Planet Hollywood Las Vegas, Mandalay Bay, and the Renaissance Las Vegas; another camera ran on a wire over the Bellagio fountains. CBS televised the game in 1080p with high-dynamic-range (HDR) color, upconverted to 4K UHD on Paramount+ and participating television providers. CBS built a studio set in front of the Bellagio fountains, from which it broadcast CBS Sports Network and CBS Sports HQ programs during Super Bowl week, as well as editions of CBS Mornings and The Talk. The NFL Today began its pre-game coverage from the studio, then moved to sets outside Allegiant Stadium, then into the stadium as kickoff time approached.

CBS's lead broadcast team of Jim Nantz (play-by-play), Tony Romo (color commentary), Tracy Wolfson (sideline reporter), and Gene Steratore (rules analyst) called their third Super Bowl together, joined by additional sideline reporter Evan Washburn and special teams analyst Jay Feely. The pre-game show featured CBS Sports personalities Kyle Brandt, James Brown, Nate Burleson, Bill Cowher, Charles Davis, Ian Eagle, Boomer Esiason, Jonathan Jones, Jason McCourty, Matt Ryan, Phil Simms, and J. J. Watt. The series premiere of Tracker aired after the game. After late local programming, CBS also aired special Sunday-night episodes of The Late Show with Stephen Colbert and After Midnight.

TelevisaUnivision announced in May 2023 that it had reached an agreement with CBS to carry Super Bowl LVIII via TUDN; the TUDN division was represented at the game by both Univision and Mexican network Canal 5, which produced separate broadcasts for each territory. Ramses Sandoval, Memo Schutz, and Martín Gramática were the broadcast team for Univision. CBS also carried Spanish commentary via SAP on the main broadcast. CBS had previously sub-licensed the Spanish-language rights to its last three Super Bowl games to ESPN Deportes.

On August 1, 2023, CBS Sports announced that it would carry a youth-oriented alternate broadcast of the game on Paramount Global sister network Nickelodeon; the network has aired alternate broadcasts of select NFL games since 2021, but this was the first such broadcast for a Super Bowl. Billed as Super Bowl LVIII: Live from Bikini Bottom, the broadcast incorporated SpongeBob SquarePants-themed augmented reality effects and features (in addition to those seen on previous games aired by the network), and live appearances by characters from the series (such as "analysts" SpongeBob SquarePants and Patrick Star, along with "sideline reporter" Sandy Cheeks) accompanying announcers Noah Eagle and Nate Burleson. Nickelodeon aired the series premiere of Rock Paper Scissors after the game.

==== Advertising ====
CBS charged $6.5 million to $7 million for a 30-second commercial, remaining steady with the previous year's game. Several health and beauty brands bought ads during the game, with analysts suggesting that these buys may have been motivated by Taylor Swift's presence at the game, and the potential for increased viewership by women. FanDuel's ad following their second "Kick of Destiny" featured a posthumous appearance by actor Carl Weathers, who died on February 1, 2024. Most of the advertising time sold by CBS also included airtime on the Nickelodeon simulcast, and selected advertisers were given opportunities to participate in promotional initiatives incorporating Nickelodeon personalities. Commercials for products inappropriate for children (such as alcohol, gambling, and R-rated films) were not carried; Paramount Global sold about 15 Nickelodeon-specific advertising slots for $200,000 to $300,000 each to replace these ads.

Amid the AI boom, a number of commercials advertised AI-related products and services, including Crowdstrike, Etsy's "Gift Mode" (powered by OpenAI GPT-4), Microsoft Copilot, and AI-based photo editing features on Google Pixel 8 smartphones. Generative AI was satirized by a tease for Despicable Me 4 depicting an AI art generator that was actually being run by minions. A super PAC supporting 2024 presidential candidate Robert F. Kennedy Jr. aired a spot, which called back to his uncle, John F. Kennedy’s campaign, during the game. Kennedy faced criticism from family members and friends who argued that the ad "exploits and potentially tarnishes the legacy of a storied political family". Chinese online marketplace Temu showed their spot five times during and shortly after the game.

Beyoncé starred in a Verizon commercial co-starring actor Tony Hale; after trying to "break the internet" in various ways to no avail, she concluded the commercial by declaring "Okay, they ready. Drop the new music". At that time, the singer posted a teaser video on Instagram for her next studio album.

A Vrbo commercial (which had aired 17 days prior to the game) was criticized by Newfoundland and Labrador over the misappropriation of the folk song "I's the B'y" in a scene set in a vacation rental out of a farmhouse that is overcrowded with animals. The provincial government demanded that the commercial be removed from Canadian television; Vrbo apologized on February 15 and announced that it would follow through doing so.

Disney, 20th Century Studios, Universal Pictures and Paramount Pictures unveiled trailers for their upcoming films during the game, including Deadpool & Wolverine, Inside Out 2, Kingdom of the Planet of the Apes, Wicked, Twisters, Monkey Man, The Fall Guy, Kung Fu Panda 4, IF and Bob Marley: One Love.

The Super Bowl Ad Meter survey conducted by USA Today was won by State Farm for their ad "Like a Good Neighbaaa" starring Arnold Schwarzenegger and Danny DeVito.

==== Streaming ====
The game streamed on Paramount+ in English, on TelevisaUnivision's Vix in Spanish, in addition to the paid NFL+ app.

==== Radio ====
Westwood One held the national radio rights to the game, airing it on their various affiliates. The broadcast team featured booth announcers Kevin Harlan (play-by-play) and Kurt Warner (analyst), sideline reporters Mike Golic and Laura Okmin, and rules analyst Dean Blandino. Entravision broadcast the game in Spanish. Annually, over 25 million people listen to the Super Bowl via radio broadcast.

The game was also broadcast in the competing teams' home markets by their flagship radio stations with their local announcers. KNBR 104.5 and 680 aired the 49ers' call of the game with Greg Papa and Tim Ryan, while 106.5 The Wolf carried the Chiefs' call with Mitch Holthus, Danan Hughes, and Josh Klinger.

=== International ===
Super Bowl LVIII was broadcast in more than 150 countries on every continent except Antarctica, including:

==== Americas ====
- In Canada, the game's broadcast rights were owned by Bell Media. The game was televised in English on TSN and CTV, subject to simultaneous substitution; RDS carried the French broadcast of the game. Additionally, the game was streamed on TSN+ and DAZN. The Nickelodeon broadcast was shown exclusively on TSN+ and was not shown by YTV or Nickelodeon Canada, as those channels are owned by competitor Corus Entertainment.
- In Latin and South America, the game was televised by ESPN and its streaming and on-demand platform Star+ in Spanish. English language commentary was available on ESPN 3 across Latin America.
- In the Caribbean, the game was broadcast on ESPN.
- In Mexico, the game was televised by ESPN, Canal 5 and simulcast on ViX and Televisa, Fox Sports and simulcast on Amazon Prime Video, and Azteca 7 all in Spanish. Dedicated English language commentary was available on ESPN 3 and English SAP via Fox Sports.
- In Brazil, the game was televised by ESPN and RedeTV! and its streaming and on demand platforms Star+ in Portuguese (with English SAP) and NFL Game Pass on DAZN in English.
- In Argentina, the game was televised by ESPN and Fox Sports 2 (under a sublicense due to a divestiture order from the Government of Argentina).

==== Europe ====
- In the United Kingdom, the game was televised on the free-to-air ITV network and streaming service ITVX (STV Player in Scotland), and on pay channels Sky Sports NFL, Sky Sports Main Event, Sky Sports Mix, Sky Showcase, and Sky's on-demand and streaming service Now. It was carried on radio via talkSPORT, BBC Sport Online, BBC Radio 5 Live, and BBC Sounds.
- In Ireland, the game was televised on Sky Sports NFL, Sky Sports Main Event, Sky Sports Mix, Sky Showcase, and Sky's on-demand and streaming service Now. It was also carried on Virgin Media One and Two, and broadcast on radio by RTÉ Radio 1.
- In Portugal and Belgium, the game was televised by Eleven Sports.
- In Germany, Austria, Switzerland, Luxembourg, and Liechtenstein, the game was televised for the first time by RTL Group (RTL, Nitro), following the broadcasting right transfer from previous rights-holder ProSieben. It was also shown on DAZN.
- In France, Andorra, Monaco, and some French Overseas Territories, the game was televised by M6 and BeIN Sports.
- In Spain, the game was televised by Movistar Plus+.
- In Italy, the game was televised by Mediaset's channel Italia 1 and its streaming and on-demand platform DAZN with NFL Game Pass International.
- In Denmark, the game was televised by TV 2.
- In Norway, the game was televised by VGTV.
- In Sweden and Finland, the game was televised by a channel within the TV4-sphere and its streaming service TV4 Play (previously known as C More). Additionally, MTV televised the game in Finland only.
- In Iceland, the game was televised by Stöð 2 Sport.
- In Poland, the game was televised by free-to-air station Polsat, its first Super Bowl broadcast. The game also aired on Polsat's sister sports station, Polsat Sport, and streamed on Polsat Box Go and DAZN (only for NFL Game Pass subscribers).
- In Czechia and Slovakia, the game was televised by Premier Sport.
- In Hungary, the game was televised by Arena 4 and streaming service NET4+.
- In Bosnia and Herzegovina, Croatia, Kosovo, Montenegro, North Macedonia, Serbia, and Slovenia, the game was televised by Arena Sport.
- In Bulgaria, the game was televised by Max Sport 2.
- In Greece, the game was televised by Cosmote.
- In Cyprus, the game was televised by Cytavision.
- In Turkey, the game was televised by S Sport.
- In Romania, the game was televised by Digi Sport.
- In The Netherlands, the game was televised by ESPN.

==== Asia–Pacific ====
- In Australia, the game was televised by the Seven Network as well as its sister channel 7mate and on demand platform 7+ with CBS broadcast feed. The game was also shown on ESPN, Kayo Sports, and NFL Game Pass on DAZN, but the Nickelodeon broadcast was not shown due to the channel being owned by competitor Ten Network Holdings and its parent company Paramount Australia.
- In New Zealand, the game was televised by TVNZ 1 and its streaming and on-demand platform TVNZ+, as well as ESPN through Sky Sport and NFL Game Pass on DAZN.
- Across the Pacific Islands, the game was televised by ESPN.
- In China, the game was televised by Tencent and on multiple regional networks.
- In Japan, the game was televised by Nippon TV's sister channel Nittele G+ and NFL Game Pass on DAZN.
- In Hong Kong, the game was televised by Now Sports.
- In the Indian subcontinent, the game was televised by Star Sports and streaming service Disney+ Hotstar.
- In South Korea, the game was televised by Coupang Play and NFL Game Pass on DAZN.
- In Taiwan, the game was televised for the first time by ELTA Sports, which also marks the return of NFL games coverage for the Chunghwa Telecom MOD platform.
- In the Philippines, the game was televised by Premier Sports and its streaming and on-demand platform Blast TV.
- In Thailand, the game was televised by TrueVisions.
- In Indonesia, Singapore, and Malaysia, the game was televised by over-the-top streaming service Mola.
- In Vietnam, the game was televised by K+.

==== Middle East and Africa ====
- Across Sub-Saharan Africa, the game was televised by ESPN across multiple different providers including DStv, GOtv, and StarTimes.
- In Israel, the game was televised by METV and Sport 5.
- In Saudi Arabia and across the Middle East and North Africa the game was televised by SSC and streaming service Shahid.

== Entertainment ==
=== Pregame ===
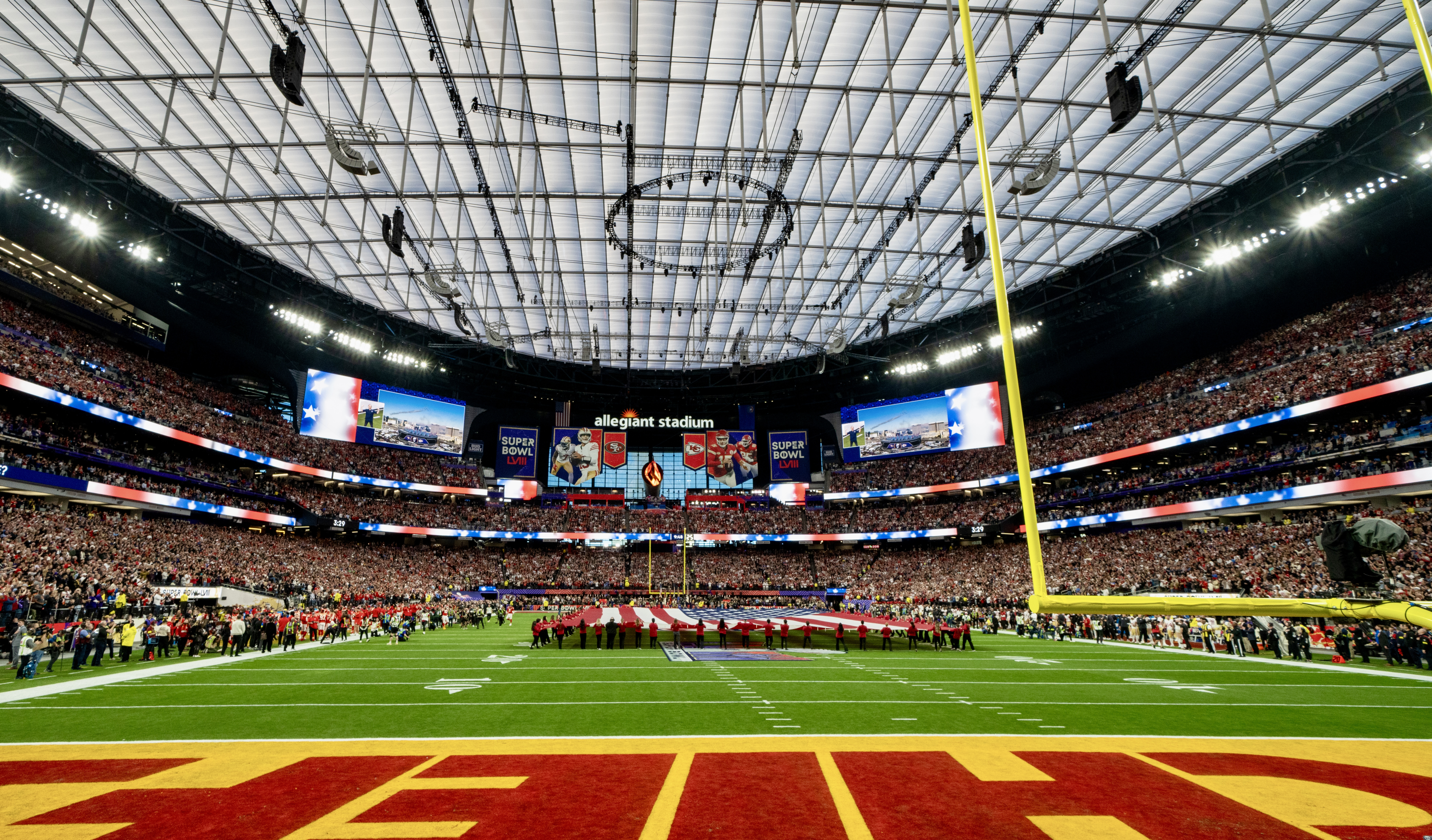
The American Flag out on the field for the national anthem

On January 18, 2024, the NFL announced that country music singer Reba McEntire would perform the U.S. national anthem. Actor Daniel Durant performed the national anthem in American Sign Language. In addition, rapper Post Malone performed "America the Beautiful" and R&B singer Andra Day accompanied by six female backup singers performed "Lift Every Voice and Sing", with actress Anjel Piñero and actor Shaheem Sanchez performing both songs in ASL. The anthem was concluded with a flyover by the U.S. Air Force Thunderbirds demonstration team in their custom painted F-16C Fighting Falcons.

Electronic music artist Kaskade performed before and during the game, making him the first DJ to perform throughout the Super Bowl. He replaced Tiësto, who dropped out after a family emergency.

The NFL invited players and coaches from Lahainaluna High School in Lahaina, Hawaii, to serve as honorary captains during the coin toss ceremony. Lahaina was one of the communities ravaged by the 2023 Hawaii wildfires.

=== Halftime ===
Usher was the leading performer in the Super Bowl LVIII Halftime Show. (Usher pictured in 2010)

On September 24, 2023, it was announced that R&B and pop singer Usher would headline the halftime show.

Usher's performance included the songs "Caught Up", "U Don't Have to Call", "Love in This Club", "Confessions Part II", "Nice & Slow", "Burn", "U Got It Bad", "OMG", and "Yeah!" (with interpolations of "Freek-a-Leek" by Petey Pablo and "Get Low" by Lil Jon). The show also featured surprise appearances by Alicia Keys, will.i.am, Lil Jon, Ludacris, H.E.R, and Sonic Boom of the South.

== Game summary ==
External videos
- Full game broadcast on CBS on YouTube

=== First half ===
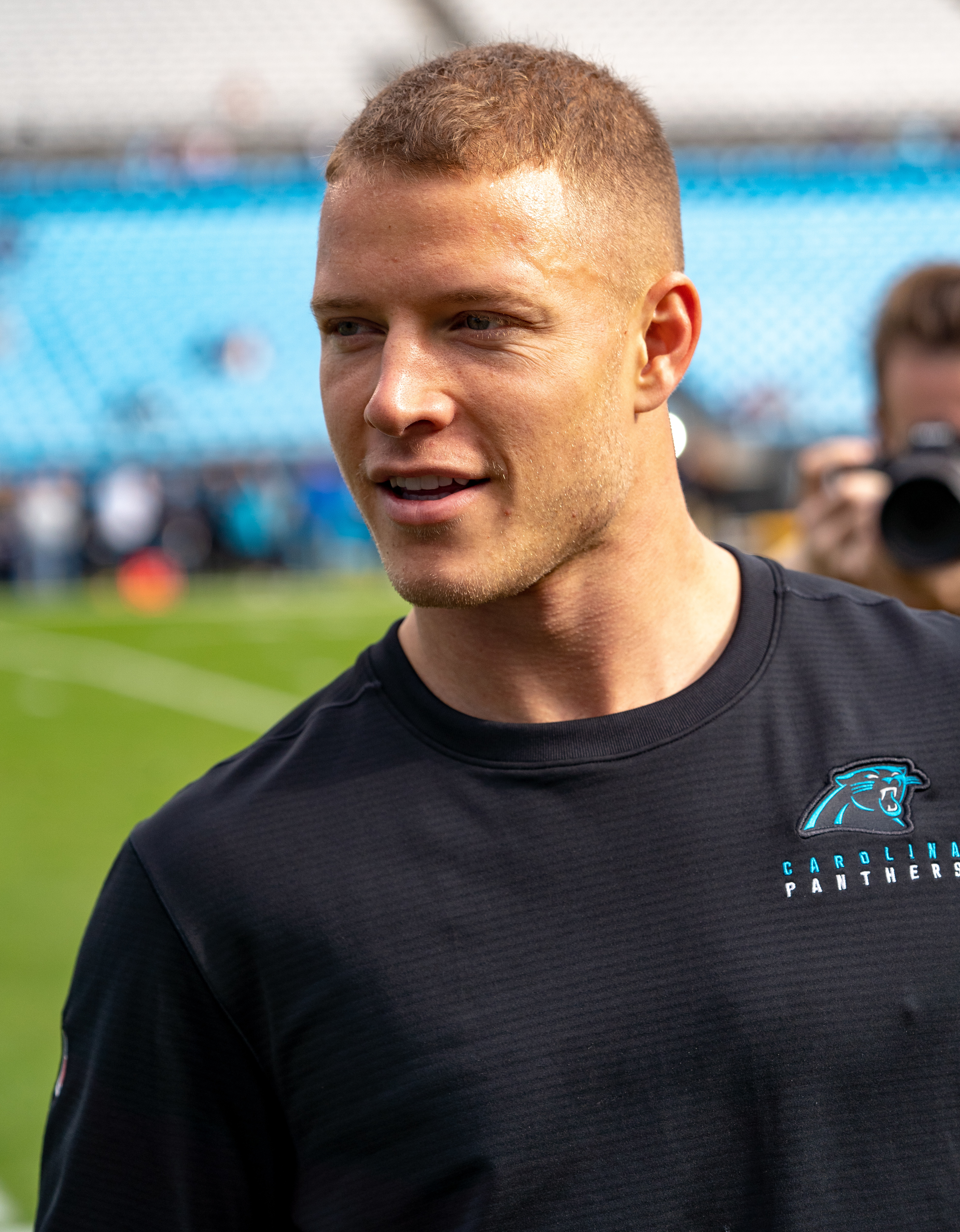
Christian McCaffrey caught the 49ers' first touchdown of the game. (McCaffrey pictured in 2019 with Carolina)

After the Chiefs won the coin toss and deferred possession to the second half, the 49ers received the opening kickoff, which was a touchback. The 49ers' opening drive gained 46 yards in four plays, which included quarterback Brock Purdy completing an 18-yard pass to fullback Kyle Juszczyk, while running back Christian McCaffrey picked up 28 yards on two runs and a reception to reach the Kansas City 29-yard line. On the next play, however, linebacker Leo Chenal forced a fumble from McCaffrey, and defensive end George Karlaftis recovered it on the 27-yard line, ending the drive and giving the Chiefs possession.

After the next three possessions ended in punts, San Francisco put together a 10-play, 46-yard drive that began at their own 17-yard line. With Purdy completing back-to-back passes to wide receivers Chris Conley and Ray-Ray McCloud for gains of 18 and 19 yards, respectively, the 49ers reached the Kansas City 37-yard line, where kicker Jake Moody made a 55-yard field goal to take a 3–0 lead on the second play of the second quarter. It set the record for the longest field goal made in a Super Bowl, surpassing Buffalo Bills kicker Steve Christie's 54-yard field goal in Super Bowl XXVIII.

The Chiefs began their next drive at their own 25-yard line. Quarterback Patrick Mahomes completed a 52-yard strike to wide receiver Mecole Hardman to set up 1st-and-goal at the San Francisco 9-yard line. But on the next play, cornerback Deommodore Lenoir stripped the ball from running back Isiah Pacheco, with defensive tackle Javon Hargrave making the recovery.

After an exchange of punts, the 49ers mounted an eight-play, 67-yard drive that featured a 12-yard reception by wide receiver Deebo Samuel and an unnecessary roughness penalty against cornerback L'Jarius Sneed. Two plays after Sneed's penalty, the 49ers ran a trick play to score; Purdy threw a backwards pass to wide receiver Jauan Jennings, who then threw it to McCaffrey from one side of the field to the other, who then outran the defense for a 21-yard touchdown reception, increasing San Francisco's lead to 10–0 with 4:23 remaining in the first half.

Kansas City responded with a 13-play, 65-yard drive that featured Mahomes completing six of seven pass attempts, which included a 21-yard completion to wide receiver Justin Watson and three passes to wide receiver Rashee Rice for 20 total yards, while Pacheco picked up 28 yards on two runs and two receptions. The drive ended with a 28-yard field goal by kicker Harrison Butker, cutting the score to 10–3 with 20 seconds remaining in the half. Purdy took a knee to send the teams into their respective locker rooms at halftime.

=== Second half ===
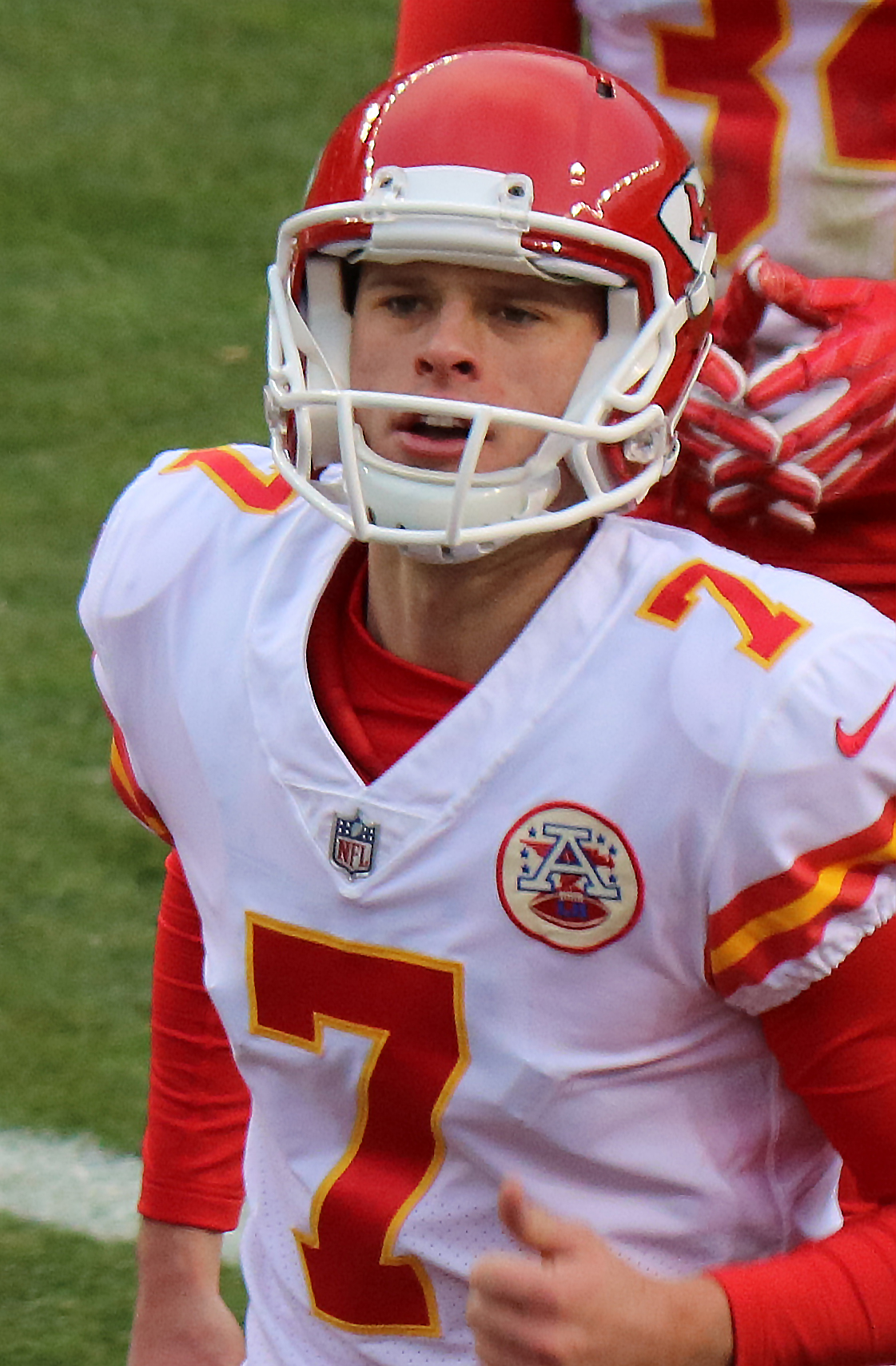
Harrison Butker successfully kicked a Super Bowl record-setting 57-yard field goal in the third quarter. (Butker pictured in 2017)

Three plays into the Chiefs' first possession of the second half, Mahomes overthrew a pass intended for tight end Travis Kelce that was intercepted by safety Ji'Ayir Brown, giving the 49ers possession at the Kansas City 44-yard line. Despite starting inside of Kansas City territory, San Francisco went three-and-out after losing a yard on their possession, but Mitch Wishnowsky delivered a 43-yard punt that was downed at the Kansas City 2-yard line by Conley. Following this, the teams traded three-and-outs.

With 9:02 remaining in the third quarter, the Chiefs received the ball at their own 14-yard line. Aided by an 11-yard reception by Kelce and a 22-yard scramble by Mahomes, Kansas City went on a nine-play, 47-yard drive that ended with a 57-yard field goal by Butker, cutting their deficit to 10–6 and breaking Moody's record-setting 55-yard field goal from earlier in the game.

After forcing the 49ers to another three-and-out, the Chiefs were forced to another one of their own, but Tommy Townsend's 40-yard punt bounced off 49ers cornerback Darrell Luter Jr.'s foot, and Chiefs cornerback Jaylen Watson recovered the ball at the San Francisco 16-yard line, thereby giving Kansas City possession inside the red zone. On the following play, the Chiefs scored on a 16-yard touchdown pass from Mahomes to wide receiver Marquez Valdes-Scantling, giving them their first lead of the game, 13–10.

The 49ers responded with a 75-yard drive in 12 plays, which carried over into the fourth quarter. The drive was highlighted by Purdy's 17-yard pass to Jennings and wide receiver Brandon Aiyuk's 20-yard reception on the first play of the fourth quarter before Purdy finished the drive with a 10-yard touchdown pass to Jennings, making the latter the second player in Super Bowl history to both throw and catch a touchdown pass after Philadelphia Eagles quarterback Nick Foles in Super Bowl LII. Moody's extra point attempt was blocked by Chenal, but the 49ers had retaken the lead, 16–13, with 11:22 left in regulation.

The Chiefs countered with a 12-play drive of their own, this one covering 69 yards. Mahomes completed two passes to Kelce for 29 yards, then a 25-yard pass to Justin Watson before Pacheco rushed twice for 17 yards to set up 1st-and-goal at the San Francisco 4-yard line. However, they could not get into the end zone and had to settle for Butker's 24-yard field goal to tie the game at 16–16 with 5:46 left.

San Francisco responded by moving the ball down the field, which started with a 23-yard completion from Purdy to Jennings, then they continued to run the ground game until they faced 3rd-and-5 on the Kansas City 35-yard line at the two-minute warning. After the break, a blitz forced Purdy to throw an incompletion, stopping the clock and forcing Moody to convert a 53-yard field goal, giving the 49ers a 19–16 lead with 1:53 remaining.

Kansas City began their final drive of regulation on their own 25-yard line with two timeouts and a chance to either win the game with a touchdown or force overtime with a field goal. Mahomes started the drive with a 9-yard pass to Kelce, then picked up 3 yards on a scramble before completing back-to-back passes to tight end Noah Gray and Justin Watson for gains of 12 and 8 yards, respectively, to reach the San Francisco 43-yard line. After an incompletion stopped the clock with 48 seconds remaining, Mahomes threw a 7-yard pass to running back Jerick McKinnon, who was tackled in bounds by Brown, forcing the Chiefs to burn their second timeout. Mahomes then picked up 3 yards on a scramble, then threw another incomplete pass, bringing up 3rd-and-7 on the 33-yard line with 16 seconds left. On the next play, Mahomes threw a 22-yard pass to Kelce to reach the 11 with 10 seconds on the clock, and the Chiefs were spared their third timeout when Brown was taken out of the game due to an injury he sustained while tackling Kelce. After that, Mahomes attempted to connect with Kelce in the end zone, but failed as Kelce was covered by linebacker Fred Warner. With six seconds remaining, Butker kicked a 29-yard field goal to tie the game again at 19–19, and Purdy ran out the remaining three seconds to send the game to overtime.

=== Overtime ===
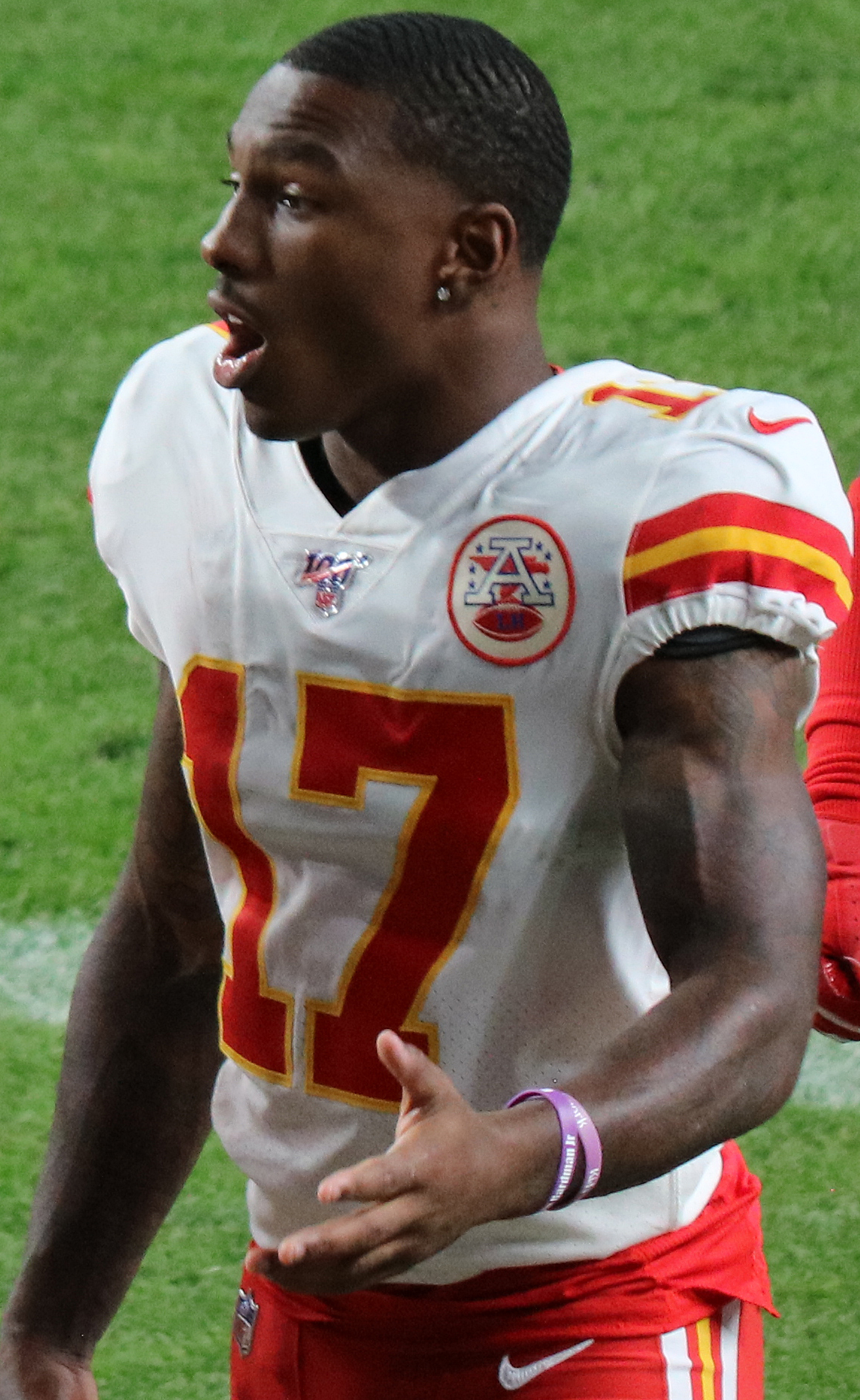
Mecole Hardman caught a 3-yard game-winning touchdown pass in overtime. (Hardman pictured in 2019 as #17)

The 49ers won the overtime coin toss and elected to receive. They quickly faced 3rd-and-13 and Purdy threw an incomplete pass on the next play, but cornerback Trent McDuffie was called for holding, allowing San Francisco to continue their drive. They advanced the ball into Kansas City territory with McCaffrey catching a 24-yard pass and rushing five times for 26. The drive stalled on the 9-yard line, so Moody kicked a 27-yard field goal to give his team a 22–19 lead. The Chiefs responded by driving 75 yards in 13 plays, which included two receptions by Rice for 19 yards and two runs by Mahomes for 27, the first of which was an 8-yard scramble on 4th-and-1. After completing a 7-yard pass to Kelce to set up 1st-and-goal on the San Francisco 3-yard line, Mahomes completed the game-winning touchdown pass to Hardman, giving Kansas City a 25–22 victory. This was Hardman's only touchdown of the season and the first Super Bowl in which the lead changed hands on the final play of the game.

This was the first playoff game to go to overtime since the NFL changed the overtime rules for playoff games prior to the 2022 season so that both teams get at least one chance to possess the ball in overtime even if a touchdown is scored on the initial possession. Several 49ers players admitted after the game that they were unaware of the rule change, with Arik Armstead stating that he and other players learned of the change at the beginning of the overtime period when it was displayed on the Allegiant Stadium video screen. The rule change did not affect the outcome of the game; since the 49ers scored a field goal on the initial possession, the Chiefs would still have had an opportunity to possess the ball under the pre-2022 rules.

The game lasted for 74 minutes and 57 seconds of game time, making it the longest Super Bowl and 7th longest NFL postseason game ever.

Mahomes completed 34 of his 46 pass attempts for 333 yards with two touchdowns and one interception and was named the Super Bowl MVP for the third time in his career. He also ran for 66 yards. McCaffrey was the top rusher of the game with 22 carries for 80 yards. He also led the 49ers with eight catches for 80 yards and a receiving touchdown. The top receiver of the game was Kelce, with nine catches for 93 yards.

=== Box score ===
Super Bowl LVIII – San Francisco 49ers vs Kansas City Chiefs – Game summary

Quarter	1	2	3	4	OT	Total
49ers (NFC)	0	10	0	9	3	22
Chiefs (AFC)	0	3	10	6	6	25

at Allegiant Stadium, Paradise, Nevada

- Date: February 11, 2024
- Game time: 3:40 p.m. PST
- Game weather: N/A (indoor stadium)
- Game attendance: 61,629
- Referee: Bill Vinovich
- TV announcers (CBS/Paramount+—traditional broadcast, Nickelodeon—kids broadcast):
  CBS/Paramount+:
  Jim Nantz, Tony Romo, Tracy Wolfson, Evan Washburn, and Jay Feely
  Nickelodeon:
  Noah Eagle, Nate Burleson, Dylan Gilmer, Dylan Schefter, and various Nickelodeon characters
- Recap, Game Book

Scoring summary

Quarter	Time	Drive			Team	Scoring information	Score	
Quarter	Time	Plays	Yards	TOP	Team	Scoring information	SF	KC
2	14:48	10	46	4:05	SF	55-yard field goal by Jake Moody	3	0
2	4:23	8	67	3:26	SF	Christian McCaffrey 21-yard touchdown reception from Jauan Jennings, Moody kick good	10	0
2	0:20	13	65	4:03	KC	28-yard field goal by Harrison Butker	10	3
3	5:01	9	47	4:01	KC	57-yard field goal by Butker	10	6
3	2:28	1	16	0:04	KC	Marquez Valdes-Scantling 16-yard touchdown reception from Patrick Mahomes, Butker kick good	10	13
4	11:22	12	75	6:06	SF	Jennings 10-yard touchdown reception from Brock Purdy, Moody kick failed (blocked)	16	13
4	5:46	12	69	5:36	KC	24-yard field goal by Butker	16	16
4	1:53	7	40	3:53	SF	53-yard field goal by Moody	19	16
4	0:03	11	64	1:50	KC	29-yard field goal by Butker	19	19
OT	7:22	13	66	7:38	SF	27-yard field goal by Moody	22	19
OT	0:03	13	75	7:19	KC	Mecole Hardman 3-yard touchdown reception from Mahomes	22	25
"TOP" = time of possession. For other American football terms, see Glossary of American football.							22	25

== Final statistics ==
=== Statistical comparison ===
Team-to-team comparison
Statistic	San Francisco 49ers	Kansas City Chiefs
First downs	23	24
First downs rushing	5	9
First downs passing	15	15
First downs penalty	3	0
Third down efficiency	3–12	9–19
Fourth down efficiency	1–1	1–1
Total net yards	382	455
Net yards rushing	110	130
Rushing attempts	31	30
Yards per rush	3.5	4.3
Yards passing	272	325
Passing–completions/attempts	24–39	34–46
Times sacked–total yards	1–4	3–8
Interceptions thrown	0	1
Punt returns–total yards	2–0	4–12
Kickoff returns–total yards	0–0	0–0
Interceptions–total return yards	1–0	0–0
Punts–average yardage	5–50.8	5–50.8
Fumbles lost	2	1
Penalties–yards	6–40	6–55
Time of possession	38:31	36:26
Turnovers	2	2

Records set (Unless noted as "NFL Championships", "Single Postseason" or "Pro Football History", all records refer only to Super Bowls)
Longest game	74:57	
Longest field goal (record set and broken in the same game)	55	Jake Moody (San Francisco)
Longest field goal (2)	57	Harrison Butker (Kansas City)
Most field goals, career	9	Harrison Butker (Kansas City)
Most 50-yard field goals made, game	2	Jake Moody (San Francisco)
Most 50-yard field goals made, career	2	Jake Moody (San Francisco); Harrison Butker (Kansas City)
Highest punting average	50.8	Tommy Townsend (Kansas City) (5 – 254 yds)
Highest punting average	50.8	Mitch Wishnowsky (San Francisco) (5 – 254 yds)
Most fumbles recovered, career	4	Patrick Mahomes (Kansas City)
Most rushing yards by a quarterback, career	172	Patrick Mahomes (Kansas City)
Most field goals made, combined	7	Kansas City (4) San Francisco (3)
Fewest kickoff returns, combined	0	
Lowest stadium audience attendance (unrestricted)	61,629	Super Bowl LVIII
Records tied
Most Super Bowl games with TD pass and TD reception	1	Jauan Jennings (San Francisco)
Most field goals made, game	4	Harrison Butker (Kansas City)
Most field goals attempted, career	10	Harrison Butker (Kansas City)
Most fumbles, career	5	Patrick Mahomes (Kansas City)
Most field goals attempted, combined	7	San Francisco (3) Kansas City (4)
Most field goals made, team	4	Kansas City

=== Individual statistics ===
San Francisco statistics
49ers passing
	C/ATT^{1}	Yds	TD	INT	Rating
Brock Purdy	23/38	255	1	0	89.3
Jauan Jennings	1/1	21	1	0	158.3
49ers rushing
	Car^{2}	Yds	TD	Lg^{3}	Yds/Car
Christian McCaffrey	22	80	0	11	3.6
Brock Purdy	3	12	0	9	4.0
Deebo Samuel	3	8	0	9	2.7
Elijah Mitchell	2	8	0	7	4.0
Kyle Juszczyk	1	2	0	2	2.0
49ers receiving
	Rec^{4}	Yds	TD	Lg^{3}	Target^{5}
Christian McCaffrey	8	80	1	24	8
Jauan Jennings	4	42	1	23	5
Brandon Aiyuk	3	49	0	20	6
Deebo Samuel	3	33	0	12	11
Kyle Juszczyk	2	31	0	18	2
George Kittle	2	4	0	4	3
Ray-Ray McCloud	1	19	0	19	1
Chris Conley	1	18	0	18	1

Kansas City statistics
Chiefs passing
	C/ATT^{1}	Yds	TD	INT	Rating
Patrick Mahomes	34/46	333	2	1	99.3
Chiefs rushing
	Car^{2}	Yds	TD	Lg^{3}	Yds/Car
Patrick Mahomes	9	66	0	22	7.3
Isiah Pacheco	18	59	0	10	3.3
Rashee Rice	2	5	0	3	2.5
Clyde Edwards-Helaire	1	0	0	0	0.0
Chiefs receiving
	Rec^{4}	Yds	TD	Lg^{3}	Target^{5}
Travis Kelce	9	93	0	22	10
Rashee Rice	6	39	0	13	8
Isiah Pacheco	6	33	0	8	6
Mecole Hardman	3	57	1	52	3
Justin Watson	3	54	0	25	5
Marquez Valdes-Scantling	3	20	1	16	5
Noah Gray	2	22	0	12	2
Jerick McKinnon	2	15	0	8	2
Richie James	0	0	0	0	1

^{1}Completions/attempts
^{2}Carries
^{3}Long gain
^{4}Receptions
^{5}Times targeted

== Starting lineups ==
Starting lineups for Super Bowl LVIII
San Francisco	Position		Kansas City
Offense
Deebo Samuel	WR		Rashee Rice
Trent Williams	LT		Donovan Smith
Aaron Banks	LG		Nick Allegretti
Jake Brendel	C		Creed Humphrey
Jon Feliciano	RG		Trey Smith
Colton McKivitz	RT		Jawaan Taylor
George Kittle	TE		Travis Kelce
Kyle Juszczyk	FB	TE	Noah Gray
Brandon Aiyuk	WR		Marquez Valdes-Scantling
Brock Purdy	QB		Patrick Mahomes
Christian McCaffrey	RB		Isiah Pacheco
Defense
Chase Young	DE		Mike Danna
Arik Armstead	DT		Chris Jones
Javon Hargrave	DT		Mike Pennel
Nick Bosa	DE		George Karlaftis
Dre Greenlaw	LB		Nick Bolton
Fred Warner	LB		Leo Chenal
Oren Burks	LB		Willie Gay
Deommodore Lenoir	CB		Trent McDuffie
Charvarius Ward	CB		L'Jarius Sneed
Ji'Ayir Brown	S		Justin Reid
Tashaun Gipson	S		Mike Edwards

== Officials ==
Super Bowl LVIII featured seven officials, a replay official, a replay assistant, and eight alternate officials. The numbers in parentheses below indicate their uniform numbers.

- Game officials:
  - Referee: Bill Vinovich (52)
  - Umpire: Terry Killens (77)
  - Down judge: Patrick Holt (106)
  - Line judge: Mark Perlman (9)
  - Field judge: Tom Hill (97)
  - Side judge: Allen Baynes (56)
  - Back judge: Brad Freeman (88)
  - Replay official: Mike Chase
  - Replay assistant: Jack Persampire
- Alternate officials:
  - Referee: Shawn Smith (14)
  - Umpire: Barry Anderson (20)
  - Down judge: Dana McKenzie (8)
  - Line judge: Tim Podraza (47)
  - Field judge: Nate Jones (33)
  - Side judge: Anthony Jeffries (36)
  - Back judge: Greg Wilson (119)
  - Replay official: Tyler Cerimeli

Super Bowl LVIII was the third time Vinovich refereed a Super Bowl, while Perlman and Hill officiated their final games after careers spanning 23 and 25 years, respectively. Killens, a former NFL linebacker, became the first person to officiate a Super Bowl after having played in one (he played for the Tennessee Titans in Super Bowl XXXIV).

== Aftermath ==
This marked the Chiefs' third Super Bowl title and fourth Super Bowl appearance in five seasons, leading many sports commentators to consider them to be a dynasty.

After the game, the 49ers fired defensive coordinator Steve Wilks after one season on the job, citing poor defensive performances through the playoffs including the Super Bowl.

During the 2024 season, the Chiefs raced to a 9–0 start for the first time since the 2013 season. They finished with a league-best 15–2 record, becoming the first 15-win team since the 2015 Carolina Panthers, and reached their third straight Super Bowl. However, their bid to become the first team to win three consecutive Super Bowls ended with a 40–22 loss to the NFC champion Philadelphia Eagles.

The 49ers started the 2024 season at 5–4, but a collapse during the second half of the season led to a 6–11 record and missing the playoffs for the first time since the 2020 season, and the worst record for a team coming off a Super Bowl loss since the 2003 Oakland Raiders.

=== Victory parade ===
A 2-mile (3.2 km) victory parade ran from Sixth Street to Union Station on February 14. The city council authorized almost $1 million in spending for the parade.

A shooting took place at Union Station shortly after the parade. Lisa Lopez-Galvan, a DJ of local radio station KKFI, was killed and at least 22 others were non-fatally injured, including 11 children. Three suspects were arrested, with two of the suspects being armed.
