= Shawn Smith (American football) =

American football official

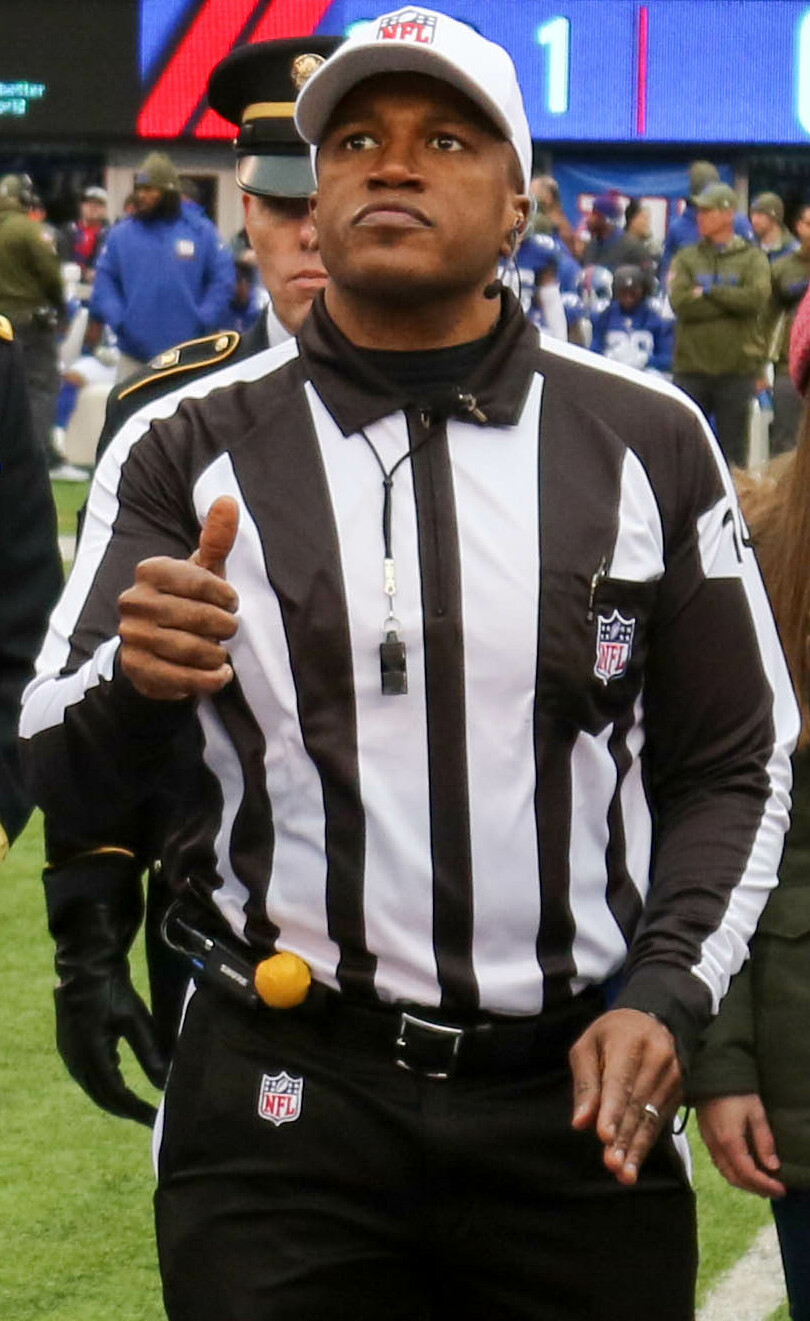
- Smith with a coin flip (Tampa Bay Buccaneers at New York Giants, 2018)
- Born: 1971 or 1972 (age 54–55)
- Occupations: NFL official (2015–), auditor

Shawn Smith (born 1971 or 1972) is an American professional football official in the National Football League (NFL). He wears uniform number 14. He entered the league in the 2015 season as an umpire, and was promoted to referee for the 2018 season, following the retirements of Terry McAulay and Gene Steratore. Smith became only the sixth African American referee in NFL history, following Johnny Grier, Mike Carey, Jerome Boger, Don Carey, and Ronald Torbert.

Outside of his NFL duties, Smith works as an internal auditor in Southfield, Michigan. Smith was the referee for Super Bowl LX on February 8, 2026, marking the second straight year an Oakland County, Michigan resident has refereed a Super Bowl, after Torbert, of nearby Pontiac, refereed Super Bowl LIX.

== Officiating crew ==
Smith's officiating crew for the 2025 NFL season was as follows:

- R: Shawn Smith
- U: Tra Blake
- DJ: Jay Bilbo
- LJ: Jeff Seeman
- FJ: Dyrol Prioleau
- SJ: Boris Cheek
- BJ: Dino Paganelli
- RO: Mike Wimmer
- RA: Larry Hill Jr.
