= Don Carey (American football official) =

American football official (born 1947)

- Born: October 10, 1947 (age 78); San Diego, California, U.S.
- Occupation: NFL official (1995–2013)

Don Carey (born October 10, 1947) is a former American football official in the National Football League (NFL), who wore uniform number 126 (now worn by Brad Rogers). He entered the NFL's officiating staff in 1995 as a field judge until 1998, where he became a back judge due to the NFL swapping position titles that season; he held that position until 2008–09. He was promoted to referee in 2009 upon the retirement of Bill Carollo, the fourth African American to do so, after Johnny Grier, younger brother Mike Carey and Jerome Boger. He officiated one Super Bowl game, which was Super Bowl XXXVII at Qualcomm Stadium in San Diego.

Don Carey's 2009 NFL officiating crew consisted of umpire Garth DeFelice, head linesman Dana McKenzie, line judge Carl Johnson, field judge Mike Weir, side judge Greg Meyer, and back judge Terrence Miles.

With the promotion of Clete Blakeman to referee in 2010, Don Carey returned to his back judge position and has worked on the officiating crew led by Ed Hochuli from 2010 to 2013. He announced that he will not return to the field for the 2014 NFL season.

Outside his NFL officiating duties, Don Carey is a contract manager.
