= Garth DeFelice =

American football official

- Occupation: National Football League (NFL) referee
- Years active: 1998–2013
- Employer: National Football League
- Known for: NFL Officiating, Super Bowl XL

Garth DeFelice is a former National Football League (NFL) referee who served from the 1998 NFL season until 2013. His uniform number was 53 (now worn by Sarah Thomas, the league's first-ever female official, and previously worn by Bill Reynolds and Frank Kirkland), and served in crews headed by Clete Blakeman from 2010–2013. He has also worked under Mike Carey and Bill Leavy, under whom he officiated Super Bowl XL. On May 4, 2014, it was announced that DeFelice would not return to the field for the 2014 season as he will become one of the regional supervisors for the officiating office.

== Controversy ==
In 2010, DeFelice was involved in a controversy in a game between the San Francisco 49ers and the San Diego Chargers. After a play, 49ers defensive lineman Justin Smith and Chargers tight end Kris Wilson were fighting. When DeFelice went in an attempt to break it up, Smith pushed DeFelice out of the way and was ejected per NFL rules regarding contact with an official.
