= Mike Carey (American football) =

American football player and official (born 1949)

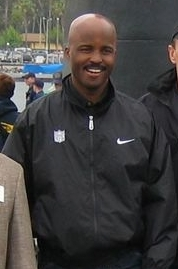
- Born: August 17, 1949 (age 77); San Diego, California, U.S.
- Education: Santa Clara University (Bachelor's degree, 1971)
- Occupations: NFL official (1990–2013); Co-owner, Seirus Innovation
- Spouse: Wendy
- Children: Danica and Drisana

Michael Carey (born August 17, 1949) is a former American football official in the National Football League (NFL). His uniform number was 94. Prior to his officiating career, he played college football as a running back for Santa Clara University.

Carey was a respected official in the NFL for his thorough pre-game preparation, professional demeanor, and fair play. In a poll conducted by ESPN in 2008, Carey tied with referee Ed Hochuli for most "best referee" votes among NFL head coaches. He had also ejected the most players in the league among current referees, as of 2002, including incidents involving Sean Taylor and Terrell Suggs. In his nineteenth year as referee with the 2013 NFL season, Carey's officiating crew consisted of umpire Chad Brown, head linesman Mark Baltz, line judge Tim Podraza, field judge Mike Weir, side judge Doug Rosenbaum and back judge Kirk Dornan.

Carey was designated as referee of Super Bowl XLII between the New England Patriots and New York Giants, becoming the first African American referee to receive the prestigious assignment. Carey officiated the same two teams when they played each other during the final week of the 2007 NFL season.

At the time of his retirement, Carey was one of the two senior referees in the NFL, along with Walt Coleman. Carey was promoted in 1995 when the league added the Carolina Panthers and Jacksonville Jaguars and thus needed an extra officiating crew to handle up to 15 games per weekend instead of 14, which had been the case between 1976 and 1994.

== Personal ==
=== Early years ===
Carey attended and later graduated from Santa Clara University in 1971 with a bachelor's degree in biology. While at SCU, he played running back for four years until an ankle injury ended his playing career. The injury continues to impact Carey today as it limits his running ability. He only allows himself to run on days he is scheduled to officiate games.

=== Family ===
Carey currently resides in San Diego, California, along with his wife, Wendy. Wendy, also a graduate of SCU, is the chief financial officer of Seirus Innovation. The couple have two daughters, Drisana and Danica. Mike Carey's older brother, Don Carey, is also a retired NFL official. He worked as a back judge from the 2010 NFL season until 2013; before that, he was a field judge from 1995 to 1997, a back judge from 1998 to 2008 and a referee in 2009.

=== Entrepreneur and inventor ===
Mike and Wendy Carey founded Seirus Innovation, a privately held company that manufactures ski and snowboarding gloves, face protection, and other cold-weather accessories, in 1979. In September 2007, Mike Carey was named Chairman of the Board for SnowSports Industries America (SIA). As chair, his goal is to "get the suppliers, retailers, reps, media and resorts to come together as one community and work together, then we can create synergy to help strengthen the snow sports industry as a whole."

Carey is an inventor who owns or shares eight ski apparel patents, including "Cat Tracks," a device which he created at age 30 to slip over the sole of a ski boot to provide increased traction when walking.

== Officiating career ==
=== Early years ===
Carey began officiating football in 1972 working Pop Warner football games in the San Diego, California, area after a suggestion by a friend. Progressing to the college level in 1985, he joined the Western Athletic Conference (WAC). In the WAC, he officiated three bowl games.

=== National Football League ===
Carey was hired by the NFL in 1990 as a side judge, before being promoted to referee for the start of the 1995 NFL season. He became the second African American referee in NFL history after Johnny Grier in 1988. In addition to being selected as referee in Super Bowl XLII, he served as an alternate for Super Bowl XXXVI. In addition to the Super Bowl, he has officiated two conference championship games, four divisional playoffs, and eight wild card games throughout his career as of the conclusion of the 2007-08 NFL playoffs.

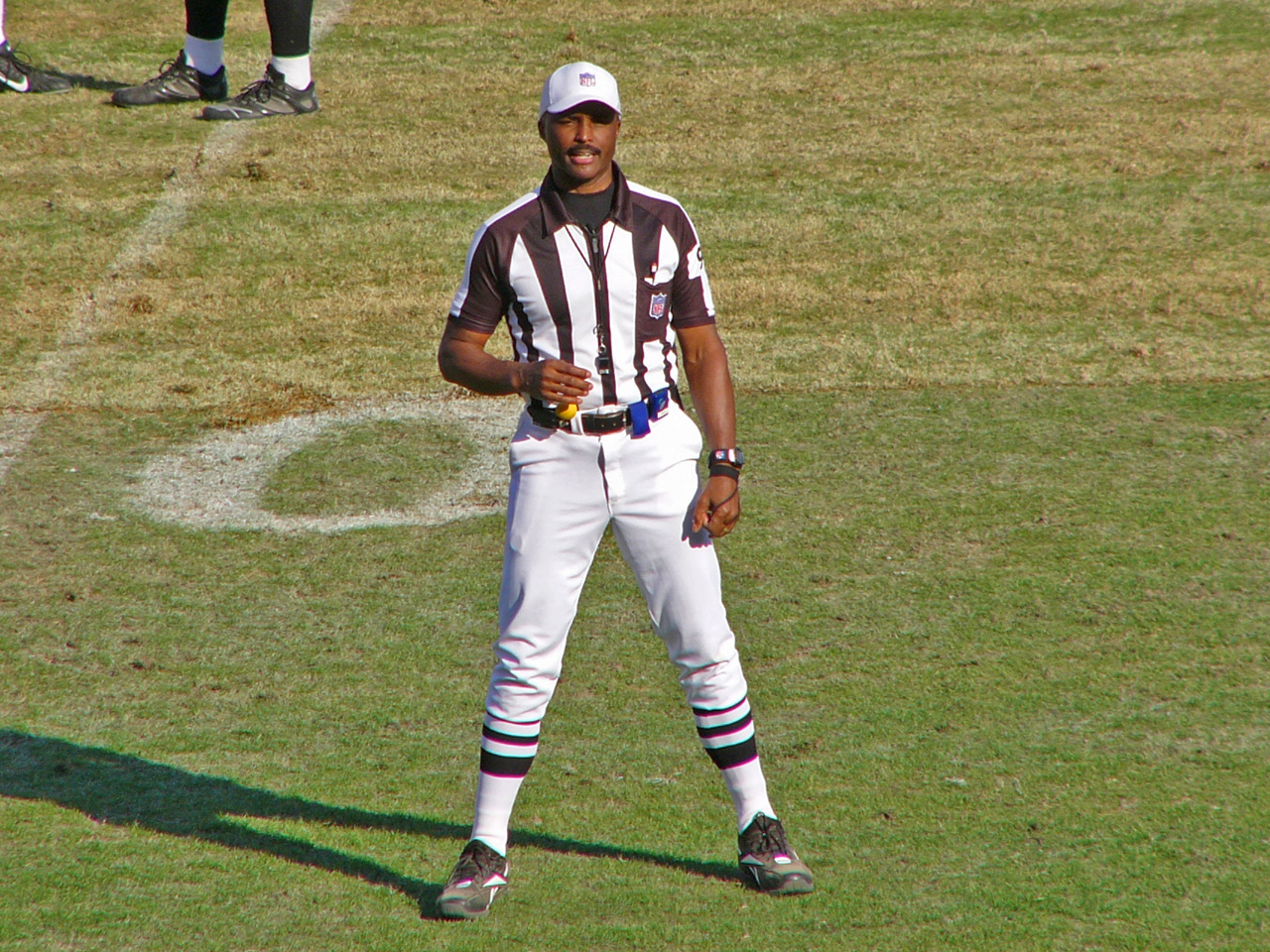
NFL referee Mike Carey December 16, 2006

Carey has worked memorable games throughout his career, most notably during the 2005 NFL season. On October 3, 2005, Mike and Don Carey became the first brothers to officiate an NFL game together when they were assigned on the same officiating crew for the game between the Carolina Panthers and Green Bay Packers.

The following week of the 2005 regular season on October 9, 2005, Carey was involved in a game between the Baltimore Ravens and Detroit Lions, which featured a pair of ejections and 21 penalties for the Ravens. In the third quarter with Detroit possession from Baltimore's 6 yard line, Terrell Suggs was penalized for roughing Detroit quarterback Joey Harrington following an incomplete pass. Suggs then quickly approached Mike Carey to argue the call and was immediately ejected from the game. After the game, Carey spoke to reporters and said, "He bumped me with malice in his heart and he was gone. He said a number of things to me."

Two months later at the start of overtime during a game between the Detroit Lions and Green Bay Packers in December 2005, Carey was unable to locate a coin to use for the coin toss. He had given his coin to a child, who served as the Packers' honorary captain, at the game's opening kickoff. The field judge was able to supply Carey with a penny.

Carey was the referee during a 2005-06 playoff game between the Tampa Bay Buccaneers and Washington Redskins. At the conclusion of a play during this game, Redskins safety Sean Taylor spat in the face of Buccaneers running back Michael Pittman. Pittman retaliated with a slap to Taylor's helmet. Carey could be heard through a live microphone immediately ejecting Taylor from the game. Head linesman Steve Stelljes conferred with Carey over Pittman's actions, but Carey decided not to penalize Pittman for his retaliation. When questioned about taking no action against Pittman by Redskins players, Carey said in response to being spat upon, "What would you do?" Mike Pereira, the vice president of officiating, approved of Carey's handling of the incident saying that "offsetting personal fouls would not have been appropriate". Pereira added, "If anybody didn't eject somebody for spitting in somebody's face, I'd be disappointed."

In an interview in August 2014, it was revealed that Carey had requested that the NFL not assign him to games featuring the Washington Redskins. A search of game logs revealed Carey had not worked a preseason or regular season game involving the Redskins since the opening week of the 2006 season.

==== Super Bowl XLII ====
Nearly two years later, Carey was named referee of Super Bowl XLII. On working the NFL's championship game, Carey said it was a "personal honor" and understood the historical significance of being the first African American referee. On the significance of the event, he said it was a "great sign of the evolution of our society that all barriers are eroding". During the fourth quarter, Carey's judgment was a factor in one of the important plays of the game. On third down, with just over a minute left in regulation, New York Giants quarterback Eli Manning received the snap in a shotgun formation and looked to pass the ball. New England Patriots defenders Richard Seymour, Jarvis Green, and Adalius Thomas grabbed and attempted to tackle Manning. Manning escaped the two defenders and threw a 32-yard pass to wide receiver David Tyree. Under NFL rules, officials are required to stop play when a player is "in the grasp and control" of the defense. Carey determined that "grasp and control" was never achieved since Manning's forward momentum did not stop. Speaking about the play, Carey said, "I anticipated a sack. I didn't assume that was going to happen, but rarely do you see a quarterback escape when he's got that much weight on his back and being dragged by two or three guys who had a hold of him. I could see [Manning's] head was just straight ahead. He was trying to break free with desperation. Then all of a sudden he spun out and then he started to come right back at me."

== Other work ==
On June 24, 2014, Carey resigned from the NFL and joined CBS Sports as a rules analyst for its Thursday night and Sunday broadcasts. He provided analysis, interpretation, and explanations from the game site, as well as the NFL Network's studios in Culver City, California, on Thursdays and from The NFL Today set in New York on Sunday. Carey's contract was not renewed after the 2015 season, after several on-air mistakes regarding calls.

Carey was replaced as referee by first-year NFL official Brad Allen.
