= Mike Weir (American football official) =

American football official

- Occupation: NFL official (2002–2013)

Mike Weir is a former American football official who officiated in the National Football League (NFL) from the 2002 NFL season through the 2013 NFL season. His uniform number was 50. He was the field judge on Mike Carey's officiating crew for the 2013 NFL season. He resides in Columbia, Missouri. On May 22, 2014, Footballzebras.com announced that Weir won't return to the field for the 2014 NFL season.
