= Tim Podraza =

American football official

- Occupation: NFL official (2008–present)

Tim Podraza is an American football official in the National Football League (NFL) since the 2008 NFL season, wearing number 47. He was the line judge on Ed Hochuli's officiating crew for the 2009 NFL season and is the line judge on Pete Morelli's officiating crew for the 2017 NFL season.
