= Johnny Grier =

American football official (1947–2022)

- Born: April 16, 1947; Charlotte, North Carolina, U.S.
- Died: March 8, 2022 (aged 74); Pasadena, Maryland, U.S.
- Education: University of the District of Columbia (BBA, MA)
- Occupation: NFL official (1981–2004)
- Children: Lowell Grier

Johnny Grier (April 16, 1947 – March 8, 2022) was an American football official for 23 years in the National Football League (NFL) from 1981 to 2004. He began in the NFL as a field judge before becoming the first Black referee in the history of the NFL with the start of the 1988 NFL season. Grier officiated in one Super Bowl, Super Bowl XXII in 1988, which was his last game as a field judge and the same game in which Doug Williams became the first Black quarterback to win the Super Bowl. On the field, he wore uniform number 23, which was also worn by Jerome Boger, another Black referee.

Grier attended college at the University of the District of Columbia, where obtained his bachelor's and master's degrees.

Grier began officiating basketball and football at age 18 and started as a Dunbar High School official in 1965, later moved on to college basketball (IAABO) and football in 1972, and eventually the NFL in 1981. In 1989, a year after becoming a referee, he oversaw the head coaching debut of Art Shell, the first black NFL head coach in the NFL's modern era.

Grier served as an officiating supervisor for the NFL and previously as Supervisor of Football Officials for the Mid-Eastern Athletic Conference (MEAC). His career ended abruptly during the 2004 NFL season when he was forced to retire due to a leg injury suffered during a series of games. He was replaced by the back judge on his crew, Scott Green, who had previous experience as a referee in NFL Europe. He later served as an officiating supervisor for the NFL and previously as Supervisor of Football Officials for the Mid-Eastern Athletic Conference (MEAC). After leaving the NFL as a Supervisor of Football Officials, he was hired as a PAC 12 Supervisor, where he later retired.

Grier died in Pasadena, Maryland, on March 8, 2022, at the age of 74.
