= 2021 Kansas City Chiefs season =

62nd season in franchise history

- Owner: The Hunt family (Clark Hunt Chairman and CEO)
- General manager: Brett Veach
- Head coach: Andy Reid
- Offensive coordinator: Eric Bieniemy
- Defensive coordinator: Steve Spagnuolo
- Home stadium: Arrowhead Stadium

Results
- Record: 12–5
- Division place: 1st AFC West
- Playoffs: Won Wild Card Playoffs (vs. Steelers) 42–21; Won Divisional Playoffs (vs. Bills) 42–36 (OT); Lost AFC Championship (vs. Bengals) 24–27 (OT)
- All-Pros: 2: TE Travis Kelce (2nd team); DT Chris Jones (2nd team)
- Pro Bowlers: 7: QB Patrick Mahomes; WR Tyreek Hill; TE Travis Kelce; OT Orlando Brown Jr.; DE Frank Clark; DT Chris Jones; SS Tyrann Mathieu
- Team MVP: Tyrann Mathieu
- Team ROY: Nick Bolton

Uniform
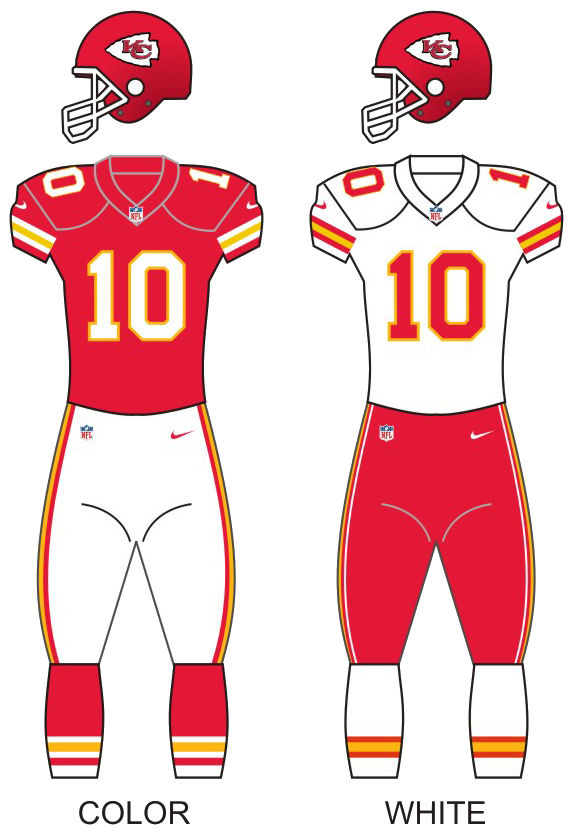

The 2021 season was the Kansas City Chiefs' 52nd season in the National Football League (NFL), their 62nd overall and their ninth under head coach Andy Reid, looking to become the fourth team in NFL history to make three straight Super Bowls.

The Chiefs started off slowly at 3–4 but would finish the regular season 12–5, winning the AFC West division title for the sixth consecutive season and 14th overall. The Chiefs would host their fourth straight conference championship but lost to the Cincinnati Bengals in overtime 27–24.

This would be the final season with long-time wide receiver Tyreek Hill, as he was traded to the Miami Dolphins on March 23, 2022. A 6-time Pro Bowler during his time with Kansas City, Hill's final game with the Chiefs was on January 30, 2022, the aforementioned AFC Championship Game vs. the Bengals.

Head coach Andy Reid recorded his 100th win as the Chiefs head coach on October 3, 2021, a 42–30 win over his former team, Philadelphia Eagles. Reid became the first coach in NFL history to win 100 games as a head coach with multiple teams as well as the first to lead multiple teams to four straight Conference Championships, previously doing so with the Eagles from the 2001 to 2004 seasons.

== Season summary ==
On March 4, 2021, the Chiefs announced that they had officially renamed Arrowhead Stadium, GEHA Field at Arrowhead Stadium.

The Chiefs lost two of their longest tenured players in the offseason. Tackle Eric Fisher was released and fullback Anthony Sherman retired. Both players joined the Chiefs in 2013.

In the offseason, the Chiefs announced they would once again retire their live horse mascot Warpaint to continue with their commitment to stop using Native American imagery.

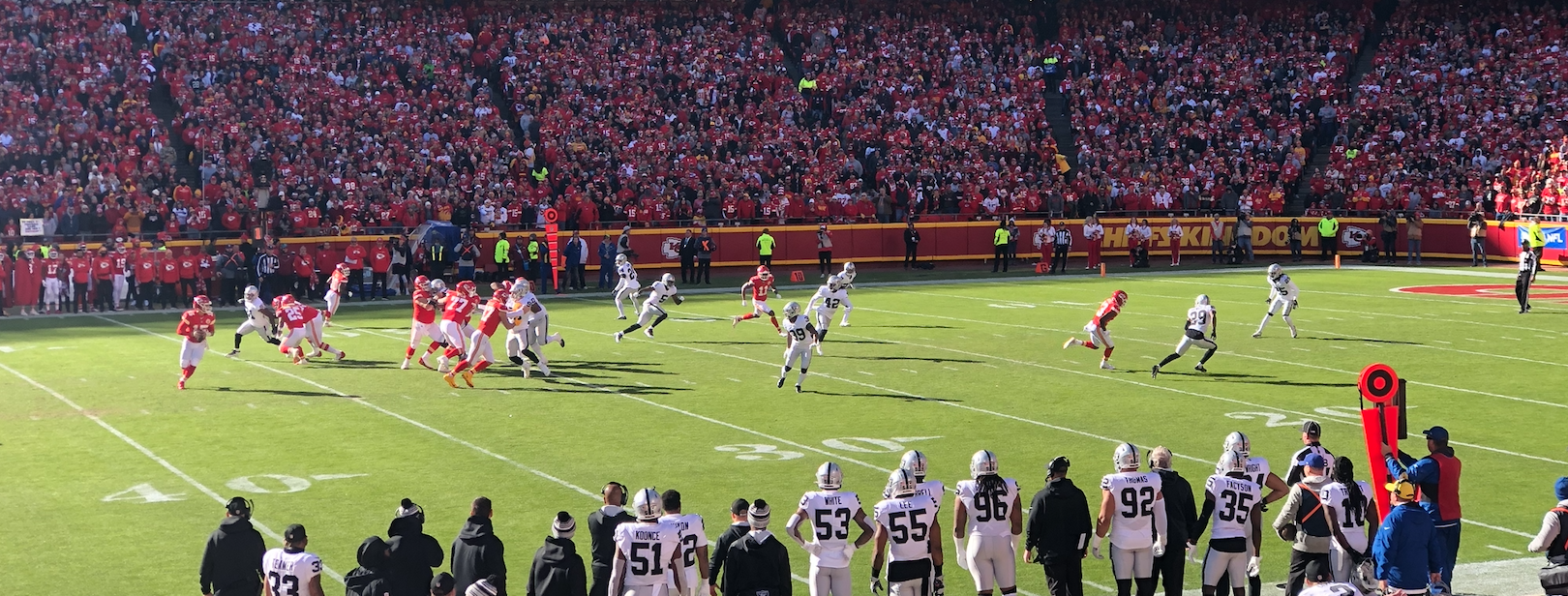
The Chiefs hosting the Raiders on December 12, a game in which they would win 48–9. It was the franchise's largest victory over their rival.

The Chiefs opened the season on September 12 with a 33–29 victory over the Cleveland Browns. The win was the Chiefs' 15th consecutive win in September. The Chiefs would lose their next two games to give them a 1–2 record after three games, which was their first losing record in 89 games, dating back to week 10 of the 2015 season. The Chiefs' 20–38 week 5 loss to the Buffalo Bills, was the Chiefs' first double-digit loss in the regular season since 2017 and the Chiefs' first double-digit loss at home since 2014. In Week 7, the Chiefs lost 3–27 to the Tennessee Titans, which is the fewest points scored in a game since Patrick Mahomes became the quarterback. The Chiefs maintained a non-winning record until a week 9 victory over the Green Bay Packers. That 7-week stretch without a winning record was the Chiefs' longest stretch without a winning record since 2012 when they held a losing record the entire season. After starting the season 3–4, the Chiefs won their ninth game in week 14 over the Las Vegas Raiders clinching their ninth consecutive winning season, one short of the franchise record of 10. The 48–9 victory over the Raiders was the largest in franchise history over the Raiders and the largest victory against any opponent since the 2006 season. In week 16, following a 36–10 victory over the Steelers and a loss by the Chargers, the Chiefs clinched their sixth consecutive AFC West division championship and their franchise record seventh straight playoff berth. The Chiefs finished the regular season 12–5, their fourth consecutive 12-win season, all four since Patrick Mahomes became the starting quarterback.

Kansas City defeated the Pittsburgh Steelers 42–21 in the Wild Card round of the 2021–22 NFL playoffs. They would then host Buffalo in the Divisional round, winning that game 42–36 in overtime. This game was hailed as one of the greatest modern NFL playoff games, with both teams combining for 25 points in the final two minutes of regulation. The following week, despite being favored to win the AFC Championship game, the Chiefs would lose the game in an upset to the Bengals in overtime 24–27, a game in which they led 21–3 at one point in the second quarter.

== NFL Top 100 ==
NFL Network began announcing their annual top 100 list on August 15, 2021. Five Chiefs players were named to the list. Defensive end Frank Clark is the only player still on the roster that was ranked the previous season that went unranked for the 2021 season. Tight end Travis Kelce was ranked 5th, which is the highest ranking ever for a tight end in the history of the Top 100. Quarterback Patrick Mahomes was ranked 1st on the list, which was the first time a Chiefs player was ranked the number one.

Rank	Player	Position	Change
1	Patrick Mahomes	Quarterback	▲3
5	Travis Kelce	Tight end	▲13
15	Tyreek Hill	Wide receiver	▲7
34	Chris Jones	Defensive tackle	▲2
58	Tyrann Mathieu	Safety	▼19

== Offseason ==
Transactions listed below occurred between the day after Super Bowl LV, February 8, and August 14, the day of the Chiefs first preseason game.

Source unless otherwise noted

=== Coaching staff changes ===
2021 Kansas City Chiefs Coaching staff changes
Old coach	Reason	Position	New coach
Deland McCullough	Accepted job at Indiana	Running backs coach	Greg Lewis
Britt Reid	Contract expired, not re-signed for disciplinary reasons	Linebackers/outside linebackers coach	Ken Flajole
Greg Lewis	Title change to Running backs coach	Wide receivers	Joe Bleymaier
Joe Bleymaier	Title change to Wide receivers coach	Pass game analyst / assistant quarterbacks	David Girardi
David Girardi	Title change to Pass game analyst / Assistant quarterbacks	Offensive quality control	Connor Embree
Connor Embree	Title change to Offensive quality control	Defensive assistant	Donald D'Alesio

=== Players lost ===
Below are players who were on the roster at the end of the 2020 season, but were either released or did not re-sign after their contract expired. If a player resigns during the offseason, their name will be removed from the list.

2021 Kansas City Chiefs Players lost
Player	Position	Reason
Le'Veon Bell	RB	UFA
Bashaud Breeland	CB	UFA
Alex Brown	CB	ERFA
Eric Fisher	T	Released
Antonio Hamilton	CB	UFA
Tanoh Kpassagnon	DE	UFA
Kelechi Osemele	G	UFA
Mike Pennel	DT	UFA
Martinas Rankin	T	Released
Austin Reiter	C	UFA
Mitchell Schwartz	T	Released
Sammy Watkins	WR	UFA
Damien Williams	RB	Released
Damien Wilson	LB	UFA
Deon Yelder	TE	RFA

=== Retirements ===
Players that were on the Chiefs roster at the end of the season who announced their retirement before the preseason are listed below, even if their contract with the Chiefs had officially expired prior to their announcement.

2021 Kansas City Chiefs Retirements
Player	Position	NFL seasons	Seasons with the Chiefs
Anthony Sherman	FB	10	8
Nick Keizer	TE	4	2
Daniel Kilgore	C	10	1

=== Players added ===
2021 Kansas City Chiefs Additions
Player	Position
Kyle Long	G
Joe Thuney	G
Blake Bell	TE
Anthony Gordon	QB
Jordan Ta'amu	QB
Gehrig Dieter*	WR
Dalton Schoen	WR
Chad Williams	WR
Antonio Callaway	WR
Jody Fortson*	TE
Maurice Ffrench*	WR
Derrick Gore	RB
Sean Culkin	TE
Evan Baylis*	TE
Prince Tega Wanogho	T
Bryan Witzmann*	T
Darryl Williams*	G
Tyler Clark	DT
Demone Harris*	DE
Austin Edwards*	DE
Omari Cobb*	LB
Emmanuel Smith*	LB
Deandre Baker*	CB
Rodney Clemons	S
Jarran Reed	DT
Elijah McGuire	RB
Michael Burton	FB
Austin Blythe	C
Tajae Sharpe	WR
Kamalei Correa	LB
Daurice Fountain	WR
Darrius Shepherd	WR

*Finished 2020 season on the Chiefs practice squad.

=== Trades ===
Listed below are trades were a player was included in the trade.

2021 Kansas City Chiefs Trades
Team	Received	Compensation
Baltimore Ravens	T Orlando Brown Jr. 2nd-round selection 2021; 6th-round selection 2022	1st-round selection 2021; 3rd-round selection 2021; 4th-round selection 2021; 5th-round selection 2022
Minnesota Vikings	CB Mike Hughes; 7th-round selection 2022	6th-round selection 2022

=== Draft ===
2021 Kansas City Chiefs Draft
Round	Selection	Player	Position	College
2	58	Nick Bolton	Linebacker	Missouri
2	63	Creed Humphrey	Center	Oklahoma
4	144*	Joshua Kaindoh	Defensive end	Florida State
5	162	Noah Gray	Tight end	Duke
5	181*	Cornell Powell	Wide receiver	Clemson
6	226	Trey Smith	Guard	Tennessee

*	Compensatory selection

Trades

- The Chiefs traded a sixth-round selection (213th overall) in the 2021 draft to the Tennessee Titans in exchange for a seventh-round selection in the 2020 NFL draft.
- The Chiefs received a sixth-round selection (207th overall) in the 2021 draft from the Miami Dolphins in exchange for a seventh-round selection (258th overall) in the 2021 draft and running back DeAndre Washington.
- The Chiefs traded their first-round selection (31st overall), third-round selection (94th overall), fourth-round selection (136th overall) in the 2021 draft, and a fifth-round selection in the 2022 NFL draft to the Baltimore Ravens in exchange for offensive tackle Orlando Brown Jr., a second-round selection (58th overall) in the 2021 draft, and a sixth-round selection in the 2022 NFL draft.
- The Chiefs traded their fourth-round selection (175th overall) and their sixth-round selection (207th overall) to the New York Jets in exchange for the Jets fourth-round selection (162nd overall) and a sixth-round selection (226th overall).

=== Undrafted free agents ===
2021 Kansas City Chiefs UDFAs
Player	Position	College
Zayne Anderson	S	BYU
Dicaprio Bootle	CB	Nebraska
Shane Buechele	QB	SMU
Marlon Character	CB	Louisville
Riley Cole	LB	South Alabama
Malik Herring	DE	Georgia
Devon Key	S	Western Kentucky
Jaylon McClain-Sapp	CB	Marshall
Manny Patterson	CB	Maine

=== Signed and released in the offseason ===
Below are players who were signed and released in the offseason before playing for the team.

2021 Kansas City Chiefs Signed and released
Player	Position
Sean Culkin	TE
Jordan Ta'amu	QB
Tajae Sharpe	WR
Jaylon McClain-Sapp	CB
Kamalei Correa	LB
Drew Scott	LS

== Preseason transactions ==
Transactions listed below, occurred between August 15, the day after the Chiefs first preseason game, and September 12, the day of the Chiefs first regular season game.

Source for all transactions

=== Cut to 85 ===
The first preseason roster cutdown occurred on August 17. In addition the transactions below, the Chiefs placed running back Elijah McGuire on injured reserve.

2021 Kansas City Chiefs Cut to 85
Name	Position
Evan Baylis	TE
Antonio Callaway	WR
Manny Patterson	CB
Chad Williams	WR

=== Cut to 80 ===
The second preseason cutdown occurred on August 24. The Chiefs released or waived five players and did not use reserve lists to make the 80 player limit.

2021 Kansas City Chiefs Cut to 80
Name	Position
Taco Charlton	DE
Will Parks	CB
Bryan Witzmann	G
Riley Cole	LB
Anthony Gordon	QB

=== Final cutdown ===
The third and final preseason cutdown occurred on August 31. In addition to the transactions below, the Chiefs traded a player, placed Kyle Long on the physically unable to perform list, and placed Malik Herring on the reserve/non-football injury list.

2021 Kansas City Chiefs Final Cutdown
Name	Position
Zayne Anderson	S
Dicaprio Bootle	CB
Shane Buechele	QB
Marlon Character	CB
Tyler Clark	DT
Rodney Clemons	S
Omari Cobb	LB
Austin Edwards	DE
Maurice Ffrench	WR
Derrick Gore	RB
Demone Harris	DE
Marcus Kemp	WR
Devon Key	S
BoPete Keyes	CB
Wyatt Miller	OT
Cornell Powell	WR
Dalton Schoen	WR
Darrius Shepherd	WR
Emmanuel Smith	LB
Darwin Thompson	RB
Prince Tega Wanogho	OT
Tim Ward	DE
Darryl Williams	C

=== Trades ===
Listed below are trades were a player was included in the trade.

2021 Kansas City Chiefs Trades
Team	Received	Compensation
New England Patriots	7th round selection 2022 NFL draft	Yasir Durant

=== Signings ===
2021 Kansas City Chiefs Signings
Name	Position
Marcus Kemp*	WR

*Marcus Kemp was initially released during roster cut-downs, but was signed to the practice squad. The day after being signed to the practice squad, he was elevated to the active roster after linebacker Willie Gay was placed on injured reserve

== Regular season transactions ==
Below are transactions that occurred after the Chiefs first game through their final game. Transactions below are only transactions related to the Chiefs active roster. Practice squad transactions will not be included.

Source for transactions through December 31

Source for transactions after January 1

=== Standard elevations ===
Standard practice squad elevations allow a player to elevated from the practice squad to the active roster for a single game and revert to the practice squad following the game. Below are standard elevations used by the Chiefs during the season.

2021 Kansas City Chiefs Standard elevations
Name	Position	Week(s) used
Zayne Anderson	S	1
Dicaprio Bootle	CB	4, 14
Demone Harris*	DE	5, 6
Darius Harris	LB	7, 8
Christian Rozeboom*	LB	7
Austin Edwards	DE	8
Daurice Fountain	WR	11, WC, DV, ACG
Josh Jackson	CB	14, 16
Nakia Griffin-Stewart	TE	16
Johnny Townsend*	P	16
Darwin Thompson	RB	WC, DV

*No longer on practice squad

=== Non-standard elevations ===
Below are players elevated from the practice squad using a non-standard elevation, meaning, if the Chiefs want them to go back to the practice squad, they must clear waivers then sign them back to the practice squad.

2021 Kansas City Chiefs Non-Standard elevations
Name	Position
Josh Gordon	WR
Derrick Gore	RB
Prince Tega Wanogho	OT
Shane Buechele	QB
Zayne Anderson	S
Elliott Fry	K

=== Trades ===
Listed below are trades where a player was included in the trade.

2021 Kansas City Chiefs Trades
Team	Received	Compensation
Pittsburgh Steelers	DE Melvin Ingram	6th-round selection 2022 NFL draft
New York Jets	TE Daniel Brown	G Laurent Duvernay-Tardif

=== Players cut ===
2021 Kansas City Chiefs Cuts
Name	Position
Darius Harris	LB
Daurice Fountain	WR
Daniel Brown	TE
Elliott Fry	K
Josh Gordon	WR

=== Injured reserve activations ===
Players listed below were activated off injured reserve

2021 Kansas City Chiefs IR Activations
Name	Position	Date added to IR	Date activated
Willie Gay	LB	September 2	October 9
Clyde Edwards-Helaire	RB	October 12	November 20
Jerick McKinnon	RB	November 30	January 1
Joshua Kaindoh	DE	October 5	January 11
Khalen Saunders	DT	November 30	January 25

=== COVID-19 protocols ===
The following players missed games because of the NFL's COVID-19 protocols. Typically, a player misses because of a positive test. Vaccinated players can return simply after a subsequent negative test, unvaccinated players are out for five days.

2021 Kansas City Chiefs COVID-19
Name	Position	Week(s) missed
Chris Jones	DT	15
Josh Gordon	WR	15
Willie Gay	LB	15
Harrison Butker	K	16
Rashad Fenton	CB	16
Kyle Long	G	16
Tommy Townsend	P	16
Nick Bolton	LB	16
Travis Kelce	TE	16
Lucas Niang	OT	16

== Staff ==
2021 Kansas City Chiefs staff
Front office: Chairman/CEO – Clark Hunt; President – Mark Donovan; General manager – Brett Veach; Assistant general manager – Mike Borgonzi; Vice president of football operations – Brandt Tilis; Vice president of football operations/Team counsel – Chris Shea; Director of player personnel – Mike Bradway; Director of pro personnel – Tim Terry; Director of college scouting – Ryne Nutt; Assistant director of college scouting – Trey Koziol; Senior personnel executive – Willie Davis; College scouting coordinator – Greg Castillo; Head coaches: Head coach – Andy Reid; Assistant head coach/special teams coordinator – Dave Toub; Offensive coaches: Offensive coordinator – Eric Bieniemy; Quarterbacks/passing game coordinator – Mike Kafka; Running backs – Greg Lewis; Wide receivers – Joe Bleymaier; Tight ends – Tom Melvin; Offensive line – Andy Heck; Assistant offensive line – Corey Matthaei; Pass game analyst/assistant quarterbacks – David Girardi; Offensive quality control – Connor Embree; Offensive quality control – Porter Ellett	Defensive coaches: Defensive coordinator – Steve Spagnuolo; Run game coordinator/defensive line – Brendan Daly; Assistant defensive line – Terry Bradden; Linebackers – Matt House; Outside linebackers – Ken Flajole; Defensive backs – Dave Merritt; Defensive backs/cornerbacks – Sam Madison; Defensive assistant – Donald D'Alesio; Defensive quality control – Alex Whittingham; Special teams coaches: Assistant special teams – Andy Hill; Strength and conditioning: Strength and conditioning – Barry Rubin; Assistant strength and conditioning – Greg Carbin; Assistant strength and conditioning – Tyler Judkins; Assistant strength and conditioning/director of sports science – Ryan Reynolds

== Final roster ==
2021 Kansas City Chiefs roster
Quarterbacks (QB): 6 Shane Buechele; 4 Chad Henne; 15 Patrick Mahomes; Running backs (RB): 45 Michael Burton; 25 Clyde Edwards-Helaire; 40 Derrick Gore; 1 Jerick McKinnon; 31 Darrel Williams; Wide receivers (WR): 17 Mecole Hardman; 10 Tyreek Hill; 85 Marcus Kemp; 13 Byron Pringle; 11 Demarcus Robinson; Tight ends (TE): 81 Blake Bell; 83 Noah Gray; 87 Travis Kelce	Offensive linemen (OL): 73 Nick Allegretti G; 66 Austin Blythe C; 57 Orlando Brown T; 52 Creed Humphrey C; 69 Kyle Long G; 65 Trey Smith G; 62 Joe Thuney G; 70 Prince Tega Wanogho T; 77 Andrew Wylie T; Defensive linemen (DL): 55 Frank Clark DE; 51 Mike Danna DE; 24 Melvin Ingram DE; 95 Chris Jones DE/DT; 59 Joshua Kaindoh DE; 91 Derrick Nnadi DT; 97 Alex Okafor DE; 90 Jarran Reed DT; 99 Khalen Saunders DT; 98 Tershawn Wharton DT	Linebackers (LB): 54 Nick Bolton OLB; 50 Willie Gay OLB/MLB; 53 Anthony Hitchens MLB; 56 Ben Niemann OLB; 44 Dorian O'Daniel OLB; Defensive backs (DB): 39 Zayne Anderson FS; 30 Deandre Baker CB; 27 Rashad Fenton CB; 21 Mike Hughes CB; 32 Tyrann Mathieu SS; 38 L'Jarius Sneed CB; 49 Daniel Sorensen FS; 22 Juan Thornhill FS/SS; 35 Charvarius Ward CB; 23 Armani Watts SS; Special teams (ST): 7 Harrison Butker K; 5 Tommy Townsend P; 41 James Winchester LS	Practice squad: -- Andrew Billings DT; 2 Dicaprio Bootle CB; 79 Cortez Broughton DT; 84 Matt Bushman TE; 12 Gehrig Dieter WR; 60 Austin Edwards DE; 82 Daurice Fountain WR; 19 Josh Gordon WR; 47 Darius Harris OLB; -- Joe Jackson DE; -- Roderick Johnson T; -- Devon Key SS; 14 Cornell Powell WR; 34 Darwin Thompson RB; 80 Mark Vital TE; 64 Darryl Williams C; Reserve: 88 Jody Fortson TE (IR); -- Malik Herring DE (NF-Inj.); 26 Chris Lammons CB (IR/DFR); 67 Lucas Niang T (IR); 75 Mike Remmers T (IR); Rookies in italics 53 active, 5 reserve, 16 practice squad

== Preseason ==
=== Schedule ===
Week	Date	Opponent	Result	Record	Venue	Recap
1	August 14	at San Francisco 49ers	W 19–16	1–0	Levi's Stadium	Recap
2	August 20	at Arizona Cardinals	W 17–10	2–0	State Farm Stadium	Recap
3	August 27	Minnesota Vikings	W 28–25	3–0	Arrowhead Stadium	Recap

=== Game summaries ===
==== Week 1: at San Francisco 49ers ====
Week 1: Kansas City Chiefs at San Francisco 49ers – Game summary

Quarter	1	2	3	4	Total
Chiefs	7	0	3	9	19
49ers	6	3	0	7	16

at Levi's Stadium, Santa Clara, California

- Date: August 14
- Game time: 7:30 p.m. CDT/5:30 p.m. PDT
- Game weather: Clear, 79 °F (26 °C)
- Game attendance: 54,397
- Referee: Carl Cheffers
- TV announcers (KSHB): Ari Wolfe, Trent Green, Kay Adams and Matt McMullen
- Recap, Game Book

Game information

First quarter

- KC – Byron Pringle 5-yard pass from Chad Henne (Harrison Butker kick), 2:54. Chiefs 7–0. Drive: 6 plays, 39 yards, 3:31.
- SF – Trent Sherfield 80-yard pass from Trey Lance (kick failed, hit right upright), 2:36. Chiefs 7–6. Drive: 1 play, 80 yards, 0:18.

Second quarter

- SF – Robbie Gould 36-yard field goal, 12:25. 49ers 9–7. Drive: 8 plays, 27 yards, 4:28.

Third quarter

- KC – Harrison Butker 52-yard field goal, 8:46. Chiefs 10–9. Drive: 12 plays, 50 yards, 6:14.

Fourth quarter

- KC – Harrison Butker 46-yard field goal, 4:27. Chiefs 13–9. Drive: 5 plays, 31 yards, 2:40.
- SF – JaMycal Hasty 4-yard run (Robbie Gould kick), 2:37. 49ers 16–13. Drive: 4 plays, 59 yards, 1:50.
- KC – Shane Buechele 1-yard run (kick failed, hit left upright), 1:14. Chiefs 19–16. Drive: 9 plays, 68 yards, 1:23.

Top passers

- KC – Anthony Gordon – 11/17, 79 yards
- SF – Trey Lance – 5/14, 128 yards, TD

Top rushers

- KC – Jerick McKinnon – 3 rushes, 19 yards
- SF – JaMycal Hasty – 10 rushes, 63 yards, TD

Top receivers

- KC – Daurice Fountain – 4 receptions, 38 yards
- SF – Trent Sherfield – 1 reception, 80 yards, TD

==== Week 2: at Arizona Cardinals ====
Week 2: Kansas City Chiefs at Arizona Cardinals – Game summary

Quarter	1	2	3	4	Total
Chiefs	3	7	7	0	17
Cardinals	0	0	3	7	10

at State Farm Stadium, Glendale, Arizona

- Date: August 20
- Game time: 7:00 p.m. CDT/5:00 p.m. MST
- Game weather: None (retractable roof closed)
- Game attendance: 56,271
- Referee: Ronald Torbert
- TV announcers (ESPN): Steve Levy, Brian Griese, Louis Riddick and Lisa Salters
- Recap, Game Book

Game information

First quarter

- KC – Harrison Butker 24-yard field goal, 5:11. Chiefs 3–0. Drive: 15 plays, 57 yards, 8:20.

Second quarter

- KC – Mecole Hardman 17-yard pass from Chad Henne (Harrison Butker kick), 1:21. Chiefs 10–0. Drive: 6 plays, 77 yards, 0:49.

Third quarter

- KC – Jerick McKinnon 5-yard pass from Shane Buechele (Harrison Butker kick), 8:23. Chiefs 17–0. Drive: 12 plays, 87 yards, 6:37.
- ARI – Matt Prater 22-yard field goal, 1:57. Chiefs 17–3. Drive: 14 plays, 72 yards, 6:26.

Fourth quarter

- ARI – Ross Travis 20-yard pass from Chris Streveler (Matt Prater kick), 9:03. Chiefs 17–10. Drive: 12 plays, 88 yards, 5:16.

Top passers

- KC – Shane Buechele – 9/11, 115 yards, TD, INT
- ARI – Colt McCoy – 13/18, 113 yards, INT

Top rushers

- KC – Derrick Gore – 8 rushes, 54 yards
- ARI – Colt McCoy – 3 rushes, 20 yards

Top receivers

- KC – Byron Pringle – 4 receptions, 63 yards
- ARI – Greg Dortch – 3 receptions, 44 yards

==== Week 3: vs. Minnesota Vikings ====
Week 3: Minnesota Vikings at Kansas City Chiefs – Game summary

Quarter	1	2	3	4	Total
Vikings	3	0	7	15	25
Chiefs	14	7	7	0	28

at Arrowhead Stadium, Kansas City, Missouri

- Date: August 27
- Game time: 7:00 p.m. CDT
- Game weather: Sunny, 91 °F (33 °C)
- Game attendance: 72,680
- Referee: Shawn Hochuli
- TV announcers (KSHB): Ari Wolfe, Trent Green, Kay Adams and Matt McMullen
- Recap, Game Book

Game information

First quarter

- KC – Tyreek Hill 35-yard pass from Patrick Mahomes (Harrison Butker kick), 12:22. Chiefs 7–0. Drive: 5 plays, 79 yards, 2:38.
- MIN – Greg Joseph 26-yard field goal, 7:55. Chiefs 7–3. Drive: 10 plays, 67 yards, 4:27.
- KC – Blake Bell 5-yard pass from Patrick Mahomes (Harrison Butker kick), 3:06. Chiefs 14–3. Drive: 10 plays, 75 yards, 4:49.

Second quarter

- KC – Marcus Kemp 23-yard pass from Shane Buechele (Harrison Butker kick), 0:26. Chiefs 21–3. Drive: 12 plays, 88 yards, 1:37.

Third quarter

- MIN – A. J. Rose 32-yard run (Greg Joseph kick), 9:23. Chiefs 21–10. Drive: 7 plays, 69 yards, 3:34.
- KC – Derrick Gore 56-yard pass from Shane Buechele (Harrison Butker kick), 8:05. Chiefs 28–10. Drive: 3 plays, 75 yards, 1:18.

Fourth quarter

- MIN – Parry Nickerson 10-yard interception return (Kellen Mond–Myron Mitchell pass), 8:24. Chiefs 28–18.
- MIN – A. J. Rose 1-yard run (Greg Joseph kick), 1:24. Chiefs 28–25. Drive: 8 plays, 89 yards, 2:19.

Top passers

- MIN – Kellen Mond – 16/23, 196 yards, INT
- KC – Shane Buechele – 20/33, 231 yards, 2 TD, INT

Top rushers

- MIN – A. J. Rose – 6 rushes, 41 yards, 2 TD
- KC – Derrick Gore – 6 rushes, 26 yards

Top receivers

- MIN – K. J. Osborn – 3 receptions, 68 yards
- KC – Derrick Gore – 5 receptions, 80 yards, TD

== Regular season ==
=== Schedule ===
Week	Date	Opponent	Result	Record	Venue	Recap
1	September 12	Cleveland Browns	**W** 33–29	1–0	Arrowhead Stadium	Recap
2	September 19	at Baltimore Ravens	**L** 35–36	1–1	M&T Bank Stadium	Recap
3	September 26	**Los Angeles Chargers**	**L** 24–30	1–2	Arrowhead Stadium	Recap
4	October 3	at Philadelphia Eagles	**W** 42–30	2–2	Lincoln Financial Field	Recap
5	October 10	Buffalo Bills	**L** 20–38	2–3	Arrowhead Stadium	Recap
6	October 17	at Washington Football Team	**W** 31–13	3–3	FedExField	Recap
7	October 24	at Tennessee Titans	**L** 3–27	3–4	Nissan Stadium	Recap
8	November 1	New York Giants	**W** 20–17	4–4	Arrowhead Stadium	Recap
9	November 7	Green Bay Packers	**W** 13–7	5–4	Arrowhead Stadium	Recap
10	November 14	at **Las Vegas Raiders**	**W** 41–14	6–4	Allegiant Stadium	Recap
11	November 21	Dallas Cowboys	**W** 19–9	7–4	Arrowhead Stadium	Recap
12	Bye					
13	December 5	**Denver Broncos**	**W** 22–9	8–4	Arrowhead Stadium	Recap
14	December 12	**Las Vegas Raiders**	**W** 48–9	9–4	Arrowhead Stadium	Recap
15	December 16	at **Los Angeles Chargers**	**W** 34–28 (OT)	10–4	SoFi Stadium	Recap
16	December 26	Pittsburgh Steelers	**W** 36–10	11–4	Arrowhead Stadium	Recap
17	January 2	at Cincinnati Bengals	**L** 31–34	11–5	Paul Brown Stadium	Recap
18	January 8	at **Denver Broncos**	**W** 28–24	12–5	Empower Field at Mile High	Recap

Note: Intra-division opponents are in bold text.

=== Game summaries ===
==== Week 1: vs. Cleveland Browns ====
Week 1: Cleveland Browns at Kansas City Chiefs – Game summary

Quarter	1	2	3	4	Total
Browns	8	14	0	7	**29**
**Chiefs**	3	7	10	13	**33**

at Arrowhead Stadium, Kansas City, Missouri

- Date: September 12
- Game time: 3:25 p.m. CDT
- Game weather: Sunny, 88 °F (31 °C)
- Game attendance: 72,973
- Referee: Bill Vinovich
- TV announcers (CBS): Jim Nantz, Tony Romo and Tracy Wolfson
- Recap, Game Book

Game information

**First quarter**

- CLE – Nick Chubb 4-yard run (Kareem Hunt run), 7:53. Browns 8–0. **Drive: 13 plays, 75 yards, 7:07.**
- KC – Harrison Butker 28-yard field goal, 1:51. Browns 8–3. **Drive: 10 plays, 71 yards, 6:02.**

**Second quarter**

- CLE – Jarvis Landry 5-yard run (Chase McLaughlin kick), 13:28. Browns 15–3. **Drive: 6 plays, 75 yards, 3:23.**
- KC – Patrick Mahomes 5-yard run (Harrison Butker kick), 6:30. Browns 15–10. **Drive: 12 plays, 75 yards, 6:58.**
- CLE – Nick Chubb 18-yard run (Chase McLaughlin kick), 2:55. Browns 22–10. **Drive: 6 plays, 81 yards, 3:35.**

**Third quarter**

- KC – Travis Kelce 11-yard pass from Patrick Mahomes (Harrison Butker kick), 7:27. Browns 22–17. **Drive: 14 plays, 75 yards, 7:33.**
- KC – Harrison Butker 43-yard field goal, 0:32. Browns 22–20. **Drive: 10 plays, 28 yards, 5:24.**

**Fourth quarter**

- CLE – Kareem Hunt 2-yard run (Chase McLaughlin kick), 10:24. Browns 29–20. **Drive: 9 plays, 75 yards, 5:08.**
- KC – Tyreek Hill 75-yard pass from Patrick Mahomes (Harrison Butker kick), 10:10. Browns 29–27. **Drive: 1 play, 75 yards, 0:14.**
- KC – Travis Kelce 8-yard pass from Patrick Mahomes (pass failed), 7:04. Chiefs 33–29. **Drive: 3 plays, 15 yards, 1:32.**

**Top passers**

- CLE – Baker Mayfield – 21/28, 321 yards, INT
- KC – Patrick Mahomes – 27/36, 337 yards, 3 TD

**Top rushers**

- CLE – Nick Chubb – 15 rushes, 83 yards, 2 TD
- KC – Clyde Edwards-Helaire – 14 rushes, 43 yards

**Top receivers**

- CLE – David Njoku – 3 receptions, 76 yards
- KC – Tyreek Hill – 11 receptions, 197 yards, TD

==== Week 2: at Baltimore Ravens ====
Week 2: Kansas City Chiefs at Baltimore Ravens – Game summary

Quarter	1	2	3	4	Total
Chiefs	14	7	14	0	**35**
**Ravens**	7	10	7	12	**36**

at M&T Bank Stadium, Baltimore, Maryland

- Date: September 19
- Game time: 7:20 p.m. CDT/8:20 p.m. EDT
- Game weather: Clear, 73 °F (23 °C)
- Game attendance: 70,417
- Referee: Clete Blakeman
- TV announcers (NBC): Al Michaels, Cris Collinsworth and Michele Tafoya
- Recap, Game Book

Game information

**First quarter**

- KC – Tyrann Mathieu 34-yard interception return (Harrison Butker kick), 14:10. Chiefs 7–0.
- BAL – Devin Duvernay 2-yard fumble recovery (Justin Tucker kick), 10:36. Tied 7–7. **Drive: 6 plays, 75 yards, 3:34.**
- KC – Demarcus Robinson 33-yard pass from Patrick Mahomes (Harrison Butker kick), 6:05. Chiefs 14–7. **Drive: 8 plays, 92 yards, 4:31.**

**Second quarter**

- BAL – Latavius Murray 5-yard run (Justin Tucker kick), 3:21. Tied 14–14. **Drive: 9 plays, 72 yards, 5:31.**
- KC – Darrel Williams 2-yard run (Harrison Butker kick), 0:51. Chiefs 21–14. **Drive: 7 plays, 67 yards, 2:30.**
- BAL – Justin Tucker 43-yard field goal, 0:03. Chiefs 21–17. **Drive: 7 plays, 50 yards, 0:48.**

**Third quarter**

- KC – Byron Pringle 40-yard pass from Patrick Mahomes (Harrison Butker kick), 11:53. Chiefs 28–17. **Drive: 5 plays, 74 yards, 3:07.**
- BAL – Marquise Brown 42-yard pass from Lamar Jackson (Justin Tucker kick), 9:30. Chiefs 28–24. **Drive: 4 plays, 75 yards, 2:23.**
- KC – Travis Kelce 46-yard pass from Patrick Mahomes (Harrison Butker kick), 6:50. Chiefs 35–24. **Drive: 6 plays, 75 yards, 2:40.**

**Fourth quarter**

- BAL – Lamar Jackson 2-yard run (pass failed), 14:13. Chiefs 35–30. **Drive: 5 plays, 56 yards, 2:48.**
- BAL – Lamar Jackson 1-yard run (pass failed), 3:14. Ravens 36–35. **Drive: 14 plays, 68 yards, 8:02.**

**Top passers**

- KC – Patrick Mahomes – 24/31, 343 yards, 3 TD, INT
- BAL – Lamar Jackson – 18/26, 239 yards, TD, 2 INT

**Top rushers**

- KC – Clyde Edwards-Helaire 13 rushes, 46 yards
- BAL – Lamar Jackson – 16 rushes, 107 yards, 2 TD

**Top receivers**

- KC – Travis Kelce – 7 receptions, 109 yards, TD
- BAL – Marquise Brown – 6 receptions, 113 yards, TD

==== Week 3: vs. Los Angeles Chargers ====
Week 3: Los Angeles Chargers at Kansas City Chiefs – Game summary

Quarter	1	2	3	4	Total
**Chargers**	0	14	0	16	**30**
Chiefs	0	3	14	7	**24**

at Arrowhead Stadium, Kansas City, Missouri

- Date: September 26
- Game time: 12:00 p.m. CDT
- Game weather: Clear, 81 °F (27 °C)
- Game attendance: 72,980
- Referee: Shawn Hochuli
- TV announcers (CBS): Jim Nantz, Tony Romo and Tracy Wolfson
- Recap, Game Book

Game information

**First quarter**

- No scoring plays

**Second quarter**

- LAC – Keenan Allen 4-yard pass from Justin Herbert (kick failed, wide left), 13:57. Chargers 6–0. **Drive: 9 plays, 51 yards, 3:51.**
- LAC – Austin Ekeler 16-yard pass from Justin Herbert (Justin Herbert–Mike Williams pass), 7:36. Chargers 14–0. **Drive: 6 plays, 53 yards, 3:19.**
- KC – Harrison Butker 34-yard field goal, 0:19. Chargers 14–3. **Drive: 11 plays, 70 yards, 2:14.**

**Third quarter**

- KC – Jody Fortson 2-yard pass from Patrick Mahomes (Harrison Butker kick), 9:15. Chargers 14–10. **Drive: 12 plays, 75 yards, 5:45.**
- KC – Clyde Edwards-Helaire 10-yard pass from Patrick Mahomes (Harrison Butker kick), 3:35. Chiefs 17–14. **Drive: 10 plays, 70 yards, 4:09.**

**Fourth quarter**

- LAC – Mike Williams 20-yard pass from Justin Herbert (Tristan Vizcaino kick), 13:39. Chargers 21–17. **Drive: 11 plays, 75 yards, 4:56.**
- KC – Mecole Hardman 8-yard pass from Patrick Mahomes (Harrison Butker kick), 6:43. Chiefs 24–21. **Drive: 12 plays, 72 yards, 6:56.**
- LAC – Tristan Vizcaino 24-yard field goal, 2:14. Tied 24–24. **Drive: 10 plays, 69 yards, 4:29.**
- LAC – Mike Williams 4-yard pass from Justin Herbert (kick failed, wide left), 0:32. Chargers 30–24. **Drive: 8 plays, 59 yards, 1:10.**

**Top passers**

- LAC – Justin Herbert – 26/38, 281 yards, 4 TD
- KC – Patrick Mahomes – 27/40, 260 yards, 3 TD, 2 INT

**Top rushers**

- LAC – Austin Ekeler – 11 rushes, 55 yards
- KC – Clyde Edwards-Helaire – 17 rushes, 100 yards

**Top receivers**

- LAC – Mike Williams – 7 receptions, 122 yards, 2 TD
- KC – Travis Kelce – 7 receptions, 104 yards

==== Week 4: at Philadelphia Eagles ====
Week 4: Kansas City Chiefs at Philadelphia Eagles – Game summary

Quarter	1	2	3	4	Total
**Chiefs**	7	14	7	14	**42**
Eagles	10	3	3	14	**30**

at Lincoln Financial Field, Philadelphia, Pennsylvania

- Date: October 3
- Game time: 1:00 p.m. EDT/12:00 p.m. CDT
- Game weather: Partly cloudy, 73 °F (23 °C)
- Game attendance: 69,796
- Referee: Land Clark
- TV announcers (CBS): Ian Eagle, Charles Davis and Evan Washburn
- Recap, Game Book

Game information

**First quarter**

- PHI – Jake Elliott 29-yard field goal, 11:38. Eagles 3–0. **Drive: 8 plays, 64 yards, 3:22.**
- KC – Clyde Edwards-Helaire 1-yard pass from Patrick Mahomes (Harrison Butker kick), 8:02. Chiefs 7–3. **Drive: 8 plays, 77 yards, 3:36.**
- PHI – Dallas Goedert 3-yard pass from Jalen Hurts (Jake Elliott kick), 1:57. Eagles 10–7. **Drive: 12 plays, 84 yards, 6:05.**

**Second quarter**

- KC – Tyreek Hill 6-yard pass from Patrick Mahomes (Harrison Butker kick), 9:25. Chiefs 14–10. **Drive: 12 plays, 83 yards, 7:32.**
- PHI – Jake Elliott 25-yard field goal, 3:35. Chiefs 14–13. **Drive: 13 plays, 68 yards, 5:50.**
- KC – Jody Fortson 2-yard pass from Patrick Mahomes (Harrison Butker kick), 0:56. Chiefs 21–13. **Drive: 8 plays, 75 yards, 2:39.**

**Third quarter**

- PHI – Jake Elliott 31-yard field goal, 7:07. Chiefs 21–16. **Drive: 10 plays, 36 yards, 5:02.**
- KC – Darrel Williams 1-yard run (Harrison Butker kick), 0:51. Chiefs 28–16. **Drive: 8 plays, 75 yards, 6:16.**

**Fourth quarter**

- PHI – Kenneth Gainwell 7-yard run (Jake Elliott kick), 12:42. Chiefs 28–23. **Drive: 7 plays, 56 yards, 3:09.**
- KC – Tyreek Hill 12-yard pass from Patrick Mahomes (Harrison Butker kick), 6:44. Chiefs 35–23. **Drive: 11 plays, 75 yards, 5:58.**
- KC – Tyreek Hill 44-yard pass from Patrick Mahomes (Harrison Butker kick), 2:30. Chiefs 42–23. **Drive: 6 plays, 65 yards, 1:56.**
- PHI – Greg Ward 15-yard pass from Jalen Hurts (Jake Elliott kick), 0:04. Chiefs 42–30. **Drive: 10 plays, 75 yards, 2:26.**

**Top passers**

- KC – Patrick Mahomes – 24/30, 278 yards, 5 TD, INT
- PHI – Jalen Hurts – 32/48, 387 yards, 2 TD

**Top rushers**

- KC – Clyde Edwards-Helaire – 14 rushes, 102 yards
- PHI – Jalen Hurts – 8 rushes, 47 yards

**Top receivers**

- KC – Tyreek Hill – 11 receptions, 186 yards, 3 TD
- PHI – DeVonta Smith – 7 receptions, 122 yards

==== Week 5: vs. Buffalo Bills ====
Week 5: Buffalo Bills at Kansas City Chiefs – Game summary

Quarter	1	2	3	4	Total
**Bills**	7	17	7	7	**38**
Chiefs	3	10	0	7	**20**

at Arrowhead Stadium, Kansas City, Missouri

- Date: October 10
- Game time: 7:20 p.m. CDT
- Game weather: 71 °F (22 °C)
- Game attendance: 73,389
- Referee: Carl Cheffers
- TV announcers (NBC): Al Michaels, Cris Collinsworth and Michele Tafoya
- Recap, Game Book

Game information

**First quarter**

- KC – Harrison Butker 38-yard field goal, 8:31. Chiefs 3–0. **Drive: 17 plays, 56 yards, 6:29.**
- BUF – Josh Allen 9-yard run (Tyler Bass kick), 4:36. Bills 7–3. **Drive: 8 plays, 75 yards, 3:55.**

**Second quarter**

- KC – Byron Pringle 5-yard pass from Patrick Mahomes (Harrison Butker kick), 10:00. Chiefs 10–7. **Drive: 12 plays, 80 yards, 7:55.**
- BUF – Emmanuel Sanders 35-yard pass from Josh Allen (Tyler Bass kick), 7:45. Bills 14–10. **Drive: 5 plays, 75 yards, 2:15.**
- BUF – Tyler Bass 30-yard field goal, 3:13. Bills 17–10. **Drive: 7 plays, 62 yards, 2:33.**
- BUF – Dawson Knox 53-yard pass from Josh Allen (Tyler Bass kick), 1:16. Bills 24–10. **Drive: 2 plays, 68 yards, 0:34.**
- KC – Harrison Butker 54-yard field goal, 0:02. Bills 24–13. **Drive: 8 plays, 39 yards, 1:14.**

**Third quarter**

- BUF – Micah Hyde 26-yard interception return (Tyler Bass kick), 7:12. Bills 31–13.

**Fourth quarter**

- KC – Travis Kelce 1-yard pass from Patrick Mahomes (Harrison Butker kick), 13:42. Bills 31–20. **Drive: 7 plays, 52 yards, 2:32.**
- BUF – Emmanuel Sanders 8-yard pass from Josh Allen (Tyler Bass kick), 5:51. Bills 38–20. **Drive: 12 plays, 85 yards, 7:51.**

**Top passers**

- BUF – Josh Allen – 15/26, 315 yards, 3 TD
- KC – Patrick Mahomes – 33/54, 272 yards, 2 TD, 2 INT

**Top rushers**

- BUF – Josh Allen – 11 rushes, 59 yards, TD
- KC – Patrick Mahomes – 8 rushes, 61 yards

**Top receivers**

- BUF – Dawson Knox – 3 receptions, 117 yards, TD
- KC – Mecole Hardman – 9 receptions, 76 yards

==== Week 6: at Washington Football Team ====
Week 6: Kansas City Chiefs at Washington Football Team – Game summary

Quarter	1	2	3	4	Total
**Chiefs**	7	3	7	14	**31**
Washington	3	10	0	0	**13**

at FedExField, Landover, Maryland

- Date: October 17
- Game time: 1:00 p.m. EDT/12:00 p.m. CDT
- Game weather: Sunny, 62 °F (17 °C)
- Game attendance: 51,322
- Referee: Adrian Hill
- TV announcers (CBS): Ian Eagle, Charles Davis and Evan Washburn
- Recap, Game Book

Game information

**First quarter**

- KC – Darrel Williams 2-yard run (Harrison Butker kick), 9:09. Chiefs 7–0. **Drive: 10 plays, 95 yards, 4:50.**
- WAS – Dustin Hopkins 50-yard field goal, 3:30. Chiefs 7–3. **Drive: 12 plays, 43 yards, 5:39.**

**Second quarter**

- KC – Harrison Butker 52-yard field goal, 12:33. Chiefs 10–3. **Drive: 4 plays, 7 yards, 1:06.**
- WAS – Dustin Hopkins 43-yard field goal, 8:07. Chiefs 10–6. **Drive: 9 plays, 50 yards, 4:26.**
- WAS – Ricky Seals-Jones 39-yard pass from Taylor Heinicke (Dustin Hopkins kick), 1:18. Football Team 13–10. **Drive: 8 plays, 67 yards, 3:32.**

**Third quarter**

- KC – Tyreek Hill 2-yard pass from Patrick Mahomes (Harrison Butker kick), 4:07. Chiefs 17–13. **Drive: 10 plays, 68 yards, 4:18.**

**Fourth quarter**

- KC – Darrel Williams 3-yard run (Harrison Butker kick), 14:02. Chiefs 24–13. **Drive: 8 plays, 45 yards, 3:36.**
- KC – Demarcus Robinson 24-yard pass from Patrick Mahomes (Harrison Butker kick), 3:14. Chiefs 31–13. **Drive: 15 plays, 96 yards, 7:18.**

**Top passers**

- KC – Patrick Mahomes – 32/47, 397 yards, 2 TD, 2 INT
- WAS – Taylor Heinicke – 24/39, 182 yards, TD, INT

**Top rushers**

- KC – Darrel Williams – 21 rushes, 62 yards, 2 TD
- WAS – J. D. McKissic – 8 rushes, 45 yards

**Top receivers**

- KC – Travis Kelce – 8 receptions, 99 yards
- WAS – J. D. McKissic – 8 receptions, 65 yards

==== Week 7: at Tennessee Titans ====
Week 7: Kansas City Chiefs at Tennessee Titans – Game summary

Quarter	1	2	3	4	Total
Chiefs	0	0	3	0	**3**
**Titans**	14	13	0	0	**27**

at Nissan Stadium, Nashville, Tennessee

- Date: October 24
- Game time: 12:00 p.m. CDT
- Game weather: Cloudy, 70 °F (21 °C)
- Game attendance: 69,484
- Referee: Brad Allen
- TV announcers (CBS): Ian Eagle, Charles Davis and Evan Washburn
- Recap, Game Book

Game information

**First quarter**

- TEN – MyCole Pruitt 5-yard pass from Derrick Henry (Randy Bullock kick), 10:50. Titans 7–0. **Drive: 8 plays, 75 yards, 4:10.**
- TEN – A. J. Brown 24-yard pass from Ryan Tannehill (Randy Bullock kick), 0:42. Titans 14–0. **Drive: 9 plays, 97 yards, 5:34.**

**Second quarter**

- TEN – Randy Bullock 34-yard field goal, 8:07. Titans 17–0. **Drive: 12 plays, 60 yards, 6:39.**
- TEN – Ryan Tannehill 2-yard run (Randy Bullock kick), 2:48. Titans 24–0. **Drive: 8 plays, 46 yards, 5:08.**
- TEN – Randy Bullock 51-yard field goal, 0:03. Titans 27–0. **Drive: 8 plays, 18 yards, 1:45.**

**Third quarter**

- KC – Harrison Butker 42-yard field goal, 11:00. Titans 27–3. **Drive: 10 plays, 51 yards, 4:00.**

**Fourth quarter**

- No scoring plays.

**Top passers**

- KC – Patrick Mahomes – 20/35, 206 yards, INT
- TEN – Ryan Tannehill – 21/27, 270 yards, TD, INT

**Top rushers**

- KC – Patrick Mahomes – 6 rushes, 35 yards
- TEN – Derrick Henry – 29 rushes, 86 yards

**Top receivers**

- KC – Byron Pringle – 5 receptions, 73 yards
- TEN – A. J. Brown – 8 receptions, 133 yards, TD

==== Week 8: vs. New York Giants ====
Week 8: New York Giants at Kansas City Chiefs – Game summary

Quarter	1	2	3	4	Total
Giants	0	10	0	7	**17**
**Chiefs**	7	7	0	6	**20**

at Arrowhead Stadium, Kansas City, Missouri

- Date: November 1
- Game time: 7:15 p.m. CDT
- Game weather: 39 °F (4 °C)
- Game attendance: 72,898
- Referee: Jerome Boger
- TV announcers (ESPN): Steve Levy, Brian Griese, Louis Riddick and Lisa Salters
- Recap, Game Book

Game information

**First quarter**

- KC – Tyreek Hill 6-yard pass from Patrick Mahomes (Harrison Butker kick), 6:12. Chiefs 7–0. **Drive: 4 plays, 13 yards, 1:25.**

**Second quarter**

- NYG – Kyle Rudolph 1-yard pass from Daniel Jones (Graham Gano kick), 14:14. Tied 7–7. **Drive: 9 plays, 85 yards, 4:02.**
- KC – Derrick Gore 3-yard run (Harrison Butker kick), 6:37. Chiefs 14–7. **Drive: 11 plays, 68 yards, 5:46.**
- NYG – Graham Gano 23-yard field goal, 2:45. Chiefs 14–10. **Drive: 8 plays, 86 yards, 3:52.**

**Third quarter**

- No scoring plays.

**Fourth quarter**

- NYG – Evan Engram 5-yard pass from Daniel Jones (Graham Gano kick), 14:53. Giants 17–14. **Drive: 8 plays, 57 yards, 3:34.**
- KC – Harrison Butker 36-yard field goal, 8:53. Tied 17–17. **Drive: 14 plays, 57 yards, 6:00.**
- KC – Harrison Butker 34-yard field goal, 1:07. Chiefs 20–17. **Drive: 9 plays, 55 yards, 3:34.**

**Top passers**

- NYG – Daniel Jones – 22/32, 222 yards, 2 TD, INT
- KC – Patrick Mahomes – 29/48, 275 yards, TD, INT

**Top rushers**

- NYG – Devontae Booker – 15 rushes, 60 yards
- KC – Darrel Williams – 13 rushes, 49 yards

**Top receivers**

- NYG – John Ross – 2 receptions, 72 yards
- KC – Tyreek Hill – 12 receptions, 94 yards, TD

==== Week 9: vs. Green Bay Packers ====
Week 9: Green Bay Packers at Kansas City Chiefs – Game summary

Quarter	1	2	3	4	Total
Packers	0	0	0	7	**7**
**Chiefs**	7	6	0	0	**13**

at Arrowhead Stadium, Kansas City, Missouri

- Date: November 7
- Game time: 3:25 p.m. CST
- Game weather: 51 °F (11 °C)
- Game attendance: 73,476
- Referee: Shawn Smith
- TV announcers (Fox): Joe Buck, Troy Aikman, Erin Andrews and Tom Rinaldi
- Recap, Game Book

Game information

**First quarter**

- KC – Travis Kelce 1-yard pass from Patrick Mahomes (Harrison Butker kick), 5:56. Chiefs 7–0. **Drive: 15 plays, 64 yards, 7:55.**

**Second quarter**

- KC – Harrison Butker 24-yard field goal, 1:51. Chiefs 10–0. **Drive: 4 plays, 4 yards, 0:50.**
- KC – Harrison Butker 55-yard field goal, 0:01. Chiefs 13–0. **Drive: 5 plays, 25 yards, 0:26.**

**Third quarter**

- No scoring plays.

**Fourth quarter**

- GB – Allen Lazard 20-yard pass from Jordan Love (Mason Crosby kick), 4:54. Chiefs 13–7. **Drive: 10 plays, 53 yards, 2:57.**

**Top passers**

- GB – Jordan Love – 19/34, 190 yards, TD, INT
- KC – Patrick Mahomes – 20/37, 166 yards, TD

**Top rushers**

- GB – Aaron Jones – 12 rushes, 53 yards
- KC – Darrel Williams – 19 rushes, 70 yards

**Top receivers**

- GB – Randall Cobb – 3 receptions, 50 yards
- KC – Travis Kelce – 5 receptions, 68 yards, TD

==== Week 10: at Las Vegas Raiders ====
Week 10: Kansas City Chiefs at Las Vegas Raiders – Game summary

Quarter	1	2	3	4	Total
**Chiefs**	7	10	10	14	**41**
Raiders	0	7	7	0	**14**

at Allegiant Stadium, Paradise, Nevada

- Date: November 14
- Game time: 7:20 p.m. CST/5:20 p.m. PST
- Game weather: None (indoor stadium)
- Game attendance: 62,125
- Referee: Bill Vinovich
- TV announcers (NBC): Al Michaels, Cris Collinsworth and Michele Tafoya
- Recap, Game Book

Game information

**First quarter**

- KC – Tyreek Hill 8-yard pass from Patrick Mahomes (Harrison Butker kick), 2:51. Chiefs 7–0. **Drive: 11 plays, 89 yards, 5:45.**

**Second quarter**

- LV – Hunter Renfrow 6-yard pass from Derek Carr (Daniel Carlson kick), 12:57. Tied 7–7. **Drive: 5 plays, 50 yards, 2:33.**
- KC – Harrison Butker 40-yard field goal, 8:24. Chiefs 10–7. **Drive: 9 plays, 53 yards, 4:33.**
- KC – Tyreek Hill 1-yard pass from Patrick Mahomes (Harrison Butker kick), 1:39. Chiefs 17–7. **Drive: 10 plays, 58 yards, 4:19.**

**Third quarter**

- LV – Bryan Edwards 37-yard pass from Derek Carr (Daniel Carlson kick), 12:08. Chiefs 17–14. **Drive: 5 plays, 75 yards, 2:52.**
- KC – Noah Gray 1-yard pass from Patrick Mahomes (Harrison Butker kick), 7:09. Chiefs 24–14. **Drive: 13 plays, 82 yards, 4:59.**
- KC – Harrison Butker 35-yard field goal, 0:57. Chiefs 27–14. **Drive: 8 plays, 56 yards, 4:37.**

**Fourth quarter**

- KC – Darrel Williams 38-yard pass from Patrick Mahomes (Harrison Butker kick), 13:11. Chiefs 34–14. **Drive: 7 plays, 56 yards, 1:59.**
- KC – Byron Pringle 22-yard pass from Patrick Mahomes (Harrison Butker kick), 7:39. Chiefs 41–14. **Drive: 7 plays, 80 yards, 4:09.**

**Top passers**

- KC – Patrick Mahomes – 35/50, 406 yards, 5 TD
- LV – Derek Carr – 25/35, 261 yards, 2 TD, INT

**Top rushers**

- KC – Darrel Williams – 11 rushes, 43 yards
- LV – Derek Carr – 3 rushes, 18 yards

**Top receivers**

- KC – Travis Kelce – 8 receptions, 119 yards
- LV – Bryan Edwards – 3 receptions, 88 yards, TD

==== Week 11: vs. Dallas Cowboys ====
Week 11: Dallas Cowboys at Kansas City Chiefs – Game summary

Quarter	1	2	3	4	Total
Cowboys	3	0	3	3	**9**
**Chiefs**	9	7	3	0	**19**

at Arrowhead Stadium, Kansas City, Missouri

- Date: November 21
- Game time: 3:25 p.m. CST
- Game weather: 58 °F (14 °C)
- Game attendance: 73,494
- Referee: John Hussey
- TV announcers (Fox): Joe Buck, Troy Aikman, Erin Andrews and Tom Rinaldi
- Recap, Game Book

Game information

**First quarter**

- KC – Travis Kelce 4-yard run (kick failed, wide right), 10:01. Chiefs 6–0. **Drive: 9 plays, 86 yards, 3:47.**
- KC – Harrison Butker 37-yard field goal, 7:55. Chiefs 9–0. **Drive: 4 plays, 3 yards, 0:58.**
- DAL – Greg Zuerlein 33-yard field goal, 2:50. Chiefs 9–3. **Drive: 10 plays, 60 yards, 5:05.**

**Second quarter**

- KC – Clyde Edwards-Helaire 1-yard run (Harrison Butker kick), 14:08. Chiefs 16–3. **Drive: 8 plays, 65 yards, 3:42.**

**Third quarter**

- DAL – Greg Zuerlein 30-yard field goal, 9:21. Chiefs 16–6. **Drive: 7 plays, 24 yards, 2:02.**
- KC – Harrison Butker 53-yard field goal, 2:36. Chiefs 19–6. **Drive: 7 plays, 41 yards, 3:13.**

**Fourth quarter**

- DAL – Greg Zuerlein 48-yard field goal, 12:52. Chiefs 19–9. **Drive: 9 plays, 45 yards, 4:44.**

**Top passers**

- DAL – Dak Prescott – 28/43, 216 yards, 2 INT
- KC – Patrick Mahomes – 23/37, 260 yards, INT

**Top rushers**

- DAL – Tony Pollard – 7 rushes, 50 yards
- KC – Clyde Edwards-Helaire – 12 rushes, 63 yards, TD

**Top receivers**

- DAL – Dalton Schultz – 6 receptions, 53 yards
- KC – Tyreek Hill – 9 receptions, 77 yards

==== Week 13: vs. Denver Broncos ====
Week 13: Denver Broncos at Kansas City Chiefs – Game summary

Quarter	1	2	3	4	Total
Broncos	0	3	0	6	**9**
**Chiefs**	10	0	3	9	**22**

at Arrowhead Stadium, Kansas City, Missouri

- Date: December 5
- Game time: 7:20 p.m. CST
- Game weather: 55 °F (13 °C)
- Game attendance: 73,185
- Referee: Carl Cheffers
- TV announcers (NBC): Al Michaels, Cris Collinsworth and Kathryn Tappen
- Recap, Game Book

Game information

**First quarter**

- KC – Patrick Mahomes 10-yard run (Harrison Butker kick), 6:56. Chiefs 7–0. **Drive: 12 plays, 72 yards, 6:03.**
- KC – Harrison Butker 56-yard field goal, 2:22. Chiefs 10–0. **Drive: 9 plays, 42 yards, 3:30.**

**Second quarter**

- DEN – Brandon McManus 42-yard field goal, 13:34. Chiefs 10–3. **Drive: 10 plays, 51 yards, 3:48.**

**Third quarter**

- KC – Harrison Butker 45-yard field goal, 5:35. Chiefs 13–3. **Drive: 7 plays, 50 yards, 3:23.**

**Fourth quarter**

- KC – Harrison Butker 26-yard field goal, 13:26. Chiefs 16–3. **Drive: 4 plays, 8 yards, 1:34.**
- KC – Daniel Sorensen 75-yard interception return (kick failed, wide left), 9:42. Chiefs 22–3.
- DEN – Javonte Williams 13-yard pass from Teddy Bridgewater (pass failed), 5:12. Chiefs 22–9. **Drive: 11 plays, 75 yards, 4:30.**

**Top passers**

- DEN – Teddy Bridgewater – 22/40, 257 yards, TD, 2 INT
- KC – Patrick Mahomes – 15/29, 184 yards, INT

**Top rushers**

- DEN – Javonte Williams – 23 rushes, 102 yards
- KC – Clyde Edwards-Helaire – 14 rushes, 54 yards

**Top receivers**

- DEN – Jerry Jeudy – 4 receptions, 77 yards
- KC – Darrel Williams – 3 receptions, 60 yards

==== Week 14: vs. Las Vegas Raiders ====
Week 14: Las Vegas Raiders at Kansas City Chiefs – Game summary

Quarter	1	2	3	4	Total
Raiders	0	3	6	0	**9**
**Chiefs**	14	21	3	10	**48**

at Arrowhead Stadium, Kansas City, Missouri

- Date: December 12
- Game time: 12:00 p.m. CST
- Game weather: 50 °F (10 °C)
- Game attendance: 73,278
- Referee: Brad Allen
- TV announcers (CBS): Ian Eagle, Charles Davis and Evan Washburn
- Recap, Game Book

Game information

**First quarter**

- KC – Mike Hughes 23-yard fumble return (Harrison Butker kick), 14:43. Chiefs 7–0.
- KC – Darrel Williams 23-yard pass from Patrick Mahomes (Harrison Butker kick), 3:43. Chiefs 14–0. **Drive: 5 plays, 80 yards, 2:18.**

**Second quarter**

- KC – Clyde Edwards-Helaire 5-yard run (Harrison Butker kick), 12:13. Chiefs 21–0. **Drive: 7 plays, 80 yards, 4:22.**
- KC – Josh Gordon 1-yard pass from Patrick Mahomes (Harrison Butker kick), 6:17. Chiefs 28–0. **Drive: 9 plays, 39 yards, 5:02.**
- KC – Clyde Edwards-Helaire 6-yard run (Harrison Butker kick), 1:40. Chiefs 35–0. **Drive: 7 plays, 62 yards, 3:18.**
- LV – Daniel Carlson 26-yard field goal, 0:00. Chiefs 35–3. **Drive: 14 plays, 68 yards, 1:40.**

**Third quarter**

- KC – Harrison Butker 54-yard field goal, 8:25. Chiefs 38–3. **Drive: 10 plays, 41 yards, 6:35.**
- LV – Hunter Renfrow 4-yard pass from Derek Carr (kick failed, wide left), 3:29. Chiefs 38–9. **Drive: 10 plays, 69 yards, 4:56.**

**Fourth quarter**

- KC – Harrison Butker 37-yard field goal, 9:52. Chiefs 41–9. **Drive: 14 plays, 56 yards, 8:37.**
- KC – Derrick Gore 51-yard run (Harrison Butker kick), 7:19. Chiefs 48–9. **Drive: 1 play, 51 yards, 0:09.**

**Top passers**

- LV – Derek Carr – 33/45, 263 yards, TD, INT
- KC – Patick Mahomes – 20/24, 254 yards, 2 TD

**Top rushers**

- LV – Josh Jacobs – 9 rushes, 24 yards
- KC – Derrick Gore – 9 rushes, 66 yards, TD

**Top receivers**

- LV – Hunter Renfrow – 13 receptions, 117 yards, TD
- KC – Tyreek Hill – 4 receptions, 76 yards

==== Week 15: at Los Angeles Chargers ====
Week 15: Kansas City Chiefs at Los Angeles Chargers – Game summary

Quarter	1	2	3	4	OT	Total
**Chiefs**	7	3	3	15	6	**34**
Chargers	0	14	0	14	0	**28**

at SoFi Stadium, Inglewood, California

- Date: December 16
- Game time: 7:20 p.m. CST/5:20 p.m. CST
- Game weather: None (retractable roof closed)
- Game attendance: 70,240
- Referee: Shawn Smith
- TV announcers (Fox/NFLN/Prime Video): Joe Buck, Troy Aikman, Erin Andrews and Kristina Pink
- Recap, Game Book

Game information

**First quarter**

- KC – Michael Burton 7-yard run (Harrison Butker kick), 7:34. Chiefs 7–0. **11 plays, 95 yards, 5:53**

**Second quarter**

- KC – Harrison Butker 30-yard field goal, 14:48. Chiefs 10–0. **Drive: 10 plays, 46 yards, 5:30.**
- LAC – Justin Herbert 1-yard run (Dustin Hopkins kick), 9:12. Chiefs 10–7. **Drive: 10 plays, 75 yards, 5:36.**
- LAC – Jalen Guyton 4-yard pass from Justin Herbert (Dustin Hopkins kick), 3:15. Chargers 14–10. **Drive: 9 plays, 42 yards, 4:56.**

**Third quarter**

- KC – Harrison Butker 33-yard field goal, 12:12. Chargers 14–13. **Drive: 7 plays, 61 yards, 2:48.**

**Fourth quarter**

- LAC – Austin Ekeler 2-yard run (Dustin Hopkins kick), 9:29. Chargers 21–13. **Drive: 1 play, 2 yards, 0:05.**
- KC – Tyreek Hill 1-yard pass from Patrick Mahomes (Patrick Mahomes–Clyde Edwards-Helaire pass), 7:44. Tied 21–21. **Drive: 5 plays, 75 yards, 1:45.**
- LAC – Keenan Allen 8-yard pass from Justin Herbert (Dustin Hopkins kick), 2:19. Chargers 28–21. **Drive: 11 plays, 75 yards, 5:25.**
- KC – Travis Kelce 7-yard pass from Patrick Mahomes (Harrison Butker kick), 1:16. Tied 28–28. **Drive: 8 plays, 75 yards, 1:03.**

**Overtime**

- KC – Travis Kelce 34-yard pass from Patrick Mahomes, 8:45. Chiefs 34–28. **Drive: 5 plays, 75 yards, 1:15.**

**Top passers**

- KC – Patrick Mahomes – 31/47, 410 yards, 3 TD, INT
- LAC – Justin Herbert – 22/38, 236 yards, 2 TD, INT

**Top rushers**

- KC – Patrick Mahomes – 3 rushes, 32 yards
- LAC – Justin Jackson – 13 rushes, 86 yards

**Top receivers**

- KC – Travis Kelce – 10 receptions, 191 yards, 2 TD
- LAC – Keenan Allen – 6 receptions, 78 yards, TD

==== Week 16: vs. Pittsburgh Steelers ====
Week 16: Pittsburgh Steelers at Kansas City Chiefs – Game summary

Quarter	1	2	3	4	Total
Steelers	0	0	3	7	**10**
**Chiefs**	14	9	7	6	**36**

at Arrowhead Stadium, Kansas City, Missouri

- Date: December 26
- Game time: 3:25 p.m. CST
- Game weather: 57 °F (14 °C)
- Game attendance: 73,371
- Referee: Jerome Boger
- TV announcers (CBS): Jim Nantz, Tony Romo and Tracy Wolfson
- Recap, Game Book

Game information

**First quarter**

- KC – Clyde Edwards-Helaire 7-yard run (Elliott Fry kick), 4:07. Chiefs 7–0. **Drive: 14 plays, 73 yards, 8:10.**
- KC – Byron Pringle 5-yard pass from Patrick Mahomes (Elliott Fry kick), 1:05. Chiefs 14–0. **Drive: 6 plays, 49 yards, 2:54.**

**Second quarter**

- KC – Elliott Fry 44-yard field goal, 8:45. Chiefs 17–0. **Drive: 10 plays, 54 yards, 5:01.**
- KC – Mecole Hardman 8-yard pass from Patrick Mahomes (kick failed, wide left), 2:13. Chiefs 23–0. **Drive: 6 plays, 74 yards, 2:50.**

**Third quarter**

- KC – Byron Pringle 16-yard pass from Patrick Mahomes (Elliott Fry kick), 8:53. Chiefs 30–0. **Drive: 7 plays, 51 yards, 3:51.**
- PIT – Chris Boswell 34-yard field goal, 3:34. Chiefs 30–3. **Drive: 15 plays, 54 yards, 5:19.**

**Fourth quarter**

- KC – Elliott Fry 34-yard field goal, 11:57. Chiefs 33–3. **Drive: 12 plays, 59 yards, 6:37.**
- KC – Elliott Fry 30-yard field goal, 9:41. Chiefs 36–3. **Drive: 4 plays, −5 yards, 2:02.**
- PIT – Diontae Johnson 15-yard pass from Ben Roethlisberger (Chris Boswell kick), 2:54. Chiefs 36–10. **Drive: 17 plays, 85 yards, 6:47.**

**Top passers**

- PIT – Ben Roethlisberger – 23/35, 159 yards, TD, INT
- KC – Patrick Mahomes – 23/30, 258 yards, 3 TD

**Top rushers**

- PIT – Najee Harris – 19 rushes, 93 yards
- KC – Darrel Williams – 11 rushes, 55 yards

**Top receivers**

- PIT – Diontae Johnson – 6 receptions, 51 yards, TD
- KC – Byron Pringle – 6 receptions, 75 yards, 2 TD

==== Week 17: at Cincinnati Bengals ====
Week 17: Kansas City Chiefs at Cincinnati Bengals – Game summary

Quarter	1	2	3	4	Total
Chiefs	14	14	0	3	**31**
**Bengals**	7	10	7	10	**34**

at Paul Brown Stadium, Cincinnati, Ohio

- Date: January 2
- Game time: 1:00 p.m. EST/12:00 p.m. CST
- Game weather: Cloudy, 33 °F (1 °C)
- Game attendance: 64,505
- Referee: Ronald Torbert
- TV announcers (CBS): Jim Nantz, Tony Romo and Tracy Wolfson
- Recap, Game Book

Game information

**First quarter**

- KC – Demarcus Robinson 29-yard pass from Patrick Mahomes (Harrison Butker kick), 9:21. Chiefs 7–0. **Drive: 5 plays, 72 yards, 2:38.**
- KC – Travis Kelce 3-yard pass from Patrick Mahomes (Harrison Butker kick), 2:50. Chiefs 14–0. **Drive: 7 plays, 63 yards, 3:50.**
- CIN – Ja'Marr Chase 72-yard pass from Joe Burrow (Evan McPherson kick), 2:01. Chiefs 14–7. **Drive: 2 plays, 75 yards, 0:49.**

**Second quarter**

- KC – Darrel Williams 1-yard run (Harrison Butker kick), 12:56. Chiefs 21–7. **Drive: 9 plays, 75 yards, 4:05.**
- CIN – Ja'Marr Chase 18-yard pass from Joe Burrow (Evan McPherson kick), 7:42. Chiefs 21–14. **Drive: 9 plays, 75 yards, 5:14.**
- KC – Darrel Williams 1-yard run (Harrison Butker kick), 2:18. Chiefs 28–14. **Drive: 9 plays, 73 yards, 5:24.**
- CIN – Evan McPherson 46-yard field goal, 0:41. Chiefs 28–17. **Drive: 11 plays, 47 yards, 1:37.**

**Third quarter**

- CIN – Ja'Marr Chase 69-yard pass from Joe Burrow (Evan McPherson kick), 13:30. Chiefs 28–24. **Drive: 3 plays, 75 yards, 1:30.**

**Fourth quarter**

- CIN – Tyler Boyd 5-yard pass from Joe Burrow (Evan McPherson kick), 11:44. Bengals 31–28. **Drive: 8 plays, 86 yards, 4:27.**
- KC – Harrison Butker 34-yard field goal, 6:01. Tied 31–31. **Drive: 11 plays, 52 yards, 5:43.**
- CIN – Evan McPherson 20-yard field goal, 0:00. Bengals 34–31. **Drive: 15 plays, 74 yards, 6:01.**

**Top passers**

- KC – Patrick Mahomes – 26/35, 259 yards, 2 TD
- CIN – Joe Burrow – 30/39, 446 yards, 4 TD

**Top rushers**

- KC – Darrel Williams – 14 rushes, 88 yards, 2 TD
- CIN – Joe Mixon – 12 rushes, 46 yards

**Top receivers**

- KC – Mecole Hardman – 1 reception, 53 yards
- CIN – Ja'Marr Chase – 11 receptions, 266 yards, 3 TD

With the loss, the Chiefs failed to secure the No. 1 seed in the AFC.

==== Week 18: at Denver Broncos ====
Week 18: Kansas City Chiefs at Denver Broncos – Game summary

Quarter	1	2	3	4	Total
**Chiefs**	7	3	7	11	**28**
Broncos	7	7	7	3	**24**

at Empower Field at Mile High, Denver, Colorado

- Date: January 8
- Game time: 3:30 p.m. CST/2:30 p.m. MST
- Game weather: Cloudy, 44 °F (7 °C)
- Game attendance: 76,012
- Referee: Brad Rogers
- TV announcers (ESPN/ABC): Chris Fowler, Kirk Herbstreit and Laura Rutledge
- Recap, Game Book

Game information

**First quarter**

- KC – Travis Kelce 3-yard pass from Patrick Mahomes (Harrison Butker kick), 6:08. Chiefs 7–0. **Drive: 17 plays, 91 yards, 7:49.**
- DEN – Drew Lock 5-yard run (Brandon McManus kick), 0:26. Tied 7–7. **Drive: 12 plays, 67 yards, 5:42.**

**Second quarter**

- DEN – Drew Lock 23-yard run (Brandon McManus kick), 7:49. Broncos 14–7. **Drive: 8 plays, 80 yards, 5:07.**
- KC – Harrison Butker 34-yard field goal, 2:18. Broncos 14–10. **Drive: 13 plays, 59 yards, 5:31.**

**Third quarter**

- KC – Jerick McKinnon 14-yard pass from Patrick Mahomes (Harrison Butker kick), 10:43. Chiefs 17–14. **Drive: 9 plays, 75 yards, 4:17.**
- DEN – Melvin Gordon 47-yard run (Brandon McManus kick), 9:02. Broncos 21–17. **Drive: 5 plays, 75 yards, 1:41.**

**Fourth quarter**

- KC – Harrison Butker 51-yard field goal, 14:44. Broncos 21–20. **Drive: 10 plays, 25 yards, 4:33.**
- KC – Nick Bolton 86-yard fumble return (Patrick Mahomes run), 7:42. Chiefs 28–21.
- DEN – Brandon McManus 31-yard field goal, 4:37. Chiefs 28–24. **Drive: 8 plays, 62 yards, 3:05.**

**Top passers**

- KC – Patrick Mahomes – 27/44, 270 yards, 2 TD
- DEN – Drew Lock – 12/24, 162 yards

**Top rushers**

- KC – Patrick Mahomes – 9 rushes, 54 yards
- DEN – Melvin Gordon – 12 rushes, 110 yards, TD

**Top receivers**

- KC – Mecole Hardman – 8 reception, 103 yards
- DEN – Tim Patrick – 6 receptions, 95 yards

=== Standings ===
==== Division ====
AFC West
	W	L	T	PCT	DIV	CONF	PF	PA	STK
^{(2)} Kansas City Chiefs	12	5	0	.706	5–1	7–5	480	364	W1
^{(5)} Las Vegas Raiders	10	7	0	.588	3–3	8–4	374	439	W4
Los Angeles Chargers	9	8	0	.529	3–3	6–6	474	459	L1
Denver Broncos	7	10	0	.412	1–5	3–9	335	322	L4

==== Conference ====
AFC
#	Team	Division	W	L	T	PCT	DIV	CONF	SOS	SOV	STK
**Division winners**
1 (Note: Tennessee finished ahead of Kansas City based on head-to-head victory, claiming the No. 1 seed.)	Tennessee Titans	South	12	5	0	.706	5–1	8–4	.472	.480	W3
2	Kansas City Chiefs	West	12	5	0	.706	5–1	7–5	.538	.517	W1
3	Buffalo Bills	East	11	6	0	.647	5–1	7–5	.472	.428	W4
4	Cincinnati Bengals	North	10	7	0	.588	4–2	8–4	.472	.462	L1
**Wild cards**
5 (Note: Las Vegas claimed the No. 5 seed over New England based on win percentage in common games (5–1 vs. 2–4 against: Miami, Dallas, LA Chargers, Cleveland, and Indianapolis).)	Las Vegas Raiders	West	10	7	0	.588	3–3	8–4	.510	.515	W4
6	New England Patriots	East	10	7	0	.588	3–3	8–4	.481	.394	L1
7	Pittsburgh Steelers	North	9	7	1	.559	4–2	7–5	.521	.490	W2
**Did not qualify for the postseason**
8 (Note: Indianapolis finished ahead of Miami and Los Angeles based on conference record (7–5 vs. 6–6).)	Indianapolis Colts	South	9	8	0	.529	3–3	7–5	.495	.431	L2
9 (Note: Miami finished ahead of LA Chargers based on win percentage in common games (5–1 vs. 2–4 against: New England, Las Vegas, Houston, Baltimore, and NY Giants).)	Miami Dolphins	East	9	8	0	.529	4–2	6–6	.464	.379	W1
10	Los Angeles Chargers	West	9	8	0	.529	3–3	6–6	.510	.500	L1
11 (Note: Cleveland finished ahead of Baltimore based on division record (3–3 vs. 1–5).)	Cleveland Browns	North	8	9	0	.471	3–3	5–7	.514	.415	W1
12	Baltimore Ravens	North	8	9	0	.471	1–5	5–7	.531	.460	L6
13	Denver Broncos	West	7	10	0	.412	1–5	3–9	.484	.357	L4
14 (Note: NY Jets finished ahead of Houston based on head-to-head victory.)	New York Jets	East	4	13	0	.235	0–6	4–8	.512	.426	L2
15	Houston Texans	South	4	13	0	.235	3–3	4–8	.498	.397	L2
16	Jacksonville Jaguars	South	3	14	0	.176	1–5	3–9	.512	.569	W1
**Tiebreakers** (Note: When breaking ties for three or more teams under the NFL's rules, they are first broken within divisions, then comparing only the highest-ranked remaining team from each division.)

== Postseason ==
=== Schedule ===
Round	Date	Opponent (seed)	Result	Record	Venue	Recap
Wild Card	January 16	Pittsburgh Steelers (7)	W 42–21	1–0	Arrowhead Stadium	Recap
Divisional	January 23	Buffalo Bills (3)	W 42–36 (OT)	2–0	Arrowhead Stadium	Recap
AFC Championship	January 30	Cincinnati Bengals (4)	L 24–27 (OT)	2–1	Arrowhead Stadium	Recap

=== Game summaries ===
==== AFC Wild Card Playoffs: vs. (7) Pittsburgh Steelers ====
AFC Wild Card Playoffs: (7) Pittsburgh Steelers at (2) Kansas City Chiefs – Game summary

Quarter	1	2	3	4	Total
Steelers	0	7	7	7	21
Chiefs	0	21	14	7	42

at Arrowhead Stadium, Kansas City, Missouri

- Date: January 16, 2022
- Game time: 7:15 p.m. CST
- Game weather: 30 °F (−1 °C)
- Game attendance: 73,253
- Referee: Shawn Smith
- TV announcers (NBC): Al Michaels, Cris Collinsworth and Michele Tafoya
- Recap, Game Book

Game information

First quarter

- No scoring plays.

Second quarter

- PIT – T. J. Watt 26-yard fumble return (Chris Boswell kick), 10:41. Steelers 7–0.
- KC – Jerick McKinnon 4-yard pass from Patrick Mahomes (Harrison Butker kick), 5:45. Tied 7–7. Drive: 8 plays, 76 yards, 4:56.
- KC – Byron Pringle 12-yard pass from Patrick Mahomes (Harrison Butker kick), 1:55. Chiefs 14–7. Drive: 7 plays, 74 yards, 2:43.
- KC – Travis Kelce 48-yard pass from Patrick Mahomes (Harrison Butker kick), 0:13. Chiefs 21–7. Drive: 6 plays, 80 yards, 0:39.

Third quarter

- KC – Nick Allegretti 1-yard pass from Patrick Mahomes (Harrison Butker kick), 10:13. Chiefs 28–7. Drive: 9 plays, 68 yards, 4:47.
- KC – Tyreek Hill 31-yard pass from Patrick Mahomes (Harrison Butker kick), 9:14. Chiefs 35–7. Drive: 2 plays, 29 yards, 0:42.
- PIT – Diontae Johnson 13-yard pass from Ben Roethlisberger (Chris Boswell kick), 4:10. Chiefs 35–14. Drive: 10 plays, 75 yards, 5:04.

Fourth quarter

- KC – Byron Pringle 2-yard pass from Travis Kelce (Harrison Butker kick), 14:13. Chiefs 42–14. Drive: 9 plays, 75 yards, 4:57.
- PIT – James Washington 15-yard pass from Ben Roethlisberger (Chris Boswell kick), 7:36. Chiefs 42–21. Drive: 15 plays, 75 yards, 6:37.

Top passers

- PIT – Ben Roethlisberger – 29/44, 215 yards, 2 TD
- KC – Patrick Mahomes – 30/39, 404 yards, 5 TD, INT

Top rushers

- PIT – Najee Harris – 12 rushes, 29 yards
- KC – Jerick McKinnon – 12 rushes, 61 yards

Top receivers

- PIT – Diontae Johnson – 5 receptions, 34 yards, TD
- KC – Jerick McKinnon – 6 receptions, 81 yards, TD

==== AFC Divisional Playoffs: vs. (3) Buffalo Bills ====
AFC Divisional Playoffs: (3) Buffalo Bills at (2) Kansas City Chiefs – Game summary

Quarter	1	2	3	4	OT	Total
Bills	7	7	7	15	0	36
Chiefs	7	7	9	13	6	42

at Arrowhead Stadium, Kansas City, Missouri

- Date: January 23, 2022
- Game time: 6:40 p.m. EST/5:40 p.m. CST
- Game weather: 37 °F (3 °C)
- Game attendance: 73,242
- Referee: John Hussey
- TV announcers (CBS): Jim Nantz, Tony Romo, Tracy Wolfson and Jay Feely
- Recap, Game Book

Game information

First quarter

- BUF – Devin Singletary 1-yard run (Tyler Bass kick), 8:03. Bills 7–0. Drive: 13 plays, 71 yards, 6:57.
- KC – Patrick Mahomes 8-yard run (Harrison Butker kick), 2:26. Tied 7–7. Drive: 11 plays, 74 yards, 5:37.

Second quarter

- KC – Byron Pringle 2-yard pass from Patrick Mahomes (Harrison Butker kick), 1:52. Chiefs 14–7. Drive: 12 plays, 86 yards, 6:51.
- BUF – Gabe Davis 18-yard pass from Josh Allen (Tyler Bass kick), 0:37. Tied 14–14. Drive: 7 plays, 75 yards, 1:15.

Third quarter

- KC – Harrison Butker 39-yard field goal, 7:01. Chiefs 17–14. Drive: 13 plays, 54 yards, 7:59.
- KC – Mecole Hardman 25-yard run (kick failed, hit left upright), 2:06. Chiefs 23–14. Drive: 5 plays, 61 yards, 2:43.
- BUF – Gabe Davis 75-yard pass from Josh Allen (Tyler Bass kick), 1:56. Chiefs 23–21. Drive: 1 play, 75 yards, 0:10.

Fourth quarter

- KC – Harrison Butker 28-yard field goal, 8:55. Chiefs 26–21. Drive: 4 plays, 6 yards, 2:33.
- BUF – Gabe Davis 27-yard pass from Josh Allen (Josh Allen–Stefon Diggs pass), 1:54. Bills 29–26. Drive: 17 plays, 75 yards, 7:01.
- KC – Tyreek Hill 64-yard pass from Patrick Mahomes (Harrison Butker kick), 1:02. Chiefs 33–29. Drive: 5 plays, 75 yards, 0:52.
- BUF – Gabe Davis 19-yard pass from Josh Allen (Tyler Bass kick), 0:13. Bills 36–33. Drive: 6 plays, 75 yards, 0:49.
- KC – Harrison Butker 49-yard field goal, 0:00. Tied 36–36. Drive: 3 plays, 44 yards, 0:13.

Overtime

- KC – Travis Kelce 8-yard pass from Patrick Mahomes, 10:45. Chiefs 42–36. Drive: 8 plays, 75 yards, 4:15.

Top passers

- BUF – Josh Allen – 27/37, 329 yards, 4 TD
- KC – Patrick Mahomes – 33/44, 378 yards, 3 TD

Top rushers

- BUF – Josh Allen – 11 rushes, 68 yards
- KC – Patrick Mahomes – 7 rushes, 69 yards, TD

Top receivers

- BUF – Gabe Davis – 8 receptions, 201 yards, 4 TD
- KC – Tyreek Hill – 11 receptions, 150 yards, TD

==== AFC Championship: vs. (4) Cincinnati Bengals ====
AFC Championship: (4) Cincinnati Bengals at (2) Kansas City Chiefs – Game summary

Quarter	1	2	3	4	OT	Total
Bengals	3	7	11	3	3	27
Chiefs	7	14	0	3	0	24

at Arrowhead Stadium, Kansas City, Missouri

- Date: January 30, 2022
- Game time: 3:05 p.m. EST/2:05 p.m. CST
- Game weather: Cloudy, 41 °F (5 °C)
- Game attendance: 73,377
- Referee: Bill Vinovich
- TV announcers (CBS): Jim Nantz, Tony Romo, Tracy Wolfson, Evan Washburn and Jay Feely
- Recap, Game Book

Game information

First quarter

- KC – Tyreek Hill 10-yard pass from Patrick Mahomes (Harrison Butker kick), 7:17. Chiefs 7–0. Drive: 11 plays, 84 yards, 6:09.
- CIN – Evan McPherson 32-yard field goal, 0:36. Chiefs 7–3. Drive: 14 plays, 61 yards, 6:41.

Second quarter

- KC – Travis Kelce 5-yard pass from Patrick Mahomes (Harrison Butker kick), 12:14. Chiefs 14–3. Drive: 7 plays, 75 yards, 3:22.
- KC – Mecole Hardman 3-yard pass from Patrick Mahomes (Harrison Butker kick), 5:04. Chiefs 21–3. Drive: 8 plays, 72 yards, 4:56.
- CIN – Samaje Perine 41-yard pass from Joe Burrow (Evan McPherson kick), 1:05. Chiefs 21–10. Drive: 7 plays, 70 yards, 3:59.

Third quarter

- CIN – Evan McPherson 31-yard field goal, 2:58. Chiefs 21–13. Drive: 11 plays, 52 yards, 5:42.
- CIN – Ja'Marr Chase 2-yard pass from Joe Burrow (Joe Burrow–Trent Taylor pass), 0:14. Tied 21–21. Drive: 5 plays, 27 yards, 2:04.

Fourth quarter

- CIN – Evan McPherson 52-yard field goal, 6:04. Bengals 24–21. Drive: 11 plays, 46 yards, 6:23.
- KC – Harrison Butker 44-yard field goal, 0:00. Tied 24–24. Drive: 14 plays, 49 yards, 6:04.

Overtime

- CIN – Evan McPherson 31-yard field goal, 9:22. Bengals 27–24. Drive: 9 plays, 42 yards, 5:24.

Top passers

- CIN – Joe Burrow – 23/38, 250 yards, 2 TD, INT
- KC – Patrick Mahomes – 26/39, 275 yards, 3 TD, 2 INT

Top rushers

- CIN – Joe Mixon – 21 rushes, 88 yards
- KC – Jerick McKinnon – 12 rushes, 65 yards

Top receivers

- CIN – Tee Higgins – 6 receptions, 103 yards
- KC – Travis Kelce – 10 receptions, 95 yards, TD

== Statistics ==
=== Team ===
Category	Total yards	Yards per game	NFL rank (out of 32)
Passing offense	4,791	281.8	4th
Rushing offense	1,955	115.0	16th
Total offense	6,746	396.8	3rd
Passing defense	4,273	251.4	27th
Rushing defense	1,999	117.6	21st
Total defense	6,272	368.9	27th

=== Individual ===
Category	Player	Total yards
Offense
Passing	Patrick Mahomes	4,839
Rushing	Darrel Williams	558
Receiving	Tyreek Hill	1,239
Defense
Tackles (Solo)	Nick Bolton	70
Sacks	Chris Jones	9
Interceptions	Tyrann Mathieu	3

Statistics correct as of the end of the 2021 NFL season
