= Nick Bolton =

American football player (born 2000)

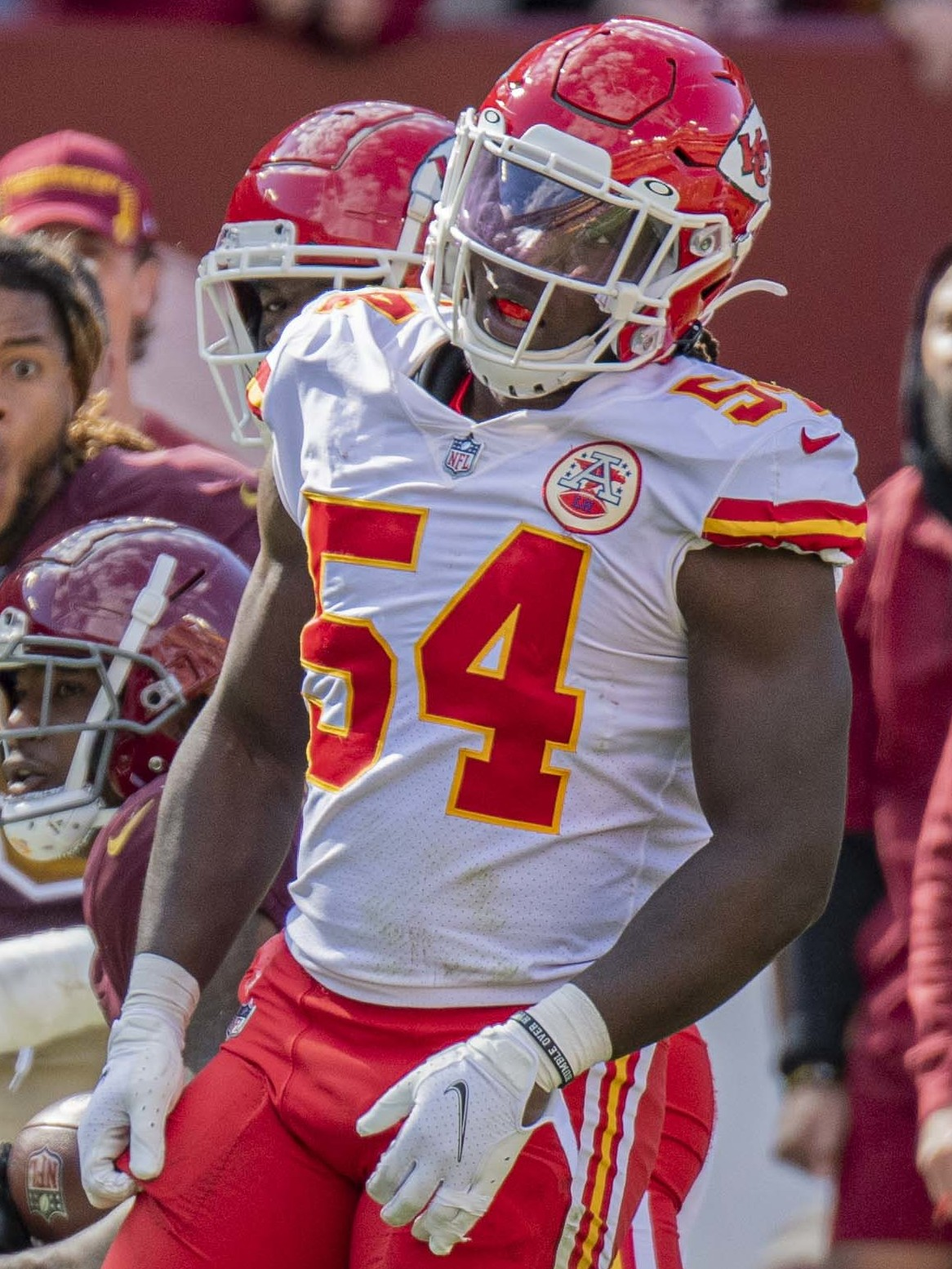
- Bolton with the Kansas City Chiefs in 2021

No. 32 – Kansas City Chiefs
- Position: Linebacker
- Roster status: Active

Personal information
- Born: March 10, 2000 (age 26); Frisco, Texas, U.S.
- Listed height: 5 ft 11 in (1.80 m)
- Listed weight: 237 lb (108 kg)

Career information
- High school: Lone Star (Frisco)
- College: Missouri (2018–2020)
- NFL draft: 2021: 2nd round, 58th overall pick

Career history
- Kansas City Chiefs (2021–present)

Awards and highlights
- 2× Super Bowl champion (LVII, LVIII); PFWA All-Rookie Team (2021); Second-team All-American (2020); 2× First-team All-SEC (2019, 2020)

Career NFL statistics as of Week 10, 2026
- Total tackles: 701
- Sacks: 6.0
- Forced fumbles: 5
- Fumble recoveries: 3
- Interceptions: 5
- Pass deflections: 23
- Defensive touchdowns: 1
- Stats at Pro Football Reference

Nicholas Bolton (born March 10, 2000) is an American professional football linebacker for the Kansas City Chiefs of the National Football League (NFL). He played college football for the Missouri Tigers, and was selected by the Chiefs in the second round of the 2021 NFL draft. Bolton has won two Super Bowl titles, LVII and LVIII, having been a starter in the 2022 and 2023 Chiefs teams. He also scored a defensive touchdown from a fumble recovery in the first win.

== Early life ==
Bolton attended Lone Star High School in Frisco, Texas. He had 130 tackles and five interceptions as a senior and 111 tackles and one interception his junior season. He committed to the University of Missouri to play college football.

== College career ==
As a true freshman at Missouri in 2018, he played in all 13 games recording 22 tackles and one sack. As a sophomore in 2019, he became a starter. He had two interceptions, including one for a touchdown, in a game against West Virginia in the 2019 season. He was named first-team All-Southeastern Conference (SEC) after finishing with 103 tackles, two interceptions and one sack. During a COVID-19 scheduled ten game season in 2020, Bolton finished with 95 tackles and two sacks to close out his junior year. He was once again named first-team All-SEC. In addition, he received Associated Press Second-team All-American honors.

In 2026, Bolton was elected to Missouri's Intercollegiate Athletics Hall of Fame.

== Professional career ==
Pre-draft measurables
| Height | Weight | Arm length | Hand span | Wingspan | 40-yard dash | 10-yard split | 20-yard split | 20-yard shuttle | Three-cone drill | Vertical jump | Broad jump | Bench press |
|---|---|---|---|---|---|---|---|---|---|---|---|---|
| 5 ft 11 1/8 in (1.81 m) | 237 lb (108 kg) | 31 7/8 in (0.81 m) | 10 3/8 in (0.26 m) | 6 ft 4 1/4 in (1.94 m) | 4.60 s | 1.71 s | 2.62 s | 4.50 s | 7.40 s | 32.0 in (0.81 m) | 9 ft 7 in (2.92 m) | 24 reps |
All values from Pro Day

Bolton was selected by the Kansas City Chiefs in the second round (58th overall) of the 2021 NFL draft. The Chiefs used a 2nd round selection they previously acquired along with Orlando Brown Jr. in a trade that sent the 31st overall pick in the 2021 NFL draft (Odafe Oweh) to the Baltimore Ravens. On May 13, 2021, Bolton officially signed with the Chiefs on a $5.84 million deal. Bolton was put on the Reserve/COVID-19 list on December 21. He was activated on December 25. In Week 18, against the Denver Broncos, he recorded his first NFL touchdown on an 86-yard fumble return in the 28–24 victory. As a rookie, he appeared in 16 games and started 12. He finished with 112 total tackles and three passes defended. He was named to the 2021 PFWA All-Rookie Team.

During the 2022 season, Bolton recorded two sacks, 180 total tackles (108 solo), two interceptions, three passes defended, and one forced fumble. He finished second in the NFL in combined and solo tackles in the 2022 season, helping the Chiefs reach Super Bowl LVII.

Bolton then played a key role in their 38–35 victory over the Philadelphia Eagles, leading both teams with nine total tackles, and returning a fumble by Jalen Hurts 36 yards for a touchdown.

During the 2023 season, Bolton recorded 60 total tackles, one interception, and three passes defended. The Chiefs reached Super Bowl LVIII where they defeated the San Francisco 49ers, 25–22, to repeat as Super Bowl champions. Bolton led both teams with 13 total tackles.

During Week 13 of the 2024 season against the Las Vegas Raiders, Bolton recorded 11 tackles and recovered a fumble from Raiders quarterback Aidan O'Connell with 14 seconds left in the game. This would, in essence, end the game and send the Chiefs to the playoffs, marking their 10th straight appearance in the postseason. He finished the 2024 season with three sacks, 106 total tackles (73 solo), one interception, six passes defended, one forced fumble, and two fumble recoveries. However, in Super Bowl LIX, a rematch of Super Bowl LVII, the Chiefs lost to the Eagles, 40–22, erasing their hopes of becoming the first NFL team to win three consecutive Super Bowls. Bolton recorded nine tackles in the game, as he did the first time he took on the Eagles in the Super Bowl.

On March 14, 2025, Bolton re-signed with the Chiefs on a three-year, $45 million contract. He finished the 2025 season with one sack, 154 total tackles (73 solo), one interception, and six passes defended.

== Career statistics ==
=== NFL ===
Legend
| | Won the Super Bowl |
| | Led the league |
| **Bold** | Career high |

==== Regular season ====
| Year | Team | Games | | Tackles | | | | | | Interceptions | | | | | | Fumbles | | | |
| Year | Team | GP | GS | Comb | Solo | Ast | Sck | TFL | Sfty | PD | Int | Yds | Avg | Lng | TD | FF | FR | Yds | TD |
|---|---|---|---|---|---|---|---|---|---|---|---|---|---|---|---|---|---|---|---|
| 2021 | KC | 16 | 12 | 112 | 70 | 42 | 0.0 | **11** | 0 | 3 | 0 | 0 | 0.0 | 0 | 0 | 0 | 1 | **86** | **1** |
| 2022 | KC | 17 | 17 | **180** | **108** | 72 | 2.0 | 9 | 0 | 3 | **2** | **15** | **7.5** | **15** | 0 | 1 | 0 | 0 | 0 |
| 2023 | KC | 8 | 8 | 60 | 38 | 22 | 0.0 | 1 | 0 | 3 | 1 | 1 | 1.0 | 1 | 0 | 0 | 0 | 0 | 0 |
| 2024 | KC | 16 | 16 | 106 | 73 | 33 | **3.0** | **11** | 0 | **6** | 1 | 0 | 0.0 | 0 | 0 | 1 | **2** | 0 | 0 |
| 2025 | KC | 17 | 17 | 154 | 73 | **81** | 1.0 | 10 | 0 | **6** | 1 | 0 | 0.0 | 0 | 0 | 1 | 0 | 0 | 0 |
| 2026 | KC | 9 | 9 | 89 | 44 | 45 | 0.0 | 5 | 0 | 2 | 0 | 0 | 0.0 | 0 | 0 | **2** | 0 | 0 | 0 |
| Career | | 83 | 79 | 701 | 406 | 295 | 6.0 | 47 | 0 | 23 | 5 | 16 | 3.2 | 15 | 0 | 5 | 3 | 86 | 1 |

==== Postseason ====
| Year | Team | Games | | Tackles | | | | | | Interceptions | | | | | | Fumbles | | | |
| Year | Team | GP | GS | Comb | Solo | Ast | Sck | TFL | Sfty | PD | Int | Yds | Avg | Lng | TD | FF | FR | Yds | TD |
|---|---|---|---|---|---|---|---|---|---|---|---|---|---|---|---|---|---|---|---|
| 2021 | KC | 3 | 2 | 19 | 11 | 8 | 0.0 | 1 | 0 | 0 | 0 | 0 | 0.0 | 0 | 0 | 0 | 0 | 0 | 0 |
| 2022 | KC | 3 | 3 | 23 | 15 | 8 | 0.0 | 0 | 0 | 0 | 0 | 0 | 0.0 | 0 | 0 | 0 | **2** | **36** | **1** |
| 2023 | KC | 4 | 4 | **40** | **18** | **22** | 0.0 | **2** | 0 | **1** | 0 | 0 | 0.0 | 0 | 0 | 0 | 0 | 0 | 0 |
| 2024 | KC | 3 | 3 | 20 | 11 | 9 | 0.0 | **2** | 0 | **1** | 0 | 0 | 0.0 | 0 | 0 | 0 | 0 | 0 | 0 |
| Career | | 13 | 12 | 102 | 55 | 47 | 0.0 | 5 | 0 | 2 | 0 | 0 | 0.0 | 0 | 0 | 0 | 2 | 36 | 1 |

=== College ===
| Season | Team | GP | Tackles | | | | | | | Interceptions | | | | Fumbles | |
| Season | Team | GP | Solo | Ast | Cmb | TfL | Yds | Sck | Yds | Int | Yds | TD | PD | FR | FF |
|---|---|---|---|---|---|---|---|---|---|---|---|---|---|---|---|
| 2018 | Missouri | 13 | 12 | 10 | 22 | 1 | 3 | 1.0 | 3 | 0 | 0 | 0 | 0 | 0 | 0 |
| 2019 | Missouri | 12 | 74 | 29 | 103 | 8.5 | 23 | 1.0 | 9 | 2 | 38 | 1 | 10 | 0 | 0 |
| 2020 | Missouri | 10 | 53 | 42 | 95 | 8.0 | 18 | 2.0 | 6 | 0 | 0 | 0 | 5 | 0 | 1 |
| Career | | 35 | 139 | 81 | 220 | 17.5 | 44 | 4.0 | 18 | 2 | 38 | 1 | 15 | 0 | 1 |

== Personal life ==
Bolton is a Christian.
