= Willie Gay =

American football player (born 1998)

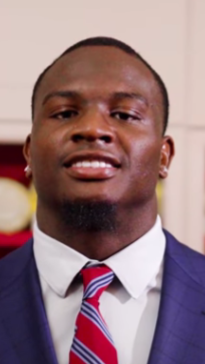
- Gay in 2023

No. 40 – Miami Dolphins
- Position: Linebacker
- Roster status: Active

Personal information
- Born: February 15, 1998 (age 28); Starkville, Mississippi, U.S.
- Listed height: 6 ft 1 in (1.85 m)
- Listed weight: 246 lb (112 kg)

Career information
- High school: Starkville
- College: Mississippi State (2017–2019)
- NFL draft: 2020: 2nd round, 63rd overall pick

Career history
- Kansas City Chiefs (2020–2023); New Orleans Saints (2024); Miami Dolphins (2025–present)

Awards and highlights
- 2× Super Bowl champion (LVII, LVIII)

Career NFL statistics as of 2025
- Total tackles: 281
- Sacks: 9.0
- Forced fumbles: 3
- Fumble recoveries: 6
- Interceptions: 4
- Pass deflections: 24
- Defensive touchdowns: 1
- Stats at Pro Football Reference

Willie Gay Jr. (born February 15, 1998) is an American professional football linebacker for the Miami Dolphins of the National Football League (NFL). He played college football for the Mississippi State Bulldogs. He was selected by the Kansas City Chiefs with the 63rd overall selection in the 2020 NFL draft.

== Early life ==
Gay attended Starkville High School in Starkville, Mississippi. At Starkville High School, he won the 2015 6A State Championship. He played in the 2017 U.S. Army All-American Bowl. A four-star recruit, Gay committed to Mississippi State University to play college football.

== College career ==
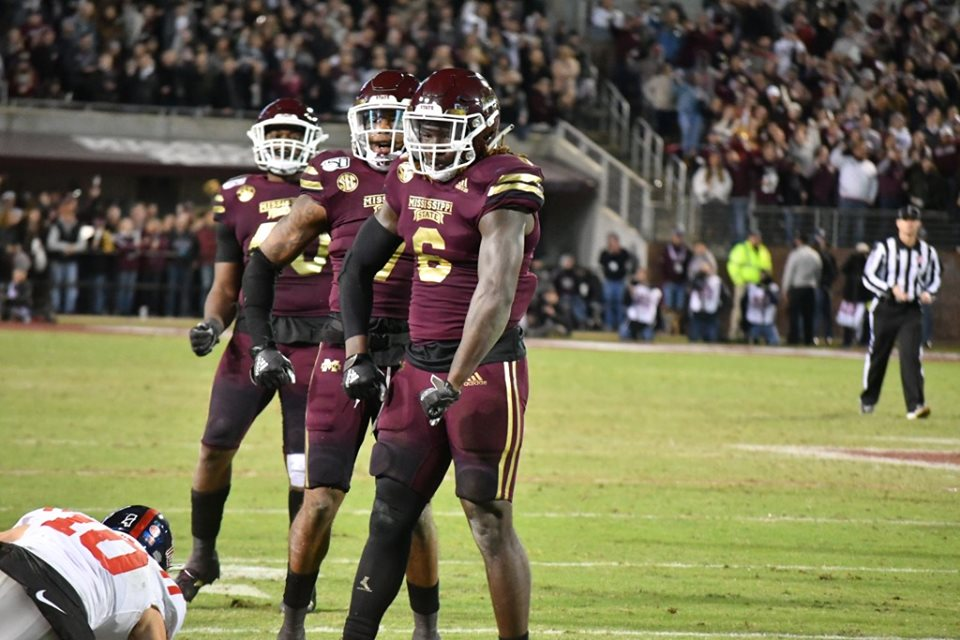
Gay in 2019

Gay played at Mississippi State from 2017 to 2019. As a junior in 2019, he played in only five games and missed eight due to suspension. After the season, he entered the 2020 NFL draft, forgoing his senior season. During his career, he played in 31 games, starting six, recording 99 tackles, six sacks, three interceptions and a touchdown.

== Professional career ==
Pre-draft measurables
Height	Weight	Arm length	Hand span	Wingspan	40-yard dash	10-yard split	20-yard split	20-yard shuttle	Three-cone drill	Vertical jump	Broad jump	Bench press
6 ft 1 1/8 in (1.86 m)	243 lb (110 kg)	32 5/8 in (0.83 m)	10 1/2 in (0.27 m)	6 ft 5 7/8 in (1.98 m)	4.46 s	1.50 s	2.60 s	4.30 s	7.08 s	39.5 in (1.00 m)	11 ft 4 in (3.45 m)	21 reps
All values from NFL Combine

=== Kansas City Chiefs ===
Gay was selected by the Kansas City Chiefs in the second round with the 63rd overall pick in the 2020 NFL draft, which was previously acquired by the Chiefs in a 2019 trade that sent Dee Ford to the San Francisco 49ers. In Week 5 against the Las Vegas Raiders, Gay recorded his first career sack. On February 6, 2021, Gay was placed on injured reserve, forcing him to miss Super Bowl LV. Without Gay, the Chiefs lost the Super Bowl 31-9 to the Tampa Bay Buccaneers.

Gay was placed on injured reserve on September 2, 2021. He was activated on October 9.

On September 19, 2022, Gay was suspended for four games for violating the NFL's personal conduct policy due to his arrest in January 2022. Gay went on to help the Chiefs win Super Bowl LVII against the Philadelphia Eagles 38–35. Gay recorded eight tackles in the Super Bowl.

In 2023, Gay had 58 tackles, one sack, one forced fumble, three fumble recoveries, one interception, and four passes defended. Gay helped the Chiefs reach Super Bowl LVIII where they defeated the San Francisco 49ers 25-22 to win their second straight championship. Gay recorded 4 tackles in the game.

=== New Orleans Saints ===
On March 13, 2024, Gay signed a one-year contract with the New Orleans Saints.

=== Miami Dolphins ===
On March 19, 2025, Gay signed a one-year contract with the Miami Dolphins.

On March 12, 2026, Gay re-signed with the Dolphins on a new one-year contract.

== NFL career statistics ==
Legend
	Won the Super Bowl
	Led the league
**Bold**	Career high

=== Regular season ===
Year	Team	Games		Tackles					Interceptions						Fumbles			
Year	Team	GP	GS	Comb	Solo	Ast	Sck	TFL	PD	Int	Yds	Avg	Lng	TD	FF	FR	Yds	TD
2020	KC	16	8	39	29	10	1.0	3	3	0	0	0.0	0	0	**1**	0	0	0
2021	KC	12	11	48	26	22	0.5	1	4	**2**	14	7.0	13	0	0	0	0	0
2022	KC	13	13	**88**	**51**	**37**	**2.5**	**9**	**8**	1	**47**	**47.0**	**47**	**1**	0	1	0	0
2023	KC	16	15	58	44	14	1.0	4	4	1	24	24.0	24	0	**1**	**3**	1	0
2024	NO	15	8	28	19	9	2.0	2	3	0	0	–	–	0	**1**	2	**4**	0
2025	MIA	17	2	20	10	10	2.0	3	2	0	0	–	–	0	0	0	0	0
Career		89	57	281	179	102	9.0	22	24	4	85	21.3	47	1	3	6	5	0

=== Playoffs ===
Year	Team	Games		Tackles					Interceptions						Fumbles			
Year	Team	GP	GS	Comb	Solo	Ast	Sck	TFL	PD	Int	Yds	Avg	Lng	TD	FF	FR	Yds	TD
2020	KC	DNP																
2021	KC	3	3	**11**	**7**	**4**	0.0	1	**2**	0	0	0.0	0	0	**1**	0	0	0
2022	KC	3	3	9	6	3	**0.5**	**2**	0	0	0	0.0	0	0	0	0	0	0
2023	KC	3	3	9	5	**4**	0.0	1	1	0	0	0.0	0	0	0	0	0	0
Career		9	9	29	18	11	0.5	4	3	0	0	0.0	0	0	1	0	0	0

== Legal trouble ==
Gay was arrested on January 19, 2022, for misdemeanor criminal destruction of property less than $1,000. He reportedly went to see his son at his son's mother's house. The two got into an argument and Gay damaged a vacuum cleaner, a humidifier, and a cellphone screen protector, as well as a wall and door.
