= Daurice Fountain =

American football player (born 1995)

No. 10, 82
- Position: Wide receiver

Personal information
- Born: December 22, 1995 (age 30); Madison, Wisconsin, U.S.
- Listed height: 6 ft 2 in (1.88 m)
- Listed weight: 210 lb (95 kg)

Career information
- High school: James Madison Memorial (Madison, Wisconsin)
- College: Northern Iowa
- NFL draft: 2018: 5th round, 159th overall pick

Career history
- Indianapolis Colts (2018–2020); Kansas City Chiefs (2021–2022); Chicago Bears (2022)*; Detroit Lions (2023)*
- * Offseason or practice squad member only

Awards and highlights
- First-team All-MVFC (2017)

Career NFL statistics as of 2023
- Receptions: 2
- Receiving yards: 23
- Stats at Pro Football Reference

Daurice Fountain (born December 22, 1995) is an American professional former football wide receiver. He played college football at Northern Iowa.

== College career ==
In 2017, Fountain had 943 receiving yards and 12 touchdowns. He was invited to the East-West Shrine Game and was named offensive MVP. Nevertheless, he was not invited to the NFL Scouting Combine.

== Professional career ==
Pre-draft measurables
Height	Weight	Arm length	Hand span	40-yard dash	10-yard split	20-yard split	20-yard shuttle	Three-cone drill	Vertical jump	Broad jump	Bench press
6 ft 1 5/8 in (1.87 m)	210 lb (95 kg)	34 in (0.86 m)	10 1/8 in (0.26 m)	4.57 s	1.65 s	2.60 s	4.29 s	7.02 s	42.5 in (1.08 m)	11 ft 2 in (3.40 m)	14 reps
All values from Pro Day

=== Indianapolis Colts ===
Fountain was drafted by the Indianapolis Colts in the fifth round, 159th overall, of the 2018 NFL draft. He was waived on September 1, 2018, and was signed to the practice squad the next day. On December 7, Fountain was promoted to the active roster.

On August 19, 2019, Fountain was placed on injured reserve after undergoing ankle surgery.

Fountain signed a one-year exclusive-rights free agent tender with the team on March 31, 2020. He was waived on September 5, 2020, and signed to the practice squad the next day. He was promoted to the active roster on September 16, 2020. He recorded his first career reception in the Colts week 3 game against the New York Jets. The reception would be a 12-yard reception. He was waived on October 31, 2020, and re-signed to the practice squad three days later. He was elevated to the active roster on November 7 for the team's week 9 game against the Baltimore Ravens, and reverted to the practice squad after the game. His practice squad contract with the team expired after the season on January 18, 2021.

=== Kansas City Chiefs ===
Fountain signed with the Kansas City Chiefs on May 17, 2021. He was released on October 12, 2021. He signed to the practice squad on October 14, 2021. He signed a reserve/future contract with the Chiefs on February 2, 2022.

On August 30, 2022, Fountain was waived by the Chiefs and signed to the practice squad the next day. He was elevated to the active roster on September 10, 2022, via a standard elevation which caused him to revert back to the practice squad after the game. He was released on October 24, 2022.

=== Chicago Bears ===
On October 26, 2022, the Chicago Bears signed Fountain to their practice squad. He signed a reserve/future contract on January 10, 2023. He was released on August 29, 2023.

=== Detroit Lions ===
On August 31, 2023, Fountain was signed to the Detroit Lions practice squad. He signed a reserve/future contract on January 31, 2024. He was released on August 27, 2024.

== NFL career statistics ==
Season	Team	Games		Receiving						Rushing					Fumbles	
Season	Team	GP	GS	Tgt	Rec	Yds	Avg	Lng	TD	Att	Yds	Avg	Lng	TD	Fum	Lost
2018	IND	1	0	0	0	0	0	0	0	0	0	0	0	0	0	0
2019	IND	Did not play due to injury														
2020	IND	5	0	3	2	23	11.5	12	0	0	0	0	0	0	0	0
2021	KC	2	0	0	0	0	0	0	0	0	0	0	0	0	0	0
Career		8	0	3	2	23	11.5	12	0	0	0	0	0	0	0	0
