= Zayne Anderson =

American football player (born 1997)

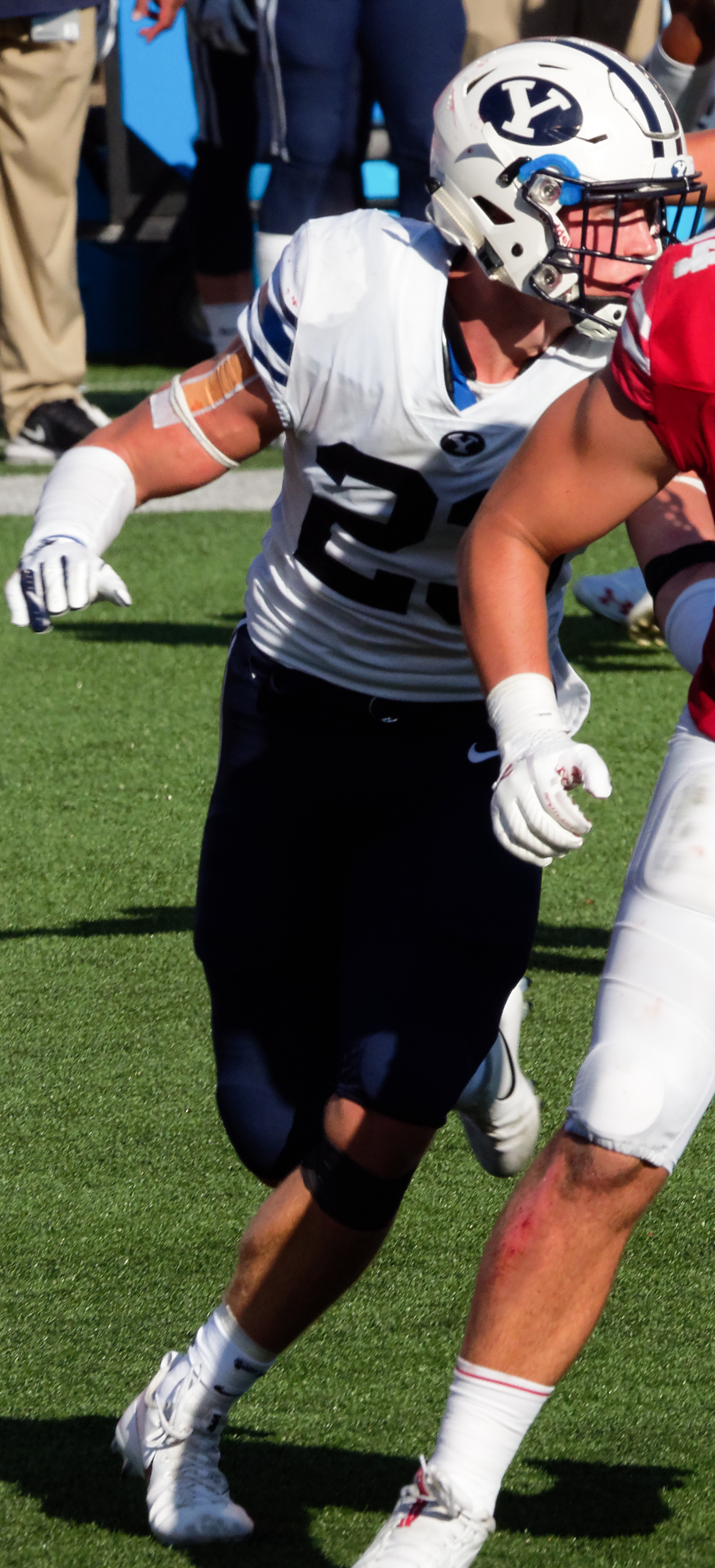
- Anderson in college at BYU in 2018

No. 23 – Miami Dolphins
- Position: Safety
- Roster status: Active

Personal information
- Born: January 3, 1997 (age 29); Stansbury Park, Utah, U.S.
- Listed height: 6 ft 2 in (1.88 m)
- Listed weight: 206 lb (93 kg)

Career information
- High school: Stansbury
- College: BYU (2015–2020)
- NFL draft: 2021: undrafted

Career history
- Kansas City Chiefs (2021–2022); Buffalo Bills (2023)*; Green Bay Packers (2023–2025); Miami Dolphins (2026–present)
- * Offseason or practice squad member only

Awards and highlights
- Super Bowl champion (LVII)

Career NFL statistics as of 2025
- Total tackles: 36
- Fumble recoveries: 2
- Pass deflections: 2
- Interceptions: 1
- Stats at Pro Football Reference

Zayne Anderson (born January 3, 1997) is an American professional football safety for the Miami Dolphins of the National Football League (NFL). He played college football for the BYU Cougars.

== College career ==
Anderson played in 50 games at BYU despite redshirting with injuries for 2 seasons, compiling 162 career tackles (105 solo). Anderson has size and speed to play and played a number of positions and has been compared to former BYU star and Kansas City Chief Daniel Sorensen.

== Professional career ==
Pre-draft measurables
Height	Weight	Arm length	Hand span	Wingspan	40-yard dash	10-yard split	20-yard split	20-yard shuttle	Three-cone drill	Vertical jump	Broad jump	Bench press
6 ft 1 7/8 in (1.88 m)	206 lb (93 kg)	31 1/4 in (0.79 m)	9 3/4 in (0.25 m)	6 ft 4 in (1.93 m)	4.44 s	1.60 s	2.60 s	4.20 s	6.78 s	34.0 in (0.86 m)	10 ft 0 in (3.05 m)	11 reps
All values from Pro Day

=== Kansas City Chiefs ===
Anderson was signed as an undrafted free agent by the Kansas City Chiefs after going unselected in the 2021 NFL draft. After being released with final cuts on August 31, 2021, Anderson was signed to the team's practice squad. Anderson was promoted to the active roster on December 14, 2021.

On August 30, 2022, Anderson was waived by the Chiefs and signed to the practice squad the next day. Anderson became a Super Bowl champion when the Chiefs defeated the Philadelphia Eagles in Super Bowl LVII.

=== Buffalo Bills ===
On February 17, 2023, Anderson signed a two-year contract with the Buffalo Bills. He was waived by the Bills on August 29.

=== Green Bay Packers ===
On August 31, 2023, Anderson was claimed off of waivers by the Green Bay Packers. In 10 appearances for the team, he recorded four combined tackles.

On December 23, 2024, Anderson recorded his first career interception against the New Orleans Saints, intercepting a ball thrown by Spencer Rattler. In 16 appearances (two starts) for the Packers, he compiled 16 combined tackles, one interception, and two pass deflections.

Anderson made 14 appearances for Green Bay in 2025, recording two fumble recoveries and 15 combined tackles. On December 31, 2025, the Packers placed him on season-ending injured reserve due to an ankle injury suffered in Week 17 against the Baltimore Ravens.

=== Miami Dolphins ===
Anderson signed with the Miami Dolphins on March 13, 2026. Anderson reunited with Jeff Hafley who was Packers Defensive coordinator back then.

== NFL career statistics ==
Legend
**Bold**	Career high

=== Regular season ===
Year	Team	Games		Tackles					Interceptions						Fumbles	
Year	Team	GP	GS	Cmb	Solo	Ast	Sck	Sfty	PD	Int	Yds	Avg	Lng	TD	FF	FR
2021	KC	4	0	1	1	0	0.0	0	0	0	0	0.0	0	0	0	0
2022	KC	3	0	0	0	0	0.0	0	0	0	0	0.0	0	0	0	0
2023	GB	10	0	4	3	1	0.0	0	0	0	0	0.0	0	0	0	0
2024	GB	**16**	**2**	**16**	**13**	3	0.0	0	**2**	**1**	**18**	**18.0**	**18**	0	0	0
2025	GB	14	0	15	5	**10**	0.0	0	0	0	0	0	0	0	0	**2**
Career		47	2	36	22	14	0.0	0	2	1	18	18.0	18	0	0	2
Source: pro-football-reference.com

=== Postseason ===
Year	Team	Games		Tackles				Interceptions						Fumbles	
Year	Team	GP	GS	Cmb	Solo	Ast	Sck	PD	Int	Yds	Avg	Lng	TDs	FF	FR
2021	KC	**3**	0	1	1	0	0.0	0	0	0	0.0	0	0	0	0
2023	GB	2	0	**2**	**2**	0	0.0	0	0	0	0.0	0	0	0	0
Career		5	0	3	3	0	0.0	0	0	0	0.0	0	0	0	0
Source: pro-football-reference.com

== Personal life ==
Anderson is a member of the Church of Jesus Christ of Latter-day Saints.
