= Derrick Gore =

American football player (born 1994)

Profile
- Position: Running back

Personal information
- Born: December 13, 1994 (age 31); Syracuse, New York, U.S.
- Listed height: 5 ft 10 in (1.78 m)
- Listed weight: 212 lb (96 kg)

Career information
- High school: Syracuse (NY) Nottingham
- College: Alabama (2015–2016); Louisiana–Monroe (2017–2018)
- NFL draft: 2019: undrafted

Career history
- Los Angeles Chargers (2019)*; Washington Redskins (2019)*; Los Angeles Chargers (2020)*; Kansas City Chiefs (2021); New Orleans Saints (2022–2023)*; Washington Commanders (2023)
- * Offseason or practice squad member only

Awards and highlights
- CFP national champion (2015)

Career NFL statistics
- Rushing yards: 282
- Rushing average: 5.2
- Rushing touchdowns: 2
- Receptions: 8
- Receiving yards: 105
- Stats at Pro Football Reference

Derrick Gore (born December 13, 1994) is an American professional football running back. He played college football for the Alabama Crimson Tide and Louisiana–Monroe Warhawks.

== College career ==
Gore began his collegiate career at Coffeyville Community College. He suffered an injury in training camp and missed his freshman season. Following the season, Gore transferred to Alabama after receiving an offer to join the team as a walk-on. He played mostly on special teams as a redshirt freshman as the Crimson tide won the 2015 National Championship As a redshirt sophomore, Gore rushed for 93 yards and one touchdown. After the season Gore announced his intent to transfer from Alabama and ultimately committed to transfer to Louisiana–Monroe for his final two seasons of NCAA eligibility. He led the Warhawks in rushing in both seasons with 585 and 662 yards scored 13 total touchdowns.

== Professional career ==
Pre-draft measurables
Height	Weight	Arm length	Hand span	40-yard dash	10-yard split	20-yard split	20-yard shuttle	Three-cone drill	Vertical jump	Broad jump	Bench press
5 ft 9 1/8 in (1.76 m)	206 lb (93 kg)	31 1/8 in (0.79 m)	9 3/4 in (0.25 m)	4.63 s	1.64 s	2.61 s	4.32 s	7.14 s	34.0 in (0.86 m)	9 ft 6 in (2.90 m)	23 reps
All values from Pro Day

=== Los Angeles Chargers (first stint) ===
Gore was signed by the Los Angeles Chargers as an undrafted free agent on July 24, 2019. Gore was released by the team on August 31, 2019, during final roster cuts. Gore was re-signed to the Chargers' practice squad on October 16, 2019, but was waived two days later.

=== Washington Redskins (first stint) ===
Gore was signed to the Washington Redskins practice squad on December 10, 2019.

=== Los Angeles Chargers (second stint) ===
Gore was re-signed by the Chargers on May 5, 2020. He was waived at the end of training camp on September 5, 2020. He was re-signed to the Chargers' practice squad on November 16, 2020. The Chargers released Gore on December 4, 2020.

=== Kansas City Chiefs ===
Gore signed a reserve/futures contract with the Kansas City Chiefs on February 6, 2021. He was waived by the Chiefs during final roster cuts on August 30, 2021, and was re-signed to their practice squad on September 1 Gore was signed to the Chiefs active roster on October 12, 2021. He rushed for his first NFL touchdown against the New York Giants in 2021.

On August 23, 2022, Gore was placed on injured reserve with a fractured thumb. He was released on August 25.

=== New Orleans Saints ===
On November 9, 2022, Gore was signed to the New Orleans Saints practice squad. He signed a reserve/future contract on January 9, 2023. He was waived on May 2, 2023.

=== Washington Commanders (second stint) ===
On July 31, 2023, Gore signed with the Washington Commanders. He was waived on August 29, 2023, and re-signed to the practice squad. He was signed to the active roster on December 22.
