= Sean Culkin =

American football player (born 1993)

No. 80, 84
- Position: Tight end

Personal information
- Born: June 11, 1993 (age 33); Indian Rocks Beach, Florida, U.S.
- Listed height: 6 ft 5 in (1.96 m)
- Listed weight: 255 lb (116 kg)

Career information
- High school: Indian Rocks Christian (Largo, Florida)
- College: Missouri (2012–2016)
- NFL draft: 2017: undrafted

Career history
- Los Angeles Chargers (2017–2019); Baltimore Ravens (2020); Kansas City Chiefs (2021)*
- * Offseason or practice squad member only

Career NFL statistics
- Receptions: 2
- Receiving yards: 36
- Stats at Pro Football Reference

Sean Culkin (born June 11, 1993) is an American former professional football player who was a tight end in the National Football League (NFL) for the Los Angeles Chargers and Baltimore Ravens. He played college football for the Missouri Tigers.

== Early life and education ==
Culkin played high school football at Indian Rocks Christian School in Largo, Florida. He caught 28 passes for 547 yards and 8 touchdowns his junior season, earning All-County honors. He caught 55 passes for 981 yards and 18 touchdowns his senior year, garnering U.S. Air Force First Team All-American, First Team All-State and team MVP recognition. Culkin also played several years of AAU basketball.

He graduated from University of Missouri in May 2016 with a Bachelor's Degree in Finance. In 2020, Culkin was accepted into the Kelley School of Business, where he enrolled in Indiana University's Master of Business Administration program.

== College career ==
Culkin played for the Missouri Tigers of the University of Missouri from 2013 to 2016. He was redshirted in 2012. He played in 14 games in 2013, catching 1 pass for 6 yards and recording 1 solo tackle. Culkin was also named to the SEC Fall Academic Honor Roll.

He played in 14 games, in 2014, catching 20 passes for 174 yards and 1 touchdown. He played in 10 games, in 2015, catching 16 passes for 139 yards and 1 touchdown. Culkin also recorded one solo tackle. He was named to the SEC Fall Academic Honor Roll in 2015. He played in 10 games in 2016, catching 24 passes for 282 yards.

Culkin was named to the SEC Fall Academic Honor Roll in 2016. He played in 48 games during his college career, catching 61 passes for 601 yards and 2 touchdowns. He also recorded 2 solo tackles.

In January 2017, Culkin played in the Tropical Bowl, a college football all-star game.

== Professional career ==
Culkin was rated the 39th best tight end in the 2017 NFL draft by NFLDraftScout.com.

Pre-draft measurables
Height	Weight	40-yard dash	10-yard split	20-yard split	20-yard shuttle	Three-cone drill	Vertical jump	Broad jump	Bench press
6 ft 5 in (1.96 m)	251 lb (114 kg)	4.71 s	1.64 s	2.82 s	4.46 s	7.20 s	35 1/2 in (0.90 m)	10 ft 0 in (3.05 m)	21 reps
All values from Missouri Pro Day

=== Los Angeles Chargers ===
Culkin signed with the Los Angeles Chargers as an undrafted free agent on May 12, 2017.

Culkin was primarily utilized as a blocking tight end and special teams contributor. In his second season with the team, Culkin saw an increase in snaps and 10 starts in the 13 games he played.

In Week 4 of the 2019 season, Culkin suffered a torn Achilles and was ruled out for the season.

=== Baltimore Ravens ===
On September 22, 2020, Culkin was signed to the Baltimore Ravens practice squad. He was elevated to the active roster on December 2 for the team's week 12 game against the Pittsburgh Steelers, and reverted to the practice squad after the game. He was placed on the practice squad/injured list on December 4, and restored to the practice squad on January 5, 2021. His practice squad contract with the team expired after the season on January 25, 2021.

=== Kansas City Chiefs ===
On February 5, 2021, Culkin signed a reserve/future contract with the Kansas City Chiefs. On April 26, 2021, he became the first NFL player to convert his entire salary to bitcoin. He was released on May 10, 2021.
