= Austin Edwards =

American football player (born 1997)

No. 90
- Position: Defensive end

Personal information
- Born: August 27, 1997 (age 29); Lansing, Michigan, U.S.
- Listed height: 6 ft 5 in (1.96 m)
- Listed weight: 273 lb (124 kg)

Career information
- High school: Waverly Senior (Lansing, Michigan)
- College: Ferris State (2015–2019)
- NFL draft: 2020: undrafted

Career history
- Atlanta Falcons (2020)*; Kansas City Chiefs (2021)*; Houston Roughnecks (2023); San Antonio Brahmas (2024)*
- * Offseason or practice squad member only
- Stats at Pro Football Reference

Austin Edwards (born August 27, 1997) is an American former professional football defensive end. He was signed by the Atlanta Falcons as an undrafted free agent in 2020 following his college football career with the Ferris State Bulldogs, where he was a first-team All-American selection and won the Gene Upshaw Award for Best D2 Defensive Lineman of The Year of 2019. He played in the 2019 East–West Shrine Game.

== Professional career ==
Pre-draft measurables
Height	Weight	Arm length	Hand span
6 ft 3 in (1.91 m)	265 lb (120 kg)	33 1/8 in (0.84 m)	9 3/4 in (0.25 m)
All values from Pro Day

=== Atlanta Falcons ===
Edwards signed with the Atlanta Falcons as an undrafted free agent following the 2020 NFL draft on April 27, 2020. He was waived during final roster cuts on September 5, and signed to the team's practice squad the next day. He was released on September 25, and re-signed to the practice squad on September 29. He was elevated to the active roster on October 24 for the team's week 7 game against the Detroit Lions, and reverted to the practice squad after the game. He was placed on the practice squad/COVID-19 list by the team on December 22, 2020, and restored to the practice squad on January 6, 2021. His practice squad contract with the team expired after the season on January 11, 2021.

=== Kansas City Chiefs ===
On January 13, 2021, Edwards was signed to the Kansas City Chiefs' practice squad. On February 9, 2021, Edwards re-signed with the Chiefs. He was waived on August 31, 2021, and re-signed to the practice squad the next day. He signed a reserve/future contract with the Chiefs on February 2, 2022. He was released on August 16, 2022.

=== Houston Roughnecks ===
On November 17, 2022, Edwards was drafted by the Houston Roughnecks of the XFL. The Roughnecks brand was transferred to the Houston Gamblers when the XFL and USFL merged to create the United Football League (UFL).

=== San Antonio Brahmas ===
On January 5, 2024, Edwards was drafted by the San Antonio Brahmas during the 2024 UFL dispersal draft. He signed with the team on January 31. He was removed from the roster on February 26, 2024.
