= Joshua Kaindoh =

American football player (born 1998)

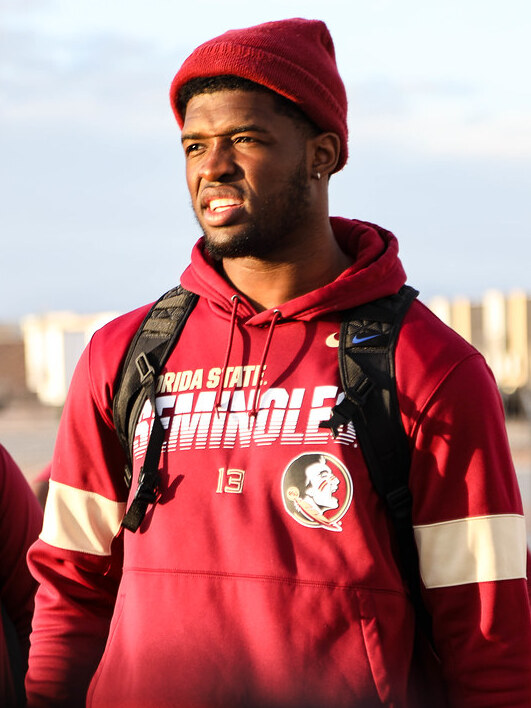
- Kaindoh with Florida State in 2019

Profile
- Position: Defensive end

Personal information
- Born: December 27, 1998 (age 27); Baltimore, Maryland, U.S.
- Listed height: 6 ft 6 in (1.98 m)
- Listed weight: 260 lb (118 kg)

Career information
- High school: IMG Academy (Bradenton, Florida)
- College: Florida State (2017–2020)
- NFL draft: 2021: 4th round, 144th overall pick

Career history
- Kansas City Chiefs (2021–2022)

Awards and highlights
- USA Today All-American (2016); Super Bowl champion (LVII)

Career NFL statistics
- Games played: 3
- Stats at Pro Football Reference

Joshua Kaindoh (born December 27, 1998) is an American former professional football player who was a defensive end for the Kansas City Chiefs of the National Football League (NFL). He played college football for the Florida State Seminoles and was selected by the Kansas City Chiefs in the fourth round of the 2021 NFL draft.

== Professional career ==
Pre-draft measurables
Height	Weight	Arm length	Hand span	40-yard dash	10-yard split	20-yard split	20-yard shuttle	Three-cone drill	Vertical jump	Broad jump	Bench press
6 ft 5 3/4 in (1.97 m)	260 lb (118 kg)	34 1/2 in (0.88 m)	9 1/2 in (0.24 m)	4.68 s	1.58 s	2.70 s	4.43 s	7.21 s	36.5 in (0.93 m)	10 ft 5 in (3.18 m)	21 reps
All values from Pro Day

Kaindoh was selected by the Kansas City Chiefs in the fourth round, 144th overall, of the 2021 NFL draft. He signed his four-year rookie contract on May 13, 2021. Kaindoh was placed on injured reserve on October 5. He was activated on January 12, 2022. Kaindoh won Super Bowl LVII when the Chiefs defeated the Philadelphia Eagles.

On August 29, 2023, Kaindoh was waived by the Chiefs.
