= Orlando Brown (American football, born 1996) =

American football player (born 1996)

Orlando Brown Jr.
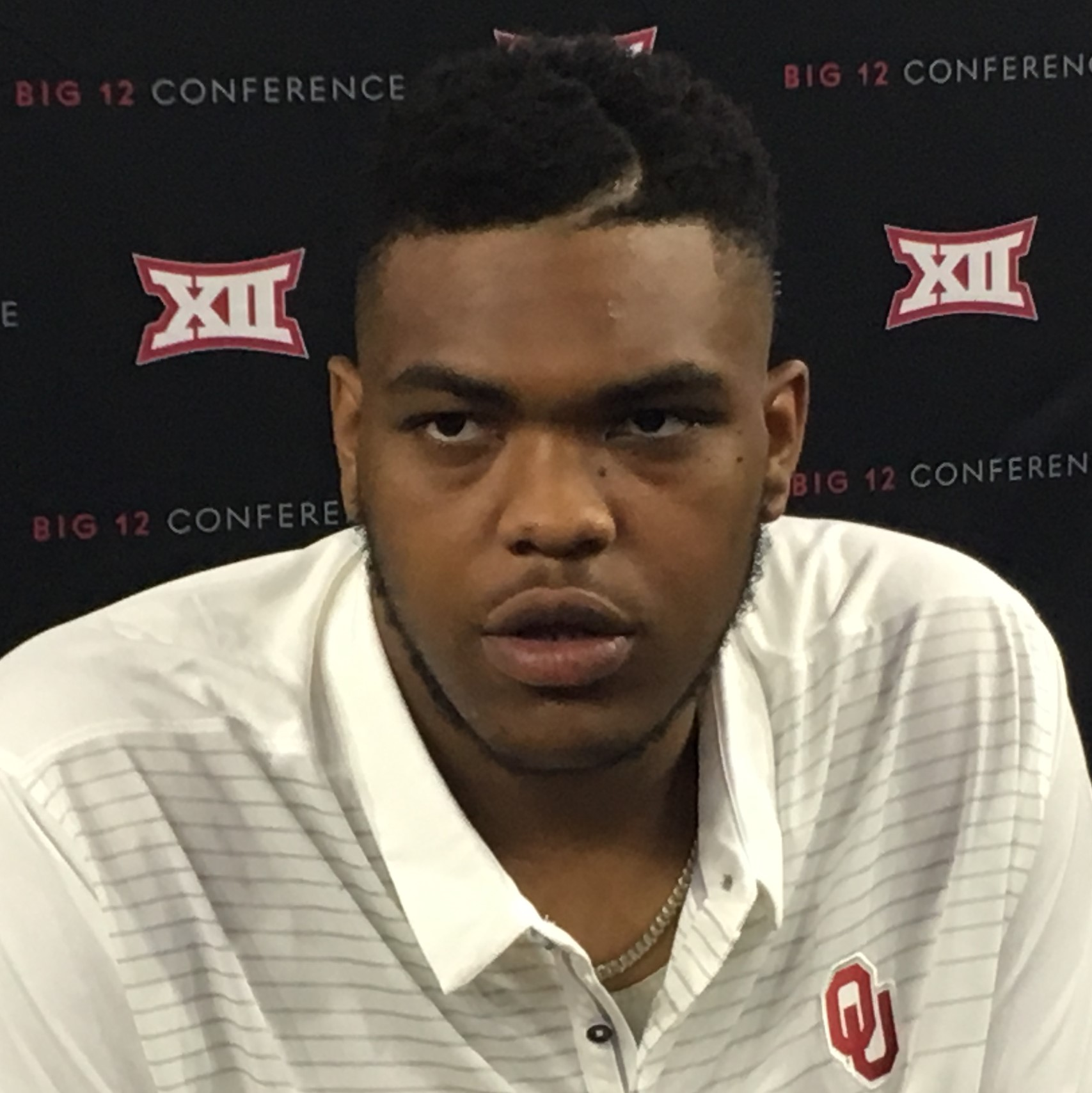
- Brown in 2017

No. 75 – Cincinnati Bengals
- Position: Offensive tackle
- Roster status: Active

Personal information
- Born: May 2, 1996 (age 30); Baltimore, Maryland, U.S.
- Listed height: 6 ft 8 in (2.03 m)
- Listed weight: 350 lb (159 kg)

Career information
- High school: Peachtree Ridge (Suwanee, Georgia)
- College: Oklahoma (2014–2017)
- NFL draft: 2018: 3rd round, 83rd overall pick

Career history
- Baltimore Ravens (2018–2020); Kansas City Chiefs (2021–2022); Cincinnati Bengals (2023–present)

Awards and highlights
- Super Bowl champion (LVII); 4× Pro Bowl (2019–2022); Unanimous All-American (2017); 2× Big 12 Offensive Lineman of the Year (2016, 2017); 2× First-team All-Big 12 (2016, 2017)

Career NFL statistics as of Week 5, 2026
- Games played: 131
- Games started: 125
- Stats at Pro Football Reference

Orlando Claude Brown Jr. (born May 2, 1996) is an American professional football offensive tackle for the Cincinnati Bengals of the National Football League (NFL). He played college football for the Oklahoma Sooners, and was selected by the Baltimore Ravens in the third round of the 2018 NFL draft. Brown is the son of the late Orlando Brown, who also played offensive tackle for the Ravens.

== Early life ==
Brown Jr. attended Peachtree Ridge High School in Suwanee, Georgia, where he played high school football. He was a three-star prospect. He received scholarship offers from Tennessee, Oklahoma, Alabama, Arkansas, and Auburn. Brown initially committed to Tennessee but changed his commitment to Oklahoma.

== College career ==
Brown redshirted his freshman year at Oklahoma in 2014. In 2015, he was named the starting left tackle. In his junior season, Brown made the 2017 College Football All-America Team and was one of three finalists for the Outland Trophy. Oklahoma finished the season 12-2 with a ranking of #3 in the nation, losing to Georgia in the College Football playoffs. On January 3, 2018, Brown announced he was forgoing his senior year and entering the 2018 NFL draft.

== Professional career ==
=== Pre-draft ===
On January 3, 2018, Brown announced his decision to forgo his remaining eligibility and enter the 2018 NFL Draft. Brown attended the NFL Scouting Combine in Indianapolis and performed all of the combine and positional drills, but had a poor performance. His 40-yard dash time was the slowest among any prospect at the combine and was described as a "historically bad time" by NFL analyst Mike Mayock. He also finished last in the bench press, vertical jump, and broad jump among all offensive linemen at the combine. The performance possibly hurt his draft stock after he was widely considered a first round pick among draft experts and scouts.

He fared poorly at the combine, putting up 14 reps on bench press, 5.85 40-yard dash (same as his father's Pro Day score), 82" broad jump, and a 19.5" vertical jump. At Oklahoma's pro day he improved his 40-yard dash (5.68s), 20-yard dash (3.28s), 10-yard dash (1.88s), bench press (18), vertical jump (25.5"), and broad jump (89"). Brown attended visits and private workouts with multiple teams, including the Jacksonville Jaguars, Baltimore Ravens, Philadelphia Eagles, and Detroit Lions. At the conclusion of the pre-draft process, Brown was projected to be a second or third round pick by NFL draft experts and scouts. He was ranked as the fourth best offensive tackle in the draft by Sports Illustrated, was ranked the sixth best offensive tackle by DraftScout.com and Scouts Inc., and was ranked the eighth best offensive tackle by NFL analyst Mike Mayock.

External videos
- Orlando Brown Jr.'s NFL Combine Workout
- Orlando Brown Jr.'s 40-yard dash
- 2018 NFL Draft Profile: Orlando Brown Jr.

Pre-draft measurables
Height	Weight	Arm length	Hand span	Wingspan	40-yard dash	10-yard split	20-yard split	20-yard shuttle	Three-cone drill	Vertical jump	Broad jump	Bench press
6 ft 7 7/8 in (2.03 m)	345 lb (156 kg)	35 in (0.89 m)	9 3/4 in (0.25 m)	7 ft 1 1/8 in (2.16 m)	5.68 s	1.88 s	3.29 s	5.38 s	7.87 s	25.5 in (0.65 m)	7 ft 5 in (2.26 m)	18 reps
All values from NFL Combine/Pro Day

=== Baltimore Ravens ===
The Baltimore Ravens selected Brown in the third round (83rd overall) of the 2018 NFL Draft. Brown was the ninth offensive tackle drafted in 2018 and was considered by analysts to be one of the biggest steals in the draft.

External videos
- Ravens draft Orlando Brown Jr. 83rd overall

On May 16, 2018, the Ravens signed Brown to a four-year, $3.49 million contract that included a signing bonus of $865,720. In his rookie season, he appeared in all 16 games and started 10 games at right tackle. He started in the Wild Card loss to the Los Angeles Chargers.

On January 15, 2020, Brown, who had been named as an alternate at offensive tackle to the 2020 Pro Bowl, was added to the active Pro Bowl roster, replacing injured Oakland Raider Trent Brown. Brown was named to his second Pro Bowl in 2020. Brown would request a trade from the Ravens in the offseason, citing a desire to move back to left tackle.

=== Kansas City Chiefs ===
On April 23, 2021, Brown was traded to the Kansas City Chiefs, along with a second-round pick (58th overall) in the 2021 NFL draft and a sixth-round pick in the 2022 NFL draft, in exchange for the Chiefs' first-round pick (31st overall) in the 2021 NFL Draft, a third-round pick (94th overall), a fourth-round pick (136th overall) and a 2022 fifth-round selection. Brown was named to the Pro Bowl on his first season with the team.

The Chiefs placed the non-exclusive franchise tag on Brown on March 7, 2022. After failing to reach a long-term contract, he signed his franchise tag tender on August 2. The tender was worth $16.7 million. Brown helped the Chiefs win Super Bowl LVII against the Eagles 38-35 to give Brown his first Super Bowl victory.

=== Cincinnati Bengals ===
On March 17, 2023, Brown signed a four-year, $64 million contract with the Cincinnati Bengals.

During the 2024 campaign, Brown started 11 games for Cincinnati, despite suffering a fractured fibula in Week 7 against the Cleveland Browns.

On March 12, 2026, Brown re-signed with the Bengals on a two-year, $32 million contract.

== See also ==
- List of second-generation National Football League players
