= 2020 Kansas City Chiefs season =

61st season in franchise history; fourth Super Bowl appearance, second Super Bowl loss

- Owner: The Hunt family (Clark Hunt Chairman and CEO)
- General manager: Brett Veach
- Head coach: Andy Reid
- Offensive coordinator: Eric Bieniemy
- Defensive coordinator: Steve Spagnuolo
- Home stadium: Arrowhead Stadium

Results
- Record: 14–2
- Division place: 1st AFC West
- Playoffs: Won Divisional Playoffs (vs. Browns) 22–17; Won AFC Championship (vs. Bills) 38–24; Lost Super Bowl LV (vs. (Note: Despite being played in the Buccaneers' home stadium, the Super Bowl is still officially considered a neutral site game.) Buccaneers) 9–31
- All-Pros: 5: WR Tyreek Hill (1st team); TE Travis Kelce (1st team); S Tyrann Mathieu (1st team); QB Patrick Mahomes (2nd team); DT Chris Jones (2nd team)
- Pro Bowlers: 7: Selected but did not participate due to participation in Super Bowl LV: QB Patrick Mahomes; WR Tyreek Hill; TE Travis Kelce; OT Eric Fisher; DE Frank Clark; DT Chris Jones; SS Tyrann Mathieu
- Team MVP: Travis Kelce
- Team ROY: Clyde Edwards-Helaire

Uniform
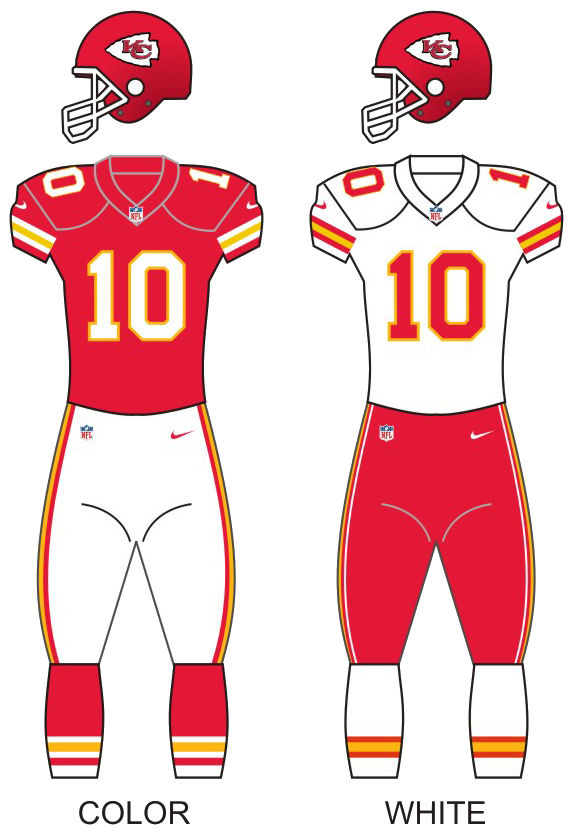

The 2020 season was the Kansas City Chiefs' 51st in the National Football League (NFL), their 61st season overall and their eighth under head coach Andy Reid. The Chiefs, who entered the season as defending Super Bowl LIV champions, qualified for the playoffs for the sixth consecutive season, tying a franchise record set from 1990 to 1995 and won the division for the fifth consecutive year. They finished with a league-leading 14–2 record, the best record in Chiefs history until the 2024 season. The Chiefs appeared in Super Bowl LV, their second consecutive Super Bowl appearance and fourth in franchise history, but lost to the Tampa Bay Buccaneers, 31–9. With the loss, the Chiefs became the sixth defending Super Bowl champion to lose the next year's game, after the 1978 Dallas Cowboys, the 1983 Washington Redskins, the 1997 Green Bay Packers, the 2014 Seattle Seahawks, and the 2017 New England Patriots. Their 2024 counterpart would later join this list.

== Season summary ==
In the offseason, the Chiefs released the longest tenured player in franchise history, punter Dustin Colquitt, who had been with the team since 2005. Colquitt was later signed to the Chiefs practice squad shortly before the playoffs.

The biggest move of the offseason, however, was signing quarterback Patrick Mahomes to a ten-year, $503-million-dollar extension, the largest contract in American sports history.

On August 17, the Chiefs announced that due to the COVID-19 pandemic, their stadium will be filled at about 22% capacity, or about 16,000 fans. Additionally, fans in attendance will be required to wear a face covering when they are not actively eating or drinking. Season tickets were not sold, however, season ticket holders from 2019 that did not cancelled season tickets, still had the option to buy season tickets in 2021.

After a 34–20 Week 3 win over the Baltimore Ravens, the Chiefs set a franchise record for consecutive wins including the playoffs with 12. The streak was snapped two weeks later at 13 with a Week 5 loss to the Las Vegas Raiders. Following a Week 4 victory over the New England Patriots, the Chiefs became the first team in NFL history to open their season 4–0 in four consecutive seasons. The Chiefs clinched their fifth consecutive AFC West title after defeating the Miami Dolphins in Week 14. The victory also gave the Chiefs their first 12–1 record in franchise history. A Week 16 victory over the Atlanta Falcons gave the Chiefs their franchise record 14th win. It also clinched home-field advantage throughout the playoffs. The Chiefs finished the season undefeated on the road for the first time in franchise history and with a 14–2 overall record, the best in the NFL during the season. In doing so, the Chiefs became the first team since the 2016 New England Patriots to achieve an 8–0 road record in the regular season.

Following their win in the divisional round of the playoffs against the Browns, Kansas City became the first AFC team ever to host three consecutive conference championship games, and the second team in NFL history to host three consecutive conference championships. The other team was the Philadelphia Eagles from 2002 to 2004, who were also coached by Andy Reid. The win also gave the Chiefs their 3rd consecutive season winning at least one playoff game, after losing 11 of their previous 12 playoff games. In the AFC Championship, the Chiefs beat the Buffalo Bills 38–24 and advanced to Super Bowl LV, their second consecutive Super Bowl appearance and fourth all-time Super Bowl appearance. They went on to lose to the Tampa Bay Buccaneers in the Super Bowl, becoming the first team since the 2017 New England Patriots to win a Super Bowl but lose the following one the next season.

== NFL Top 100 ==
The Chiefs had six players named to the Top 100. Tight end Travis Kelce is the only player who was ranked higher than the previous season. Defending Super Bowl MVP quarterback Patrick Mahomes was the highest rated Chiefs player on the list at fourth. Mahomes selection of fourth (behind fellow quarterbacks Lamar Jackson and Russell Wilson, as well as defensive tackle Aaron Donald) drew criticism from multiple NFL analysts and fans. SB Nation’s Chiefs site Arrowhead Pride said they will no longer report on the Top 100 following Mahomes being selected fourth.

Rank	Player	Position	Change
4	Patrick Mahomes	Quarterback	0
18	Travis Kelce	Tight end	▲3
22	Tyreek Hill	Wide receiver	▼3
39	Tyrann Mathieu	Safety	NR
52	Chris Jones	Defensive tackle	▼16
95	Frank Clark	Defensive end	▼10

== Offseason ==
=== Coaching staff changes ===
2020 Kansas City Chiefs Coaching staff changes
Old coach	Position	New coach
Vacant	Passing game coordinator	Mike Kafka*
Rod Wilson	Assistant special teams coordinator	Andy Hill

*Mike Kafka will continue serving in his role as quarterbacks coach, but will have additional duties as passing game coordinator

=== Players added ===
Below are players signed following the conclusion of the 2019 season, some of the players signed spent a portion of the 2019 NFL season on the practice squad and/or active roster.

2020 Kansas City Chiefs Players added
Player	Position
Taco Charlton	DE
Adrian Colbert	S
Felton Davis	WR
Gehrig Dieter*	WR
Jody Fortson*	WR
Antonio Hamilton	CB
Darius Harris	LB
Daniel Helm	TE
Braxton Hoyett*	DT
Nick Keizer*	TE
Daniel Kilgore	C
Chris Lammons*	CB
Devaroe Lawrence*	DT
John Lovett	FB
Elijah McGuire*	RB
Tyler Newsome	P
Kelechi Osemele	G
Mike Remmers	T
Ricky Seals-Jones	TE
Emmanuel Smith*	LB
Andrew Soroh	S
Jordan Ta'amu	QB
Tedric Thompson	S
Tim Ward	DE
DeAndré Washington	RB

*Indicates player finished the previous season on the Chiefs' practice squad

=== Players lost ===
Below are players who were on the roster at the end of the 2019 season, but were either released or did not re-sign after their contract expired.

2020 Kansas City Chiefs Players lost
Player	Position
Blake Bell	TE
Morris Claiborne	CB
Dustin Colquitt	P
Felton Davis	WR
Kendall Fuller	CB
Darron Lee	OLB
Jordan Lucas	S
Marcus Marshall	RB
LeSean McCoy	RB
Emmanuel Ogbah	DE
Reggie Ragland	LB
Keith Reaser	CB
Terrell Suggs	DE
Spencer Ware	RB
Xavier Williams	DT
Stefen Wisniewski	G
David Wells	TE

=== Draft ===
2020 Kansas City Chiefs Draft
Round	Selection	Player	Position	College
1	32	Clyde Edwards-Helaire	Running back	LSU
2	63	Willie Gay	Linebacker	Mississippi State
3	96	Lucas Niang	Offensive tackle	TCU
4	138	L'Jarius Sneed	Safety	Louisiana Tech
5	177	Mike Danna	Defensive end	Michigan
7	237	BoPete Keyes	Cornerback	Tulane

Trades

- The Chiefs traded linebacker Dee Ford to the San Francisco 49ers in exchange for their 2nd round draft pick (63rd overall).
- The Chiefs traded their 2nd round selection (64th overall), in addition to 2019 draft picks, to the Seattle Seahawks in exchange for defensive end Frank Clark and a 2019 draft pick.
- The Chiefs traded their 6th round selection (211th overall) to the New York Jets in exchange for linebacker Darron Lee
- The Chiefs traded their 7th round selection (246th overall) to the Miami Dolphins in exchange for safety Jordan Lucas.
- The Chiefs traded their 6th-round pick in 2021 NFL draft to the Tennessee Titans in exchange for their 237th pick in the 2020 draft.

=== Undrafted free agents ===
2020 Kansas City Chiefs Undrafted Free Agents
Player	Position	College
Andre Baccellia	WR	Washington
Hakeem Bailey	CB	West Virginia
Rodney Clemons	S	SMU
Omari Cobb	LB	Marshall
Jarvaris Davis	CB	Auburn
Yasir Durant	OT	Missouri
Jovahn Fair	OT	Temple
Maurice Ffrench	WR	Pittsburgh
Aleva Hifo	WR	BYU
Lavert Hill	CB	Michigan
Jalen Julius	S	Mississippi State
Kalija Lipscomb	WR	Vanderbilt
Shea Patterson	QB	Michigan
Justice Shelton-Mosley	WR	Vanderbilt
Tommy Townsend	P	Florida
Tershawn Wharton	DT	Missouri S&T
Cody White	WR	Michigan State
Darryl Williams	C	Mississippi State
Bryan Wright	LB	Cincinnati

=== Signed and released in the offseason ===
Below are players who were signed and released in the offseason before playing a game for the Chiefs in the 2020 season. These players were not a part of the final roster cut downs prior to the start of the regular season.

2020 Kansas City Chiefs Signed and released in the offseason
Player	Position
Anthony Lanier	DT
Alizé Mack	TE
Shea Patterson	QB
Kyle Shurmur	QB
Mike Weber	RB
Cody White	WR
JaVarius Davis	CB
Jovahn Fair	G
Jalen Julius	S
John Lovett	FB
Tyler Newsome	P
Byran Wright	LB
Andrew Soroh	S
Aleva Hifo	WR
Andre Baccellia	WR
Hakeem Bailey	CB
Emmanuel Smith	LB

=== COVID-19 opt-outs ===
On July 24, 2020, NFL owners and the NFL Players Association approved giving players the option to opt out of playing during the entire 2020 season as precaution due to the COVID-19 pandemic. The players listed below opted-out before the August 6 deadline and did not play.

2020 Kansas City Chiefs COVID-19 opt-outs
Player	Position
Laurent Duvernay-Tardif	G
Damien Williams	RB
Lucas Niang	OT

=== Final roster cutdown ===
The following players were released to bring the roster to the league mandated 53 players before week 1. In addition to the following 24 players being released, the Chiefs also placed two players on the reserve/suspended list and placed one player on the PUP list.

2020 Kansas City Chiefs Final roster cutdown
Player	Position
Jackson Barton	T
Rodney Clemons	DB
Omari Cobb	LB
Adrian Colbert	S
Gehrig Dieter	WR
Maurice Ffrench	WR
Jody Fortson	WR
Darius Harris	LB
Daniel Helm	TE
Lavert Hill	DB
Braxton Hoyett	DT
Ryan Hunter	G
Chris Lammons	CB
Devaroe Lawrence	DT
Kalija Lipscomb	WR
Elijah McGuire	RB
Matt Moore	QB
Greg Senat	T
Justice Shelton-Mosley	WR
Breeland Speaks	DE
Jordan Ta'amu	QB
Tim Ward	DE
DeAndré Washington	RB
Darryl Williams	OL

== In-season transactions ==
All transactions listed in this section occurred after the Chiefs released their initial 53 player roster.

=== Suspensions served ===
The players listed below served a suspension at some point during the season. The length, reason, and weeks served are all listed below.

2020 Kansas City Chiefs Suspensions served
Player	Position	Reason	Length	Weeks served
Bashaud Breeland	CB	Personal conduct and positive test for marijuana	4 games	1–4
Mike Pennel	DT	Positive test for PEDs	2 games	1–2

=== Signings ===
2020 Kansas City Chiefs In-season signings
Player	Position
Le'Veon Bell	RB

=== Practice squad elevations ===
2020 Kansas City Chiefs Practice squad elevations
Player	Position	Final status*
Braxton Hoyett	DT	Ravens PS
DeAndré Washington	RB	Dolphins roster
Darius Harris	LB	Chiefs roster
Danny Isidora	G	Steelers roster
Marcus Kemp	WR	Chiefs roster
Bryan Witzmann	G	Chiefs PS
Gehrig Dieter	WR	Chiefs PS
Tim Ward	DE	Chiefs roster
Chris Lammons	CB	Chiefs roster
Stefen Wisniewski	G	Chiefs roster
Deandre Baker	CB	Chiefs PS
Emmanuel Smith	LB	Chiefs PS
Omari Cobb	LB	Chiefs PS

*Roster status as of Super Bowl LV

=== Trades ===
2020 Kansas City Chiefs trades
Team	Player/pick Received	Compensation
Miami Dolphins	6th-round pick 2021 NFL draft	RB DeAndré Washington; 7th-round pick 2021 NFL Draft

=== Cuts ===
2020 Kansas City Chiefs cuts
Player	Position
Tedric Thompson	CB
Ricky Seals-Jones*	TE

*Signed to practice squad after release

=== Injured reserve returns ===
The following players spent a portion of the season on injured reserve and were eventually activated off of it.

2020 Kansas City Chiefs Injured reserve returns
Player	Position	Date added	Date removed
Khalen Saunders	DT	September 19	October 24
L'Jarius Sneed	CB	September 30	November 21
Mike Danna	DT	October 10	October 31
Alex Okafor	DE	October 24	November 21

== Staff ==
2020 Kansas City Chiefs staff
Front office: Chairman/CEO – Clark Hunt; President – Mark Donovan; General manager – Brett Veach; Football operations counsel and personnel executive – Chris Shea; Director of football operations – Mike Borgonzi; Assistant directors of player personnel – Mike Bradway and Ryan Poles; Director of pro personnel – Tim Terry; Director of college scouting – Ryne Nutt; Director of football administration – Brandt Tilis; College scouting coordinator – Greg Castillo; Head coaches: Head coach – Andy Reid; Assistant head coach/special teams coordinator – Dave Toub; Offensive coaches: Offensive coordinator – Eric Bieniemy; Quarterbacks/passing game coordinator – Mike Kafka; Running backs – Deland McCullough; Wide receivers – Greg Lewis; Tight ends – Tom Melvin; Offensive line – Andy Heck; Assistant offensive line – Corey Matthaei; Pass game analyst/assistant quarterbacks – Joe Bleymaier; Offensive quality control – David Girardi; Offensive quality control – Porter Ellett	Defensive coaches: Defensive coordinator – Steve Spagnuolo; Run game coordinator/defensive line – Brendan Daly; Linebackers/outside linebackers – Britt Reid; Linebackers – Matt House; Defensive backs – Dave Merritt; Defensive backs/cornerbacks – Sam Madison; Defensive assistant – Connor Embree; Defensive quality control – Terry Bradden; Defensive quality control – Alex Whittingham; Special teams coaches: Assistant special teams – Andy Hill; Strength and conditioning: Strength and conditioning – Barry Rubin; Assistant strength and conditioning – Travis Crittenden; Assistant strength and conditioning – Devin Woodhouse; Sports science/conditioning – Ryan Reynolds

== Final roster ==
2020 Kansas City Chiefs roster
Quarterbacks (QB): 4 Chad Henne; 15 Patrick Mahomes; Running backs (RB): 26 Le'Veon Bell; 25 Clyde Edwards-Helaire; 42 Anthony Sherman; 34 Darwin Thompson; 31 Darrel Williams; Wide receivers (WR): 17 Mecole Hardman; 10 Tyreek Hill; 13 Byron Pringle; 11 Demarcus Robinson; 14 Sammy Watkins; Tight ends (TE): 48 Nick Keizer; 87 Travis Kelce; 83 Ricky Seals-Jones; 82 Deon Yelder	Offensive linemen (OL): 73 Nick Allegretti G; 79 Yasir Durant T; 67 Daniel Kilgore C; 74 Martinas Rankin T; 62 Austin Reiter C; 75 Mike Remmers T/G; 61 Stefen Wisniewski G; 77 Andrew Wylie G/T; Defensive linemen (DL): 55 Frank Clark DE; 51 Mike Danna DE; 95 Chris Jones DT; 92 Tanoh Kpassagnon DE; 91 Derrick Nnadi DT; 57 Alex Okafor DE; 64 Mike Pennel DT; 99 Khalen Saunders DT; 90 Tim Ward DE; 98 Tershawn Wharton DT	Linebackers (LB): 47 Darius Harris OLB; 53 Anthony Hitchens MLB; 56 Ben Niemann OLB/MLB; 44 Dorian O'Daniel OLB; 54 Damien Wilson OLB; Defensive backs (DB): 21 Bashaud Breeland CB; 27 Rashad Fenton CB; 20 Antonio Hamilton CB; 29 BoPete Keyes CB; 45 Chris Lammons CB; 32 Tyrann Mathieu SS; 38 L'Jarius Sneed CB; 49 Daniel Sorensen FS; 22 Juan Thornhill FS; 35 Charvarius Ward CB; 23 Armani Watts SS; Special teams (ST): 7 Harrison Butker K; 5 Tommy Townsend P; 41 James Winchester LS	Practice squad: 30 Deandre Baker CB (PS/I); 80 Evan Baylis TE; 59 Omari Cobb OLB; 2 Dustin Colquitt P; 12 Gehrig Dieter WR; 97 Austin Edwards DE; 89 Maurice Ffrench WR; 88 Jody Fortson TE; 52 Demone Harris DE; 85 Marcus Kemp WR; 24 Elijah McGuire RB; 8 Matt Moore QB; 60 Patrick Omameh G; 19 Tajae Sharpe WR; 43 Emmanuel Smith MLB (PS/I); -- Darryl Williams C; 68 Bryan Witzmann G; Reserve: 30 Alex Brown CB (IR); 94 Taco Charlton DE (IR); 76 Laurent Duvernay-Tardif G (Opt-out); 72 Eric Fisher T (IR); 50 Willie Gay (IR) OLB/MLB; -- Lucas Niang T (Opt-out); 70 Kelechi Osemele G (IR); 71 Mitchell Schwartz T (IR); -- Damien Williams RB (Opt-out); Rookies in italics 53 active, 9 reserve, 15 practice squad (2 exempt)

== Preseason cancellation ==
The Chiefs' preseason schedule was announced on May 7, but was later cancelled due to the COVID-19 pandemic.

Week	Date	Opponent	Venue	Result
1	August 15	Cincinnati Bengals	Arrowhead Stadium	Cancelled due to the COVID-19 pandemic
2	August 22	at Arizona Cardinals	State Farm Stadium	Cancelled due to the COVID-19 pandemic
3	August 29	at Dallas Cowboys	AT&T Stadium	Cancelled due to the COVID-19 pandemic
4	September 3	Green Bay Packers	Arrowhead Stadium	Cancelled due to the COVID-19 pandemic

== Regular season ==
=== Schedule ===
As the defending Super Bowl champions, the Chiefs earned the right to host the NFL Kickoff Game, which occurred on September 10. The Chiefs' 2020 schedule was announced on May 7.

Week	Date	Opponent	Result	Record	Venue	Recap
1	September 10	Houston Texans	**W** 34–20	1–0	Arrowhead Stadium	Recap
2	September 20	at **Los Angeles Chargers**	**W** 23–20 (OT)	2–0	SoFi Stadium	Recap
3	September 28	at Baltimore Ravens	**W** 34–20	3–0	M&T Bank Stadium	Recap
4 (Note: Due to positive COVID-19 tests from Chiefs' practice squad quarterback Jordan Ta'amu and Patriots' quarterback Cam Newton, the NFL announced the game would be postponed to give both teams time to see if any other players had caught the virus. Following all additional tests coming back negative, the NFL announced the game would be played on October 5.)	October 5	New England Patriots	**W** 26–10	4–0	Arrowhead Stadium	Recap
5	October 11	**Las Vegas Raiders**	**L** 32–40	4–1	Arrowhead Stadium	Recap
6 (Note: The Chiefs' Week 6 game at the Buffalo Bills was rescheduled from October 15 (Thursday) to October 19 (Monday), due to a COVID-19 outbreak within the Titans' organization that forced the Bills–Titans game during Week 5 to be rescheduled from October 11 to October 13.)	October 19	at Buffalo Bills	**W** 26–17	5–1	Bills Stadium	Recap
7	October 25	at **Denver Broncos**	**W** 43–16	6–1	Empower Field at Mile High	Recap
8	November 1	New York Jets	**W** 35–9	7–1	Arrowhead Stadium	Recap
9	November 8	Carolina Panthers	**W** 33–31	8–1	Arrowhead Stadium	Recap
10	Bye					
11	November 22	at **Las Vegas Raiders**	**W** 35–31	9–1	Allegiant Stadium	Recap
12	November 29	at Tampa Bay Buccaneers	**W** 27–24	10–1	Raymond James Stadium	Recap
13	December 6	**Denver Broncos**	**W** 22–16	11–1	Arrowhead Stadium	Recap
14	December 13	at Miami Dolphins	**W** 33–27	12–1	Hard Rock Stadium	Recap
15	December 20	at New Orleans Saints	**W** 32–29	13–1	Mercedes-Benz Superdome	Recap
16	December 27	Atlanta Falcons	**W** 17–14	14–1	Arrowhead Stadium	Recap
17	January 3	**Los Angeles Chargers**	**L** 21–38	14–2	Arrowhead Stadium	Recap

Note: Intra-division opponents are in bold text.

=== Game summaries ===
==== Week 1: vs. Houston Texans ====
NFL Kickoff Game

Week 1: Houston Texans at Kansas City Chiefs – Game summary

Quarter	1	2	3	4	Total
Texans	7	0	0	13	**20**
**Chiefs**	0	17	7	10	**34**

at Arrowhead Stadium, Kansas City, Missouri

- Date: September 10
- Game time: 7:20 p.m. CDT
- Game weather: Cloudy, 56 °F (13 °C)
- Game attendance: 15,895
- Referee: Clete Blakeman
- TV announcers (NBC): Al Michaels, Cris Collinsworth and Michele Tafoya
- Recap, Game Book

Game information

**First quarter**

- HOU – David Johnson 19-yard run (Kaʻimi Fairbairn kick), 4:54. Texans 7–0. **Drive: 9 plays, 80 yards, 5:12.**

**Second quarter**

- KC – Travis Kelce 6-yard pass from Patrick Mahomes (Harrison Butker kick), 14:13. Tied 7–7. **Drive: 11 plays, 75 yards, 5:41.**
- KC – Sammy Watkins 2-yard pass from Patrick Mahomes (Harrison Butker kick), 2:26. Chiefs 14–7. **Drive: 16 plays, 91 yards, 9:04.**
- KC – Harrison Butker 29-yard field goal, 0:00. Chiefs 17–7. **Drive: 4 plays, 48 yards, 4:07.**

**Third quarter**

- KC – Clyde Edwards-Helaire 27-yard run (Harrison Butker kick), 10:53. Chiefs 24–7. **Drive: 7 plays, 75 yards, 4:07.**

**Fourth quarter**

- KC – Tyreek Hill 3-yard pass from Patrick Mahomes (Harrison Butker kick), 11:25. Chiefs 31–7. **6 plays, 17 yards, 2:50.**
- HOU – Jordan Akins 19-yard pass from Deshaun Watson (pass failed), 7:15. Chiefs 31–13. **Drive: 10 plays, 75 yards, 4:10.**
- HOU – Deshaun Watson 1-yard run (Kaʻimi Fairbairn kick), 2:38. Chiefs 31–20. **Drive: 7 plays, 65 yards, 2:51.**
- KC – Harrison Butker 19-yard field goal, 0:30. Chiefs 34–20. **Drive: 6 plays, 19 yards, 2:08.**

**Top passers**

- HOU – Deshaun Watson – 20/32, 253 yards, TD, INT
- KC – Patrick Mahomes – 24/32, 211 yards, 3 TD

**Top rushers**

- HOU – David Johnson – 11 rushes, 77 yards, TD
- KC – Clyde Edwards-Helaire – 25 rushes, 138 yards, TD

**Top receivers**

- HOU – Will Fuller – 8 receptions, 112 yards
- KC – Sammy Watkins – 7 receptions, 82 yards, TD

==== Week 2: at Los Angeles Chargers ====
Week 2: Kansas City Chiefs at Los Angeles Chargers – Game summary

Quarter	1	2	3	4	OT	Total
**Chiefs**	0	6	3	11	3	**23**
Chargers	7	7	3	3	0	**20**

at SoFi Stadium, Inglewood, California

- Date: September 20
- Game time: 3:25 p.m. CDT/1:25 p.m. PDT
- Game weather: Sunny, 75 °F (24 °C)
- Game attendance: 0
- Referee: Carl Cheffers
- TV announcers (CBS): Jim Nantz, Tony Romo and Tracy Wolfson
- Recap, Game Book

Game information

**First quarter**

- LAC – Justin Herbert 4-yard run (Michael Badgley kick), 11:23. Chargers 7–0. **Drive: 8 plays, 79 yards, 3:37.**

**Second quarter**

- KC – Travis Kelce 10-yard pass from Patrick Mahomes (kick blocked), 8:51. Chargers 7–6. **Drive: 10 plays, 73 yards, 4:36.**
- LAC – Jalen Guyton 14-yard pass from Justin Herbert (Michael Badgley kick), 2:30. Chargers 14–6. **Drive: 11 plays, 71 yards, 6:21.**

**Third quarter**

- LAC – Michael Badgley 41-yard field goal, 8:07. Chargers 17–6. **Drive: 12 plays, 57 yards, 4:50.**
- KC – Harrison Butker 58-yard field goal, 3:11. Chargers 17–9. **Drive: 9 plays, 35 yards, 4:56.**

**Fourth quarter**

- KC – Tyreek Hill 54-yard pass from Patrick Mahomes (Patrick Mahomes–Mecole Hardman pass), 12:48. Tied 17–17. **Drive: 6 plays, 95 yards, 2:31.**
- LAC – Michael Badgley 23-yard field goal, 2:27. Chargers 20–17. **Drive: 17 plays, 82 yards, 10:21.**
- KC – Harrison Butker 30-yard field goal, 0:00. Tied 20–20. **Drive: 12 plays, 63 yards, 2:27.**

**Overtime**

- KC – Harrison Butker 58-yard field goal, 1:55. Chiefs 23–20. **Drive: 13 plays, 39 yards, 5:52.**

**Top passers**

- KC – Patrick Mahomes – 27/47, 302 yards, 2 TD
- LAC – Justin Herbert – 22/33, 311 yards, TD, INT

**Top rushers**

- KC – Patrick Mahomes – 6 rushes, 54 yards
- LAC – Austin Ekeler – 16 rushes, 93 yards

**Top receivers**

- KC – Tyreek Hill – 5 receptions, 99 yards, TD
- LAC – Keenan Allen – 7 receptions, 96 yards

==== Week 3: at Baltimore Ravens ====
Week 3: Kansas City Chiefs at Baltimore Ravens – Game summary

Quarter	1	2	3	4	Total
**Chiefs**	6	21	0	7	**34**
Ravens	3	7	3	7	**20**

at M&T Bank Stadium, Baltimore, Maryland

- Date: September 28
- Game time: 8:15 p.m. EDT/7:15 p.m. CDT
- Game weather: Mostly cloudy, 73 °F (23 °C)
- Game attendance: 0
- Referee: John Hussey
- TV announcers (ESPN): Steve Levy, Brian Griese, Louis Riddick and Lisa Salters
- Recap, Game Book

Game information

**First quarter**

- BAL – Justin Tucker 26-yard field goal, 9:20. Ravens 3–0. **Drive: 11 plays, 67 yards, 5:40.**
- KC – Patrick Mahomes 3-yard run (kick failed, wide left), 6:43. Chiefs 6–3. **Drive: 6 plays, 75 yards, 2:37.**

**Second quarter**

- KC – Anthony Sherman 5-yard pass from Patrick Mahomes (Harrison Butker kick), 12:52. Chiefs 13–3. **Drive: 13 plays, 68 yards, 6:20.**
- BAL – Devin Duvernay 93-yard kickoff return (Justin Tucker kick), 12:40. Chiefs 13–10.
- KC – Tyreek Hill 20-yard pass from Patrick Mahomes (Harrison Butker kick), 6:40. Chiefs 20–10. **Drive: 6 plays, 73 yards, 3:26.**
- KC – Mecole Hardman 49-yard pass from Patrick Mahomes (Harrison Butker kick), 1:48. Chiefs 27–10. **Drive: 7 plays, 84 yards, 2:51.**

**Third quarter**

- BAL – Justin Tucker 42-yard field goal, 6:13. Chiefs 27–13. **Drive: 12 plays, 55 yards, 6:43.**

**Fourth quarter**

- BAL – Nick Boyle 5-yard pass from Lamar Jackson (Justin Tucker kick), 14:55. Chiefs 27–20. **Drive: 6 plays, 49 yards, 3:02.**
- KC – Eric Fisher 2-yard pass from Patrick Mahomes (Harrison Butker kick), 8:14. Chiefs 34–20. **Drive: 13 plays, 75 yards, 6:41.**

**Top passers**

- KC – Patrick Mahomes – 31/42, 385 yards, 4 TD
- BAL – Lamar Jackson – 15/28, 97 yards, TD

**Top rushers**

- KC – Clyde Edwards-Helaire – 20 rush, 64 yards
- BAL – Lamar Jackson – 9 rushes, 83 yards

**Top receivers**

- KC – Travis Kelce – 6 receptions, 87 yards
- BAL – J. K. Dobbins – 4 receptions, 38 yards

==== Week 4: vs. New England Patriots ====
Week 4: New England Patriots at Kansas City Chiefs – Game summary

Quarter	1	2	3	4	Total
Patriots	0	3	0	7	**10**
**Chiefs**	6	0	7	13	**26**

at Arrowhead Stadium, Kansas City, Missouri

- Date: October 5
- Game time: 6:05 p.m. CDT
- Game weather: Clear, 73 °F (23 °C)
- Game attendance: 12,729
- Referee: Tony Corrente
- TV announcers (CBS): Jim Nantz, Tony Romo and Tracy Wolfson
- Recap, Game Book

Game information

**First quarter**

- KC – Harrison Butker 23-yard field goal, 10:08. Chiefs 3–0. **Drive: 11 plays, 70 yards, 4:52.**
- KC – Harrison Butker 39-yard field goal, 0:13. Chiefs 6–0. **Drive: 8 plays, 75 yards, 4:25.**

**Second quarter**

- NE – Nick Folk 43-yard field goal, 9:31. Chiefs 6–3. **Drive: 13 plays, 60 yards, 5:20.**

**Third quarter**

- KC – Tyreek Hill 6-yard pass from Patrick Mahomes (Harrison Butker kick), 0:42. Chiefs 13–3. **Drive: 7 plays, 85 yards, 3:10.**

**Fourth quarter**

- NE – N'Keal Harry 4-yard pass from Jarrett Stidham (Nick Folk kick), 13:45. Chiefs 13–10. **Drive: 6 plays, 75 yards, 1:57.**
- KC – Mecole Hardman 6-yard pass from Patrick Mahomes (kick failed, wide left), 8:57. Chiefs 19–10. **Drive: 9 plays, 75 yards, 4:48.**
- KC – Tyrann Mathieu 25-yard interception return (Harrison Butker kick), 8:48. Chiefs 26–10.

**Top passers**

- NE – Brian Hoyer – 15/24, 130 yards, INT
- KC – Patrick Mahomes – 29/39, 236 yards, 2 TD

**Top rushers**

- NE – Damien Harris – 17 rushes, 100 yards
- KC – Clyde Edwards-Helaire – 16 rushes, 64 yards

**Top receivers**

- NE – Damiere Byrd – 5 receptions, 80 yards
- KC – Travis Kelce – 3 receptions, 70 yards

==== Week 5: vs. Las Vegas Raiders ====
Week 5: Las Vegas Raiders at Kansas City Chiefs – Game summary

Quarter	1	2	3	4	Total
**Raiders**	3	21	0	16	**40**
Chiefs	7	17	0	8	**32**

at Arrowhead Stadium, Kansas City, Missouri

- Date: October 11
- Game time: 12:00 p.m. CDT
- Game weather: Sunny, 80 °F (27 °C)
- Game attendance: 13,311
- Referee: Clete Blakeman
- TV announcers (CBS): Ian Eagle, Charles Davis and Evan Washburn
- Recap, Game Book

Game information

**First quarter**

- LV – Daniel Carlson 38-yard field goal, 6:49. Raiders 3–0. **Drive: 11 plays, 75 yards, 5:45.**
- KC – Patrick Mahomes 3-yard run (Harrison Butker kick), 2:06. Chiefs 7–3. **Drive: 9 plays, 88 yards, 4:39.**

**Second quarter**

- KC – Tyreek Hill 10-yard run (Harrison Butker kick), 14:29. Chiefs 14–3. **Drive: 4 plays, 28 yards, 1:05.**
- LV – Nelson Agholor 59-yard pass from Derek Carr (Daniel Carlson kick), 11:48. Chiefs 14–10. **Drive: 5 plays, 75 yards, 2:41.**
- KC – Sammy Watkins 8-yard pass from Patrick Mahomes (Harrison Butker kick), 9:04. Chiefs 21–10. **Drive: 7 plays, 75 yards, 2:44.**
- LV – Darren Waller 5-yard pass from Derek Carr (Daniel Carlson kick), 6:24. Chiefs 21–17. **Drive: 5 plays, 75 yards, 2:40.**
- LV – Henry Ruggs 72-yard pass from Derek Carr (Daniel Carlson kick), 2:39. Raiders 24–21. **Drive: 3 plays, 80 yards, 1:37.**
- KC – Harrison Butker 32-yard field goal, 0:31. Tied 24–24. **Drive: 12 plays, 58 yards, 2:11.**

**Third quarter**

- No scoring plays.

**Fourth quarter**

- LV – Josh Jacobs 7-yard run (kick failed, wide left), 14:14. Raiders 30–24. **Drive: 13 plays, 71 yards, 8:00.**
- LV – Daniel Carlson 43-yard field goal, 6:39. Raiders 33–24. **Drive: 10 plays, 45 yards, 5:11.**
- LV – Josh Jacobs 2-yard run (Daniel Carlson kick), 5:26. Raiders 40–24. **Drive: 1 play, 2 yards, 0:05.**
- KC – Travis Kelce 7-yard pass from Patrick Mahomes (Patrick Mahomes–Darrel Williams pass), 3:57. Raiders 40–32. **Drive: 8 plays, 75 yards, 1:29.**

**Top passers**

- LV – Derek Carr – 22/31, 347 yards, 3 TD, INT
- KC – Patrick Mahomes – 22/43, 340 yards, 2 TD, INT

**Top rushers**

- LV – Josh Jacobs – 23 rushes, 77 yards, 2 TD
- KC – Clyde Edwards-Helaire – 10 rushes, 40 yards

**Top receivers**

- LV – Henry Ruggs – 2 receptions, 118 yards, TD
- KC – Travis Kelce – 8 receptions, 108 yards, TD

==== Week 6: at Buffalo Bills ====
Week 6: Kansas City Chiefs at Buffalo Bills – Game summary

Quarter	1	2	3	4	Total
**Chiefs**	7	6	7	6	**26**
Bills	3	7	0	7	**17**

at Bills Stadium, Orchard Park, New York

- Date: October 19
- Game time: 5:00 p.m. EDT/4:00 p.m. CDT
- Game weather: Cloudy with showers, 51 °F (11 °C)
- Game attendance: 0
- Referee: Ronald Torbert
- TV announcers (Fox/NFLN/Amazon Prime Video): Joe Buck, Troy Aikman, Erin Andrews and Kristina Pink
- Recap, Game Book

Game information

**First quarter**

- BUF – Tyler Bass 48-yard field goal, 5:42. Bills 3–0. **Drive: 11 plays, 38 yards, 4:27.**
- KC – Travis Kelce 11-yard pass from Patrick Mahomes (Harrison Butker kick), 3:05. Chiefs 7–3. **Drive: 5 plays, 75 yards, 2:37.**

**Second quarter**

- BUF – Stefon Diggs 4-yard pass from Josh Allen (Tyler Bass kick), 11:22. Bills 10–7. **Drive: 13 plays, 75 yards, 6:43.**
- KC – Travis Kelce 12-yard pass from Patrick Mahomes (kick failed, wide right), 4:56. Chiefs 13–10. **Drive: 12 plays, 75 yards, 6:26.**

**Third quarter**

- KC – Darrel Williams 13-yard run (Harrison Butker kick), 1:18. Chiefs 20–10. **Drive: 13 plays, 82 yards, 7:47.**

**Fourth quarter**

- KC – Harrison Butker 37-yard field goal, 9:07. Chiefs 23–10. **Drive: 10 plays, 75 yards, 5:20.**
- BUF – Cole Beasley 8-yard pass from Josh Allen (Tyler Bass kick), 6:34. Chiefs 23–17. **Drive: 6 plays, 75 yards, 2:33.**
- KC – Harrison Butker 30-yard field goal, 1:56. Chiefs 26–17. **Drive: 12 plays, 75 yards, 4:38.**

**Top passers**

- KC – Patrick Mahomes – 21/26, 225 yards, 2 TD
- BUF – Josh Allen – 14/27, 122 yards, 2 TD, INT

**Top rushers**

- KC – Clyde Edwards-Helaire – 26 rushes, 161 yards
- BUF – Josh Allen – 8 rushes, 42 yards

**Top receivers**

- KC – Demarcus Robinson – 5 receptions, 69 yards
- BUF – Stefon Diggs – 6 receptions, 46 yards, TD

==== Week 7: at Denver Broncos ====
Week 7: Kansas City Chiefs at Denver Broncos – Game summary

Quarter	1	2	3	4	Total
**Chiefs**	10	14	6	13	**43**
Broncos	6	3	0	7	**16**

at Empower Field at Mile High, Denver, Colorado

- Date: October 25
- Game time: 3:25 p.m. CDT/2:25 p.m. MDT
- Game weather: Light snow/fog, 14 °F (−10 °C)
- Game attendance: 5,314
- Referee: Brad Rogers
- TV announcers (CBS): Kevin Harlan, Jay Feely and Melanie Collins
- Recap, Game Book

Game information

**First quarter**

- KC – Clyde Edwards-Helaire 11-yard run (Harrison Butker kick), 9:08. Chiefs 7–0. **Drive: 8 plays, 68 yards, 4:02.**
- DEN – Drew Lock 2-yard run (kick failed, wide left), 6:04. Chiefs 7–6. **Drive: 4 plays, 37 yards, 1:46.**
- KC – Harrison Butker 40-yard field goal, 2:04. Chiefs 10–6. **Drive: 7 plays, 53 yards, 4:00.**

**Second quarter**

- KC – Daniel Sorensen 50-yard interception return (Harrison Butker kick), 9:18. Chiefs 17–6.
- DEN – Brandon McManus 43-yard field goal, 5:49. Chiefs 17–9. **Drive: 7 plays, 50 yards, 3:29.**
- KC – Byron Pringle 102-yard kickoff return (Harrison Butker kick), 5:35. Chiefs 24–9.

**Third quarter**

- KC – Harrison Butker 31-yard field goal, 10:21. Chiefs 27–9. **Drive: 4 plays, 1 yard, 1:03.**
- KC – Harrison Butker 26-yard field goal, 2:00. Chiefs 30–9. **Drive: 8 plays, 50 yards, 3:49.**

**Fourth quarter**

- KC – Tyreek Hill 10-yard pass from Patrick Mahomes (Harrison Butker kick), 11:15. Chiefs 37–9. **Drive: 6 plays, 57 yards, 3:33.**
- DEN – Melvin Gordon 3-yard run (Brandon McManus kick), 6:54. Chiefs 37–16. **Drive: 9 plays, 75 yards, 4:21.**
- KC – Chad Henne 1-yard run (kick failed, hit left upright), 2:58. Chiefs 43–16. **Drive: 7 plays, 21 yards, 3:56.**

**Top passers**

- KC – Patrick Mahomes – 15/23, 200 yards, TD
- DEN – Drew Lock – 24/40, 254 yards, 2 INT

**Top rushers**

- KC – Clyde Edwards-Helaire – 8 rushes, 46 yards, TD
- DEN – Phillip Lindsay – 9 rushes, 79 yards

**Top receivers**

- KC – Mecole Hardman – 2 receptions, 57 yards
- DEN – Albert Okwuegbunam – 7 receptions, 60 yards

==== Week 8: vs. New York Jets ====
Week 8: New York Jets at Kansas City Chiefs – Game summary

Quarter	1	2	3	4	Total
Jets	3	6	0	0	**9**
**Chiefs**	14	7	7	7	**35**

at Arrowhead Stadium, Kansas City, Missouri

- Date: November 1
- Game time: 12:00 p.m. CST
- Game weather: Sunny, 52 °F (11 °C)
- Game attendance: 11,932
- Referee: Land Clark
- TV announcers (CBS): Kevin Harlan, Trent Green and Melanie Collins
- Recap, Game Book

Game information

**First quarter**

- KC – Mecole Hardman 30-yard pass from Patrick Mahomes (Harrison Butker kick), 11:08. Chiefs 7–0. **Drive: 7 plays, 90 yards, 3:52.**
- NYJ – Sergio Castillo 39-yard field goal, 4:39. Chiefs 7–3. **Drive: 12 plays, 54 yards, 6:29.**
- KC – Tyreek Hill 36-yard pass from Patrick Mahomes (Harrison Butker kick), 1:17. Chiefs 14–3. **Drive: 7 plays, 73 yards, 3:22.**

**Second quarter**

- NYJ – Sergio Castillo 55-yard field goal, 13:02. Chiefs 14–6. **Drive: 7 plays, 38 yards, 3:15.**
- NYJ – Sergio Castillo 48-yard field goal, 2:55. Chiefs 14–9. **Drive: 13 plays, 51 yards, 7:02.**
- KC – Travis Kelce 3-yard pass from Patrick Mahomes (Harrison Butker kick), 0:58. Chiefs 21–9. **Drive: 7 plays, 76 yards, 1:57.**

**Third quarter**

- KC – Demarcus Robinson 26-yard pass from Patrick Mahomes (Harrison Butker kick), 2:15. Chiefs 28–9. **Drive: 6 plays, 83 yards, 3:21.**

**Fourth quarter**

- KC – Tyreek Hill 41-yard pass from Patrick Mahomes (Harrison Butker kick), 10:58. Chiefs 35–9. **Drive: 6 plays, 65 yards, 2:10.**

**Top passers**

- NYJ – Sam Darnold – 18/30, 133 yards
- KC – Patrick Mahomes – 31/42, 416 yards, 5 TD

**Top rushers**

- NYJ – Frank Gore – 10 rushes, 30 yards
- KC – Clyde Edwards-Helaire – 6 rushes, 21 yards

**Top receivers**

- NYJ – Denzel Mims – 2 receptions, 42 yards
- KC – Travis Kelce – 8 receptions, 109 yards, TD

==== Week 9: vs. Carolina Panthers ====
Week 9: Carolina Panthers at Kansas City Chiefs – Game summary

Quarter	1	2	3	4	Total
Panthers	7	10	0	14	**31**
**Chiefs**	3	10	7	13	**33**

at Arrowhead Stadium, Kansas City, Missouri

- Date: November 8
- Game time: 12:00 p.m. CST
- Game weather: Cloudy, 71 °F (22 °C)
- Game attendance: 12,073
- Referee: Clay Martin
- TV announcers (Fox): Kevin Burkhardt, Daryl Johnston and Pam Oliver
- Recap, Game Book

Game information

**First quarter**

- CAR – Christian McCaffrey 9-yard pass from Teddy Bridgewater (Joey Slye kick), 6:07. Panthers 7–0. **Drive: 15 plays, 17 yards, 8:53.**
- KC – Harrison Butker 39-yard field goal, 1:38. Panthers 7–3. **Drive: 12 plays, 54 yards, 4:29.**

**Second quarter**

- CAR – Curtis Samuel 14-yard pass from Teddy Bridgewater (Joey Slye kick), 12:39. Panthers 14–3. **Drive: 9 plays, 74 yards, 3:59.**
- KC – Harrison Butker 55-yard field goal, 11:01. Panthers 14–6. **Drive: 6 plays, 38 yards, 1:38.**
- KC – Demarcus Robinson 1-yard pass from Patrick Mahomes (Harrison Butker kick), 3:45. Panthers 14–13. **Drive: 7 plays, 65 yards, 3:44.**
- CAR – Joey Slye 47-yard field goal, 0:46. Panthers 17–13. **Drive: 9 plays, 50 yards, 2:59.**

**Third quarter**

- KC – Clyde Edwards-Helaire 4-yard pass from Patrick Mahomes (Harrison Butker kick), 4:42. Chiefs 20–17. **Drive: 5 plays, 59 yards, 2:17.**

**Fourth quarter**

- KC – Tyreek Hill 28-yard pass from Patrick Mahomes (kick failed, hit left upright), 14:23. Chiefs 26–17. **Drive: 6 plays, 69 yards, 1:56.**
- CAR – Teddy Bridgewater 4-yard run (Joey Slye kick), 10:22. Chiefs 26–24. **Drive: 9 plays, 70 yards, 4:01.**
- KC – Tyreek Hill 2-yard pass from Patrick Mahomes (Harrison Butker kick), 7:40. Chiefs 33–24. **Drive: 7 plays, 39 yards, 2:42.**
- CAR – Christian McCaffrey 1-yard run (Joey Slye kick), 1:53. Chiefs 33–31. **Drive: 11 plays, 75 yards, 5:47.**

**Top passers**

- CAR – Teddy Bridgewater – 36/49, 310 yards, 2 TD
- KC – Patrick Mahomes – 30/45, 372 yards, 4 TD

**Top rushers**

- CAR – Christian McCaffrey – 18 rushes, 69 yards, TD
- KC – Clyde Edwards-Helaire – 5 rushes, 14 yards

**Top receivers**

- CAR – Curtis Samuel – 9 receptions, 105 yards, TD
- KC – Travis Kelce – 10 receptions, 159 yards

==== Week 11: at Las Vegas Raiders ====
Week 11: Kansas City Chiefs at Las Vegas Raiders – Game summary

Quarter	1	2	3	4	Total
**Chiefs**	7	7	7	14	**35**
Raiders	14	3	0	14	**31**

at Allegiant Stadium, Paradise, Nevada

- Date: November 22
- Game time: 7:20 p.m. CST/5:20 p.m. PST
- Game weather: None (indoor stadium)
- Game attendance: 0
- Referee: Carl Cheffers
- TV announcers (NBC): Al Michaels, Cris Collinsworth and Michele Tafoya
- Recap, Game Book

Game information

**First quarter**

- LV – Josh Jacobs 2-yard run (Daniel Carlson kick), 11:25. Raiders 7–0. **Drive: 6 plays, 75 yards, 3:35.**
- KC – Tyreek Hill 3-yard pass from Patrick Mahomes (Harrison Butker kick), 4:06. Tied 7–7. **Drive: 14 plays, 85 yards, 7:24.**
- LV – Nelson Agholor 17-yard pass from Derek Carr (Daniel Carlson kick), 0:00. Raiders 14–7. **Drive: 7 plays, 60 yards, 4:01.**

**Second quarter**

- KC – Clyde Edwards-Helaire 3-yard run (Harrison Butker kick), 11:16. Tied 14–14. **Drive: 7 plays, 73 yards, 3:44.**
- LV – Daniel Carlson 35-yard field goal, 4:36. Raiders 17–14. **Drive: 12 plays, 59 yards, 6:40.**

**Third quarter**

- KC – Clyde Edwards-Helaire 14-yard run (Harrison Butker kick), 6:23. Chiefs 21–17. **Drive: 16 plays, 93 yards, 8:37.**

**Fourth quarter**

- LV – Darren Waller 3-yard pass from Derek Carr (Daniel Carlson kick), 14:54. Raiders 24–21. **Drive: 11 plays, 75 yards, 6:29.**
- KC – Le'Veon Bell 6-yard run (Harrison Butker kick), 5:54. Chiefs 28–24. **Drive: 12 plays, 91 yards, 5:39.**
- LV – Jason Witten 1-yard pass from Derek Carr (Daniel Carlson kick), 1:43. Raiders 31–28. **Drive: 12 plays, 75 yards, 4:11.**
- KC – Travis Kelce 35-yard pass from Patrick Mahomes (Harrison Butker kick), 0:28. Chiefs 35–31. **Drive: 7 plays, 75 yards, 1:15.**

**Top passers**

- KC – Patrick Mahomes – 34/45, 348 yards, 2 TD, INT
- LV – Derek Carr – 23/31, 275 yards, 3 TD, INT

**Top rushers**

- KC – Clyde Edwards-Helaire – 14 rushes, 69 yards, 2 TD
- LV – Josh Jacobs – 17 rushes, 55 yards, TD

**Top receivers**

- KC – Travis Kelce – 8 receptions, 127 yards, TD
- LV – Darren Waller – 7 receptions, 88 yards, TD

==== Week 12: at Tampa Bay Buccaneers ====
Week 12: Kansas City Chiefs at Tampa Bay Buccaneers – Game summary

Quarter	1	2	3	4	Total
**Chiefs**	17	3	7	0	**27**
Buccaneers	0	7	3	14	**24**

at Raymond James Stadium, Tampa, Florida

- Date: November 29
- Game time: 4:25 p.m. EST/3:25 p.m. CST
- Game weather: Clear, 81 °F (27 °C)
- Game attendance: 15,950
- Referee: Shawn Hochuli
- TV announcers (CBS): Jim Nantz, Tony Romo and Tracy Wolfson
- Recap, Game Book

Game information

**First quarter**

- KC – Harrison Butker 19-yard field goal, 12:14. Chiefs 3–0. **Drive: 8 plays, 74 yards, 2:46.**
- KC – Tyreek Hill 75-yard pass from Patrick Mahomes (Harrison Butker kick), 6:49. Chiefs 10–0. **Drive: 1 play, 75 yards, 0:10.**
- KC – Tyreek Hill 44-yard pass from Patrick Mahomes (Harrison Butker kick), 1:32. Chiefs 17–0. **Drive: 7 plays, 90 yards, 3:50.**

**Second quarter**

- TB – Ronald Jones II 37-yard pass from Tom Brady (Ryan Succop kick), 4:29. Chiefs 17–7. **Drive: 7 plays, 86 yards, 4:09.**
- KC – Harrison Butker 29-yard field goal, 0:14. Chiefs 20–7. **Drive: 13 plays, 64 yards, 4:15.**

**Third quarter**

- TB – Ryan Succop 26-yard field goal, 11:04. Chiefs 20–10. **Drive: 8 plays, 67 yards, 3:56.**
- KC – Tyreek Hill 20-yard pass from Patrick Mahomes (Harrison Butker kick), 7:00. Chiefs 27–10. **Drive: 7 plays, 75 yards, 4:04.**

**Fourth quarter**

- TB – Mike Evans 31-yard pass from Tom Brady (Ryan Succop kick), 12:44. Chiefs 27–17. **Drive: 8 plays, 75 yards, 2:29.**
- TB – Mike Evans 7-yard pass from Tom Brady (Ryan Succop kick), 4:10. Chiefs 27–24. **Drive: 10 plays, 73 yards, 2:11.**

**Top passers**

- KC – Patrick Mahomes – 37/49, 462 yards, 3 TD
- TB – Tom Brady – 27/41, 345 yards, 3 TD, 2 INT

**Top rushers**

- KC – Clyde Edwards-Helaire – 11 rushes, 37 yards
- TB – Ronald Jones II – 9 rushes, 66 yards

**Top receivers**

- KC – Tyreek Hill – 13 receptions, 269 yards, 3 TD
- TB – Rob Gronkowski – 6 receptions, 106 yards

==== Week 13: vs. Denver Broncos ====
Week 13: Denver Broncos at Kansas City Chiefs – Game summary

Quarter	1	2	3	4	Total
Broncos	3	7	6	0	**16**
**Chiefs**	3	6	10	3	**22**

at Arrowhead Stadium, Kansas City, Missouri

- Date: December 6
- Game time: 7:20 p.m. CST
- Game weather: Clear, 41 °F (5 °C)
- Game attendance: 12,578
- Referee: Alex Kemp
- TV announcers (NBC): Al Michaels, Cris Collinsworth and Michele Tafoya
- Recap, Game Book

Game information

**First quarter**

- DEN – Brandon McManus 53-yard field goal, 3:58. Broncos 3–0. **Drive: 12 plays, 42 yards, 5:50.**
- KC – Harrison Butker 35-yard field goal, 0:20. Tied 3–3. **Drive: 7 plays, 58 yards, 7:58.**

**Second quarter**

- DEN – Tim Patrick 5-yard pass from Drew Lock (Brandon McManus kick), 6:26. Broncos 10–3. **Drive: 7 plays, 90 yards, 4:11.**
- KC – Harrison Butker 24-yard field goal, 2:42. Broncos 10–6. **Drive: 7 plays, 69 yards, 3:44.**
- KC – Harrison Butker 23-yard field goal, 0:00. Broncos 10–9. **Drive: 5 plays, 48 yards, 0:28.**

**Third quarter**

- KC – Harrison Butker 31-yard field goal, 10:32. Chiefs 12–10. **Drive: 10 plays, 62 yards, 4:28.**
- DEN – Tim Patrick 10-yard pass from Drew Lock (pass failed), 3:50. Broncos 16–12. **Drive: 11 plays, 72 yards, 6:42.**
- KC – Travis Kelce 20-yard pass from Patrick Mahomes (Harrison Butker kick), 1:06. Chiefs 19–16. **Drive: 7 plays, 75 yards, 2:44.**

**Fourth quarter**

- KC – Harrison Butker 48-yard field goal, 1:04. Chiefs 22–16. **Drive: 10 plays, 55 yards, 5:03.**

**Top passers**

- DEN – Drew Lock – 15/28, 151 yards, 2 TD, 2 INT
- KC – Patrick Mahomes – 25/40, 318 yards, TD

**Top rushers**

- DEN – Melvin Gordon – 15 rushes, 131 yards
- KC – LeVeon Bell – 11 rushes, 40 yards

**Top receivers**

- DEN – Noah Fant – 4 receptions, 57 yards
- KC – Travis Kelce – 8 receptions, 136 yards, TD

==== Week 14: at Miami Dolphins ====
Week 14: Kansas City Chiefs at Miami Dolphins – Game summary

Quarter	1	2	3	4	Total
**Chiefs**	0	14	16	3	**33**
Dolphins	7	3	0	17	**27**

at Hard Rock Stadium, Miami Gardens, Florida

- Date: December 13
- Game time: 1:00 p.m. EST/12:00 p.m. CST
- Game weather: Sunny, 81 °F (27 °C)
- Game attendance: 13,057
- Referee: Clay Martin
- TV announcers (CBS): Jim Nantz, Tony Romo and Tracy Wolfson
- Recap, Game Book

Game information

**First quarter**

- MIA – Mike Gesicki 7-yard pass from Tua Tagovailoa (Jason Sanders kick), 1:35. Dolphins 7–0. **Drive: 7 plays, 44 yards, 3:15.**

**Second quarter**

- MIA – Jason Sanders 31-yard field goal, 10:14. Dolphins 10–0. **Drive: 10 plays, 34 yards, 5:23.**
- KC – Tyreek Hill 32-yard run (Harrison Butker kick), 8:10. Dolphins 10–7. **Drive: 4 plays, 75 yards, 2:04.**
- KC – Travis Kelce 6-yard pass from Patrick Mahomes (Harrison Butker kick), 0:37. Chiefs 14–10. **Drive: 9 plays, 74 yards, 2:15.**

**Third quarter**

- KC – Tyreek Hill 44-yard pass from Patrick Mahomes (Harrison Butker kick), 13:50. Chiefs 21–10. **Drive: 3 plays, 75 yards, 1:10.**
- KC – Mecole Hardman 67-yard punt return (Harrison Butker kick), 12:38. Chiefs 28–10.
- KC – Tua Tagovailoa sacked in end zone by Chris Jones for a Safety, 6:52. Chiefs 30–10.

**Fourth quarter**

- MIA – Mike Gesicki 29-yard pass from Tua Tagovailoa (Jason Sanders kick), 12:03. Chiefs 30–17. **Drive: 6 plays, 80 yards, 2:16.**
- MIA – Tua Tagovailoa 1-yard run (Jason Sanders kick), 4:15. Chiefs 30–24. **Drive: 14 plays, 75 yards, 5:52.**
- KC – Harrison Butker 46-yard field goal, 1:08. Chiefs 33–24. **Drive: 10 plays, 47 yards, 3:07.**
- MIA – Jason Sanders 44-yard field goal, 0:16. Chiefs 33–27. **Drive: 5 plays, 49 yards, 0:52.**

**Top passers**

- KC – Patrick Mahomes – 24/34, 393 yards, 2 TD, 3 INT
- MIA – Tua Tagovailoa – 28/48, 316 yards, 2 TD, INT

**Top rushers**

- KC – Tyreek Hill – 1 rush, 32 yards, TD
- MIA – DeAndre Washington – 13 rushes, 35 yards

**Top receivers**

- KC – Travis Kelce – 8 receptions, 136 yards, TD
- MIA – Lynn Bowden – 7 receptions, 82 yards

==== Week 15: at New Orleans Saints ====
Week 15: Kansas City Chiefs at New Orleans Saints – Game summary

Quarter	1	2	3	4	Total
**Chiefs**	7	7	7	11	**32**
Saints	0	9	6	14	**29**

at Mercedes-Benz Superdome, New Orleans, Louisiana

- Date: December 20
- Game time: 3:25 p.m. CST
- Game weather: None (indoor stadium)
- Game attendance: 3,000
- Referee: Scott Novak
- TV announcers (CBS): Jim Nantz, Tony Romo and Tracy Wolfson
- Recap, Game Book

Game information

**First quarter**

- KC – Tyreek Hill 5-yard pass from Patrick Mahomes (Harrison Butker kick), 6:18. Chiefs 7–0. **Drive: 7 plays, 36 yards, 3:15.**

**Second quarter**

- KC – Travis Kelce 1-yard pass from Patrick Mahomes (Harrison Butker kick), 14:58. Chiefs 14–0. **Drive: 11 plays, 80 yards, 5:01.**
- NO – Taysom Hill 1-yard run (Wil Lutz kick), 10:21. Chiefs 14–7. **Drive: 7 plays, 66 yards, 2:40.**
- NO – Demarcus Robinson fumble forced by Craig Robertson out of bounds in end zone for a Safety, 0:03. Chiefs 14–9.

**Third quarter**

- NO – Latavius Murray 24-yard pass from Drew Brees (pass failed), 13:16. Saints 15–14. **Drive: 4 plays, 75 yards, 1:44.**
- KC – Mecole Hardman 5-yard pass from Patrick Mahomes (Harrison Butker kick), 8:23. Chiefs 21–15. **Drive: 9 plays, 75 yards, 4:53.**

**Fourth quarter**

- KC – LeVeon Bell 12-yard run (Patrick Mahomes–Travis Kelce pass), 13:44. Chiefs 29–15. **Drive: 10 plays, 59 yards, 4:44.**
- NO – Alvin Kamara 14-yard pass from Drew Brees (Wil Lutz kick), 9:43. Chiefs 29–22. **Drive: 3 plays, 25 yards, 1:13.**
- KC – Harrison Butker 22-yard field goal, 4:18. Chiefs 32–22. **Drive: 10 plays, 71 yards, 5:25.**
- NO – Lil'Jordan Humphrey 17-yard pass from Drew Brees (Wil Lutz kick), 2:06. Chiefs 32–29. **Drive: 8 plays, 75 yards, 2:12.**

**Top passers**

- KC – Patrick Mahomes – 26/47, 254 yards, 3 TD
- NO – Drew Brees – 15/34, 234 yards, 3 TD, INT

**Top rushers**

- KC – Clyde Edwards-Helaire – 14 rushes, 79 yards
- NO – Alvin Kamara – 11 rushes, 54 yards

**Top receivers**

- KC – Travis Kelce – 8 receptions, 68 yards, TD
- NO – Emmanuel Sanders – 4 receptions, 76 yards

==== Week 16: vs. Atlanta Falcons ====
Week 16: Atlanta Falcons at Kansas City Chiefs – Game summary

Quarter	1	2	3	4	Total
Falcons	0	7	0	7	**14**
**Chiefs**	0	7	0	10	**17**

at Arrowhead Stadium, Kansas City, Missouri

- Date: December 27
- Game time: 12:00 p.m. CST
- Game weather: 49 °F (9 °C)
- Game attendance: 13,470
- Referee: Craig Wrolstad
- TV announcers (Fox): Kevin Burkhardt, Daryl Johnston and Pam Oliver
- Recap, Game Book

Game information

**First quarter**

- No scoring plays.

**Second quarter**

- ATL – Hayden Hurst 5-yard pass from Matt Ryan (Younghoe Koo kick), 3:35. Falcons 7–0. **Drive: 9 plays, 98 yards, 5:09.**
- KC – Travis Kelce 4-yard pass from Patrick Mahomes (Harrison Butker kick), 0:30. Tied 7–7. **Drive: 12 plays, 78 yards, 3:05.**

**Third quarter**

- No scoring plays.

**Fourth quarter**

- KC – Harrison Butker 53-yard field goal, 14:08. Chiefs 10–7. **Drive: 7 plays, 28 yards, 2:31.**
- ATL – Laquon Treadwell 5-yard pass from Matt Ryan (Younghoe Koo kick), 4:33. Falcons 14–10. **Drive: 8 plays, 75 yards, 3:25.**
- KC – Demarcus Robinson 25-yard pass from Patrick Mahomes (Harrison Butker kick), 1:55. Chiefs 17–14. **Drive: 9 plays, 75 yards, 2:38.**

**Top passers**

- ATL – Matt Ryan – 27/35, 300 yards, 2 TD
- KC – Patrick Mahomes – 24/44, 278 yards, 2 TD, INT

**Top rushers**

- ATL – Ito Smith – 10 rushes, 46 yards
- KC – Darrel Williams – 10 rushes, 46 yards

**Top receivers**

- ATL – Calvin Ridley – 5 receptions, 130 yards
- KC – Travis Kelce – 7 receptions, 98 yards, TD

==== Week 17: vs. Los Angeles Chargers ====
Week 17: Los Angeles Chargers at Kansas City Chiefs – Game summary

Quarter	1	2	3	4	Total
**Chargers**	7	17	7	7	**38**
Chiefs	7	7	0	7	**21**

at Arrowhead Stadium, Kansas City, Missouri

- Date: January 3, 2021
- Game time: 3:25 p.m. CST
- Game weather: Cloudy, 35 °F (2 °C)
- Game attendance: 13,240
- Referee: Clete Blakeman
- TV announcers (Fox): Kevin Kugler, Brock Huard and Laura Okmin
- Recap, Game Book

Game information

**First quarter**

- KC – Byron Pringle 3-yard pass from Chad Henne (Harrison Butker kick), 11:19. Chiefs 7–0. **Drive: 7 plays, 56 yards, 3:41.**
- LAC – Donald Parham 8-yard pass from Justin Herbert (Michael Badgley kick), 4:23. Tied 7–7. **Drive: 12 plays, 75 yards, 6:56.**

**Second quarter**

- KC – Darwin Thompson 1-yard run (Harrison Butker kick), 13:41. Chiefs 14–7. **Drive: 12 plays, 72 yards, 5:42.**
- LAC – Austin Ekeler 4-yard pass from Justin Herbert (Michael Badgley kick), 9:51. Tied 14–14. **Drive: 4 plays, 17 yards, 2:06.**
- LAC – Chad Henne sacked in end zone by Isaac Rochell for a Safety, 1:43. Chargers 16–14.
- LAC – Justin Herbert 1-yard run (Justin Herbert–Justin Jackson pass), 0:16. Chargers 24–14. **Drive: 5 plays, 59 yards, 1:27.**

**Third quarter**

- LAC – Mike Williams 48-yard pass from Justin Herbert (Michael Badgley kick), 0:47. Chargers 31–14. **Drive: 6 plays, 70 yards, 3:17.**

**Fourth quarter**

- KC – Darwin Thompson 8-yard pass from Chad Henne (Harrison Butker kick), 11:49. Chargers 31–21. **Drive: 9 plays, 74 yards, 3:58.**
- LAC – Kalen Ballage 1-yard run (Michael Badgley kick), 8:09. Chargers 38–21. **Drive: 6 plays, 77 yards, 3:40.**

**Top passers**

- LAC – Justin Herbert – 22/31, 302 yards, 3 TD
- KC – Chad Henne – 23/32, 218 yards, 2 TD

**Top rushers**

- LAC – Justin Jackson – 9 rushes, 72 yards
- KC – Darwin Thompson – 14 rushes, 45 yards, TD

**Top receivers**

- LAC – Mike Williams – 6 receptions, 108 yards, TD
- KC – Darwin Thompson – 7 receptions, 65 yards, TD

=== Standings ===
==== Division ====
AFC West
	W	L	T	PCT	DIV	CONF	PF	PA	STK
^{(1)} Kansas City Chiefs	14	2	0	.875	4–2	10–2	473	362	L1
Las Vegas Raiders	8	8	0	.500	4–2	6–6	434	478	W1
Los Angeles Chargers	7	9	0	.438	3–3	6–6	384	426	W4
Denver Broncos	5	11	0	.313	1–5	4–8	323	446	L3

==== Conference ====
AFC
#	Team	Division	W	L	T	PCT	DIV	CONF	SOS	SOV	STK
**Division leaders**
1	Kansas City Chiefs	West	14	2	0	.875	4–2	10–2	.465	.464	L1
2	Buffalo Bills	East	13	3	0	.813	6–0	10–2	.512	.471	W6
3	Pittsburgh Steelers	North	12	4	0	.750	4–2	9–3	.475	.448	L1
4 (Note: Tennessee finished ahead of Indianapolis in the AFC South based on division record.)	Tennessee Titans	South	11	5	0	.688	5–1	8–4	.475	.398	W1
**Wild cards**
5 (Note: Baltimore claimed the No. 5 seed over Indianapolis based on head-to-head victory. Division tiebreaker used to eliminate Cleveland (see below).) (Note: Baltimore claimed the No. 5 seed over Cleveland based on head-to-head sweep.)	Baltimore Ravens	North	11	5	0	.688	4–2	7–5	.494	.401	W5
6 (Note: Cleveland claimed the No. 6 seed over Indianapolis based on head-to-head victory.)	Cleveland Browns	North	11	5	0	.688	3–3	7–5	.451	.406	W1
7	Indianapolis Colts	South	11	5	0	.688	4–2	7–5	.443	.384	W1
**Did not qualify for the postseason**
8	Miami Dolphins	East	10	6	0	.625	3–3	7–5	.467	.347	L1
9	Las Vegas Raiders	West	8	8	0	.500	4–2	6–6	.539	.477	W1
10 (Note: New England finished ahead of the LA Chargers based on head-to-head victory.)	New England Patriots	East	7	9	0	.438	3–3	6–6	.527	.429	W1
11	Los Angeles Chargers	West	7	9	0	.438	3–3	6–6	.482	.344	W4
12	Denver Broncos	West	5	11	0	.313	1–5	4–8	.566	.388	L3
13	Cincinnati Bengals	North	4	11	1	.281	1–5	4–8	.529	.438	L1
14	Houston Texans	South	4	12	0	.250	2–4	3–9	.541	.219	L5
15	New York Jets	East	2	14	0	.125	0–6	1–11	.594	.656	L1
16	Jacksonville Jaguars	South	1	15	0	.063	1–5	1–11	.549	.688	L15
**Tiebreakers** (Note: When breaking ties for three or more teams under the NFL's rules, they are first broken within divisions, then comparing only the highest ranked remaining team from each division.)

== Postseason ==
=== Schedule ===
Round	Date	Opponent (seed)	Result	Record	Venue	Recap
Wild Card	First-round bye					
Divisional	January 17	Cleveland Browns (6)	W 22–17	1–0	Arrowhead Stadium	Recap
AFC Championship	January 24	Buffalo Bills (2)	W 38–24	2–0	Arrowhead Stadium	Recap
Super Bowl LV	February 7	at Tampa Bay Buccaneers (N5)	L 9–31	2–1	Raymond James Stadium	Recap

=== Game summaries ===
==== AFC Divisional Playoffs: vs. (6) Cleveland Browns ====
AFC Divisional Playoffs: (6) Cleveland Browns at (1) Kansas City Chiefs – Game summary

Quarter	1	2	3	4	Total
Browns	3	0	7	7	17
Chiefs	6	13	3	0	22

at Arrowhead Stadium, Kansas City, Missouri

- Date: January 17, 2021
- Game time: 2:05 p.m. CST
- Game weather: Cloudy, 40 °F (4 °C)
- Game attendance: 16,730
- Referee: Clay Martin
- TV announcers (CBS): Jim Nantz, Tony Romo, Tracy Wolfson, Evan Washburn and Jay Feely
- Recap, Game Book

Game information

First quarter

- KC – Patrick Mahomes 1-yard run (kick failed, wide left), 9:11. Chiefs 6–0. Drive: 10 plays, 75 yards, 5:49.
- CLE – Cody Parkey 46-yard field goal, 2:41. Chiefs 6–3. Drive: 12 plays, 47 yards, 6:30.

Second quarter

- KC – Travis Kelce 20-yard pass from Patrick Mahomes (Harrison Butker kick), 13:48. Chiefs 13–3. Drive: 7 plays, 75 yards, 3:53.
- KC – Harrison Butker 50-yard field goal, 3:09. Chiefs 16–3. Drive: 13 plays, 53 yards, 6:29.
- KC – Harrison Butker 28-yard field goal, 0:02. Chiefs 19–3. Drive: 9 plays, 70 yards, 1:32.

Third quarter

- CLE – Jarvis Landry 4-yard pass from Baker Mayfield (Cody Parkey kick), 9:29. Chiefs 19–10. Drive: 8 plays, 77 yards, 4:38.
- KC – Harrison Butker 33-yard field goal, 4:24. Chiefs 22–10. Drive: 11 plays, 60 yards, 5:05.

Fourth quarter

- CLE – Kareem Hunt 3-yard run (Cody Parkey kick), 11:07. Chiefs 22–17. Drive: 18 plays, 75 yards, 8:17.

Top passers

- CLE – Baker Mayfield – 23/37, 204 yards, TD, INT
- KC – Patrick Mahomes – 21/30, 255 yards, TD

Top rushers

- CLE – Nick Chubb – 13 carries, 69 yards
- KC – Darrel Williams – 13 carries, 78 yards

Top receivers

- CLE – Rashard Higgins – 5 receptions, 88 yards
- KC – Tyreek Hill – 8 receptions, 110 yards

==== AFC Championship: vs. (2) Buffalo Bills ====
AFC Championship: (2) Buffalo Bills at (1) Kansas City Chiefs – Game summary

Quarter	1	2	3	4	Total
Bills	9	3	3	9	24
Chiefs	0	21	10	7	38

at Arrowhead Stadium, Kansas City, Missouri

- Date: January 24, 2021
- Game time: 5:40 p.m. CST
- Game weather: Cloudy, 40 °F (4 °C)
- Game attendance: 16,993
- Referee: Bill Vinovich
- TV announcers (CBS): Jim Nantz, Tony Romo, Tracy Wolfson, Evan Washburn and Jay Feely
- Recap, Game Book

Game information

First quarter

- BUF – Tyler Bass 51-yard field goal, 11:32. Bills 3–0. Drive: 10 plays, 42 yards, 3:28.
- BUF – Dawson Knox 3-yard pass from Josh Allen (kick failed, hit right upright), 6:14. Bills 9–0. Drive: 1 play, 3 yards, 0:05.

Second quarter

- KC – Mecole Hardman 3-yard pass from Patrick Mahomes (Harrison Butker kick), 14:16. Bills 9–7. Drive: 14 plays, 80 yards, 6:58.
- KC – Darrel Williams 6-yard run (Harrison Butker kick), 9:35. Chiefs 14–9. Drive: 5 plays, 82 yards, 2:51.
- KC – Clyde Edwards-Helaire 1-yard run (Harrison Butker kick), 4:12. Chiefs 21–9. Drive: 9 plays, 77 yards, 4:19.
- BUF – Tyler Bass 20-yard field goal, 0:14. Chiefs 21–12. Drive: 12 plays, 73 yards, 3:58.

Third quarter

- KC – Harrison Butker 45-yard field goal, 10:53. Chiefs 24–12. Drive: 10 plays, 48 yards, 4:07.
- BUF – Tyler Bass 27-yard field goal, 5:52. Chiefs 24–15. Drive: 11 plays, 67 yards, 4:56.
- KC – Travis Kelce 1-yard pass from Patrick Mahomes (Harrison Butker kick), 3:29. Chiefs 31–15. Drive: 5 plays, 73 yards, 2:20.

Fourth quarter

- KC – Travis Kelce 5-yard pass from Patrick Mahomes (Harrison Butker kick), 7:36. Chiefs 38–15. Drive: 11 plays, 58 yards, 5:35.
- BUF – Isaiah McKenzie 6-yard pass from Josh Allen (pass failed), 4:08. Chiefs 38–21. Drive: 10 plays, 73 yards, 3:28.
- BUF – Tyler Bass 51-yard field goal, 3:19. Chiefs 38–24. Drive: 5 plays, 34 yards, 0:49.

Top passers

- BUF – Josh Allen – 28/48, 287 yards, 2 TDs, INT
- KC – Patrick Mahomes – 29/38, 325 yards, 3 TDs

Top rushers

- BUF – Josh Allen – 7 rushes, 88 yards
- KC – Darrel Williams – 13 rushes, 52 yards, TD

Top receivers

- BUF – Cole Beasley – 7 receptions, 88 yards
- KC – Tyreek Hill – 9 receptions, 172 yards

==== Super Bowl LV: vs. (N5) Tampa Bay Buccaneers ====
Super Bowl LV: (A1) Kansas City Chiefs vs. (N5) Tampa Bay Buccaneers – Game summary

Quarter	1	2	3	4	Total
Chiefs	3	3	3	0	9
Buccaneers	7	14	10	0	31

at Raymond James Stadium, Tampa, Florida

- Date: February 7, 2021
- Game time: 6:40 p.m. EST/5:40 p.m. CST
- Game weather: Clear, 63 °F (17 °C)
- Game attendance: 24,835
- Referee: Carl Cheffers
- TV announcers (CBS): Jim Nantz, Tony Romo, Tracy Wolfson, Evan Washburn and Jay Feely
- Recap, Game Book

Game information

First quarter

- KC – Harrison Butker 49-yard field goal, 5:10. Chiefs 3–0. Drive: 8 plays, 31 yards, 3:23.
- TB – Rob Gronkowski 8-yard pass from Tom Brady (Ryan Succop kick), 0:37. Buccaneers 7–3. Drive: 8 plays, 75 yards, 4:33.

Second quarter

- TB – Rob Gronkowski 17-yard pass from Tom Brady (Ryan Succop kick), 6:05. Buccaneers 14–3. Drive: 6 plays, 38 yards, 2:58.
- KC – Harrison Butker 34-yard field goal, 1:01. Buccaneers 14–6. Drive: 10 plays, 61 yards, 5:04.
- TB – Antonio Brown 1-yard pass from Tom Brady (Ryan Succop kick), 0:06. Buccaneers 21–6. Drive: 5 plays, 71 yards, 0:55.

Third quarter

- KC – Harrison Butker 52-yard field goal, 11:26. Buccaneers 21–9. Drive: 7 plays, 47 yards, 3:34.
- TB – Leonard Fournette 27-yard run (Ryan Succop kick), 7:45. Buccaneers 28–9. Drive: 6 plays, 74 yards, 3:41.
- TB – Ryan Succop 52-yard field goal, 2:46. Buccaneers 31–9. Drive: 8 plays, 11 yards, 3:34.

Fourth quarter

- No scoring plays.

Top passers

- KC – Patrick Mahomes – 26/49, 270 yards, 2 INT
- TB – Tom Brady – 21/29, 201 yards, 3 TD

Top rushers

- KC – Clyde Edwards-Helaire – 9 rushes, 64 yards
- TB – Leonard Fournette – 16 rushes, 89 yards, TD

Top receivers

- KC – Travis Kelce – 10 receptions, 133 yards
- TB – Rob Gronkowski – 6 receptions, 67 yards, 2 TD
