= Emmanuel Smith (disambiguation) =

Emmanuel Smith may refer to:

- Emmanuel Smith (born 1995), American football linebacker
- Emmanuel Smith (musician), on The Voice UK (series 8)
- Emmanuel Smith (footballer) for Watanga FC
- Emmanuel Smith (athlete) in 1987 Central American and Caribbean Championships in Athletics

== See also ==
- Emmanuele Smith, English footballer
