= Darrel Williams =

American football player (born 1995)

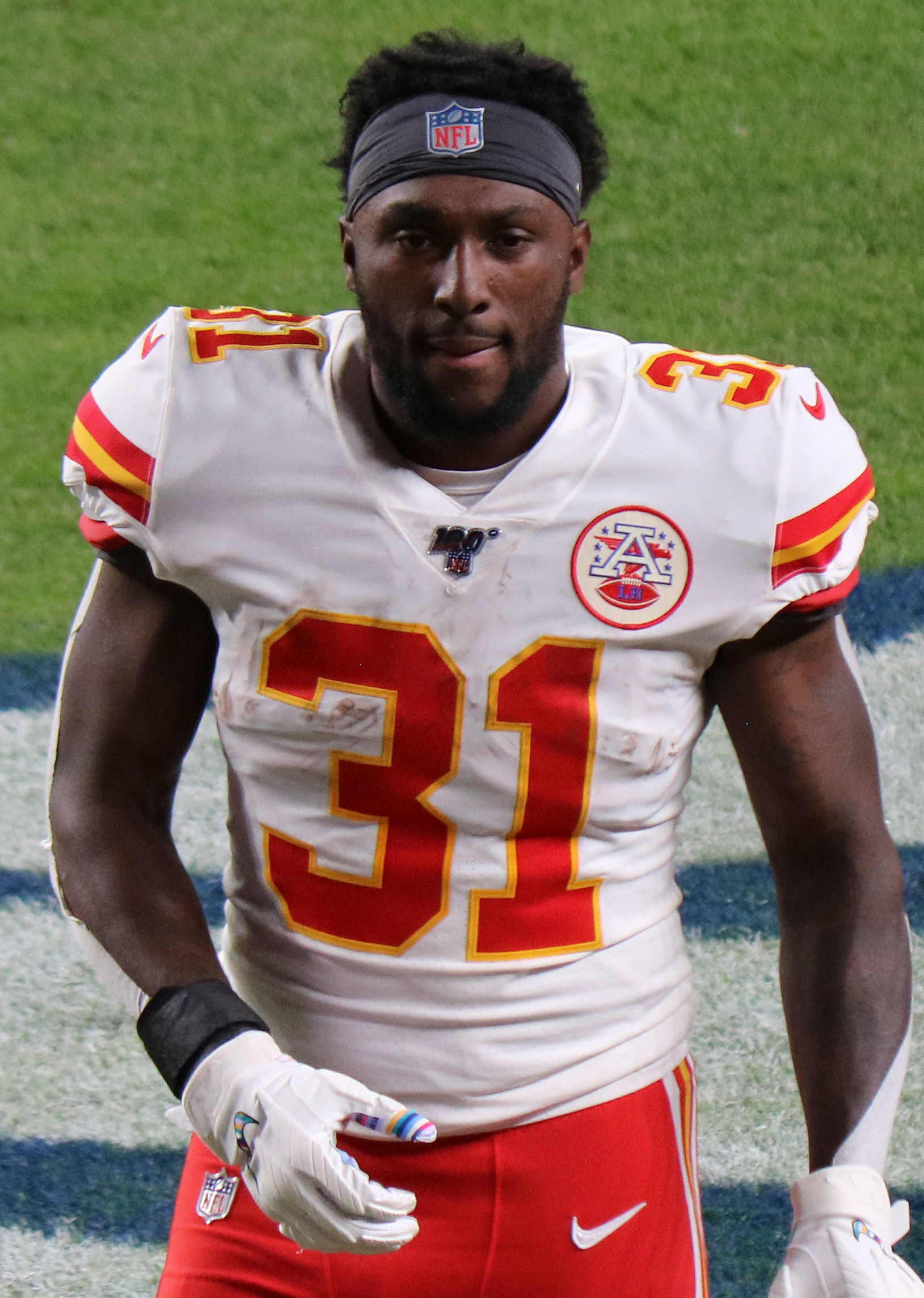
- Williams with the Kansas City Chiefs in 2019

Profile
- Position: Running back

Personal information
- Born: April 15, 1995 (age 31); Marrero, Louisiana, U.S.
- Listed height: 5 ft 11 in (1.80 m)
- Listed weight: 224 lb (102 kg)

Career information
- High school: John Ehret (Marrero)
- College: LSU (2014–2017)
- NFL draft: 2018: undrafted

Career history
- Kansas City Chiefs (2018–2021); Arizona Cardinals (2022); New Orleans Saints (2023)*
- * Offseason or practice squad member only

Awards and highlights
- Super Bowl champion (LIV)

Career NFL statistics
- Rushing yards: 1,014
- Rushing average: 3.9
- Rushing touchdowns: 11
- Receptions: 87
- Receiving yards: 771
- Receiving touchdowns: 4
- Stats at Pro Football Reference

Darrel Williams (born April 15, 1995) is an American professional football running back. He played college football for the LSU Tigers and was signed by the Kansas City Chiefs as an undrafted free agent in 2018. Williams has also been a member of the Arizona Cardinals and New Orleans Saints.

== Early life ==
Williams was a four-star recruit coming out of John Ehret High School in Marrero, Louisiana after rushing for 2,036 yards and 27 touchdowns as a senior. He originally committed to play college football for Arizona State, but after a running back spot opened up at LSU, Williams was recruited by head coach Les Miles to play for them. Williams decided to flip his commitment to LSU over offers from Wisconsin, Tennessee, and Florida, among others.

== College career ==
In Williams's freshman season at LSU, he joined a four-player running back rotation. On October 1, 2016, against Missouri, Williams had 21 carries for 130 rushing yards and three touchdowns.

As a senior, he played in 13 games, starting four, while serving as the primary backup to Derrius Guice. On October 21, 2017, against Ole Miss, Williams became the first player in LSU history to record at least 100 rushing yards and 100 receiving yards in the same game. At the end of LSU's 2017 season, Williams accepted an invitation to play in the 2018 Senior Bowl. He was named one of LSU’s two team MVPs (along with linebacker Devin White) at the conclusion of his senior season in 2017.

Williams finished his career with 321 carries for 1,651 yards and 19 touchdowns to go along with 38 receptions for 462 yards.

== Professional career ==
Pre-draft measurables
Height	Weight	Arm length	Hand span	40-yard dash	20-yard shuttle	Vertical jump	Broad jump	Bench press
5 ft 11 5/8 in (1.82 m)	225 lb (102 kg)	31 in (0.79 m)	9 3/8 in (0.24 m)	4.72 s	4.21 s	32.0 in (0.81 m)	9 ft 1 in (2.77 m)	22 reps
All values from NFL Combine

=== Kansas City Chiefs ===
==== 2018 season ====
After going undrafted in the 2018 NFL draft, Williams was signed by the Kansas City Chiefs as an undrafted free agent on May 5, 2018. He totaled 13 carries for 44 yards and three receptions for 27 yards and a touchdown as a rookie.

==== 2019 season ====
During Week 4 against the Detroit Lions, Williams rushed eight times for 13 yards and two touchdowns and caught three passes for 43 yards in the 34–30 victory. He was placed on injured reserve on December 5, 2019, with a hamstring injury. Williams finished the season with 41 carries for 141 yards and three touchdowns to go along with 15 receptions for 167 yards and a touchdown in 12 games. During his absence, the Chiefs went on to win Super Bowl LIV, their first championship in 50 years.

==== 2020 season ====
In 2020, Williams finished with 39 carries for 169 yards and a touchdown to go along with 18 receptions for 116 yards. He earned the start for the Divisional Round against the Cleveland Browns due to an injury to Clyde Edwards-Helaire, rushing for 78 yards and catching four passes for 16 yards in the 22–17 victory. In the AFC Championship Game against the Buffalo Bills, Williams rushed for 52 yards and a touchdown during the 38–24 victory. During Super Bowl LV, he had 15 scrimmage yards in the 31–9 loss to the Tampa Bay Buccaneers.

==== 2021 season ====
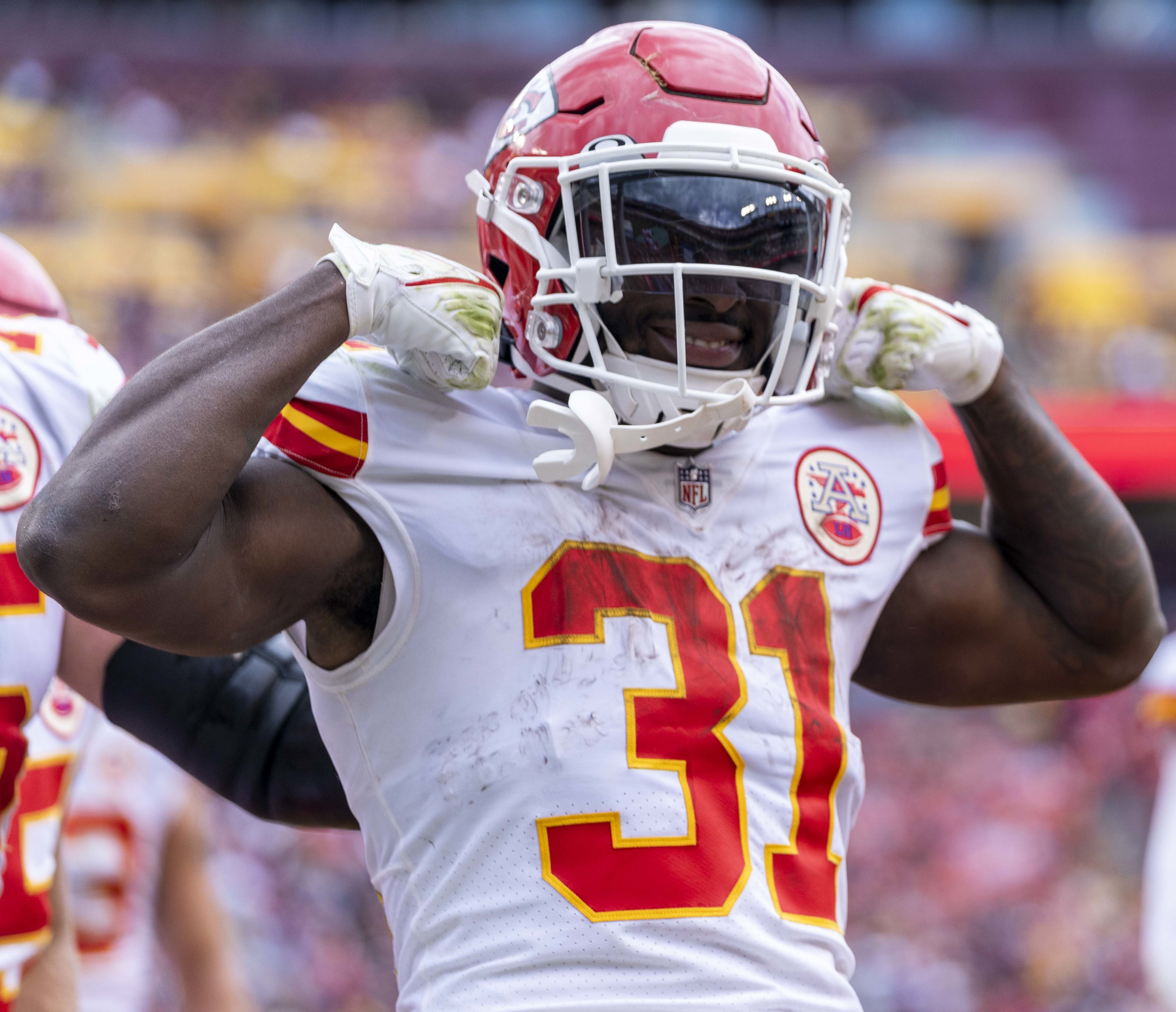
Williams in 2021

Williams signed a one-year contract extension with the Chiefs on March 16, 2021.

Williams finished the 2021 season setting career-highs in carries with 144 carries, rushing yards with 558, rushing touchdowns with six, receptions with 47, receiving yards with 452, and receiving touchdowns with two in 17 games and seven starts.

=== Arizona Cardinals ===
On May 31, 2022, Williams signed with the Arizona Cardinals on a one-year contract. He was placed on injured reserve on November 2.

On November 14, backup running back Eno Benjamin was released, making Williams and rookie running back Keontay Ingram the backups.

=== New Orleans Saints ===
On August 15, 2023, Williams signed with the New Orleans Saints. He was released on August 29.

== Career statistics ==
=== NFL ===
Legend
	Won the Super Bowl
**Bold**	Career high

==== Regular season ====
Year	Team	Games		Rushing					Receiving					Fumbles	
Year	Team	GP	GS	Att	Yds	Avg	Lng	TD	Rec	Yds	Avg	Lng	TD	Fum	Lost
2018	KC	6	0	13	44	3.4	8	0	3	27	9.0	11	1	0	0
2019	KC	12	0	41	141	3.4	**41T**	3	15	167	**11.1**	**52T**	1	**1**	**1**
2020	KC	16	0	39	169	**4.3**	13	1	18	116	6.4	15	0	0	0
2021	KC	**17**	**7**	**144**	**558**	3.9	21	**6**	**47**	**452**	9.6	38	**2**	0	0
2022	ARI	6	0	21	102	4.9	30	1	4	9	2.3	6	0	0	0
Career		57	7	258	1,014	3.9	41T	11	87	771	8.9	52T	4	1	1

==== Postseason ====
Year	Team	Games		Rushing					Receiving					Fumbles	
Year	Team	GP	GS	Att	Yds	Avg	Lng	TD	Rec	Yds	Avg	Lng	TD	Fum	Lost
2018	KC	2	0	3	9	3.0	6	**1**	0	0	0.0	0	0	0	0
2019	KC	0	0	Did not play due to injury											
2020	KC	**3**	**1**	**28**	**135**	**4.8**	**16T**	**1**	**7**	**35**	**5.0**	**9T**	0	0	0
2021	KC	2	0	1	4	4.0	4	0	0	0	0.0	0	0	**1**	**1**
Career		7	1	32	148	4.6	16T	2	7	35	5.0	9T	0	1	1

=== College ===
Year	School	Conf	Class	Pos	G	Rushing				Receiving			
Year	School	Conf	Class	Pos	G	**Att**	**Yds**	**Avg**	**TD**	**Rec**	**Yds**	**Avg**	**TD**
2014	LSU	SEC	FR	RB	11	64	302	4.7	3	6	63	10.5	0
2015	LSU	SEC	SO	RB	11	60	296	4.9	4	4	31	7.8	0
2016	LSU	SEC	JR	RB	9	52	233	4.5	3	5	37	7.4	0
2017	LSU	SEC	SR	RB	13	145	820	5.7	9	23	331	14.4	0
**Career**	**LSU**				**44**	**321**	**1,651**	**5.1**	**19**	**38**	**462**	**12.2**	**0**
