= Mike Danna =

American football player (born 1997)

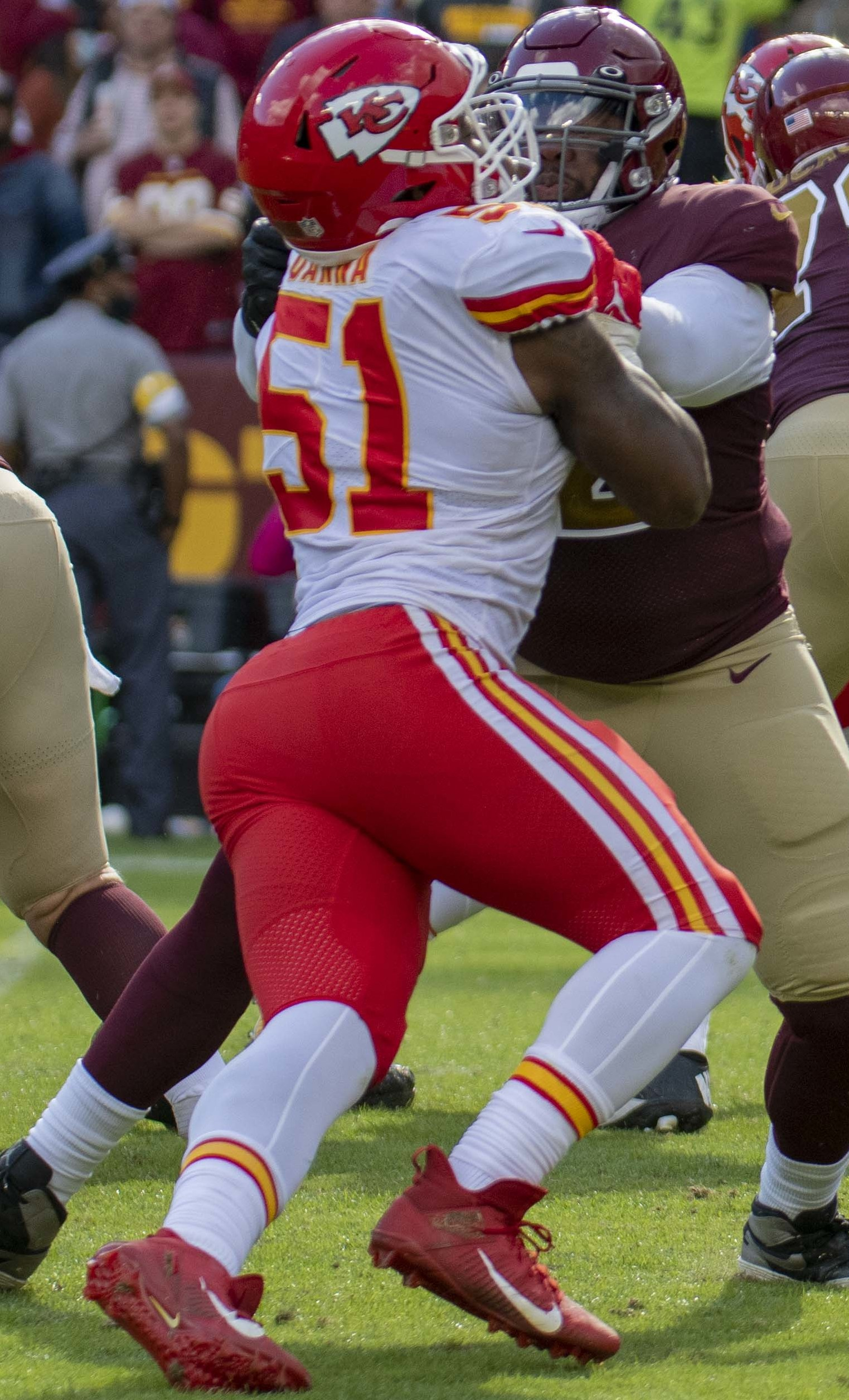
- Danna with the Kansas City Chiefs in 2021

No. 51 – Buffalo Bills
- Position: Outside linebacker
- Roster status: Active

Personal information
- Born: December 4, 1997 (age 28); Detroit, Michigan, U.S.
- Listed height: 6 ft 2 in (1.88 m)
- Listed weight: 257 lb (117 kg)

Career information
- High school: De La Salle Collegiate (Warren, Michigan)
- College: Central Michigan (2015–2018); Michigan (2019)
- NFL draft: 2020: 5th round, 177th overall pick

Career history
- Kansas City Chiefs (2020–2025); Buffalo Bills (2026–present)

Awards and highlights
- 2× Super Bowl champion (LVII, LVIII); First-team All-MAC (2018)

Career NFL statistics as of Week 3, 2026
- Total tackles: 194
- Sacks: 21.5
- Pass deflections: 6
- Interceptions: 1
- Forced fumbles: 6
- Stats at Pro Football Reference

Michael Danna (born December 4, 1997) is an American professional football outside linebacker for the Buffalo Bills of the National Football League (NFL). He played college football for the Central Michigan Chippewas and Michigan Wolverines. Danna was selected by the Kansas City Chiefs in the fifth round of the 2020 NFL draft, where he played until 2025.

== Early life ==
Danna began playing football at De La Salle Collegiate High School in Warren, Michigan. In 2014, he led the school to a state title. Danna compiled 20 tackles-for-loss and earned All-State special mention from the Associated Press.

== College career ==
Danna played three seasons at Central Michigan and earned first-team all-Mid-American Conference honors in 2018. He transferred to Michigan where he was a part-time starter. Danna had 38 tackles (three for a loss) and three sacks during the 2019 season. He had six tackles and a sack against Michigan State, earning Team Defensive Lineman of the Game honors. Danna also had five tackles and a sack against Iowa.

== Professional career ==
Pre-draft measurables
Height	Weight	Arm length	Hand span	Wingspan
6 ft 1 1/2 in (1.87 m)	251 lb (114 kg)	32 1/2 in (0.83 m)	10 1/2 in (0.27 m)	6 ft 7 1/8 in (2.01 m)
All values from Pro Day

=== Kansas City Chiefs ===
Danna was selected by the Kansas City Chiefs with the 177th overall pick in the fifth round of the 2020 NFL draft. In Week 2 against the Los Angeles Chargers, Danna recorded his first career sack during the 23–20 win. He was placed on injured reserve on October 10, 2020, with a hamstring injury. He was activated on October 31. He was placed on the reserve/COVID-19 list by the team on January 6, 2021, and activated on January 11.

In 2022, Danna won his first Super Bowl when the Chiefs defeated the Philadelphia Eagles in Super Bowl LVII. In 2023, Danna won his second straight Super Bowl when the Chiefs defeated the San Francisco 49ers in Super Bowl LVIII. Danna recorded three tackles in the game.

Danna re-signed with the Chiefs on April 10, 2024 on a three-year, $24 million contract. He made 13 appearances (12 starts) for the team, recording one pass deflection, two forced fumbles, 3.5 sacks, and 41 combined tackles. Danna made 15 appearances (including 14 starts) for the Chiefs during the 2025 season, compiling one interception, one pass deflection, one sack, and 25 total tackles. On February 24, 2026, Danna was released by the Chiefs after spending six seasons with the team.

=== Buffalo Bills ===
On May 11, 2026, Danna signed a one-year contract with the Buffalo Bills. On October 12, Danna was released by the Bills, but was re-signed by the team on October 13.

== NFL career statistics ==
Legend
	Won the Super Bowl
**Bold**	Career high

=== Regular season ===
Year	Team	Games		Tackles					Fumbles				Interceptions					
Year	Team	GP	GS	Cmb	Solo	Ast	Sck	TFL	FF	FR	Yds	TD	Int	Yds	Avg	Lng	TD	PD
2020	KC	13	1	25	16	9	2.5	4	0	0	0	0	0	0	0.0	0	0	0
2021	KC	**17**	6	26	11	15	3.0	3	**2**	0	0	0	0	0	0.0	0	0	1
2022	KC	13	0	27	9	18	5.0	3	**2**	0	0	0	0	0	0.0	0	0	0
2023	KC	16	**16**	**50**	**32**	18	**6.5**	**7**	0	0	0	0	0	0	0.0	0	0	**3**
2024	KC	13	12	41	20	**21**	3.5	5	**2**	0	0	0	0	0	0.0	0	0	1
2025	KC	15	14	25	8	17	1.0	3	0	0	0	0	**1**	**10**	**10.0**	**10**	0	1
2026	BUF	1	0	0	0	0	0.0	0	0	0	0	0	0	0	0	0	0	0
Career		88	49	194	96	98	21.5	25	6	0	0	0	1	10	10.0	10	0	6

=== Postseason ===
Year	Team	Games		Tackles					Fumbles				Interceptions					
Year	Team	GP	GS	Cmb	Solo	Ast	Sck	TFL	FF	FR	Yds	TD	Int	Yds	Avg	Lng	TD	PD
2020	KC	3	0	4	1	3	0.0	0	0	0	0	0	0	0	0.0	0	0	0
2021	KC	3	0	3	3	0	**1.0**	**1**	0	0	0	0	0	0	0.0	0	0	0
2022	KC	3	0	6	**4**	2	0.0	0	0	0	0	0	0	0	0.0	0	0	0
2023	KC	**4**	**4**	**7**	3	4	0.0	0	0	0	0	0	0	0	0.0	0	0	0
2024	KC	3	3	**7**	2	**5**	**1.0**	**1**	**1**	0	0	0	0	0	0.0	0	0	0
Career		16	7	27	13	14	2.0	2	1	0	0	0	0	0	0.0	0	0	0
