= Darius Harris =

American football player (born 1996)

Profile
- Position: Linebacker

Personal information
- Born: January 17, 1996 (age 30); Horn Lake, Mississippi, U.S.
- Listed height: 6 ft 2 in (1.88 m)
- Listed weight: 245 lb (111 kg)

Career information
- High school: Horn Lake
- College: Middle Tennessee (2014–2018)
- NFL draft: 2019: undrafted

Career history
- Kansas City Chiefs (2019–2022); Las Vegas Raiders (2023)*; Kansas City Chiefs (2023); Dallas Cowboys (2024); New England Patriots (2025)*
- * Offseason or practice squad member only

Awards and highlights
- 3× Super Bowl champion (LIV, LVII, LVIII)

Career NFL statistics as of 2025
- Total tackles: 59
- Sacks: 1.5
- Fumble recoveries: 2
- Stats at Pro Football Reference

Darius Leseaun Harris (born January 17, 1996) is an American professional football linebacker. He played college football for the Middle Tennessee Blue Raiders. He has previously played for the Kansas City Chiefs and Dallas Cowboys.

== Professional career ==
Pre-draft measurables
Height	Weight	Arm length	Hand span	Wingspan	40-yard dash	10-yard split	20-yard split	20-yard shuttle	Three-cone drill	Vertical jump	Broad jump
6 ft 2 3/8 in (1.89 m)	232 lb (105 kg)	34 1/8 in (0.87 m)	9 5/8 in (0.24 m)	6 ft 7 3/8 in (2.02 m)	4.70 s	1.64 s	2.77 s	4.50 s	7.52 s	31.0 in (0.79 m)	10 ft 2 in (3.10 m)
All values from Pro Day

=== Kansas City Chiefs (first stint) ===
Harris was signed by the Kansas City Chiefs as an undrafted free agent on April 29, 2019. On July 24, he was placed on the non-football injury reserve while recovering from a shoulder injury he suffered late in college, spending the entire season there. Without Harris, the Chiefs won Super Bowl LIV against the San Francisco 49ers.

Harris returned to the Chiefs the next season, but was waived on September 5, 2020 and was signed to the practice squad the next day. On September 30, he was promoted from the practice squad.

On October 9, 2021, Harris was waived by the Chiefs and re-signed to the practice squad. He signed a reserve/future contract with the Chiefs on February 2, 2022.

Harris won his second Super Bowl when the Chiefs won Super Bowl LVII 38-35 against the Philadelphia Eagles with Harris recording one tackle in the game.

=== Las Vegas Raiders ===
On August 1, 2023, Harris signed with the Las Vegas Raiders. He was waived eleven days later. Harris was signed to the Raiders' practice squad on October 24.

=== Kansas City Chiefs (second stint) ===
Harris was signed off the Raiders practice squad by the Chiefs on October 31, 2023. He was released on December 16 and re-signed to the practice squad three days later. He was promoted to the active roster on January 26, 2024. Harris won his third Super Bowl championship when the Chiefs defeated the San Francisco 49ers in Super Bowl LVIII.

On February 27, 2024, Harris once again signed with Kansas City.

=== Dallas Cowboys ===
On August 6, 2024, Harris signed with the Dallas Cowboys. He was released on August 27, and re-signed to the practice squad. He was promoted to the active roster on December 28. Harris signed a reserve/future contract on January 6, 2025.

On August 26, 2025, Harris was released by the Cowboys as part of final roster cuts.

=== New England Patriots ===
On September 3, 2025, Harris signed with the New England Patriots practice squad. He was placed on injured reserve on November 17.
