= Clyde Edwards-Helaire =

American football player (born 1999)

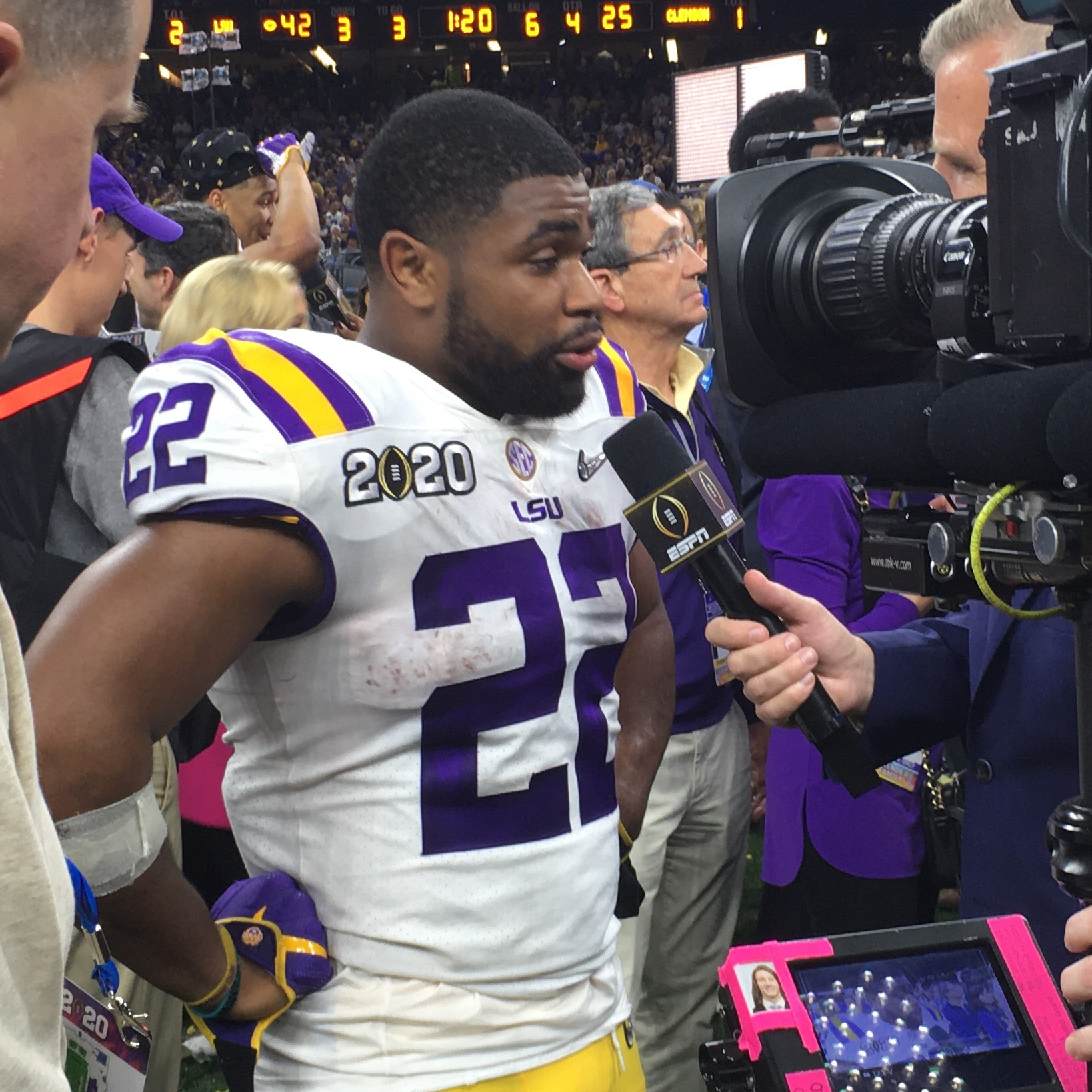
- Edwards-Helaire with the LSU Tigers in 2020

Profile
- Position: Running back

Personal information
- Born: April 11, 1999 (age 27); Baton Rouge, Louisiana, U.S.
- Listed height: 5 ft 7 in (1.70 m)
- Listed weight: 207 lb (94 kg)

Career information
- High school: Catholic (Baton Rouge, Louisiana)
- College: LSU (2017–2019)
- NFL draft: 2020: 1st round, 32nd overall pick

Career history
- Kansas City Chiefs (2020–2024); New Orleans Saints (2024); Kansas City Chiefs (2025)

Awards and highlights
- 2× Super Bowl champion (LVII, LVIII); CFP national champion (2019); First-team All-SEC (2019)

Career NFL statistics as of 2025
- Rushing yards: 1,904
- Rushing average: 4.1
- Rushing touchdowns: 12
- Receptions: 94
- Receiving yards: 798
- Receiving touchdowns: 7
- Stats at Pro Football Reference

Clyde Edwards-Helaire (/ˈiːlɛr/ EE-lair; né Edwards; born April 11, 1999) is an American professional football running back. He played college football for the LSU Tigers and was selected by the Kansas City Chiefs in the first round of the 2020 NFL draft. Edwards-Helaire is a two-time Super Bowl champion.

== Early life ==
Edwards-Helaire was born and raised in Baton Rouge, Louisiana. He attended Catholic High School and became the first freshman in then head coach Dale Weiner's 29 year tenure to play on the varsity football team as a freshman. In addition to football, Edwards-Helaire also competed in track & field. As a senior, Edwards-Helaire rushed 58 times for 496 yards and 10 touchdowns and was named the MVP of the 5A State Championship Game after catching eight passes for 161 yards and rushing for 88 yards and a touchdown in the Bears 31–28 victory over Archbishop Rummel High School. Rated a four-star recruit, Edwards-Helaire committed to play college football for the LSU Tigers.

== College career ==
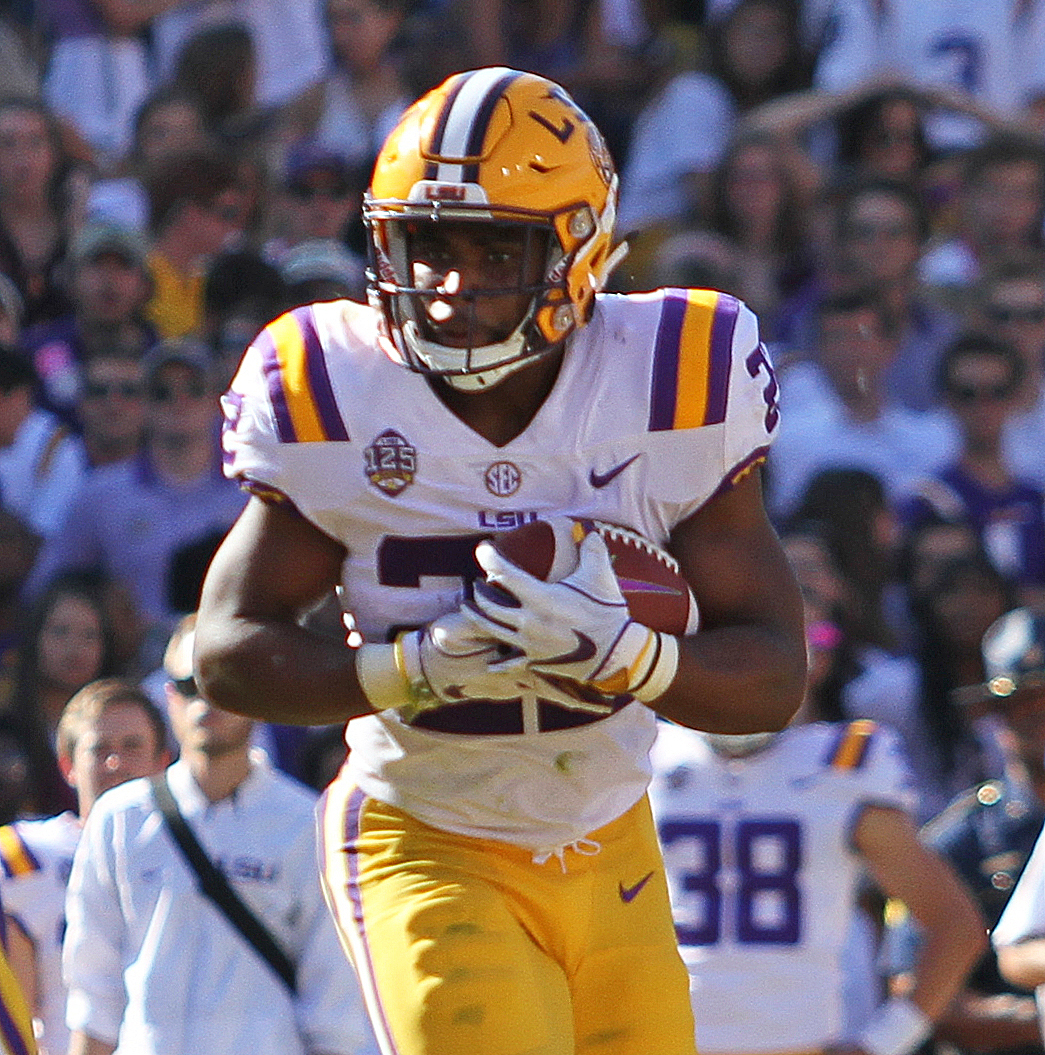
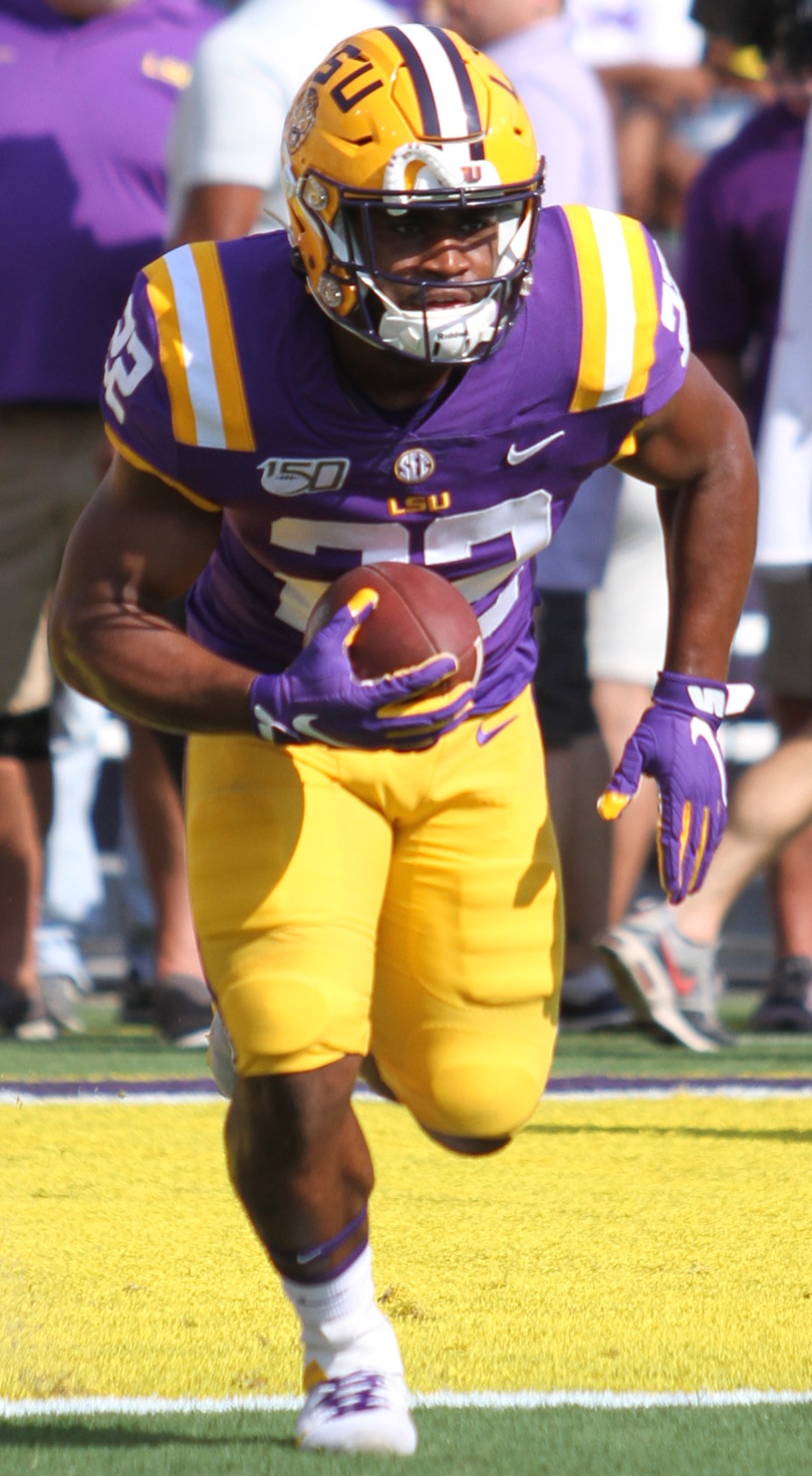
Edwards-Helaire in 2019

As a true freshman, Edwards-Helaire played in all 13 of the Tigers' games, playing mostly on special teams and rushing nine times for 31 yards. As a sophomore, Edwards-Helaire finished second on the team with 658 rushing yards and seven touchdowns with 11 receptions for 96 yards and also returned 17 kicks for 416 yards. He recorded his first 100-yard game in a 38–21 win over Louisiana Tech, gaining 136 yards with two touchdowns on 20 carries. Edwards-Helaire rushed for 145 yards in LSU's 36–16 victory over second-ranked Georgia.

Edwards-Helaire was named LSU's starting running back and on the watchlists for the Maxwell and Paul Hornung Awards going into his junior season. He played a major role in LSU's win over third-ranked Alabama, rushing for 103 yards and three touchdowns and catching nine passes for 77 yards and a touchdown in the 46–41 victory and was named the SEC co-Offensive Player of the Week along with LSU quarterback Joe Burrow. Edwards-Helaire finished the regular season with 1,414 rushing yards, which ranked third-most in a single season in school history, and 16 touchdowns on 215 carries, 453 receiving yards and a touchdown on 55 receptions and returned 16 kicks for 214 yards and was a consensus first-team All-SEC selection at running back and was named second-team by the league's coaches as an all-purpose performer and was also the only SEC running back to be named a semifinalist for the Doak Walker Award. After playing sparingly against Oklahoma in the 2019 Peach Bowl due to a hamstring injury, Edwards-Helaire rushed 16 times for 110 yards and caught five passes for 54 yards in LSU's 42–25 win over third-ranked Clemson in the 2020 National Championship Game. Following the end of the season, Edwards-Helaire announced that he would forgo his senior season to enter the 2020 NFL draft.

== Professional career ==
Pre-draft measurables
Height	Weight	Arm length	Hand span	Wingspan	40-yard dash	10-yard split	20-yard split	Vertical jump	Broad jump	Bench press
5 ft 7 1/4 in (1.71 m)	215 lb (98 kg)	29 in (0.74 m)	9 5/8 in (0.24 m)	5 ft 10 5/8 in (1.79 m)	4.57 s	1.60 s	2.55 s	39.5 in (1.00 m)	10 ft 3 in (3.12 m)	15 reps
All values from NFL Combine

=== Kansas City Chiefs (first stint) ===
==== 2020 season ====
Edwards-Helaire was selected by the Kansas City Chiefs, in the first round with the 32nd overall pick of the 2020 NFL Draft.

Edwards-Helaire made his debut for the Chiefs in Week 1 as the starting running back after Damien Williams opted out of the 2020 season. In his first career start, he rushed 25 times for 138 yards and scored a rushing touchdown in the 34–20 victory over the Houston Texans. At 21 years of age, he became the youngest player in NFL history to rush for at least 130 yards and a touchdown in his NFL debut. In Week 6, against the Buffalo Bills, he rushed 26 times for 161 rushing yards in the 26–17 victory. In Week 11 against the Las Vegas Raiders, Edwards-Helaire rushed for two touchdowns during the 35–31 win. On Week 15 against the New Orleans Saints, Edwards-Helaire suffered a hip and ankle injury, making him unavailable for the remainder of the 2020 NFL regular season. Overall, he finished his rookie season with 181 carries for 803 rushing yards and four rushing touchdowns to go along with 36 receptions for 297 receiving yards and one receiving touchdown.

In the AFC Championship against the Buffalo Bills, Edwards-Helaire rushed six times for seven yards and a touchdown during the 38–24 win. In Super Bowl LV against the Tampa Bay Buccaneers, Edwards-Helaire rushed nine times for 64 yards and recorded two catches for 23 yards during the 9–31 loss.

==== 2021 season ====
In Weeks 3–4, Edwards-Helaire recorded consecutive 100-yard rushing games. After injuring his knee in the Chiefs' Week 5 game against the Bills, Edwards-Helaire was placed on injured reserve on October 12, 2021. He was activated on November 20, 2021. Overall, he finished the 2021 season with 119 carries for 517 rushing yards and four rushing touchdowns to go along with 19 receptions for 129 receiving yards and two receiving touchdowns in ten games.

==== 2022 season ====
A lack of consistent production and injuries resulted in Edwards-Helaire losing his starting job to rookie seventh round pick Isiah Pacheco. On November 23, 2022, Edwards-Helaire was placed on injured reserve. He was activated from injured reserve on February 6, 2023, but was inactive for Super Bowl LVII. Without Edwards-Helaire, the Chiefs won Super Bowl LVII against the Philadelphia Eagles.

==== 2023 season ====
The Chiefs declined their 2024 fifth-year option for Edwards-Helaire on May 2, 2023. Edwards-Helaire finished the season with 223 rushing yards on 70 carries. The Chiefs won Super Bowl LVIII against the San Francisco 49ers 25–22 in overtime to win their second consecutive Super Bowl championship. In the game, he played in four snaps, recording a carry with no yards.

==== 2024 season ====
Edwards-Helaire re-signed with the Chiefs on April 8, 2024. He was placed on the NFL's Reserve/Non-football illness (NFI) list prior to Week 1. He was activated on October 15, but was released from the team on December 16.

=== New Orleans Saints ===
On December 18, 2024, Edwards-Helaire signed with the New Orleans Saints practice squad. He was elevated for the team's Week 17 matchup against the Las Vegas Raiders, recording five carries and two receptions for 30 total yards.

On February 13, 2025, Edwards-Helaire re-signed with the Saints on a one-year contract. On August 26, Edwards-Helaire was released by the Saints as part of final roster cuts.

=== Kansas City Chiefs (second stint) ===
On August 28, 2025, Edwards-Helaire was signed to the Kansas City Chiefs' practice squad.

== NFL career statistics ==
Legend
	Won the Super Bowl
**Bold**	Career high

=== Regular season ===
Year	Team	Games		Rushing					Receiving					Fumbles	
Year	Team	GP	GS	Att	Yds	Avg	Lng	TD	Rec	Yds	Avg	Lng	TD	Fum	Lost
2020	KC	13	**13**	**181**	**803**	**4.4**	31	**4**	**36**	**297**	8.3	26	1	0	0
2021	KC	10	10	119	517	4.3	17	**4**	19	129	6.8	29	2	**2**	**2**
2022	KC	10	6	71	302	4.3	**52**	3	17	151	8.9	25	**3**	0	0
2023	KC	**15**	3	70	223	3.2	20	1	17	188	**11.1**	**48**	1	0	0
2024	NO	2	0	13	46	3.5	12	0	3	24	8.0	14	0	0	0
Career		50	32	454	1,891	4.2	52	12	92	789	8.6	48	7	2	2

=== Postseason ===
Year	Team	Games		Rushing					Receiving					Fumbles	
Year	Team	GP	GS	Att	Yds	Avg	Lng	TD	Rec	Yds	Avg	Lng	TD	Fum	Lost
2020	KC	2	2	**15**	71	4.7	26	**1**	3	**23**	**7.7**	**18**	0	0	0
2021	KC	2	0	13	**96**	**7.4**	22	0	2	13	6.5	9	0	0	0
2022	KC	0	0	Did not play due to injury											
2023	KC	4	0	11	53	4.8	**28**	0	**4**	7	1.8	5	0	**1**	**1**
Career		8	2	39	220	5.6	28	1	9	43	4.8	18	0	1	1

== Personal life ==
In December 2018, Edwards-Helaire was involved in a fatal self-defense shooting in Scotlandville, Louisiana. Edwards-Helaire and teammate Jared Small met 18-year old Kobe Johnson in an arranged electronics sale. When the meeting took place, Johnson pulled a gun and tried to rob them, at which point one of the players pulled their own gun and fatally shot him. Authorities did not reveal which player fired the fatal shots. As a result of the shooting, Edwards-Helaire has post-traumatic stress disorder and has been open about his struggles and how it has occasionally caused him to miss practice or other things in his life. He received a heroism award from the Uvalde Foundation for Kids after shielding a teenager from gunfire during a shooting at the Chiefs' Super Bowl LVIII parade.

His surname is taken from his biological father (Edwards) and his stepfather (Helaire). He legally had it changed after meeting with an attorney at fourteen years old, keeping his biological father's last name out of respect while honoring his stepfather for his presence during his upbringing.

Edwards-Helaire's sister Madee has a form of Muscular dystrophy, and appeared on the MDA Kevin Hart Kids Telethon.
