= Chris Lammons =

American football player (born 1996)

Profile
- Position: Cornerback

Personal information
- Born: January 31, 1996 (age 30); Lauderhill, Florida, U.S.
- Listed height: 5 ft 10 in (1.78 m)
- Listed weight: 190 lb (86 kg)

Career information
- High school: Plantation (Plantation, Florida)
- College: South Carolina (2014–2017)
- NFL draft: 2018: undrafted

Career history
- Atlanta Falcons (2018)*; New Orleans Saints (2018)*; Miami Dolphins (2018–2019); Kansas City Chiefs (2019–2022); Cincinnati Bengals (2023)*; Indianapolis Colts (2023–2025)
- * Offseason or practice squad member only

Awards and highlights
- Super Bowl champion (LIV)

Career NFL statistics as of 2023
- Total tackles: 32
- Forced fumbles: 1
- Fumble recoveries: 1
- Pass deflections: 4
- Interceptions: 1
- Stats at Pro Football Reference

Christopher Lamar Lammons (born January 31, 1996) is an American professional football cornerback. He played college football for the South Carolina Gamecocks.

== College career ==
Lammons played four seasons at South Carolina. In his junior season, Lammons started all 13 of the Gamecocks games and made 53 tackles (four for loss), a sack, five passes defended and finished eighth in the Southeastern Conference with three interceptions. As a senior, he finished third on the team with 79 tackles (three for loss), two forced fumbles and seven passes defended. Lammons finished his collegiate career with 177 total tackles (nine for loss), a sack, four interceptions and 21 passes defended with three fumbles forced and three recovered.

== Professional career ==
Pre-draft measurables
| Height | Weight | Arm length | Hand span | 40-yard dash | 10-yard split | 20-yard split | 20-yard shuttle | Three-cone drill | Vertical jump | Broad jump | Bench press |
|---|---|---|---|---|---|---|---|---|---|---|---|
| 5 ft 9 1/4 in (1.76 m) | 194 lb (88 kg) | 31 5/8 in (0.80 m) | 9 in (0.23 m) | 4.48 s | 1.56 s | 2.60 s | 4.25 s | 7.04 s | 35.0 in (0.89 m) | 9 ft 8 in (2.95 m) | 11 reps |
All values from Pro Day

=== Atlanta Falcons ===
Lammons signed with the Atlanta Falcons as an undrafted free agent on April 28, 2018. He was waived on September 1, 2018, as part of final roster cuts.

=== New Orleans Saints ===
Lammons was signed to the New Orleans Saints practice squad on October 3, 2018, but was waived on October 20, 2018.

=== Miami Dolphins ===
Lammons was signed to the Miami Dolphins practice squad on November 28, 2018, and stayed there for the rest of the 2018 season. He made his NFL debut on September 8, 2019, in the Dolphins season opener against the Baltimore Ravens, registering one pass defended. In week 13 against the Philadelphia Eagles, Lammons intercepted a Hail Mary pass thrown by Carson Wentz late in the fourth quarter to seal a 37–31 Dolphins' win for his first career interception. He was waived on December 7, 2019.

=== Kansas City Chiefs ===
On December 10, 2019, Lammons was signed to the Kansas City Chiefs practice squad. Lammons remained on the practice squad for the rest of the 2019 season, including during the Chiefs Super Bowl LIV victory. He re-signed with the Chiefs on February 5, 2020. He was waived during final roster cuts on September 5, 2020, and signed to the practice squad the following day. He was elevated to the active roster on December 5 and 12 for the team's weeks 13 and 14 games against the Denver Broncos and Dolphins, and reverted to the practice squad after each game. He was elevated again to the active roster on January 16 and 23 for the team's divisional playoff game and AFC Championship Game against the Cleveland Browns and Buffalo Bills, and reverted to the practice squad again following each game. On February 6, 2021, Lammons was promoted to the active roster ahead of Super Bowl LV against the Tampa Bay Buccaneers.

On December 11, 2021, Lammons was placed on injured reserve. He re-signed with the Chiefs on June 16, 2022. He was waived on January 23, 2023.

=== Cincinnati Bengals ===
On January 24, 2023, Lammons was claimed off waivers by the Cincinnati Bengals, but was not added to their roster until after Super Bowl LVII.

=== Indianapolis Colts ===
On July 27, 2023, Lammons signed with the Indianapolis Colts. He was suspended for the first three games of the regular season on August 4. Following his suspension, Lammons was released on September 25, and re-signed to the practice squad. He was signed to the active roster on December 22.

Lammons was released by the Colts on August 27, 2024, and re-signed to the practice squad. On September 10, he was signed to the active roster. Lammons was waived by Indianapolis on January 4, 2025.

On August 1, 2025, Lammons re-signed with the Colts. He was released on August 26 as part of final roster cuts and re-signed to the practice squad the next day. On October 4, Lammons was signed to the active roster. In 10 appearances (one start) for the team, he recorded three pass deflections and 17 combined tackles. On December 9, Lammons was placed on injured reserve due to a foot injury suffered in Week 14 against the Jacksonville Jaguars.

== Legal issues ==
Lammons had a warrant issued for his arrest on February 16, 2022, in Las Vegas, Nevada in connection to an alleged assault that included New Orleans Saints running back Alvin Kamara. His attorney filed a motion to have the warrant recalled. The following day, Lammons turned himself in. He was released after going through the booking process and posting a $5,000 bail but was not actually put in a jail cell. He received a felony charge for battery resulting in substantial bodily harm and a misdemeanor charge of conspiracy to commit battery.
