= Omari Cobb =

American football player (born 1997)

No. 59
- Position: Linebacker

Personal information
- Born: May 31, 1997 (age 29); Port St. Lucie, Florida, U.S.
- Listed height: 6 ft 4 in (1.93 m)
- Listed weight: 223 lb (101 kg)

Career information
- High school: Treasure Coast (Port St. Lucie, Florida)
- College: Marshall (2016–2019)
- NFL draft: 2020: undrafted

Career history
- Kansas City Chiefs (2020–2021); New York Giants (2021)*; Houston Roughnecks (2024)*; San Antonio Brahmas (2024)*
- * Offseason or practice squad member only

Career NFL statistics
- Total tackles: 1
- Stats at Pro Football Reference

Omari Cobb (born May 31, 1997) is an American professional football linebacker. After playing college football for Marshall, he signed with the Kansas City Chiefs as an undrafted free agent in 2020.

== College career ==
Cobb played college football at Marshall from 2016 to 2019.

== Professional career ==
Pre-draft measurables
Height	Weight	Arm length	Hand span	40-yard dash	10-yard split	20-yard split	20-yard shuttle	Three-cone drill	Vertical jump	Broad jump	Bench press
6 ft 4 in (1.93 m)	229 lb (104 kg)	33 1/2 in (0.85 m)	9 3/8 in (0.24 m)	4.71 s	1.58 s	2.67 s	4.64 s	7.09 s	37.0 in (0.94 m)	10 ft 0 in (3.05 m)	21 reps
All values from Pro Day

=== Kansas City Chiefs ===
Cobb signed with the Kansas City Chiefs as an undrafted free agent following the 2020 NFL draft on April 27, 2020. He was waived by the Chiefs during final roster cuts on September 5, and was re–signed to the team's practice squad the next day. Cobb was elevated to the active roster on December 26 for the team's Week 16 game against the Atlanta Falcons, and reverted to the practice squad after the game.

On February 9, 2021, Cobb re-signed with the Chiefs. He was waived by Kansas City as a part of final roster cuts on August 31, and was re-signed to the practice squad the following day. Cobb was released by the Chiefs on September 14.

=== New York Giants ===
On September 29, 2021, Cobb was signed to the New York Giants' practice squad. He signed a reserve/futures contract with the Giants on January 10, 2022. Cobb was waived by New York on May 10.

=== Houston Roughnecks ===
On November 17, 2022, Cobb was drafted by the San Antonio Brahmas of the XFL, but he did not sign with the team. On July 5, 2023, Cobb had his XFL rights acquired by the Houston Roughnecks of the XFL. He signed with the Roughnecks on October 20. The Roughnecks brand was transferred to the Houston Gamblers when the XFL and United States Football League merged to create the United Football League (UFL).

=== San Antonio Brahmas ===
On January 5, 2024, Cobb was drafted by the San Antonio Brahmas during the 2024 UFL dispersal draft. He was released by the Brahmas on March 10.
