= Emmanuel Smith (musician) =

Gospel musician

Emmanuel Smith is a Ghanaian-born UK-based singer, songwriter and urban gospel musician known for his appearance on The Voice UK Season 8 in 2019.

== Early life and education ==
Emmanuel was born on 12 April in Ghana; at age 13 he moved to the UK to join his mother. He attended Cambridge International in Kumasi, Swanlea in Aldgate for his secondary education and the Kingston University, and Southbank University, where he studied Media and Cultural Studies.

== Career ==
His performance at coveted main stage at Big Church Day Out and Festival of Life UK, both held at the ExCel London brought him into the limelight. Emmanuel Smith Live in Ghana which was a worship and praise concert that saw him share stage with MOG, Joe Mettle, KODA, Akese Brempong.
