= Tim Ward (gridiron football) =

American football player (born 1997)

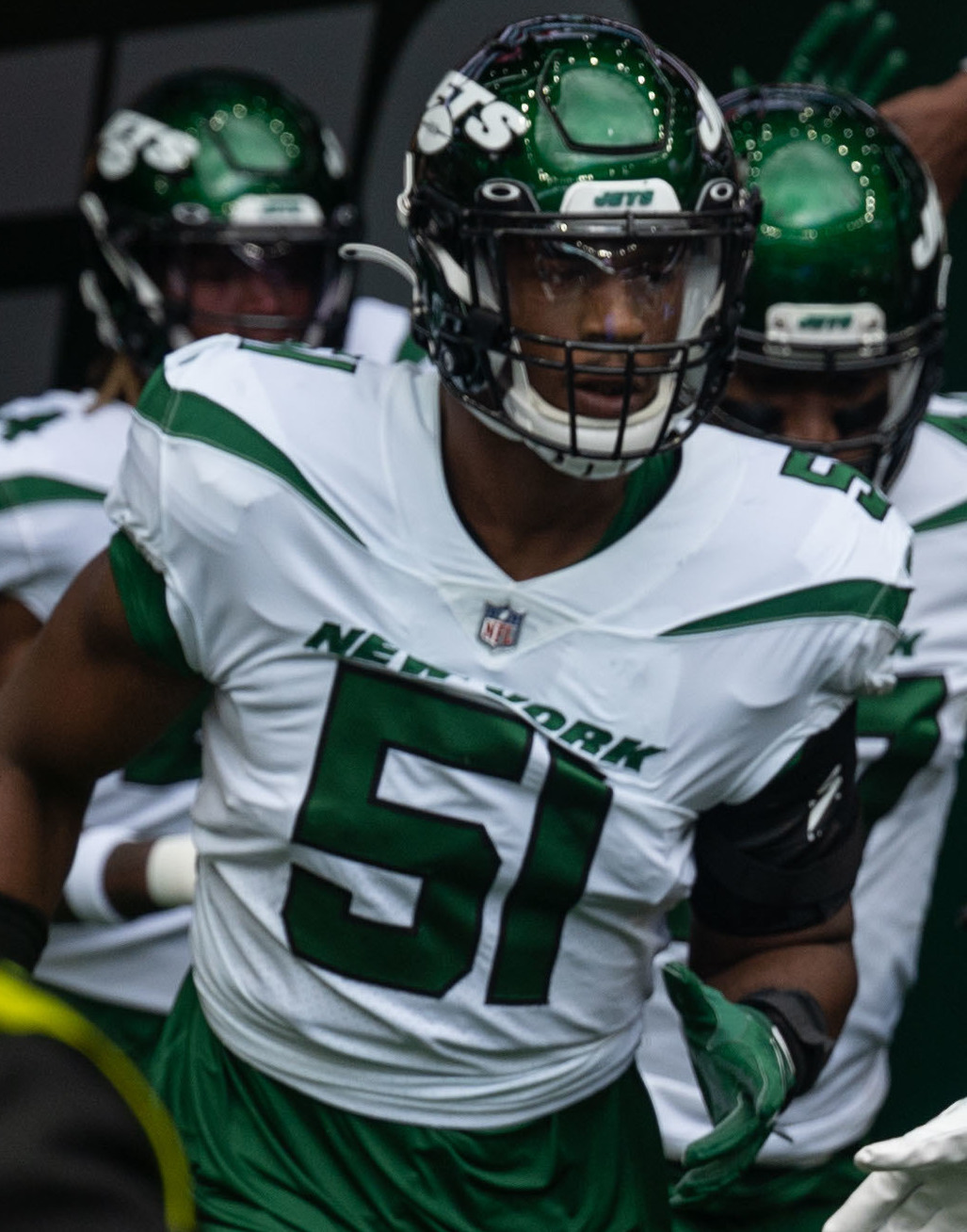
- Ward with the New York Jets in 2021

No. 51
- Position: Linebacker

Personal information
- Born: August 11, 1997 (age 29); High Point, North Carolina, U.S.
- Listed height: 6 ft 6 in (1.98 m)
- Listed weight: 255 lb (116 kg)

Career information
- High school: High Point Central
- College: Old Dominion (2015–2018)
- NFL draft: 2019: undrafted

Career history
- Kansas City Chiefs (2019–2020); New York Jets (2021); Green Bay Packers (2022)*; Houston Roughnecks (2023); DC Defenders (2024)*; San Antonio Brahmas (2024); Hamilton Tiger-Cats (2024)
- * Offseason or practice squad member only

Awards and highlights
- Super Bowl champion (LIV)

Career NFL statistics
- Total tackles: 17
- Sacks: 1
- Pass deflections: 2
- Stats at Pro Football Reference

Tim Ward (born August 11, 1997) is an American former professional football player who was a linebacker in the National Football League (NFL). He played college football for the Old Dominion Monarchs.

== College career ==
Ward was a member of the Old Dominion Monarchs for four seasons. He finished his collegiate career with 125 tackles, 30.5 tackles for loss, 14 sacks and eight passes broken up in 47 games played.

== Professional career ==
Pre-draft measurables
Height	Weight	Arm length	Hand span	Bench press
6 ft 5 3/8 in (1.97 m)	265 lb (120 kg)	34 1/2 in (0.88 m)	10 1/8 in (0.26 m)	25 reps
All values from Pro Day

=== Kansas City Chiefs ===
Ward was signed by the Kansas City Chiefs as an undrafted free agent on May 3, 2019. He spent his rookie season on the non-football injury list. Ward was cut at the end of training camp in 2020, but was re-signed to the Chiefs' practice squad shortly afterwards. He was signed to Kansas City's active roster on November 12, 2020. Ward made his NFL debut in Week 17 of the 2020 season against the Los Angeles Chargers, starting the game and finishing with five tackles, including his first career sack, in a 21–38 loss. He was waived on August 31, 2021.

=== New York Jets ===
Ward was claimed off waivers by the New York Jets on September 1, 2021. The Jets released him on August 16, 2022.

=== Green Bay Packers ===
On November 15, 2022, Ward was signed to the Green Bay Packers practice squad.

=== Houston Roughnecks ===
Ward was placed on the reserve list by the Houston Roughnecks of the XFL on April 28, 2023. The Roughnecks brand was transferred to the Houston Gamblers when the XFL and United States Football League (USFL) merged to create the United Football League (UFL).

=== DC Defenders ===
On January 5, 2024, Ward was selected by the DC Defenders during the 2024 UFL dispersal draft. He signed with the team on March 10. He was waived on March 21.

=== San Antonio Brahmas ===
Ward was claimed off waivers by the San Antonio Brahmas on March 21, 2024.

=== Hamilton Tiger-Cats ===
On August 27, 2024, Ward signed with the Hamilton Tiger-Cats of the Canadian Football League (CFL). He was released on October 21, 2024.
