= Emmanuel Smith =

American football player (born 1995)

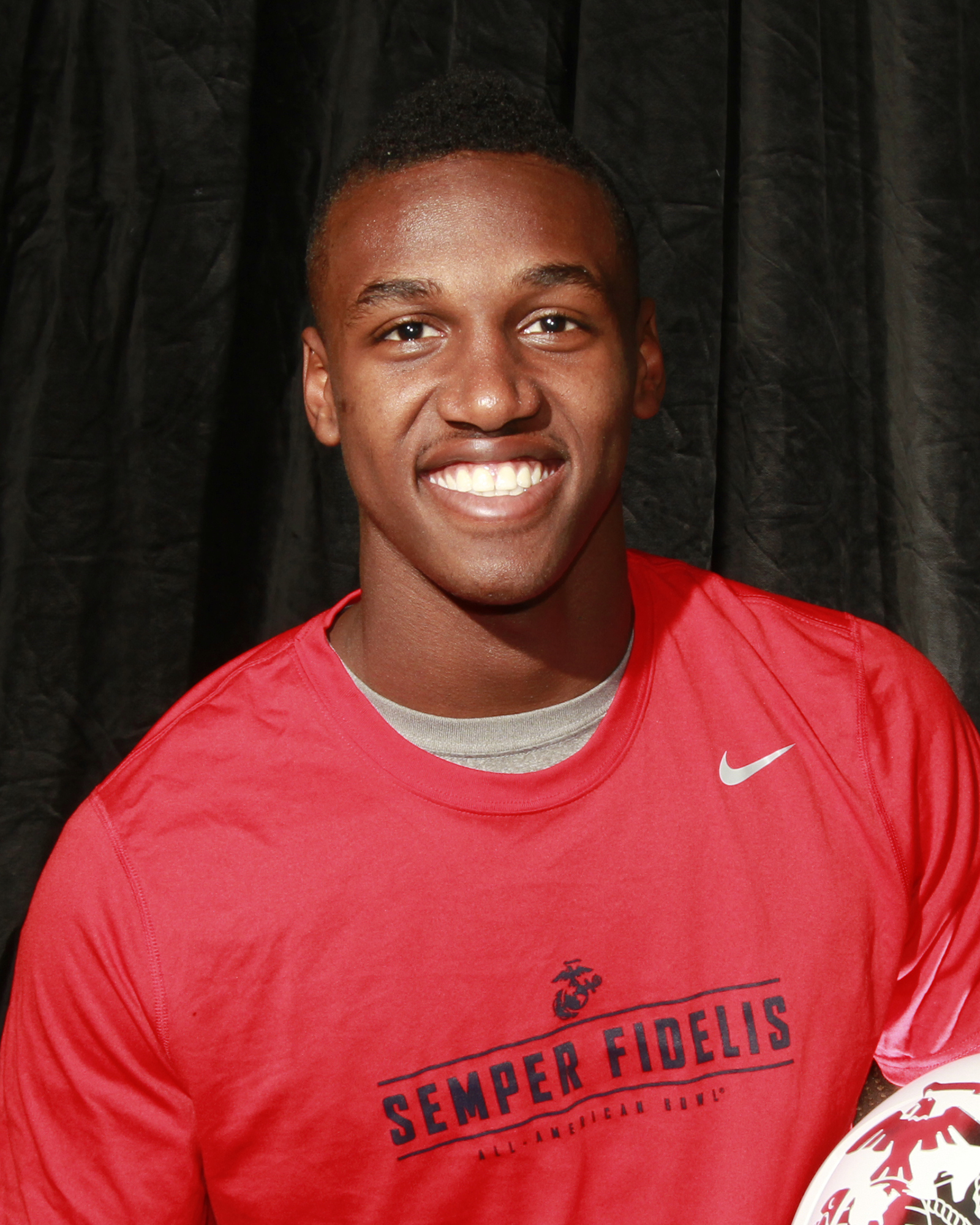
- Smith c. 2014

No. 43
- Position: Linebacker

Personal information
- Born: July 25, 1995 (age 31); Murfreesboro, Tennessee, U.S.
- Listed height: 6 ft 2 in (1.88 m)
- Listed weight: 240 lb (109 kg)

Career information
- High school: Oakland (Murfreesboro)
- College: Vanderbilt
- NFL draft: 2018: undrafted

Career history
- Atlanta Falcons (2018)*; Tampa Bay Buccaneers (2018–2019)*; Kansas City Chiefs (2019–2020); Seattle Sea Dragons (2023)
- * Offseason or practice squad member only

Awards and highlights
- Super Bowl champion (LIV)

Career NFL statistics
- Games played: 1
- Stats at Pro Football Reference

Emmanuel Smith (born July 25, 1995) is an American former professional football player who was a linebacker in the National Football League (NFL). After playing college football for the Vanderbilt Commodores, he signed with the Atlanta Falcons as an undrafted free agent in 2018.

== Professional career ==
=== Atlanta Falcons ===
Smith signed with the Atlanta Falcons as an undrafted free agent following the 2018 NFL draft on May 1, 2018. He was waived during final roster cuts on September 1, 2018.

=== Tampa Bay Buccaneers ===
Smith signed to the Tampa Bay Buccaneers' practice squad on December 11, 2018. He signed a reserve/futures contract with the team after the season on December 31, 2018. He was waived during final roster cuts on August 30, 2019.

=== Kansas City Chiefs ===
Smith signed to the Kansas City Chiefs' practice squad on September 2, 2019. He won Super Bowl LIV as a practice squad member with the Chiefs after they defeated the San Francisco 49ers 31–20. He re-signed with the Chiefs after the season on February 5, 2020.

Smith was waived/injured on August 27, 2020, and reverted to injured reserve the next day. He was waived from injured reserve with an injury settlement on September 4. He was re-signed to the team's practice squad on October 20, 2020. He was elevated to the active roster on December 19 for the team's week 15 game against the New Orleans Saints, and reverted to the practice squad after the game. He suffered a hamstring injury in the game, and was placed on the practice squad/injured list on December 26.

On February 9, 2021, Smith re-signed with the Chiefs. He was released on August 31, 2021.

=== Seattle Sea Dragons ===
On November 17, 2022, Smith was selected by the Seattle Sea Dragons of the XFL. He was placed on the team's reserve list on March 28, 2023. He was removed from the team roster in July 2023.
