= Frank Clark (American football) =

American football player (born 1993)

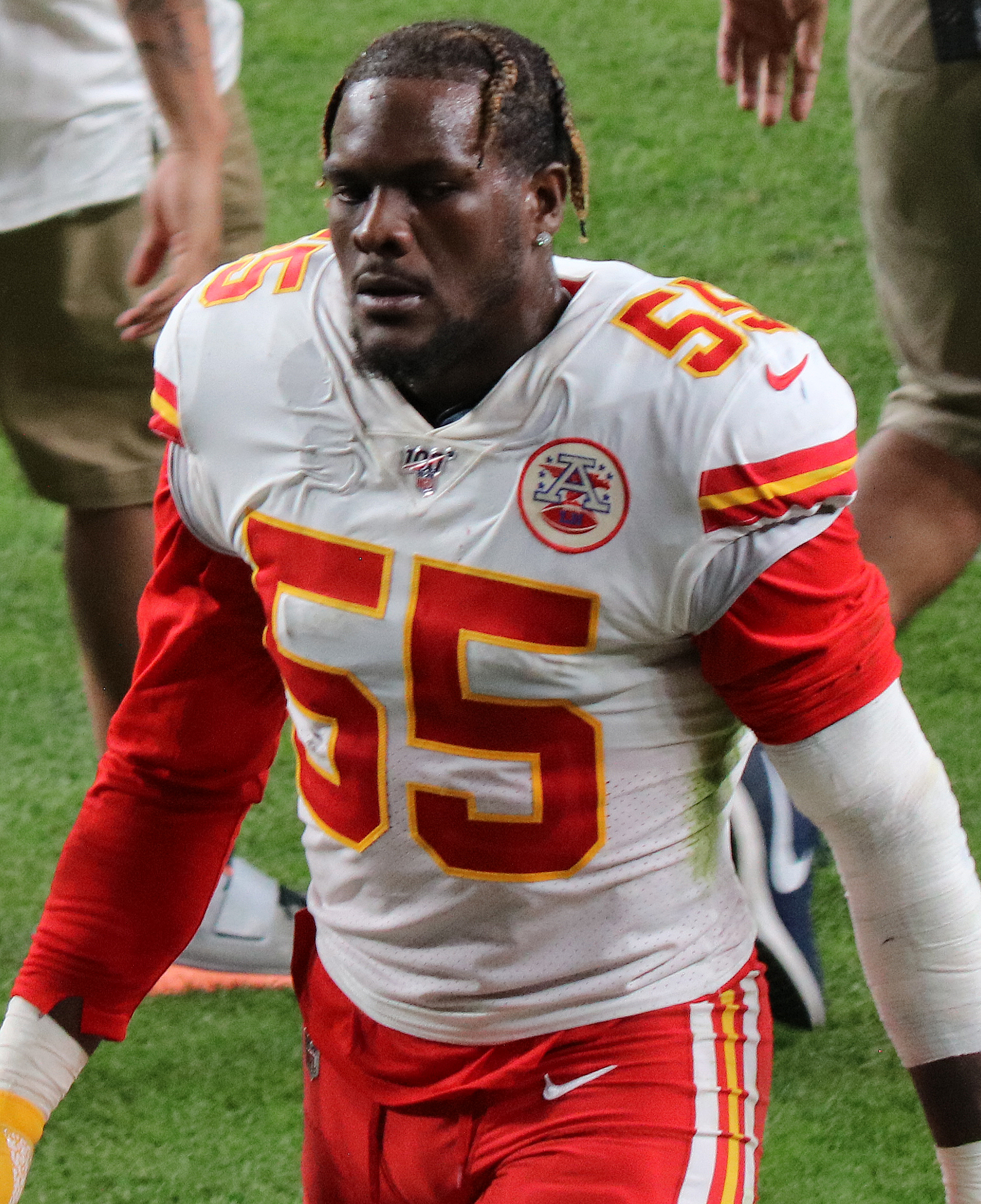
- Clark with the Kansas City Chiefs in 2019

No. 55, 57
- Positions: Linebacker, defensive end

Personal information
- Born: June 14, 1993 (age 33); Bakersfield, California, U.S.
- Listed height: 6 ft 3 in (1.91 m)
- Listed weight: 265 lb (120 kg)

Career information
- High school: Glenville (Cleveland, Ohio)
- College: Michigan (2011–2014)
- NFL draft: 2015: 2nd round, 63rd overall pick

Career history
- Seattle Seahawks (2015–2018); Kansas City Chiefs (2019–2022); Denver Broncos (2023); Seattle Seahawks (2023)

Awards and highlights
- 2× Super Bowl champion (LIV, LVII); 3× Pro Bowl (2019–2021); Second-team All-Big Ten (2013)

Career NFL statistics
- Tackles: 271
- Sacks: 58.5
- Forced fumbles: 14
- Fumble recoveries: 7
- Stats at Pro Football Reference

Frank Dominick Clark (born June 14, 1993), nicknamed "the Shark", is an American former professional football linebacker and defensive end. He played college football for the Michigan Wolverines, where he was All-Big Ten. Clark was selected by the Seattle Seahawks in the second round of the 2015 NFL draft. He has also played for the Denver Broncos and the Kansas City Chiefs, with whom he won two Super Bowls. In his postseason career, he has collected 13.5 sacks, third most in NFL history.

== Early life ==
In high school, Clark played numerous positions for head coach Ted Ginn Sr. at Glenville High School, but he was least interested in playing the position that Ginn felt he was most naturally suited to play (outside linebacker or defensive end). The position he was most interested in playing was safety. As a senior, he recorded 70 tackles and 19 sacks on defense, and caught 12 passes, including three for touchdowns on offense.

In track & field, Clark competed in events ranging from sprints, hurdles and jumps. He had bests of 23.5 seconds in the 200-meter dash, 15.53 seconds in the 110m hurdles, 39.55 seconds in the 300m hurdles, 1.88 meters (or 6–2) in the high jump, 6.37 meters (20–5) in the long jump and 13.07 meters (42–7.75) in the triple jump. He also ran the 40-yard dash in 4.53 seconds.

Clark was a three-star nationally rated player at outside linebacker, tight end, and defensive end. He signed his National Letter of Intent to attend Michigan on February 2, 2011.

College recruiting
Name	Hometown	School	Height	Weight	40^{‡}	Commit date
Frank Clark; TE/OLB/DE	Cleveland, Ohio	Glenville High School (OH)	6 ft 2.5 in (1.89 m)	207.5 lb (94.1 kg)	4.53	Feb 2, 2011
Frank Clark; TE/OLB/DE	Recruit ratings: Scout: Rivals: (77)					
Overall recruit ranking: Scout: 33 (TE) Rivals: 52 (OLB) ESPN: 83 (DE), 46 (OH)
Note: In many cases, Scout, Rivals, 247Sports, On3, and ESPN may conflict in their listings of height and weight.; In these cases, the average was taken. ESPN grades are on a 100-point scale.; Sources: "Michigan Football Commitments". Rivals.; "2011 Michigan Football Commits". Scout.; "ESPN". ESPN.; "Scout.com Team Recruiting Rankings". Scout.; "2011 Team Ranking". Rivals.com.

== College career ==
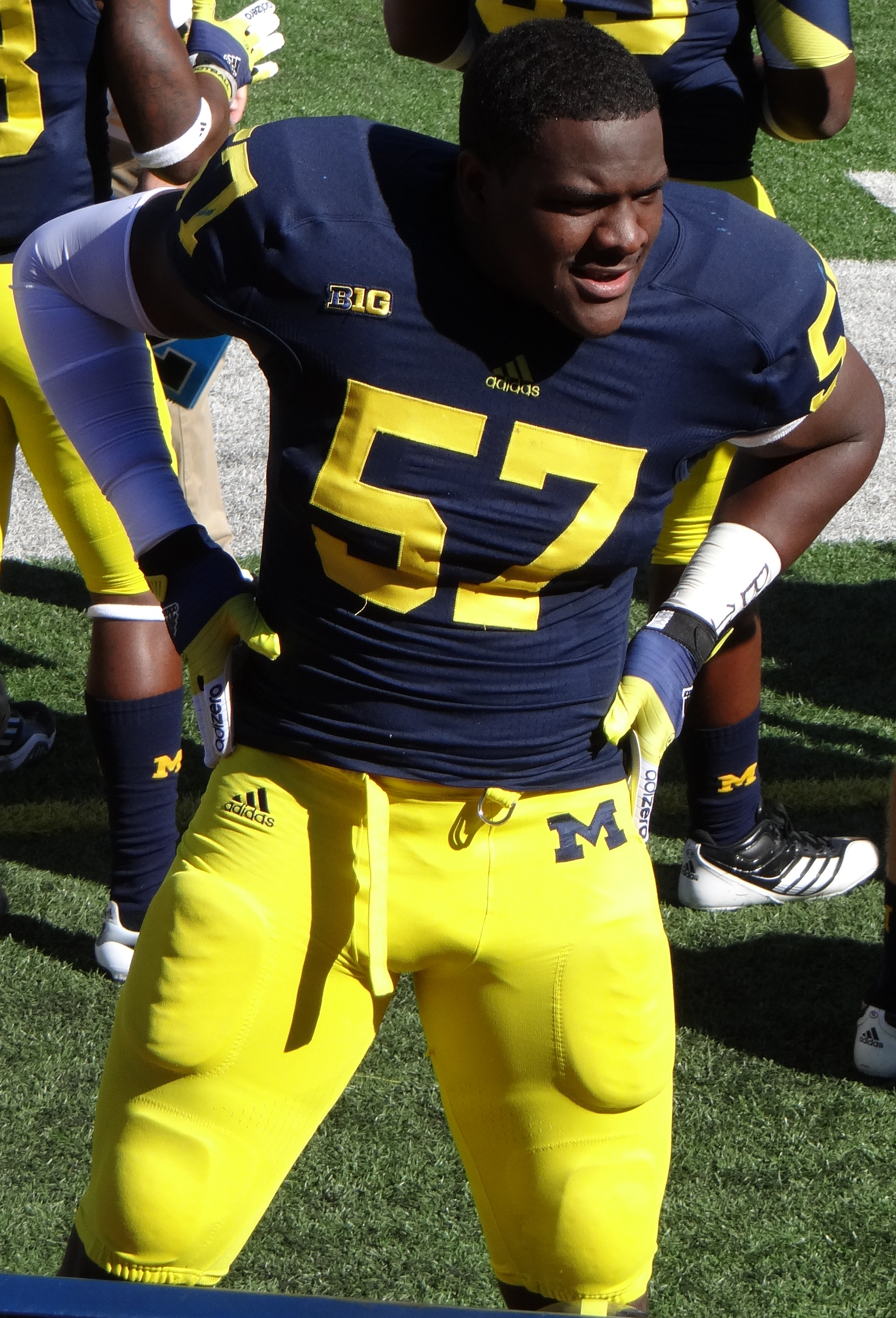
Clark with Michigan in 2012

As a freshman for the 2011 Wolverines, Clark had an interception that set up one of Michigan's two touchdowns in the January 3, 2012 Sugar Bowl against Virginia Tech. In the following offseason leading up to the season opener for the 2012 team against Alabama, Clark was suspended from the team for felony second-degree home invasion, for alleged theft of a MacBook Air. He was allowed to return to practice a few weeks later. He eventually pleaded guilty to the felony charge after missing one week. He was subject to punishment not more than 15 years in prison and $3,000 fine, but was eligible for sentencing under the Holmes Youthful Trainee Act, which would expunge the record upon satisfaction of probation requirements. Clark had quarterback sacks in each of the team's two final regular season games against Iowa and Ohio State.

In Clark's first two years at Michigan he added over 60 pounds (27.22 kg), without losing any speed. On September 21, he had 1.5 sacks against Connecticut, including one on third down during Connecticut's final possession as the 2013 Wolverines clung to a 24–21 lead. He also had two sacks against Penn State on October 12 and ran back a fumble recovery for a touchdown, although it was not enough to help Michigan avert its first loss of the season. Following the regular season, he was recognized as a second-team All-Big Ten selection by the coaches and an honorable mention selection by the media. On November 16, 2014, Clark was arrested for domestic violence and dismissed from the football team.

== Professional career ==
Pre-draft measurables
Height	Weight	Arm length	Hand span	Wingspan	40-yard dash	10-yard split	20-yard split	20-yard shuttle	Three-cone drill	Vertical jump	Broad jump	Bench press
6 ft 2 7/8 in (1.90 m)	271 lb (123 kg)	34 3/8 in (0.87 m)	10 1/8 in (0.26 m)	6 ft 11 7/8 in (2.13 m)	4.64 s	1.58 s	2.63 s	4.05 s	7.08 s	38.5 in (0.98 m)	9 ft 10 in (3.00 m)	19 reps
Values from NFL Combine and Michigan Pro Day.

=== Seattle Seahawks (first stint) ===
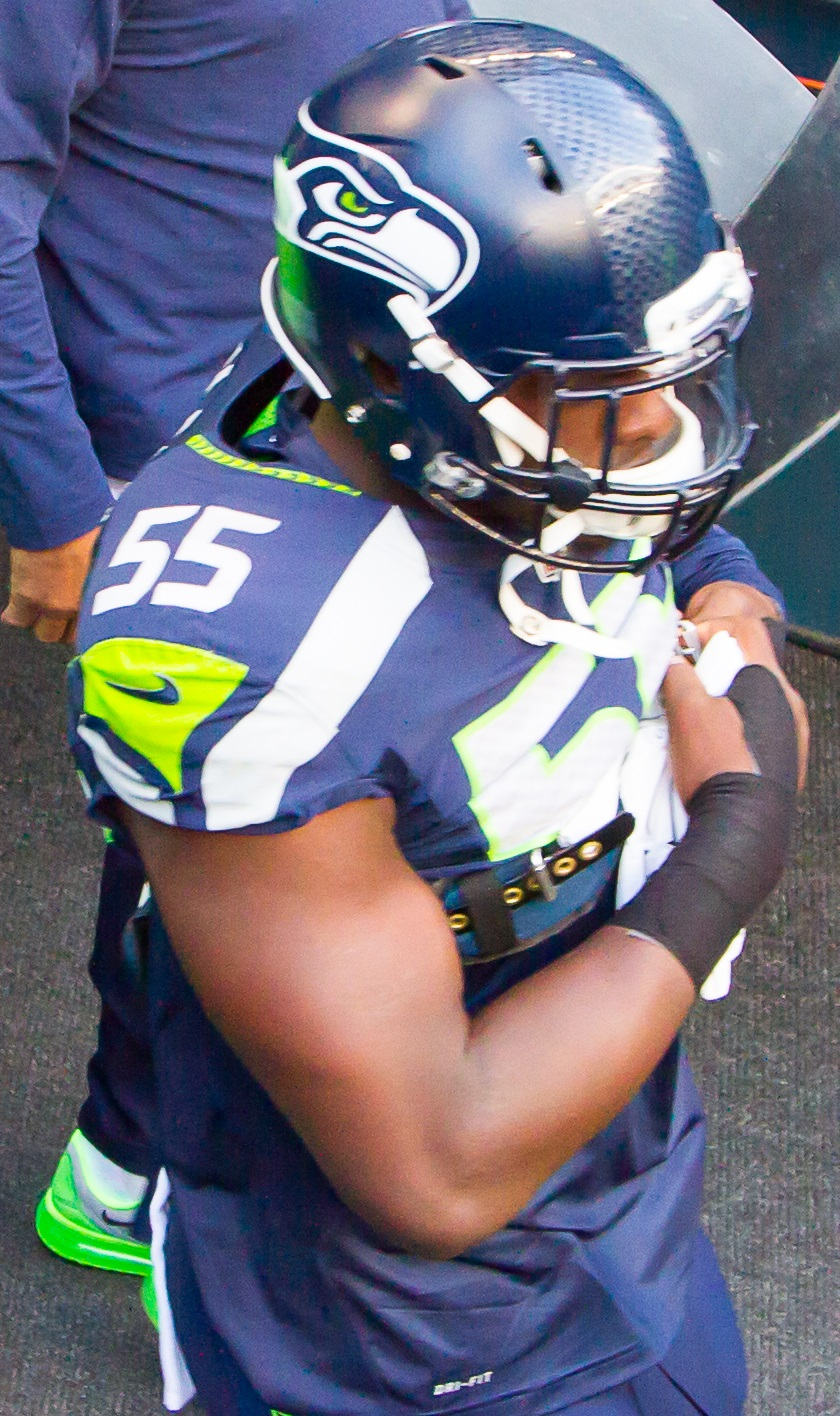
Clark playing for the Seahawks in his rookie season.

Clark was selected in the second round of the 2015 NFL draft with the 63rd overall selection by the Seattle Seahawks. With his selection he joined the Legion of Boom defense coming off back-to-back Super Bowl appearances. He spent the 2015 season as a backup to Michael Bennett and Cliff Avril at defensive end. Clark had 2 tackles in week 3 against the Chicago Bears on September 27. On November 29, Clark had a sack against the Pittsburgh Steelers. On December 6 against the Minnesota Vikings, Clark had 2 sacks. In the Divisional Round of the 2015–16 NFL playoffs against the Carolina Panthers, Clark had one sack in the 31–24 loss.

Clark finished the 2016 regular season with 10 sacks and two forced fumbles.

During the offseason on May 9, 2017, Clark was criticized for a tweet he directed at Bleacher Report journalist Natalie Weiner. Weiner had previously written about Clark's domestic violence arrest. Clark told Weiner that "People like you don't have long careers in your field. I have a job for you cleaning my fish tanks when that lil job is ova." In the 2017 season, he finished with nine sacks, 32 total tackles, two passes defensed, and two forced fumbles. In Week 6 of the 2018 season, Clark recorded 2.5 sacks on quarterback Derek Carr to along with four tackles in a 27–3 win over the Oakland Raiders, earning him NFC Defensive Player of the Week. He finished the season with 41 combined tackles, 13 sacks, two pass deflection, one interception, and three forced fumbles through 16 starts.

On March 4, 2019, the Seahawks placed the franchise tag on Clark.

=== Kansas City Chiefs ===
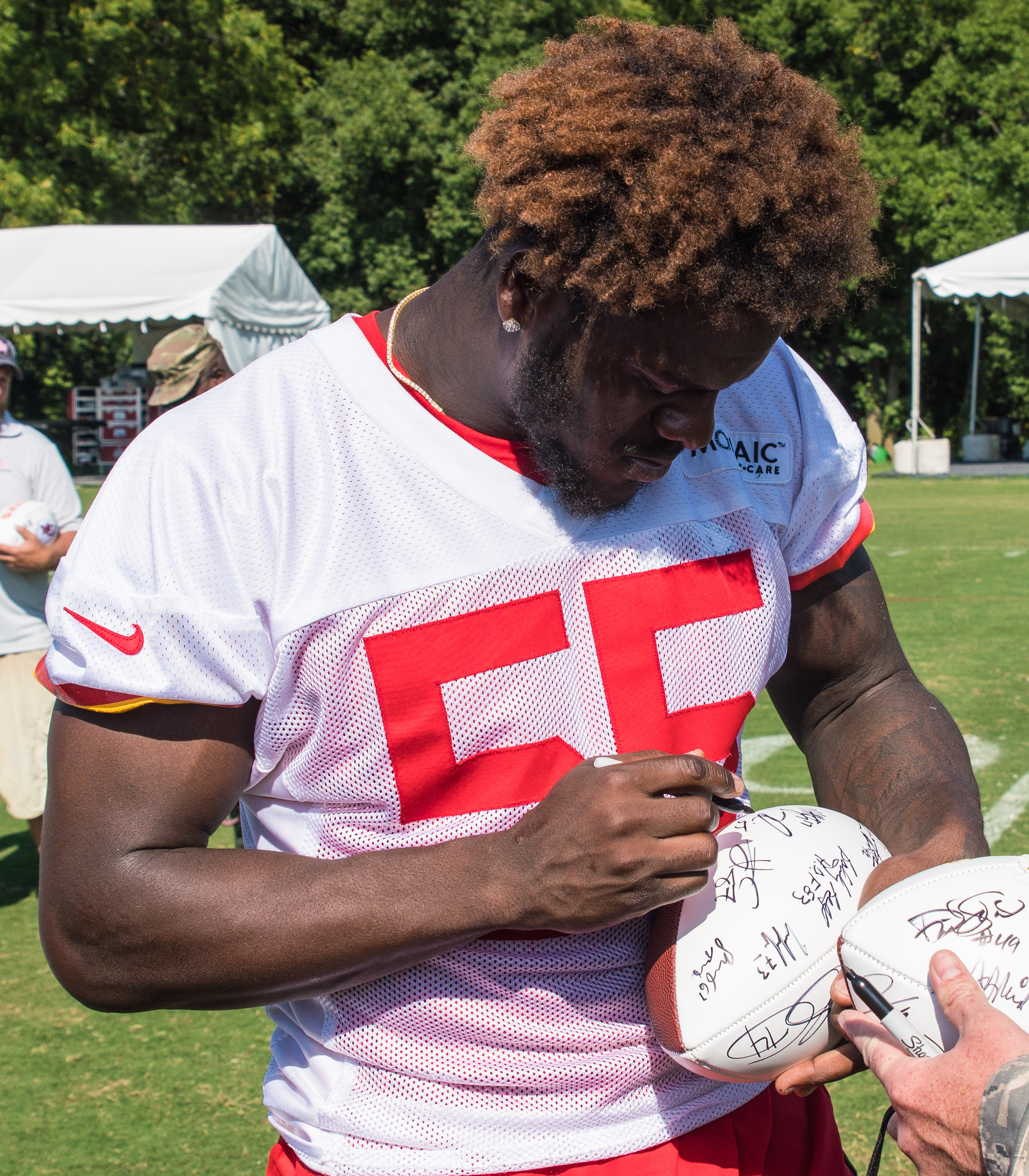
Clark signing an autograph at Chiefs' training camp in 2019

On April 23, 2019, Clark was traded to the Kansas City Chiefs along with the Seahawks' 3rd round selection in the 2019 NFL draft, in exchange for the Chiefs' 1st and 3rd round selections in the 2019 NFL draft and a conditional second-round selection (less favorable of Chiefs/49ers second-round picks) in the 2020 NFL draft. After the trade, he signed a five-year contract worth $105.5 million with $63.5 million guaranteed. Clark made his debut with the Chiefs in Week 1 against the Jacksonville Jaguars. In the game, Clark made one tackle and intercepted quarterback Gardner Minshew in the 40–26 win. In Week 3 against the Baltimore Ravens, Clark recorded his first sack of the season on Lamar Jackson in the 33–28 win. In Week 6 against the Houston Texans, Clark forced a fumble on Carlos Hyde and recovered the ball in the 31–24 loss. In Week 7 against the Denver Broncos, Clark recorded 2 sacks on Joe Flacco in the 30–6 win. Overall, Clark finished the 2019 season with 37 total tackles, eight sacks, four passes defensed, three forced fumbles, and one interception

In the Divisional Round of the playoffs against the Texans, Clark sacked Deshaun Watson three times during the 51–31 win. In the AFC Championship Game against the Tennessee Titans, Clark made a game ending sack on Ryan Tannehill on a fourth down late in the fourth quarter to seal a 35–24 Chiefs' win. In Super Bowl LIV against the San Francisco 49ers, Clark recorded a sack on Jimmy Garoppolo on a fourth down late in the fourth quarter during the 31–20 win.

Clark finished the 2020 season with 29 total tackles, six sacks, and two passes defensed in 15 games. In the AFC Championship against the Buffalo Bills, Clark recorded two sacks on Josh Allen during the 38–24 win. In Super Bowl LV against the Tampa Bay Buccaneers, Clark recorded one sack on Tom Brady during the 9–31 loss.

In 2021, Clark started 14 games and finished the season with 22 total tackles and 4.5 sacks. Clark was also selected to his third Pro Bowl.

In week 7 of the 2022 season, Clark recorded his first career safety, sacking Jimmy Garoppolo in the end zone. Two days later on October 25, 2022, he was suspended for two games for his arrest in June 2021. In the 2022 season, he finished with five sacks, 39 tackles, one pass defended, one forced fumble, and one fumble recovery. In the AFC Divisional Round, Clark recorded a sack in the Chiefs 27–20 victory over the Jaguars. In the AFC Championship Game, Clark recorded 1.5 sacks in the Chiefs 23–20 victory over the Cincinnati Bengals to avenge the loss from the previous year and reach Super Bowl LVII. In the Super Bowl, Clark recorded one tackle in the Chiefs 38–35 win over the Philadelphia Eagles. It was the Chiefs' second Super Bowl win in four years.

On March 7, 2023, the Chiefs released Clark.

=== Denver Broncos ===
Clark signed with the Broncos on June 13, 2023. He was released on October 14, 2023. He was released after being on the Broncos roster for 5 games, three of which he was inactive for. His short tenure with the Broncos ended with recording just two tackles.

=== Seattle Seahawks (second stint) ===
On October 26, 2023, the Seahawks signed Clark to a one-year deal. On December 30, the Seahawks waived Clark. He appeared in six games with the Seahawks.

== NFL career statistics ==
Legend
	Won the Super Bowl
**Bold**	Career high

=== Regular season ===
Year	Team	Games		Tackles				Fumbles			Interceptions					
Year	Team	GP	GS	Cmb	Solo	Ast	Sck	FF	FR	Yds	Int	Yds	Avg	Lng	TD	PD
2015	SEA	15	0	16	15	1	3.0	1	0	0	0	0	0.0	0	0	1
2016	SEA	15	5	**47**	25	**22**	10.0	2	1	**27**	0	0	0.0	0	0	0
2017	SEA	16	12	32	19	13	9.0	2	1	0	0	0	0.0	0	0	2
2018	SEA	16	16	41	**33**	8	**13.0**	**3**	**2**	0	**1**	**26**	**26.0**	**26**	0	3
2019	KC	14	11	37	27	10	8.0	**3**	1	0	**1**	5	5.0	5	0	**4**
2020	KC	15	15	29	21	8	6.0	0	1	14	0	0	0.0	0	0	2
2021	KC	14	14	22	15	7	4.5	2	0	0	0	0	0.0	0	0	0
2022	KC	15	15	39	25	14	5.0	1	1	0	0	0	0.0	0	0	1
2023	DEN	2	0	2	2	0	0.0	0	0	0	0	0	0.0	0	0	0
2023	SEA	6	0	6	2	4	0.0	0	0	0	0	0	0.0	0	0	0
Total		128	88	271	184	87	58.5	14	7	41	2	31	15.5	26	0	13

=== Playoffs ===
Year	Team	Games		Tackles				Fumbles			Interceptions					
Year	Team	GP	GS	Cmb	Solo	Ast	Sck	FF	FR	Yds	Int	Yds	Avg	Lng	TD	PD
2015	SEA	2	0	3	2	1	1.0	0	0	0	0	0	0.0	0	0	**1**
2016	SEA	2	0	1	1	0	1.0	**1**	0	0	0	0	0.0	0	0	0
2018	SEA	1	1	4	2	2	1.0	0	0	0	0	0	0.0	0	0	0
2019	KC	3	3	**9**	**6**	3	**5.0**	0	0	0	0	0	0.0	0	0	0
2020	KC	3	3	**9**	5	**4**	3.0	0	0	0	0	0	0.0	0	0	0
2021	KC	3	3	7	4	3	0.0	0	**1**	0	0	0	0.0	0	0	0
2022	KC	3	3	7	**6**	1	2.5	0	0	0	0	0	0.0	0	0	0
Total		17	13	40	26	14	13.5	1	1	0	0	0	0.0	0	0	1

== Legal trouble ==
While at Michigan in 2012, Clark was arrested for felony home-invasion charges.

During Michigan's 2014 season, Clark was arrested for domestic violence. He said at the time of his arrest that he and his girlfriend got into an argument in a hotel room in Sandusky, Ohio, but that he didn't touch her. The officer who responded said that Clark had an injury on his nose and determined he was intoxicated at the time of his arrest. A lamp in the hotel room was damaged and his girlfriend had a large welt on the side of her cheek and marks on her neck, as well as what appeared to be a rug burn. She reportedly threw a remote at Clark during the argument, to which Clark responded by restraining her on the bed. She bit his nose to try to get free, after which he shoved her head into the bed but she got free. After getting free Clark reportedly punched her. As she was trying to leave the room, she threw the alarm clock at Clark. Clark pleaded guilty to a charge of disorderly conduct but had the assault charges dropped. He was required to pay a $350 fine and was sentenced to a three-day jail sentence, but was given credit for time already served after his arrest. He was also dismissed from the football team.

On June 20, 2021, Clark was arrested in Los Angeles for felony firearm possession. He was pulled over by police on suspicion of a vehicle code violation. Police noticed a bag with an uzi sitting in the backseat. He was released the following day on bond. After the arrest, it was reported that he was also arrested on a gun charge in March 2021. He was charged with felony possession of an assault weapon, which carries a maximum penalty of three years in prison. He pled no contest to the charges and was sentenced to one year of probation and 40 hours of community service on September 8, 2022.
