= 2019 Kansas City Chiefs season =

60th season in franchise history; third Super Bowl appearance and second win

- Chiefs 60th season logo
- Owner: The Hunt family (Clark Hunt Chairman and CEO)
- General manager: Brett Veach
- Head coach: Andy Reid
- Offensive coordinator: Eric Bieniemy
- Defensive coordinator: Steve Spagnuolo
- Home stadium: Arrowhead Stadium

Results
- Record: 12–4
- Division place: 1st AFC West
- Playoffs: Won Divisional Playoffs (vs. Texans) 51–31; Won AFC Championship (vs. Titans) 35–24; Won Super Bowl LIV (vs. 49ers) 31–20
- All-Pros: 5: SS Tyrann Mathieu (1st team); TE Travis Kelce (2nd team); RT Mitchell Schwartz (2nd team); S Tyrann Mathieu (2nd team); KR Mecole Hardman (2nd team)
- Pro Bowlers: 6: Selected but did not participate due to participation in Super Bowl LIV: QB Patrick Mahomes; WR Tyreek Hill; TE Travis Kelce; DE Frank Clark; DT Chris Jones; RS Mecole Hardman
- Team MVP: Tyrann Mathieu
- Team ROY: Mecole Hardman

Uniform
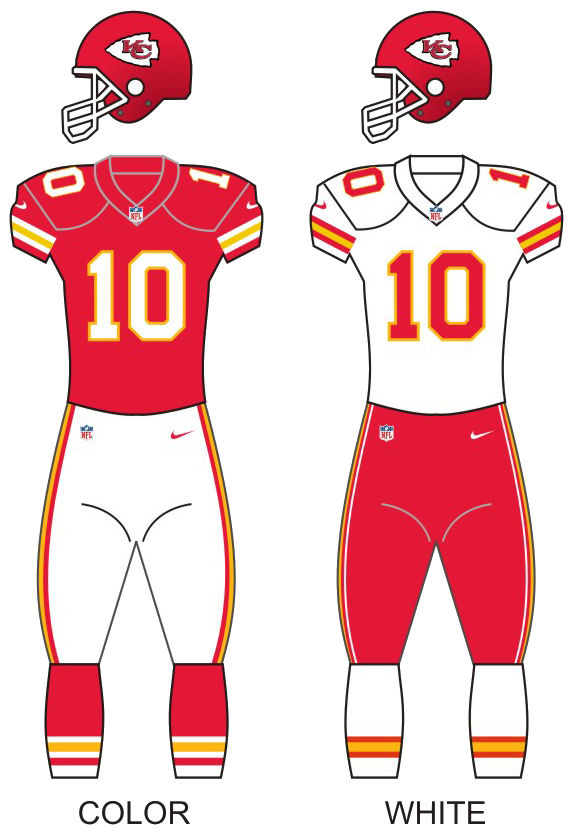

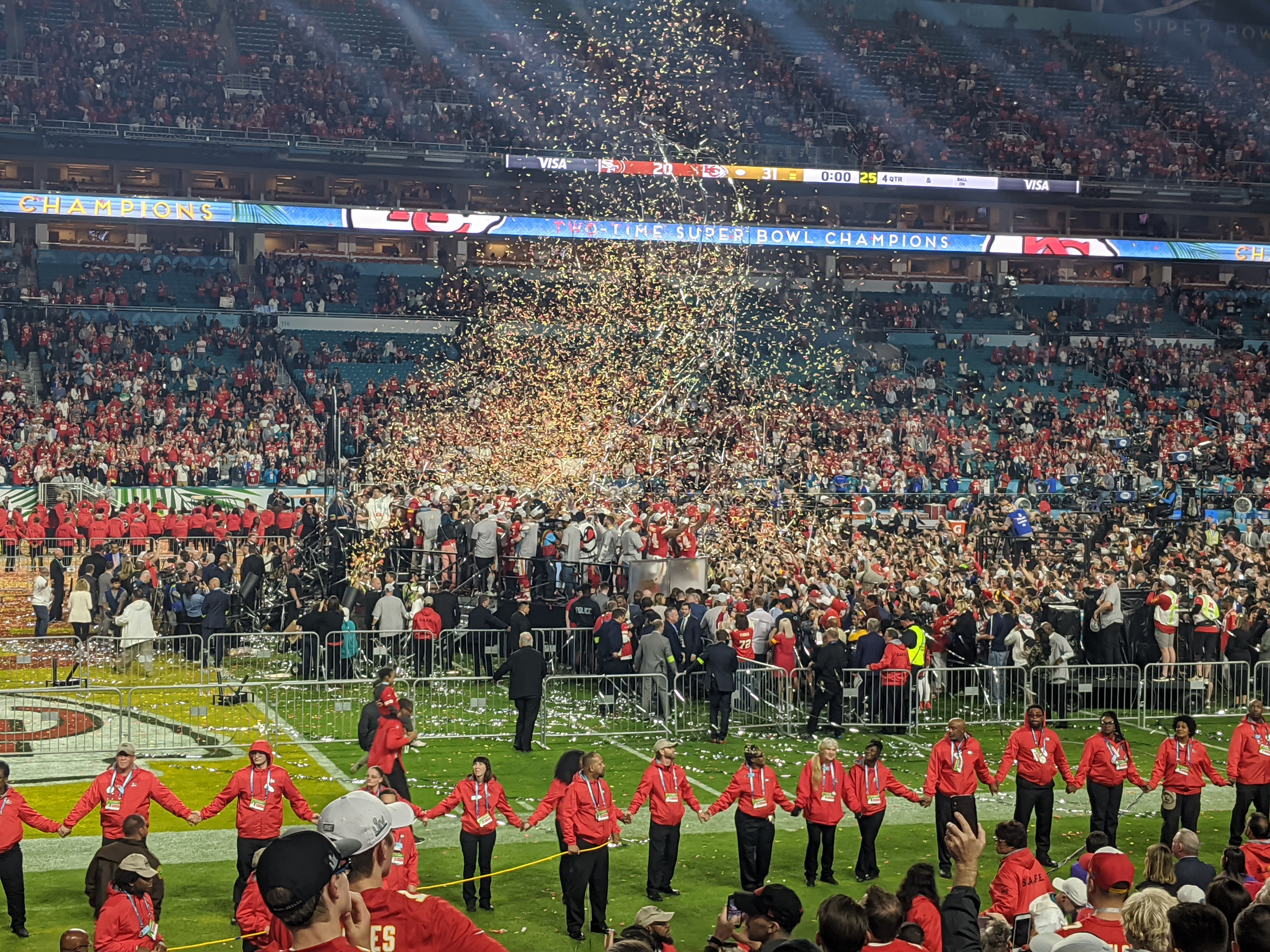
Lombardi Trophy presentation at Super Bowl LIV

The 2019 season was the Kansas City Chiefs' 50th in the National Football League (NFL), their 60th overall, their seventh under head coach Andy Reid and third under general manager Brett Veach.

In the offseason, the Chiefs released two of their longest tenured players: Justin Houston and Eric Berry. The Chiefs started the season with a 1–3 record at home, their worst record after four home games since 2012. However, they began the season 4–0 on the road, their best road record after four road games since 2013. With a Week 14 Oakland Raiders loss and a win over the New England Patriots, the Chiefs clinched the AFC West, extending their team record division title streak to four consecutive. They also clinched the franchise's fifth consecutive playoff appearance, one short of the franchise record of six consecutive from 1990–1995. The Chiefs also finished undefeated in the AFC West for the second time under Andy Reid, extending their record within the AFC West since 2015 to 27–3. They clinched their second straight bye to the divisional round of the AFC playoffs due to a Week 17 win against the Los Angeles Chargers combined with a Patriots loss to the Miami Dolphins.

In the divisional round, the Chiefs defeated the Houston Texans 51–31 despite falling behind 24–0 in the second quarter to give the Chiefs playoff wins in back-to-back seasons for the first time in franchise history. The 51 points they scored was a franchise record for a postseason game. The win, along with the Baltimore Ravens' loss the previous night, allowed the Chiefs to host the AFC Championship for the second time in franchise history. They defeated the Tennessee Titans 35–24 in the AFC Championship advancing to Super Bowl LIV, where they defeated the San Francisco 49ers 31–20 to win their first championship since Super Bowl IV in 1970.

== NFL Top 100 ==
The Chiefs had six players ranked on NFL Network's annual Top 100 players countdown, which was tied for second most in the league. Reigning NFL MVP Patrick Mahomes was ranked 4th, the highest ranking ever by a Chiefs player. Additionally, he was the highest ranked player on the countdown that was not ranked in 2018 and was the second highest player ever that was unranked the previous season.

Rank	Player	Position	Change
4	Patrick Mahomes	QB	NR
19	Tyreek Hill	WR	▲21
21	Travis Kelce	TE	▲3
36	Chris Jones	DT	NR
85	Frank Clark	DE	NR
94	Mitchell Schwartz	T	NR

== Staff ==
=== Coaching changes ===
2019 Kansas City Chiefs Staff Changes
Coach	Position	Reason left	Replacement
Bob Sutton	Defensive Coordinator	Fired	Steve Spagnuolo
Britt Reid	Defensive line	Promoted	Brendan Daly
Mike Smith	Outside linebackers	Accepted job with another team	Britt Reid
Mark DeLeone	Inside Linebackers	Accepted job with another team	Matt House (as linebackers coach)
Emmitt Thomas	Defensive backs	Retired	Dave Merritt
Al Harris	Cornerbacks	Fired	Sam Madison
Jay Valai	Defensive quality control	Accepted job with another team	Alex Whittingham

=== Staff ===
2019 Kansas City Chiefs staff
Front office: Chairman/CEO – Clark Hunt; President – Mark Donovan; General manager – Brett Veach; Director of football administration – Brandt Tilis; Salary cap & legal executive – Chris Shea; Director of player personnel – Mike Borgonzi; Director of college scouting – Ryan Poles; Assistant director of college scouting – Ryne Nutt; College Scouting Coordinator – Greg Castillo; Director of pro personnel – Tim Terry; Head coaches: Head coach – Andy Reid; Assistant head coach/special teams coordinator – Dave Toub; Offensive coaches: Offensive coordinator – Eric Bieniemy; Quarterbacks – Mike Kafka; Running backs – Deland McCullough; Wide receivers – Greg Lewis; Tight ends – Tom Melvin; Offensive line – Andy Heck; Assistant offensive line – Corey Matthaei; Pass game analyst/assistant quarterbacks – Joe Bleymaier; Offensive quality control – David Girardi	Defensive coaches: Defensive coordinator – Steve Spagnuolo; Run game coordinator/defensive line – Brendan Daly; Outside linebackers – Britt Reid; Linebackers – Matt House; Defensive backs – Dave Merritt; Cornerbacks – Sam Madison; Defensive quality control – Alex Whittingham; Defensive assistant – Connor Embree; Defensive quality control – Terry Bradden; Special teams coaches: Assistant special teams – Rod Wilson; Strength and conditioning: Strength and conditioning – Barry Rubin; Assistant strength and conditioning – Travis Crittenden; Assistant strength and conditioning – Devin Woodhouse; Sports science/conditioning – Ryan Reynolds

== Roster changes ==
=== Players signed ===
Below are players signed in the offseason through free agency.

Players signed
Player	Position
Justin Senior	T
Sammie Coates	WR
Davon Grayson	WR
Dontae Johnson	CB
E. J. Manuel	QB
Harold Jones-Quartey	S
Carlos Hyde	RB
Tyrann Mathieu	S
Damien Wilson	LB
Alex Okafor	DE
Bashaud Breeland	CB
Blake Bell	TE
Keith Reaser	CB
Jeremiah Attaochu	LB
Zack Golditch	G
Nick Keizer	TE
Neal Sterling	TE

=== Cuts ===
Below are players who were released during the offseason

Players cut
Player	Position
Justin Houston	LB
Eric Berry	S
Dillon Gordon	T
Step Durham	CB
Tejan Koroma	C
Sammie Coates	WR
T.J. Linta	QB
Dontae Johnson	CB
Jarvis Jenkins	DE
Leon McQuay III	FS
Justin Senior	OT
Gary Johnson	OLB
James Williams	RB

=== Futures contracts ===
Below are players that were signed as a futures players, which are typically players that have not played in a regular season. These players usually spent the previous season on a practice squad.

Futures contracts
Player	Position
Josh Crockett	WR
Raymond Davison	LB
Ryan Hunter	T
Joey Ivie	NT
Chase Litton	QB
Robert McCray	OLB
Leon McQuay III	SS
Henry Mondeaux	DT
Pace Murphy	T
Aaron Ripkowski	FB
Martrell Spaight	LB
D'Montre Wade	CB
Cavon Walker	DE
David Wells	TE

=== Unrestricted free agents ===
Below are players with expiring contracts that can sign with any team without the Chiefs receiving any sort of compensation. Also included is if the player re-signed with the Chiefs or signed with another team.

UFAs
Player	Position	Re-signed?*
Jeff Allen	G	Yes
Allen Bailey	DE	No
Kelvin Benjamin	WR	No
Chris Conley	WR	No
Jordan Devey	G	No
Demetrius Harris	TE	No
Mitch Morse	C	No
Steven Nelson	CB	No
Orlando Scandrick	CB	No
Anthony Sherman	FB	Yes
De'Anthony Thomas	WR	Yes
Spencer Ware	RB	No
Charcandrick West	RB	No
Frank Zombo	OLB	No

Signed with new team	Re-signed

*As of August 20

=== Restricted free agents ===
Below are players with expiring contracts that have three or fewer accrued seasons with the Chiefs that can receive a qualifying offer from any NFL team, the Chiefs can choose to either match the offer or receive a draft pick as compensation depending on the tender placed by the Chiefs which can be 1st round, 2nd, or original round (the pick that was used to draft the player). If no offer sheet is given, the player will receive a one-year contract with the Chiefs for a salary based on the tender placed on the player, $2.879 million for a first, $2.023 million for a second, or $1.323 million for an original round tender. If a tender is not placed, the player becomes an unrestricted free agent.

RFAs
Player	Position	Tender	Qualifying offer	Matched?*
Jordan Lucas	FS	Original round (6th)	None; Signed tender	N/A
Terrance Smith	ILB	Not placed	None	N/A

*As of April 15

=== Exclusive-rights free agents ===
Below are players with two or fewer seasons of tenure with expiring contracts. If the Chiefs makes a qualifying offer (a one-year contract usually at league-minimum salary) the player has no negotiating rights with other teams, and must either sign the tender with the Chiefs or sit out the 2019 season. If a qualifying offer is not made, the player is an unrestricted free agent.

ERFAs
Player	Position	Qualifying offer?*	Signed?†
Harrison Butker	K	Yes	Yes
Alex Ellis	TE	No	N/A
Justin Hamilton	NT	Yes	Yes
Marcus Kemp	WR	Yes	Yes

*As of March 13
†As of April 15

=== Trades ===
Below are any trades that included at least one player. Trades that featured only draft picks being traded for both teams, are listed in NFL Draft section.

Trades
Player(s)/Pick(s) Received	Team	Compensation
2nd round pick 2020 NFL draft	San Francisco 49ers	LB Dee Ford
DE Emmanuel Ogbah	Cleveland Browns	S Eric Murray
DE Frank Clark; 3rd round pick 2019 Draft	Seattle Seahawks	1st & 3rd round pick 2019 NFL Draft; 2nd round pick 2020 NFL Draft
LB Darron Lee	New York Jets	6th round pick 2020 NFL Draft

=== Draft ===
2019 Kansas City Chiefs Draft
Round	Selection	Player	Position	College
2	56	Mecole Hardman	Wide receiver	Georgia
2	63	Juan Thornhill	Safety	Virginia
3	84	Khalen Saunders	Defensive tackle	Western Illinois
6	201	Rashad Fenton	Cornerback	South Carolina
6	214*	Darwin Thompson	Running back	Utah State
7	216	Nick Allegretti	Guard	Illinois

*	Compensatory selection

Draft pick trades

- The Chiefs received a sixth round pick in the 2018 NFL draft and a second round pick in the 2019 NFL Draft in exchange for cornerback Marcus Peters and a fourth round pick in the 2018 NFL Draft.
- The Chiefs traded a fourth round pick in the 2019 NFL Draft in exchange for linebacker Reggie Ragland.
- The Chiefs traded wide receiver Rod Streater and a seventh round pick in the 2019 NFL Draft to the San Francisco 49ers in exchange for a seventh round pick in the 2019 NFL Draft.
- The Chiefs traded their first round (29th overall) in the 2019 NFL Draft, their third round (92nd overall) selection in the 2019 Draft, and a 2nd round selection in the 2020 draft to the Seattle Seahawks in exchange for defensive end Frank Clark and the Seahawks 3rd round selection (84th overall) in the 2019 NFL Draft.
- The Chiefs traded a second round selection (61st overall) and their 5th round selection (167th overall) to Los Angeles Rams in exchange for the Rams 2nd round selection (56th overall)

== Final roster ==
2019 Kansas City Chiefs roster
Quarterbacks (QB): 4 Chad Henne; 15 Patrick Mahomes; 8 Matt Moore; Running backs (RB): 25 LeSean McCoy; 42 Anthony Sherman FB; 34 Darwin Thompson; 26 Damien Williams; Wide receivers (WR): 17 Mecole Hardman; 10 Tyreek Hill; 13 Byron Pringle; 11 Demarcus Robinson; 14 Sammy Watkins; Tight ends (TE): 81 Blake Bell; 87 Travis Kelce; 82 Deon Yelder	Offensive linemen (OL): 73 Nick Allegretti G; 68 Jackson Barton RT; 76 Laurent Duvernay-Tardif LG; 75 Cameron Erving LT; 72 Eric Fisher T; 62 Austin Reiter C; 71 Mitchell Schwartz RT; 61 Stefen Wisniewski C; 77 Andrew Wylie RG; Defensive linemen (DL): 55 Frank Clark DE; 52 Demone Harris DE; 95 Chris Jones DT; 92 Tanoh Kpassagnon DE; 91 Derrick Nnadi DT; 64 Mike Pennel DT; 99 Khalen Saunders DT; 94 Terrell Suggs DE; 98 Xavier Williams DT	Linebackers (LB): 53 Anthony Hitchens OLB; 50 Darron Lee OLB; 56 Ben Niemann MLB; 44 Dorian O'Daniel OLB; 59 Reggie Ragland MLB; 54 Damien Wilson OLB; Defensive backs (DB): 21 Bashaud Breeland CB; 30 Alex Brown CB; 20 Morris Claiborne CB; 27 Rashad Fenton CB; 29 Kendall Fuller CB; 24 Jordan Lucas SS; 32 Tyrann Mathieu SS; 49 Daniel Sorensen FS; 22 Juan Thornhill FS; 35 Charvarius Ward CB; 23 Armani Watts FS; Special teams (ST): 7 Harrison Butker K; 2 Dustin Colquitt P; 41 James Winchester LS	Practice squad: 12 Gehrig Dieter WR; 1 Jody Fortson TE; 96 Braxton Hoyett DT; 60 Ryan Hunter G; 48 Nick Keizer TE; 38 Chris Lammons CB; 93 Devaroe Lawrence DT; 30 Elijah McGuire RB; 9 Kyle Shurmur QB; 43 Emmanuel Smith OLB; Reserve: 80 Felton Davis WR (IR); 47 Darius Harris OLB (NF-Inj.); 19 Marcus Kemp WR (IR); 40 John Lovett TE (IR); 97 Alex Okafor DE (IR); 90 Emmanuel Ogbah DE (IR); 74 Martinas Rankin G (IR); 20 Keith Reaser CB (IR); 70 Greg Senat LT (IR); 57 Breeland Speaks DE (IR); 79 Tim Ward DE (NF-Inj.); 39 Spencer Ware RB (IR); 88 David Wells TE (IR); 31 Darrel Williams RB (IR); Rookies in italics 53 active, 14 reserve, 10 practice squad

== Preseason ==
=== Schedule ===
Week	Date	Opponent	Result	Record	Venue	Recap
1	August 10	Cincinnati Bengals	W 38–17	1–0	Arrowhead Stadium	Recap
2	August 17	at Pittsburgh Steelers	L 7–17	1–1	Heinz Field	Recap
3	August 24	San Francisco 49ers	L 17–27	1–2	Arrowhead Stadium	Recap
4	August 29	at Green Bay Packers	L 20–27	1–3	Lambeau Field	Recap

=== Game summaries ===
==== Week 1: vs. Cincinnati Bengals ====
Week 1: Cincinnati Bengals at Kansas City Chiefs – Game summary

Quarter	1	2	3	4	Total
Bengals	7	0	3	7	17
Chiefs	7	10	14	7	38

at Arrowhead Stadium, Kansas City, Missouri

- Date: August 10
- Game time: 7:00 p.m. CDT
- Game weather: 91 °F (33 °C)
- Game attendance: 69,813
- Referee: Craig Wrolstad
- Recap, Game Book

Game information

First quarter

- CIN – Trayveon Williams 1-yard run (Randy Bullock kick), 7:45. Bengals 7–0. Drive: 14 plays, 75 yards, 7:15.
- KC – Carlos Hyde 1-yard run (Harrison Butker kick), 3:58. Tied 7–7. Drive: 7 plays, 83 yards, 3:47.

Second quarter

- KC – Mecole Hardman 17-yard pass from Kyle Shurmur (Harrison Butker kick), 11:45. Chiefs 14–7. Drive: 11 plays, 75 yards, 5:13.
- KC – Harrison Butker 35-yard field goal, 0:50. Chiefs 17–7. Drive: 8 plays, 44 yards, 2:30.

Third quarter

- KC – Darwin Thompson 29-yard pass from Chase Litton (Harrison Butker kick), 12:39. Chiefs 24–7. Drive: 1 play, 19 yards, 0:55.
- CIN – Tristan Vizcaino 47-yard field goal, 10:21. Chiefs 24–10. Drive: 7 plays, 30 yards, 2:18.
- KC – Deon Yelder 14-yard pass from Chase Litton (Harrison Butker kick), 1:03. Chiefs 31–10. Drive: 3 plays, 35 yards, 1:26.

Fourth quarter

- CIN – Jordan Ellis 10-yard pass from Ryan Finley (Tristan Vizcaino kick), 11:22. Chiefs 31–17. Drive: 9 plays, 67 yards, 4:41.
- KC – Josh Caldwell 4-yard run (Harrison Butker kick), 1:56. Chiefs 38–17. Drive: 4 plays, 54 yards, 1:22.

Top passers

- CIN – Ryan Finley – 13/18, 109 yards, TD, INT
- KC – Chase Litton – 11/15, 122 yards, 2 TD, INT

Top rushers

- CIN – Jordan Ellis – 3 rushes, 11 yards
- KC – Josh Caldwell – 4 rushes, 59 yards, TD

Top receivers

- CIN – Jordan Ellis – 5 receptions, 44 yards, TD
- KC – Blake Bell – 2 receptions, 37 yards

==== Week 2: at Pittsburgh Steelers ====
Week 2: Kansas City Chiefs at Pittsburgh Steelers – Game summary

Quarter	1	2	3	4	Total
Chiefs	0	7	0	0	7
Steelers	0	7	0	10	17

at Heinz Field, Pittsburgh, Pennsylvania

- Date: August 17
- Game time: 7:30 pm. EDT/6:30 pm. CDT
- Game weather: Partly cloudy, 86 °F (30 °C)
- Game attendance: 50,668
- Referee: Tony Corrente
- Recap, Game Book

Game information

First quarter

- No scoring plays.

Second quarter

- PIT – Jaylen Samuels 14-yard run (Chris Boswell kick), 6:39. Steelers 7–0. Drive: 14 plays, 89 yards, 8:06.
- KC – Mecole Hardman 17-yard pass from Chad Henne (Harrison Butker kick), 1:11. Tied 7–7. Drive: 13 plays, 81 yards, 5:28.

Third quarter

- No scoring plays.

Fourth quarter

- PIT – Matthew Wright 46-yard field goal, 12:47. Steelers 10–7. Drive: 12 plays, 32 yards, 6:59.
- PIT – Diontae Johnson 24-yard pass from Devlin Hodges (Chris Boswell kick), 4:22. Steelers 17–7. Drive: 10 plays, 80 yards, 5:48.

Top passers

- KC – Chad Henne – 7/14, 96 yards, TD
- PIT – Joshua Dobbs – 6/11, 95 yards, INT

Top rushers

- KC – Darwin Thompson – 4 rushes, 30 yards
- PIT – James Conner – 6 rushes, 28 yards

Top receivers

- KC – Cody Thompson – 7 receptions, 69 yards
- PIT – James Washington – 4 receptions, 78 yards

==== Week 3: vs. San Francisco 49ers ====
Week 3: San Francisco 49ers at Kansas City Chiefs – Game summary

Quarter	1	2	3	4	Total
49ers	7	6	0	14	27
Chiefs	7	3	7	0	17

at Arrowhead Stadium, Kansas City, Missouri

- Date: August 24
- Game time: 7:00 p.m. CDT
- Game weather: 76 °F (24 °C)
- Game attendance: 73,027
- Referee: John Hussey
- Recap, Game Book

Game information

First quarter

- KC – Damien Williams 62-yard pass from Patrick Mahomes (Harrison Butker kick), 8:25. Chiefs 7–0. Drive: 3 plays, 69 yards, 1:30.
- SF – Matt Breida 20-yard pass from Jimmy Garoppolo (Robbie Gould kick), 4:14. Tied 7–7. Drive: 7 plays, 78 yards, 4:11.

Second quarter

- KC – Harrison Butker 25-yard field goal, 12:38. Chiefs 10–7. Drive: 12 plays, 68 yards, 6:36.
- SF – Robbie Gould 29-yard field goal, 3:10. Tied 10–10. Drive: 11 plays, 75 yards, 5:44.
- SF – Robbie Gould 35-yard field goal, 0:08. 49ers 13–10. Drive: 7 plays, 43 yards, 1:37.

Third quarter

- KC – Byron Pringle 6-yard run (Harrison Butker kick), 1:38. Chiefs 17–13. Drive: 13 plays, 97 yards, 7:52.

Fourth quarter

- SF – Jeff Wilson 4-yard run (Robbie Gould kick), 11:13. 49ers 20–17. Drive: 12 plays, 75 yards, 5:25.
- SF – Jeff Wilson 7-yard run (Robbie Gould kick), 3:41. 49ers 27–17. Drive: 11 plays, 71 yards, 6:12.

Top passers

- SF – Jimmy Garoppolo – 14/20, 188 yards, TD
- KC – Patrick Mahomes – 8/10, 126 yards, TD

Top rushers

- SF – Jeff Wilson – 12 rushes, 45 yards, TD
- KC – Darrel Williams – 5 rushes, 19 yards

Top receivers

- SF – Richie James – 4 receptions, 66 yards
- KC – Damien Williams – 3 receptions, 74 yards, TD

==== Week 4: at Green Bay Packers ====
Week 4: Kansas City Chiefs at Green Bay Packers – Game summary

Quarter	1	2	3	4	Total
Chiefs	3	7	10	0	20
Packers	0	20	0	7	27

at Lambeau Field, Green Bay, Wisconsin

- Date: August 29
- Game time: 7:00 p.m. CDT
- Game weather: Clear, 73 °F (23 °C)
- Game attendance: 73,803
- Referee: Alex Kemp
- Recap, Game Book

Game information

First quarter

- KC – Harrison Butker 28-yard field goal, 5:02. Chiefs 3–0. Drive: 17 plays, 80 yards, 7:40.

Second quarter

- GB – Ty Summers 74-yard interception return (kick failed, wide left), 12:22. Packers 6–3.
- GB – Jace Sternberger 2-yard pass from Tim Boyle (Mason Crosby kick), 10:10. Packers 13–3. Drive: 6 plays, 29 yards, 1:58.
- KC – Jody Fortson 2-yard pass from Kyle Shurmur (Harrison Butker kick), 3:43. Packers 13–10. Drive: 3 plays, 7 yards, 1:23.
- GB – Evan Baylis 1-yard pass from DeShone Kizer (Mason Crosby kick), 0:03. Packers 20–10. Drive: 12 plays, 81 yards, 3:40.

Third quarter

- KC – Nick Keizer 4-yard pass from Chase Litton (Harrison Butker kick), 2:22. Packers 20–17. Drive: 16 plays, 68 yards, 8:34.
- KC – Harrison Butker 43-yard field goal, 0:43. Tied 20–20. Drive: 4 plays, 1 yard, 1:30.

Fourth quarter

- GB – Dexter Williams 3-yard run (Mason Crosby kick), 6:24. Packers 27–20. Drive: 10 plays, 73 yards, 6:02.

Top passers

- KC – Kyle Shurmur – 14/20, 143 yards, TD, INT
- GB – DeShone Kizer – 8/15, 77 yards, TD, INT

Top rushers

- KC – Marcus Marshall – 14 rushes, 59 yards
- GB – Dexter Williams – 9 rushes, 34 yards, TD

Top receivers

- KC – Rashard Davis – 7 receptions, 47 yards
- GB – Teo Redding – 4 receptions, 49 yards

== Regular season ==
=== Schedule ===
Week	Date	Opponent	Result	Record	Venue	Recap
1	September 8	at Jacksonville Jaguars	**W** 40–26	1–0	TIAA Bank Field	Recap
2	September 15	at **Oakland Raiders**	**W** 28–10	2–0	RingCentral Coliseum	Recap
3	September 22	Baltimore Ravens	**W** 33–28	3–0	Arrowhead Stadium	Recap
4	September 29	at Detroit Lions	**W** 34–30	4–0	Ford Field	Recap
5	October 6	Indianapolis Colts	**L** 13–19	4–1	Arrowhead Stadium	Recap
6	October 13	Houston Texans	**L** 24–31	4–2	Arrowhead Stadium	Recap
7	October 17	at **Denver Broncos**	**W** 30–6	5–2	Empower Field at Mile High	Recap
8	October 27	Green Bay Packers	**L** 24–31	5–3	Arrowhead Stadium	Recap
9	November 3	Minnesota Vikings	**W** 26–23	6–3	Arrowhead Stadium	Recap
10	November 10	at Tennessee Titans	**L** 32–35	6–4	Nissan Stadium	Recap
11	November 18	at **Los Angeles Chargers**	**W** 24–17	7–4	Estadio Azteca (Mexico City)	Recap
12	Bye					
13	December 1	**Oakland Raiders**	**W** 40–9	8–4	Arrowhead Stadium	Recap
14	December 8	at New England Patriots	**W** 23–16	9–4	Gillette Stadium	Recap
15	December 15	**Denver Broncos**	**W** 23–3	10–4	Arrowhead Stadium	Recap
16	December 22	at Chicago Bears	**W** 26–3	11–4	Soldier Field	Recap
17	December 29	**Los Angeles Chargers**	**W** 31–21	12–4	Arrowhead Stadium	Recap

Note: Intra-division opponents are in bold text.

=== Game summaries ===
==== Week 1: at Jacksonville Jaguars ====
Week 1: Kansas City Chiefs at Jacksonville Jaguars – Game summary

Quarter	1	2	3	4	Total
**Chiefs**	17	6	7	10	**40**
Jaguars	7	6	0	13	**26**

at TIAA Bank Field, Jacksonville, Florida

- Date: September 8
- Game time: 1:00 p.m. EDT/12:00 p.m. CDT
- Game weather: Clear, 91 °F (33 °C)
- Game attendance: 60,157
- Referee: Carl Cheffers
- TV announcers (CBS): Ian Eagle, Dan Fouts and Evan Washburn
- Recap, Game Book

Game information

**First quarter**

- KC – Sammy Watkins 68-yard pass from Patrick Mahomes (Harrison Butker kick), 13:24. Chiefs 7–0. **Drive: 3 plays, 75 yards, 1:36.**
- KC – Harrison Butker 28-yard field goal, 8:57. Chiefs 10–0. **Drive: 6 plays, 70 yards, 2:47.**
- JAX – D. J. Chark 35-yard pass from Nick Foles (Josh Lambo kick), 5:23. Chiefs 10–7. **Drive: 7 plays, 75 yards, 3:34.**
- KC – Sammy Watkins 49-yard pass from Patrick Mahomes (Harrison Butker kick), 2:36. Chiefs 17–7. **Drive: 5 plays, 80 yards, 2:47.**

**Second quarter**

- JAX – Josh Lambo 37-yard field goal, 11:36. Chiefs 17–10. **Drive: 9 plays, 56 yards, 6:00.**
- KC – Harrison Butker 25-yard field goal, 7:56. Chiefs 20–10. **Drive: 7 plays, 68 yards, 3:40.**
- JAX – Josh Lambo 23-yard field goal, 4:22. Chiefs 20–13. **Drive: 5 plays, 70 yards, 3:34.**
- KC – Harrison Butker 46-yard field goal, 0:24. Chiefs 23–13. **Drive: 10 plays, 47 yards, 3:58.**

**Third quarter**

- KC – Damien Williams 1-yard run (Harrison Butker kick), 2:25. Chiefs 30–13. **Drive: 12 plays, 60 yards, 6:25.**

**Fourth quarter**

- KC – Sammy Watkins 3-yard pass from Patrick Mahomes (Harrison Butker kick), 10:56. Chiefs 37–13. **Drive: 8 plays, 67 yards, 4:19.**
- JAX – Dede Westbrook 15-yard pass from Gardner Minshew (pass failed), 7:32. Chiefs 37–19. **Drive: 7 plays, 79 yards, 3:24.**
- KC – Harrison Butker 35-yard field goal, 3:33. Chiefs 40–19. **Drive: 4 plays, −5 yards, 1:41.**
- JAX – Chris Conley 21-yard pass from Gardner Minshew (Josh Lambo kick), 1:55. Chiefs 40–26. **Drive: 6 plays, 75 yards, 1:38.**

**Top passers**

- KC – Patrick Mahomes – 25/33, 378 yards, 3 TD
- JAX – Gardner Minshew – 22/25, 275 yards, 2 TD, INT

**Top rushers**

- KC – LeSean McCoy – 10 rushes, 81 yards
- JAX – Leonard Fournette – 13 rushes, 66 yards

**Top receivers**

- KC – Sammy Watkins – 9 receptions, 198 yards, 3 TD
- JAX – D. J. Chark – 4 receptions, 146 yards, TD

==== Week 2: at Oakland Raiders ====
Week 2: Kansas City Chiefs at Oakland Raiders – Game summary

Quarter	1	2	3	4	Total
**Chiefs**	0	28	0	0	**28**
Raiders	10	0	0	0	**10**

at RingCentral Coliseum, Oakland, California

- Date: September 15
- Game time: 3:05 p.m. CDT/1:05 p.m. PDT
- Game weather: Sunny, 70 °F (21 °C)
- Game attendance: 52,748
- Referee: Clay Martin
- TV announcers (CBS): Jim Nantz, Tony Romo and Tracy Wolfson
- Recap, Game Book

Game information

**First quarter**

- OAK – Daniel Carlson 28-yard field goal, 10:21. Raiders 3–0 **Drive: 10 plays, 65 yards, 4:39.**
- OAK – Tyrell Williams 4-yard pass from Derek Carr (Daniel Carlson kick), 4:46. Raiders 10–0. **Drive: 6 plays, 74 yards, 2:38.**

**Second quarter**

- KC – Demarcus Robinson 44-yard pass from Patrick Mahomes (Harrison Butker kick), 14:55. Raiders 10–7. **Drive: 3 plays, 72 yards, 1:10.**
- KC – Mecole Hardman 42-yard pass from Patrick Mahomes (Harrison Butker kick), 5:51. Chiefs 14–10. **Drive: 14 plays, 95 yards, 6:32.**
- KC – Travis Kelce 27-yard pass from Patrick Mahomes (Harrison Butker kick), 1:41. Chiefs 21–10. **Drive: 5 plays, 94 yards, 1:52.**
- KC – Demarcus Robinson 39-yard pass from Patrick Mahomes (Harrison Butker kick), 0:40. Chiefs 28–10. **Drive: 1 play, 39 yards, 0:07.**

**Third quarter**

- No scoring plays.

**Fourth quarter**

- No scoring plays.

**Top passers**

- KC – Patrick Mahomes – 30/44, 443 yards, 4 TD
- OAK – Derek Carr – 23/38, 198 yards, TD, 2 INT

**Top rushers**

- KC – LeSean McCoy – 11 rushes, 23 yards
- OAK – Josh Jacobs – 12 rushes, 99 yards

**Top receivers**

- KC – Demarcus Robinson – 6 receptions, 172 yards, 2 TD
- OAK – Darren Waller – 6 receptions, 63 yards

==== Week 3: vs. Baltimore Ravens ====
Week 3: Baltimore Ravens at Kansas City Chiefs – Game summary

Quarter	1	2	3	4	Total
Ravens	6	0	7	15	**28**
**Chiefs**	0	23	7	3	**33**

at Arrowhead Stadium, Kansas City, Missouri

- Date: September 22
- Game time: 12:00 p.m. CDT
- Game weather: Cloudy, 72 °F (22 °C)
- Game attendance: 73,390
- Referee: John Hussey
- TV announcers (CBS): Ian Eagle, Dan Fouts and Evan Washburn
- Recap, Game Book

Game information

**First quarter**

- BAL – Mark Ingram II 2-yard run (run failed), 4:24. Ravens 6–0. **Drive: 14 plays, 84 yards, 6:30.**

**Second quarter**

- KC – LeSean McCoy 1-yard run (Harrison Butker kick), 14:18. Chiefs 7–6. **Drive: 11 plays, 75 yards, 5:06.**
- KC – Demarcus Robinson 18-yard pass from Patrick Mahomes (Harrison Butker kick), 7:52. Chiefs 14–6. **Drive: 5 plays, 47 yards, 2:43.**
- KC – Mecole Hardman 83-yard pass from Patrick Mahomes (kick failed, wide left), 3:00. Chiefs 20–6. **Drive: 3 plays, 96 yards, 1:27.**
- KC – Harrison Butker 42-yard field goal, 0:05. Chiefs 23–6. **Drive: 9 plays, 59 yards, 1:13.**

**Third quarter**

- BAL – Mark Ingram II 19-yard run (Justin Tucker kick), 10:35. Chiefs 23–13. **Drive: 9 plays, 75 yards, 4:25.**
- KC – LeSean McCoy 14-yard pass from Patrick Mahomes (Harrison Butker kick), 2:07. Chiefs 30–13. **Drive: 8 plays, 80 yards, 4:14.**

**Fourth quarter**

- BAL – Mark Ingram II 1-yard run (pass failed), 12:22. Chiefs 30–19. **Drive: 13 plays, 75 yards, 4:45.**
- BAL – Justin Tucker 39-yard field goal, 6:39. Chiefs 30–22. **Drive: 10 plays, 59 yards, 4:01.**
- KC – Harrison Butker 36-yard field goal, 4:36. Chiefs 33–22. **Drive: 8 plays, 57 yards, 2:03.**
- BAL – Lamar Jackson 9-yard run (pass failed), 2:01. Chiefs 33–28. **Drive: 9 plays, 70 yards, 2:35.**

**Top passers**

- BAL – Lamar Jackson – 22/43, 267 yards
- KC – Patrick Mahomes – 27/37, 374 yards, 3 TD

**Top rushers**

- BAL – Mark Ingram II – 16 rushes, 103 yards, 3 TD
- KC – Darrel Williams – 9 rushes, 62 yards

**Top receivers**

- BAL – Nick Boyle – 4 receptions, 58 yards
- KC – Mecole Hardman – 2 receptions, 97 yards, TD

==== Week 4: at Detroit Lions ====
Week 4: Kansas City Chiefs at Detroit Lions – Game summary

Quarter	1	2	3	4	Total
**Chiefs**	0	13	7	14	**34**
Lions	10	3	10	7	**30**

at Ford Field, Detroit, Michigan

- Date: September 29
- Game time: 1:00 p.m. EDT/12:00 p.m. CDT
- Game weather: None (indoor stadium)
- Game attendance: 65,188
- Referee: Walt Anderson
- TV announcers (Fox): Kevin Burkhardt, Charles Davis and Pam Oliver
- Recap, Game Book

Game information

**First quarter**

- DET – Matt Prater 25-yard field goal, 9:22. Lions 3–0. **Drive: 10 plays, 68 yards, 5:38.**
- DET – T. J. Hockenson 5-yard pass from Matthew Stafford (Matt Prater kick), 3:05. Lions 10–0. **Drive: 7 plays, 74 yards, 2:34.**

**Second quarter**

- KC – Harrison Butker 23-yard field goal, 14:12. Lions 10–3. **Drive: 10 plays, 81 yards, 3:53.**
- KC – LeSean McCoy 1-yard run (Harrison Butker kick), 4:13. Tied 10–10. **Drive: 7 plays, 70 yards, 3:57.**
- DET – Matt Prater 48-yard field goal, 1:03. Lions 13–10. **Drive: 8 plays, 50 yards, 3:10.**
- KC – Harrison Butker 44-yard field goal, 0:02. Tied 13–13. **Drive: 6 plays, 49 yards, 1:01.**

**Third quarter**

- KC – Bashaud Breeland 100-yard fumble return (Harrison Butker kick), 9:08. Chiefs 20–13.
- DET – Matt Prater 53-yard field goal, 6:19. Chiefs 20–16. **Drive: 7 plays, 40 yards, 2:49.**
- DET – Kenny Golladay 9-yard pass from Matthew Stafford (Matt Prater kick), 1:10. Lions 23–20. **Drive: 8 plays, 45 yards, 3:40.**

**Fourth quarter**

- KC – Darrel Williams 1-yard run (Harrison Butker kick), 12:09. Chiefs 27–23. **Drive: 9 plays, 75 yards, 4:01.**
- DET – Kenny Golladay 6-yard pass from Matthew Stafford (Matt Prater kick), 2:26. Lions 30–27. **Drive: 9 plays, 79 yards, 4:16.**
- KC – Darrel Williams 1-yard run (Harrison Butker kick), 0:20. Chiefs 34–30. **Drive: 13 plays, 79 yards, 2:06.**

**Top passers**

- KC – Patrick Mahomes – 24/42, 315 yards
- DET – Matthew Stafford – 21/34, 291 yards, 3 TD

**Top rushers**

- KC – LeSean McCoy – 11 rushes, 56 yards, TD
- DET – Kerryon Johnson – 26 rushes, 125 yards

**Top receivers**

- KC – Travis Kelce – 7 receptions, 85 yards
- DET – Marvin Jones – 3 receptions, 77 yards

==== Week 5: vs. Indianapolis Colts ====
Week 5: Indianapolis Colts at Kansas City Chiefs – Game summary

Quarter	1	2	3	4	Total
**Colts**	7	6	0	6	**19**
Chiefs	3	7	0	3	**13**

at Arrowhead Stadium, Kansas City, Missouri

- Date: October 6
- Game time: 7:20 p.m. CDT
- Game weather: Cloudy, 59 °F (15 °C)
- Game attendance: 73,352
- Referee: Craig Wrolstad
- TV announcers (NBC): Al Michaels, Cris Collinsworth and Michele Tafoya
- Recap, Game Book

Game information

**First quarter**

- KC – Harrison Butker 29-yard field goal, 9:02. Chiefs 3–0. **Drive: 12 plays, 64 yards, 5:58.**
- IND – Jacoby Brissett 1-yard run (Adam Vinatieri kick), 3:44. Colts 7–3. **Drive: 11 plays, 70 yards, 5:18.**

**Second quarter**

- KC – Byron Pringle 27-yard pass from Patrick Mahomes (Harrison Butker kick), 14:08. Chiefs 10–7. **Drive: 11 plays, 75 yards, 4:36.**
- IND – Adam Vinatieri 32-yard field goal, 11:12. Tied 10–10. **Drive: 7 plays, 61 yards, 2:56.**
- IND – Adam Vinatieri 31-yard field goal, 0:10. Colts 13–10. **Drive: 11 plays, 74 yards, 1:34.**

**Third quarter**

- No scoring plays.

**Fourth quarter**

- IND – Adam Vinatieri 31-yard field goal, 7:40. Colts 16–10. **Drive: 14 plays, 35 yards, 8:34.**
- IND – Adam Vinatieri 29-yard field goal, 2:27. Colts 19–10. **Drive: 7 plays, 21 yards, 2:35.**
- KC – Harrison Butker 36-yard field goal, 1:16. Colts 19–13. **Drive: 7 plays, 57 yards, 1:11.**

**Top passers**

- IND – Jacoby Brissett – 18/29, 151 yards, INT
- KC – Patrick Mahomes – 22/39, 321 yards, TD

**Top rushers**

- IND – Marlon Mack – 29 rushes, 132 yards
- KC – Damien Williams – 9 rushes, 23 yards

**Top receivers**

- IND – Nyheim Hines – 4 receptions, 46 yards
- KC – Byron Pringle – 6 receptions, 103 yards, TD

==== Week 6: vs. Houston Texans ====
Week 6: Houston Texans at Kansas City Chiefs – Game summary

Quarter	1	2	3	4	Total
**Texans**	3	20	0	8	**31**
Chiefs	17	0	7	0	**24**

at Arrowhead Stadium, Kansas City, Missouri

- Date: October 13
- Game time: 12:00 p.m. CDT
- Game weather: Sunny, 56 °F (13 °C)
- Game attendance: 73,323
- Referee: Shawn Hochuli
- TV announcers (CBS): Ian Eagle, Dan Fouts and Evan Washburn
- Recap, Game Book

Game information

**First quarter**

- KC – Tyreek Hill 46-yard pass from Patrick Mahomes (Harrison Butker kick), 11:42. Chiefs 7–0. **Drive: 6 plays, 91 yards, 3:18.**
- KC – Harrison Butker 41-yard field goal, 10:19. Chiefs 10–0. **Drive: 4 plays, −5 yards, 1:17.**
- HOU – Kaʻimi Fairbairn 44-yard field goal, 5:46. Chiefs 10–3. **Drive: 12 plays, 49 yards, 4:33.**
- KC – Damien Williams 14-yard pass from Patrick Mahomes (Harrison Butker kick), 1:28. Chiefs 17–3. **Drive: 9 plays, 90 yards, 4:18.**

**Second quarter**

- HOU – Duke Johnson 11-yard pass from Deshaun Watson (kick failed, wide right), 12:15. Chiefs 17–9. **Drive: 10 plays, 75 yards, 4:13.**
- HOU – Carlos Hyde 2-yard run (Kaʻimi Fairbairn kick), 3:06. Chiefs 17–16. **Drive: 12 plays, 80 yards, 5:36.**
- HOU – Deshaun Watson 3-yard run (Kaʻimi Fairbairn kick), 0:16. Texans 23–17. **Drive: 1 play, 3 yards, 0:07.**

**Third quarter**

- KC – Tyreek Hill 6-yard pass from Patrick Mahomes (Harrison Butker kick), 6:30. Chiefs 24–23. **Drive: 10 plays, 64 yards, 4:25.**

**Fourth quarter**

- HOU – Deshaun Watson 1-yard run (Deshaun Watson–DeAndre Hopkins pass), 6:17. Texans 31–24. **Drive: 12 plays, 93 yards, 8:32.**

**Top passers**

- HOU – Deshaun Watson – 30/42, 280 yards, TD, 2 INT
- KC – Patrick Mahomes – 19/35, 273 yards, 3 TD, INT

**Top rushers**

- HOU – Carlos Hyde – 26 rushes, 116 yards, TD
- KC – LeSean McCoy – 8 rushes, 44 yards

**Top receivers**

- HOU – Darren Fells – 6 receptions, 69 yards
- KC – Tyreek Hill – 5 receptions, 80 yards, 2 TD

==== Week 7: at Denver Broncos ====
Week 7: Kansas City Chiefs at Denver Broncos – Game summary

Quarter	1	2	3	4	Total
**Chiefs**	10	10	7	3	**30**
Broncos	6	0	0	0	**6**

at Empower Field at Mile High, Denver, Colorado

- Date: October 17
- Game time: 7:20 p.m. CDT/6:20 p.m. MDT
- Game weather: Mostly cloudy, 75 °F (24 °C)
- Game attendance: 76,748
- Referee: Shawn Smith
- TV announcers (Fox/NFLN/Amazon Prime): Joe Buck, Troy Aikman, Erin Andrews and Kristina Pink
- Recap, Game Book

Game information

**First quarter**

- DEN – Royce Freeman 1-yard run (run failed), 9:06. Broncos 6–0. **Drive: 10 plays, 75 yards, 5:54.**
- KC – Mecole Hardman 21-yard pass from Patrick Mahomes (Harrison Butker kick), 4:10. Chiefs 7–6. **Drive: 8 plays, 75 yards, 4:56.**
- KC – Harrison Butker 33-yard field goal, 1:00. Chiefs 10–6. **Drive: 4 plays, 6 yards, 1:31.**

**Second quarter**

- KC – Harrison Butker 20-yard field goal, 8:01. Chiefs 13–6. **Drive: 13 plays, 37 yards, 6:53.**
- KC – Reggie Ragland 5-yard fumble return (Harrison Butker kick), 7:10. Chiefs 20–6.

**Third quarter**

- KC – Tyreek Hill 57-yard pass from Matt Moore (Harrison Butker kick), 4:20. Chiefs 27–6. **Drive: 2 plays, 73 yards, 0:40.**

**Fourth quarter**

- KC – Harrison Butker 39-yard field goal, 5:04. Chiefs 30–6. **Drive: 5 plays, 30 yards, 3:06.**

**Top passers**

- KC – Matt Moore – 10/19, 117 yards, TD
- DEN – Joe Flacco – 21/34, 213 yards

**Top rushers**

- KC – LeSean McCoy – 12 rushes, 64 yards
- DEN – Phillip Lindsay – 11 rushes, 36 yards

**Top receivers**

- KC – Tyreek Hill – 3 receptions, 74 yards, TD
- DEN – Courtland Sutton – 6 receptions, 87 yards

==== Week 8: vs. Green Bay Packers ====
Week 8: Green Bay Packers at Kansas City Chiefs – Game summary

Quarter	1	2	3	4	Total
**Packers**	14	0	3	14	**31**
Chiefs	0	17	0	7	**24**

at Arrowhead Stadium, Kansas City, Missouri

- Date: October 27
- Game time: 7:20 p.m. CDT
- Game weather: Cloudy, 54 °F (12 °C)
- Game attendance: 73,558
- Referee: Bill Vinovich
- TV announcers (NBC): Al Michaels, Cris Collinsworth and Michele Tafoya
- Recap, Game Book

Game information

**First quarter**

- GB – Aaron Jones 4-yard pass from Aaron Rodgers (Mason Crosby kick), 8:43. Packers 7–0. **Drive: 10 plays, 74 yards, 6:17.**
- GB – Jamaal Williams 1-yard run (Mason Crosby kick), 2:09. Packers 14–0. **Drive: 4 plays, 60 yards, 2:02.**

**Second quarter**

- KC – Travis Kelce 29-yard pass from Matt Moore (Harrison Butker kick), 10:55. Packers 14–7. **Drive: 12 plays, 89 yards, 6:14.**
- KC – Mecole Hardman 30-yard pass from Matt Moore (Harrison Butker kick), 6:14. Tied 14–14. **Drive: 5 plays, 62 yards, 1:50.**
- KC – Harrison Butker 28-yard field goal, 0:56. Chiefs 17–14. **Drive: 11 plays, 74 yards, 3:03.**

**Third quarter**

- GB – Mason Crosby 35-yard field goal, 1:31. Tied 17–17. **Drive: 15 plays, 72 yards, 8:33.**

**Fourth quarter**

- GB – Jamaal Williams 3-yard pass from Aaron Rodgers (Mason Crosby kick), 13:57. Packers 24–17. **Drive: 5 plays, 27 yards, 2:22.**
- KC – Damien Williams 3-yard run (Harrison Butker kick), 9:01. Tied 24–24. **Drive: 10 plays, 75 yards, 4:56.**
- GB – Aaron Jones 67-yard pass from Aaron Rodgers (Mason Crosby kick), 8:02. Packers 31–24. **Drive: 2 plays, 75 yards, 0:59.**

**Top passers**

- GB – Aaron Rodgers – 23/33, 305 yards, 3 TD
- KC – Matt Moore – 24/36, 267 yards, 2 TD

**Top rushers**

- GB – Aaron Jones – 13 rushes, 67 yards
- KC – LeSean McCoy – 9 rushes, 40 yards

**Top receivers**

- GB – Aaron Jones – 7 receptions, 159 yards, 2 TD
- KC – Tyreek Hill – 6 receptions, 76 yards

==== Week 9: vs. Minnesota Vikings ====
Week 9: Minnesota Vikings at Kansas City Chiefs – Game summary

Quarter	1	2	3	4	Total
Vikings	7	3	6	7	**23**
**Chiefs**	7	3	10	6	**26**

at Arrowhead Stadium, Kansas City, Missouri

- Date: November 3
- Game time: 12:00 p.m. CST
- Game weather: Sunny, 54 °F (12 °C)
- Game attendance: 73,615
- Referee: Alex Kemp
- TV announcers (Fox): Kevin Burkhardt, Charles Davis and Pam Oliver
- Recap, Game Book

Game information

**First quarter**

- KC – Tyreek Hill 40-yard pass from Matt Moore (Harrison Butker kick), 8:21. Chiefs 7–0. **Drive: 7 plays, 67 yards.**
- MIN – Bisi Johnson 4-yard pass from Kirk Cousins (Dan Bailey kick), 2:50. Tied 7–7. **Drive: 12 plays, 75 yards, 5:31.**

**Second quarter**

- KC – Harrison Butker 24-yard field goal, 4:34. Chiefs 10–7. **Drive: 17 plays, 85 yards, 8:56.**
- MIN – Dan Bailey 29-yard field goal, 0:06. Tied 10–10. **Drive: 12 plays, 57 yards, 1:36.**

**Third quarter**

- MIN – Ameer Abdullah 16-yard pass from Kirk Cousins (kick failed, wide left), 11:51. Vikings 16–10. **Drive: 5 plays, 38 yards, 3:01.**
- KC – Damien Williams 91-yard run (Harrison Butker kick), 6:13. Chiefs 17–16. **Drive: 2 plays, 97 yards, 0:48.**
- KC – Harrison Butker 45-yard field goal, 0:30. Chiefs 20–16. **Drive: 7 plays, 39 yards, 2:58.**

**Fourth quarter**

- MIN – Kyle Rudolph 3-yard pass from Kirk Cousins (Dan Bailey kick), 10:59. Vikings 23–20. **Drive: 11 plays, 75 yards, 4:31.**
- KC – Harrison Butker 54-yard field goal, 2:30. Tied 23–23. **Drive: 8 plays, 38 yards, 4:05.**
- KC – Harrison Butker 44-yard field goal, 0:00. Chiefs 26–23. **Drive: 5 plays, 19 yards, 1:47.**

**Top passers**

- MIN – Kirk Cousins – 19/38, 220 yards, 3 TD
- KC – Matt Moore – 25/35, 275 yards, TD

**Top rushers**

- MIN – Dalvin Cook – 21 rushes, 71 yards
- KC – Damien Williams – 12 rushes, 125 yards, TD

**Top receivers**

- MIN – Laquon Treadwell – 3 receptions, 58 yards
- KC – Tyreek Hill – 6 receptions, 140 yards, TD

==== Week 10: at Tennessee Titans ====
Week 10: Kansas City Chiefs at Tennessee Titans – Game summary

Quarter	1	2	3	4	Total
Chiefs	10	3	9	10	**32**
**Titans**	0	13	7	15	**35**

at Nissan Stadium, Nashville, Tennessee

- Date: November 10
- Game time: 12:00 p.m. CST
- Game weather: Sunny, 63 °F (17 °C)
- Game attendance: 68,864
- Referee: Tony Corrente
- TV announcers (CBS): Jim Nantz, Tony Romo and Tracy Wolfson
- Recap, Game Book

Game information

**First quarter**

- KC – Travis Kelce 3-yard pass from Patrick Mahomes (Harrison Butker kick), 9:19. Chiefs 7–0. **Drive: 12 plays, 69 yards, 5:41.**
- KC – Harrison Butker 30-yard field goal, 4:43. Chiefs 10–0. **Drive: 4 plays, 8 yards, 3:05.**

**Second quarter**

- TEN – Anthony Firkser 9-yard pass from Ryan Tannehill (Ryan Succop kick), 10:23. Chiefs 10–7. **Drive: 4 plays, 73 yards, 1:34.**
- TEN – Rashaan Evans 53-yard fumble return (kick failed, wide left), 6:14. Titans 13–10.
- KC – Harrison Butker 41-yard field goal, 1:12. Tied 13–13. **Drive: 10 plays, 52 yards, 5:02.**

**Third quarter**

- KC – Tyreek Hill 11-yard pass from Patrick Mahomes (kick failed, wide left), 6:54. Chiefs 19–13. **Drive: 10 plays, 77 yards, 5:40.**
- TEN – Derrick Henry 68-yard run (Ryan Succop kick), 5:58. Titans 20–19. **Drive: 2 plays, 74 yards, 0:56.**
- KC – Harrison Butker 43-yard field goal, 1:58. Chiefs 22–20. **Drive: 10 plays, 50 yards, 4:00.**

**Fourth quarter**

- KC – Mecole Hardman 63-yard pass from Patrick Mahomes (Harrison Butker kick), 11:54. Chiefs 29–20. **Drive: 5 plays, 79 yards, 2:06.**
- TEN – Derrick Henry 1-yard run (Ryan Succop kick), 6:26. Chiefs 29–27. **Drive: 10 plays, 75 yards, 5:28.**
- KC – Harrison Butker 39-yard field goal, 3:14. Chiefs 32–27. **Drive: 7 plays, 53 yards, 3:12.**
- TEN – Adam Humphries 23-yard pass from Ryan Tannehill (Ryan Tannehill run), 0:23. Titans 35–32. **Drive: 4 plays, 61 yards, 0:58.**

**Top passers**

- KC – Patrick Mahomes – 36/50, 446 yards, 3 TD
- TEN – Ryan Tannehill – 13/19, 181 yards, 2 TD

**Top rushers**

- KC – Damien Williams – 19 rushes, 77 yards
- TEN – Derrick Henry – 23 rushes, 188 yards, 2 TD

**Top receivers**

- KC – Tyreek Hill – 11 receptions, 157 yards, TD
- TEN – Jonnu Smith – 4 receptions, 30 yards

==== Week 11: at Los Angeles Chargers ====
NFL Mexico City games

Week 11: Kansas City Chiefs at Los Angeles Chargers – Game summary

Quarter	1	2	3	4	Total
**Chiefs**	0	10	14	0	**24**
Chargers	3	6	8	0	**17**

at Estadio Azteca, Mexico City, Mexico

- Date: November 18
- Game time: 7:15 p.m. CST
- Game weather: Cloudy, 67 °F (19 °C)
- Game attendance: 76,252
- Referee: Brad Allen
- TV announcers (ESPN): Joe Tessitore, Booger McFarland and Lisa Salters
- Recap, Game Book

Game information

**First quarter**

- LAC – Michael Badgley 27-yard field goal, 9:31. Chargers 3–0. **Drive: 9 plays, 68 yards, 5:29.**

**Second quarter**

- KC – LeSean McCoy 6-yard run (Harrison Butker kick), 8:45. Chiefs 7–3. **Drive: 1 play, 6 yards, 0:05.**
- LAC – Michael Badgley 26-yard field goal, 5:01. Chiefs 7–6. **Drive: 9 plays, 67 yards, 3:44.**
- KC – Harrison Butker 41-yard field goal, 1:43. Chiefs 10–6. **Drive: 9 plays, 52 yards, 3:18.**
- LAC – Michael Badgley 49-yard field goal, 0:00. Chiefs 10–9. **Drive: 9 plays, 44 yards, 1:43.**

**Third quarter**

- KC – Darrel Williams 6-yard run (Harrison Butker kick), 9:29. Chiefs 17–9. **Drive: 9 plays, 75 yards, 5:31.**
- KC – Travis Kelce 23-yard pass from Patrick Mahomes (Harrison Butker kick), 4:56. Chiefs 24–9. **Drive: 6 plays, 54 yards, 3:20.**
- LAC – Keenan Allen 7-yard pass from Philip Rivers (Philip Rivers–Hunter Henry pass), 1:44. Chiefs 24–17. **Drive: 6 plays, 75 yards, 3:12.**

**Fourth quarter**

- No scoring plays.

**Top passers**

- KC – Patrick Mahomes – 19/32, 182 yards, TD, INT
- LAC – Philip Rivers – 28/52, 353 yards, TD, 4 INT

**Top rushers**

- KC – Patrick Mahomes – 5 rushes, 59 yards
- LAC – Melvin Gordon – 14 rushes, 69 yards

**Top receivers**

- KC – Travis Kelce – 7 receptions, 92 yards, TD
- LAC – Austin Ekeler – 8 receptions, 108 yards

==== Week 13: vs. Oakland Raiders ====
Week 13: Oakland Raiders at Kansas City Chiefs – Game summary

Quarter	1	2	3	4	Total
Raiders	0	0	0	9	**9**
**Chiefs**	7	14	10	9	**40**

at Arrowhead Stadium, Kansas City, Missouri

- Date: December 1
- Game time: 3:25 p.m. CST
- Game weather: Cloudy, 36 °F (2 °C)
- Game attendance: 73,548
- Referee: John Hussey
- TV announcers (CBS): Jim Nantz, Tony Romo and Tracy Wolfson
- Recap, Game Book

Game information

**First quarter**

- KC – Darrel Williams 3-yard pass from Patrick Mahomes (Harrison Butker kick), 7:26. Chiefs 7–0. **Drive: 11 plays, 47 yards, 3:31.**

**Second quarter**

- KC – Patrick Mahomes 13-yard run (Harrison Butker kick), 6:28. Chiefs 14–0. **Drive: 8 plays, 60 yards, 3:25.**
- KC – Juan Thornhill 46-yard interception return (Harrison Butker kick), 3:42. Chiefs 21–0.

**Third quarter**

- KC – Harrison Butker 50-yard field goal, 12:03. Chiefs 24–0. **Drive: 9 plays, 34 yards, 2:57.**
- KC – LeSean McCoy 3-yard run (Harrison Butker kick), 6:51. Chiefs 31–0. **Drive: 4 plays, 64 yards, 2:15.**

**Fourth quarter**

- OAK – Daniel Carlson 34-yard field goal, 14:56. Chiefs 31–3. **Drive: 13 plays, 60 yards, 6:55.**
- KC – Darwin Thompson 4-yard run (Harrison Butker kick), 5:24. Chiefs 38–3. **Drive: 14 plays, 75 yards, 9:32.**
- OAK – Derek Carrier 4-yard pass from Derek Carr, 0:39. Chiefs 38–9. **Drive: 10 plays, 75 yards, 4:45.**
- KC – Charvarius Ward defensive two-point conversion, 0:39. Chiefs 40–9.

**Top passers**

- OAK – Derek Carr – 20/30, 222 yards, TD, 2 INT
- KC – Patrick Mahomes – 15/29, 175 yards, TD

**Top rushers**

- OAK – Josh Jacobs – 17 rushes, 104 yards
- KC – Darwin Thompson – 11 rushes, 44 yards, TD

**Top receivers**

- OAK – Darren Waller – 7 receptions, 100 yards
- KC – Travis Kelce – 5 receptions, 90 yards

==== Week 14: at New England Patriots ====
Week 14: Kansas City Chiefs at New England Patriots – Game summary

Quarter	1	2	3	4	Total
**Chiefs**	3	17	3	0	**23**
Patriots	7	0	6	3	**16**

at Gillette Stadium, Foxborough, Massachusetts

- Date: December 8
- Game time: 4:25 p.m. EST/3:25 p.m. CST
- Game weather: Cloudy, 32 °F (0 °C)
- Game attendance: 65,878
- Referee: Jerome Boger
- TV announcers (CBS): Jim Nantz, Tony Romo and Tracy Wolfson
- Recap, Game Book

Game information

**First quarter**

- NE – Julian Edelman 37-yard pass from Tom Brady (Nick Folk kick), 12:34. Patriots 7–0. **Drive: 5 plays, 83 yards, 2:26.**
- KC – Harrison Butker 48-yard field goal, 7:12. Patriots 7–3. **Drive: 9 plays, 53 yards, 3:46.**

**Second quarter**

- KC – Mecole Hardman 48-yard pass from Patrick Mahomes (Harrison Butker kick), 13:04. Chiefs 10–7. **Drive: 7 plays, 58 yards, 3:56.**
- KC – Travis Kelce 4-yard run (Harrison Butker kick), 9:33. Chiefs 17–7. **Drive: 7 plays, 35 yards, 3:20.**
- KC – Harrison Butker 31-yard field goal, 0:59. Chiefs 20–7. **Drive: 10 plays, 74 yards, 1:49.**

**Third quarter**

- KC – Harrison Butker 31-yard field goal, 8:46. Chiefs 23–7. **Drive: 11 plays, 52 yards, 6:14.**
- NE – Brandon Bolden 10-yard run (run failed), 4:23. Chiefs 23–13. **Drive: 2 plays, 19 yards, 0:51.**

**Fourth quarter**

- NE – Nick Folk 29-yard field goal, 11:42. Chiefs 23–16. **Drive: 9 plays, 46 yards, 3:25.**

**Top passers**

- KC – Patrick Mahomes – 26/40, 283 yards, TD, INT
- NE – Tom Brady – 19/36, 169 yards, TD, INT

**Top rushers**

- KC – LeSean McCoy – 11 rushes, 39 yards
- NE – James White – 6 rushes, 33 yards

**Top receivers**

- KC – Travis Kelce – 7 receptions, 66 yards
- NE – Julian Edelman – 8 receptions, 95 yards

==== Week 15: vs. Denver Broncos ====
Week 15: Denver Broncos at Kansas City Chiefs – Game summary

Quarter	1	2	3	4	Total
Broncos	0	3	0	0	**3**
**Chiefs**	6	9	8	0	**23**

at Arrowhead Stadium, Kansas City, Missouri

- Date: December 15
- Game time: 12:00 p.m. CST
- Game weather: Snow, 24 °F (−4 °C)
- Game attendance: 73,257
- Referee: Clete Blakeman
- TV announcers (CBS): Ian Eagle, Dan Fouts and Evan Washburn
- Recap, Game Book

Game information

**First quarter**

- KC – Tyreek Hill 41-yard pass from Patrick Mahomes (pass failed), 9:42. Chiefs 6–0. **Drive: 4 plays, 79 yards, 2:00.**

**Second quarter**

- KC – Harrison Butker 23-yard field goal, 12:57. Chiefs 9–0. **Drive: 12 plays, 79 yards, 6:48.**
- KC – Harrison Butker 24-yard field goal, 6:24. Chiefs 12–0. **Drive: 10 plays, 69 yards, 5:24.**
- DEN – Brandon McManus 32-yard field goal, 1:56. Chiefs 12–3. **Drive: 11 plays, 61 yards, 4:28.**
- KC – Harrison Butker 44-yard field goal, 0:00. Chiefs 15–3. **Drive: 9 plays, 53 yards, 1:56.**

**Third quarter**

- KC – Tyreek Hill 5-yard pass from Patrick Mahomes (Patrick Mahomes–Sammy Watkins pass), 9:45. Chiefs 23–3. **Drive: 10 plays, 75 yards, 5:15.**

**Fourth quarter**

- No scoring plays

**Top passers**

- DEN – Drew Lock – 18/40, 208 yards, INT
- KC – Patrick Mahomes – 27/34, 340 yards, 2 TD, INT

**Top rushers**

- DEN – Phillip Lindsay – 7 rushes, 32 yards
- KC – Darwin Thompson – 8 rushes, 38 yards

**Top receivers**

- DEN – Courtland Sutton – 4 receptions, 79 yards
- KC – Travis Kelce – 11 receptions, 142 yards

==== Week 16: at Chicago Bears ====
Week 16: Kansas City Chiefs at Chicago Bears – Game summary

Quarter	1	2	3	4	Total
**Chiefs**	7	10	0	9	**26**
Bears	0	0	3	0	**3**

at Soldier Field, Chicago, Illinois

- Date: December 22
- Game time: 7:20 p.m. CST
- Game weather: Clear, 45 °F (7 °C)
- Game attendance: 62,213
- Referee: Carl Cheffers
- TV announcers (NBC): Al Michaels, Cris Collinsworth and Michele Tafoya
- Recap, Game Book

Game information

**First quarter**

- KC – Patrick Mahomes 12-yard run (Harrison Butker kick), 1:30. Chiefs 7–0. **Drive: 15 plays, 82 yards, 7:58.**

**Second quarter**

- KC – Harrison Butker 56-yard field goal, 11:41. Chiefs 10–0. **Drive: 7 plays, 31 yards, 3:06.**
- KC – Travis Kelce 6-yard pass from Patrick Mahomes (Harrison Butker kick), 0:52. Chiefs 17–0. **Drive: 13 plays, 95 yards, 6:42.**

**Third quarter**

- CHI – Eddy Piñeiro 46-yard field goal, 0:00. Chiefs 17–3. **Drive: 6 plays, 23 yards, 2:50.**

**Fourth quarter**

- KC – Damien Williams 14-yard pass from Patrick Mahomes (kick failed, hit left upright), 10:05. Chiefs 23–3. **Drive: 9 plays, 71 yards, 4:55.**
- KC – Harrison Butker 32-yard field goal, 1:40. Chiefs 26–3. **Drive: 11 plays, 43 yards, 6:02.**

**Top passers**

- KC – Patrick Mahomes – 23/33, 251 yards, 2 TD
- CHI – Mitchell Trubisky – 18/34, 157 yards

**Top rushers**

- KC – Damien Williams – 16 rushes, 65 yards
- CHI – David Montgomery – 13 rushes, 57 yards

**Top receivers**

- KC – Travis Kelce – 8 receptions, 74 yards, TD
- CHI – Allen Robinson – 6 receptions, 53 yards

==== Week 17: vs. Los Angeles Chargers ====
Week 17: Los Angeles Chargers at Kansas City Chiefs – Game summary

Quarter	1	2	3	4	Total
Chargers	0	7	7	7	**21**
**Chiefs**	3	7	14	7	**31**

at Arrowhead Stadium, Kansas City, Missouri

- Date: December 29
- Game time: 12:00 p.m. CST
- Game weather: Cloudy, 40 °F (4 °C)
- Game attendance: 73,680
- Referee: Walt Anderson
- TV announcers (CBS): Kevin Harlan, Rich Gannon and John Schriffen
- Recap, Game Book

Game information

**First quarter**

- KC – Harrison Butker 40-yard field goal, 1:29. Chiefs 3–0. **Drive: 15 plays, 62 yards, 8:12.**

**Second quarter**

- LAC – Keenan Allen 12-yard pass from Philip Rivers (Michael Badgley kick), 11:44. Chargers 7–3. **Drive: 11 plays, 74 yards, 4:45.**
- KC – Demarcus Robinson 24-yard pass from Patrick Mahomes (Harrison Butker kick), 2:16. Chiefs 10–7. **Drive: 4 plays, 57 yards, 1:29.**

**Third quarter**

- LAC – Melvin Gordon 5-yard run (Michael Badgley kick), 13:14. Chargers 14–10. **Drive: 3 plays, 21 yards, 1:26.**
- KC – Mecole Hardman 104-yard kickoff return (Harrison Butker kick), 12:58. Chiefs 17–14.
- KC – Damien Williams 84-yard run (Harrison Butker kick), 6:26. Chiefs 24–14. **Drive: 1 play, 84 yards, 0:15.**

**Fourth quarter**

- LAC – Hunter Henry 8-yard pass from Philip Rivers (Michael Badgley kick), 5:23. Chiefs 24–21. **Drive: 14 plays, 86 yards, 7:11.**
- KC – Damien Williams 7-yard run (Harrison Butker kick), 2:37. Chiefs 31–21. **Drive: 8 plays, 77 yards, 2:46.**

**Top passers**

- LAC – Philip Rivers – 31/46, 281 yards, 2 TD, 2 INT
- KC – Patrick Mahomes – 16/25, 174 yards, TD, INT

**Top rushers**

- LAC – Melvin Gordon – 14 rushes, 46 yards, TD
- KC – Damien Williams – 12 rushes, 124 yards, 2 TD

**Top receivers**

- LAC – Keenan Allen – 9 receptions, 82 yards, TD
- KC – Tyreek Hill – 4 receptions, 61 yards

The win over the Chargers, combined with a New England loss to Miami, allowed the Chiefs to secure the No. 2 seed, and a first-round bye in the playoffs. It also gave them home-field advantage for the Divisional round.

=== Standings ===
==== Division ====
AFC West
	W	L	T	PCT	DIV	CONF	PF	PA	STK
^{(2)} Kansas City Chiefs	12	4	0	.750	6–0	9–3	451	308	W6
Denver Broncos	7	9	0	.438	3–3	6–6	282	316	W2
Oakland Raiders	7	9	0	.438	3–3	5–7	313	419	L1
Los Angeles Chargers	5	11	0	.313	0–6	3–9	337	345	L3

==== Conference ====
AFC
#	Team	Division	W	L	T	PCT	DIV	CONF	SOS	SOV	STK
**Division leaders**
1	Baltimore Ravens	North	14	2	0	.875	5–1	10–2	.494	.484	W12
2 (Note: Kansas City claimed the No. 2 seed over New England based on head-to-head victory.)	Kansas City Chiefs	West	12	4	0	.750	6–0	9–3	.510	.477	W6
3	New England Patriots	East	12	4	0	.750	5–1	8–4	.469	.411	L1
4	Houston Texans	South	10	6	0	.625	4–2	8–4	.520	.488	L1
**Wild Cards**
5	Buffalo Bills	East	10	6	0	.625	3–3	7–5	.461	.363	L2
6	Tennessee Titans	South	9	7	0	.563	3–3	7–5	.488	.465	W1
**Did not qualify for the postseason**
7	Pittsburgh Steelers	North	8	8	0	.500	3–3	6–6	.502	.324	L3
8 (Note: Denver finished ahead of Indianapolis and NY Jets based on conference record. Division tiebreak was initially used to eliminate Oakland (see below).) (Note: Denver finished ahead of Oakland based on conference record.)	Denver Broncos	West	7	9	0	.438	3–3	6–6	.510	.406	W2
9 (Note: Oakland and Indianapolis finished ahead of NY Jets based on conference record.) (Note: Oakland finished ahead of Indianapolis based on head-to-head victory.)	Oakland Raiders	West	7	9	0	.438	3–3	5–7	.482	.335	L1
10	Indianapolis Colts	South	7	9	0	.438	3–3	5–7	.492	.500	L1
11	New York Jets	East	7	9	0	.438	2–4	4–8	.473	.402	W2
12 (Note: Jacksonville finished ahead of Cleveland based on record against common opponents. Jacksonville's cumulative record against Cincinnati, Denver, NY Jets, and Tennessee was 4–1, compared to Cleveland's 2–3 cumulative record against the same four teams.)	Jacksonville Jaguars	South	6	10	0	.375	2–4	6–6	.484	.406	W1
13	Cleveland Browns	North	6	10	0	.375	3–3	6–6	.533	.479	L3
14 (Note: LA Chargers finished ahead of Miami based on head-to-head victory.)	Los Angeles Chargers	West	5	11	0	.313	0–6	3–9	.514	.488	L3
15	Miami Dolphins	East	5	11	0	.313	2–4	4–8	.484	.463	W2
16	Cincinnati Bengals	North	2	14	0	.125	1–5	2–10	.553	.406	W1
**Tiebreakers** (Note: When breaking ties for three or more teams under the NFL's rules, they are first broken within divisions, then comparing only the highest ranked remaining team from each division.)

== Postseason ==
=== Schedule ===
Round	Date	Opponent (seed)	Result	Record	Venue	Recap
Wild Card	First-round bye					
Divisional	January 12	Houston Texans (4)	W 51–31	1–0	Arrowhead Stadium	Recap
AFC Championship	January 19	Tennessee Titans (6)	W 35–24	2–0	Arrowhead Stadium	Recap
Super Bowl LIV	February 2	vs. San Francisco 49ers (N1)	W 31–20	3–0	Hard Rock Stadium	Recap

=== Game summaries ===
==== AFC Divisional Playoffs: vs. (4) Houston Texans ====
AFC Divisional Playoffs: (4) Houston Texans at (2) Kansas City Chiefs – Game summary

Quarter	1	2	3	4	Total
Texans	21	3	7	0	31
Chiefs	0	28	13	10	51

at Arrowhead Stadium, Kansas City, Missouri

- Date: January 12, 2020
- Game time: 2:05 p.m. CST
- Game weather: Cloudy, 29 °F (−2 °C)
- Game attendance: 73,503
- Referee: Shawn Hochuli
- TV announcers (CBS): Jim Nantz, Tony Romo, Tracy Wolfson and Jay Feely
- Recap, Game Book

Game information

First quarter

- HOU – Kenny Stills 54-yard pass from Deshaun Watson (Kaʻimi Fairbairn kick), 11:59. Texans 7–0. Drive: 6 plays, 75 yards, 3:01.
- HOU – Lonnie Johnson Jr. 10-yard return of blocked punt (Kaʻimi Fairbairn kick), 10:06. Texans 14–0.
- HOU – Darren Fells 4-yard pass from Deshaun Watson (Kaʻimi Fairbairn kick), 1:21. Texans 21–0. Drive: 2 plays, 6 yards, 0:48.

Second quarter

- HOU – Kaʻimi Fairbairn 31-yard field goal, 10:54. Texans 24–0. Drive: 9 plays, 38 yards, 4:55.
- KC – Damien Williams 17-yard pass from Patrick Mahomes (Harrison Butker kick), 9:55. Texans 24–7. Drive: 2 plays, 42 yards, 0:59.
- KC – Travis Kelce 5-yard pass from Patrick Mahomes (Harrison Butker kick), 8:05. Texans 24–14. Drive: 3 plays, 33 yards, 0:23.
- KC – Travis Kelce 6-yard pass from Patrick Mahomes (Harrison Butker kick), 6:31. Texans 24–21. Drive: 3 plays, 6 yards, 1:25.
- KC – Travis Kelce 5-yard pass from Patrick Mahomes (Harrison Butker kick), 0:44. Chiefs 28–24. Drive: 8 plays, 90 yards, 2:03.

Third quarter

- KC – Damien Williams 1-yard run (kick failed, wide left), 11:24. Chiefs 34–24. Drive: 7 plays, 85 yards, 3:36.
- KC – Damien Williams 5-yard run (Harrison Butker kick), 4:39. Chiefs 41–24. Drive: 6 plays, 77 yards, 3:55.
- HOU – Deshaun Watson 5-yard run (Kaʻimi Fairbairn kick), 0:24. Chiefs 41–31. Drive: 9 plays, 75 yards, 4:15.

Fourth quarter

- KC – Blake Bell 8-yard pass from Patrick Mahomes (Harrison Butker kick), 13:52. Chiefs 48–31. Drive: 4 plays, 72 yards, 1:32.
- KC – Harrison Butker 24-yard field goal, 8:06. Chiefs 51–31. Drive: 7 plays, 52 yards, 3:31.

Top passers

- HOU – Deshaun Watson – 31/52, 388 yards, 2 TD
- KC – Patrick Mahomes – 23/35, 321 yards, 5 TD

Top rushers

- HOU – Carlos Hyde – 13 rushes, 44 yards
- KC – Patrick Mahomes – 7 rushes, 53 yards

Top receivers

- HOU – DeAndre Hopkins – 9 receptions, 118 yards
- KC – Travis Kelce – 10 receptions, 134 yards, 3 TD

After falling behind 24–0, Kansas City came back with an NFL playoff record seven consecutive touchdowns and a field goal over their next eight drives, including a run of 28 points in the final 10 minutes of the second quarter.

On the opening possession, Houston mounted a six-play, 75-yard drive that culminated in Deshaun Watson's 54-yard touchdown pass to Kenny Stills on third-and-1, giving the Texans an early 7–0 lead. The Chiefs then went three-and-out on their first drive, with tight end Travis Kelce dropping a potential first down pass on third down. Dustin Colquitt's ensuing punt was blocked by Barkevious Mingo and recovered by Lonnie Johnson Jr., who returned it 10 yards for a touchdown that put the Texans up 14–0 less than five minutes into the game.

After both teams punted on their next drives, Chiefs returner Tyreek Hill muffed the ball inside his own 10-yard line which was recovered by Keion Crossen for Houston. Two plays later, Watson found tight end Darren Fells in the end zone for a 4-yard touchdown and a 21–0 lead late in the first quarter.

The next time Houston got the ball, they drove 48 yards in nine plays to a fourth-and-inches on the Chiefs 13-yard line. The Texans lined up to go for it. However, after having to call a timeout with the play clock running down, Texans coach Bill O'Brien changed his mind because he did not like their play call. So, rather than risk a potential turnover on downs, the Texans settled for Kaʻimi Fairbairn's 31-yard field goal to go up by 24 at the 10:54 mark of the second quarter. This would be the extent of their success, as the Chiefs went from being down 0-24 as late as 10:05 remaining in the 2nd quarter, to trailing 14–24 at the 8:05 mark, then 21–24 at 6:31, and finally taking the lead 28–24 at 0:44 remaining in the first half. The scoring would go on to be 51–7 in favor of the Chiefs from that 10:54 point in the 2nd quarter. First, Mecole Hardman returned the ensuing kickoff 58 yards to Houston's 42-yard line. Patrick Mahomes then threw a 25-yard pass to Kelce to get in the red zone before hitting running back Damien Williams for a 17-yard touchdown. After Houston went three-and-out on their next drive, they attempted a fake punt on fourth-and-4 with a direct snap to Justin Reid who was tackled by Daniel Sorensen two yards short, giving Kansas City the ball at the Texans 33. Johnson was then called for pass interference to put the ball at the five before Mahomes hit Kelce in the end zone to cut the deficit to 10. On the ensuing kickoff, DeAndre Carter fumbled the ball due to a hit by Sorenson, and it went right into the arms of Kansas City's Darwin Thompson, who returned it to the Houston 6-yard line. Mahomes then threw his third touchdown pass in less than four minutes, and his second to Kelce, to make the score 24–21.

Taking possession at their own 10 with 2:47 left in the quarter, the Chiefs went on a 90-yard drive that included another pass interference on Johnson, while Mahomes rushed twice for 35 yards and completed a pair of 20-yard passes to Hill and Kelce. Finally, with 44 seconds left in the half, Mahomes threw another five-yard touchdown to Kelce to give the Chiefs their first lead of the game, 28–24. Mahomes’ four touchdown passes in the second quarter tied an NFL postseason record set by Doug Williams in Super Bowl XXII. Fairbairn missed a 51-yard field goal as time expired in the half as the Chiefs became the first team in NFL history to fall behind by as many as 20 points in the first half but still lead at halftime.

The Chiefs would extend their lead on the opening possession of the third quarter, going 85 yards in 7 plays, the longest a 48-yard catch by Sammy Watkins. Williams ran the ball in from the goal-line, increasing their lead to 34-24 after Harrison Butker missed the extra point. After forcing another Texans punt, the Chiefs took advantage of another pass interference penalty against Houston and a 28-yard completion from Mahomes to Kelce, scoring on their sixth straight possession with another Williams touchdown run to give them a 41–24 lead with 4:39 left in the quarter. Houston finally snapped Kansas City's 41-point run when Watson completed 4 passes for 80 yards and finished the drive with a 5-yard touchdown run, making the score 41–31 with 24 seconds left in the third quarter.

Kansas City would make it seven touchdowns in a row, setting a new postseason record, on a drive that included a 23-yard pass to Kelce and a 28-yard completion to Watkins, putting the ball at the Houston 8. Mahomes then found Blake Bell in the end zone, making the score 48–31. On Houston's next drive, they turned the ball over on downs at the Chiefs 42. A pair runs by Williams for gains of 11 and 26 yard to set up Butker's 24-yard field goal with 8:06 left to put Kansas City up by 20. Houston then turned the ball over on downs on their final two possessions, the last coming when Frank Clark sacked Watson for a 17-yard loss on 4th-and-8 from the Kansas City 8-yard line.

Mahomes finished the game 23/35 for 321 yards and five touchdowns with no interceptions. He was also the leading rusher with 53 yards on seven carries. Kelce had 10 catches for 134 yards and three touchdowns, tying a Super Bowl-era postseason record. Hardman had six kickoff returns for 142 yards. Williams rushed for 47 yards, caught two passes for 21 yards, and scored three touchdowns. Watson threw for 388 yards and two touchdowns, while DeAndre Hopkins had 118 yards on nine catches. Kansas City's 24-point comeback was the fourth largest in postseason history.

During the game, the Chiefs scored so many touchdowns that Arrowhead Stadium quickly ran out of touchdown fireworks.

==== AFC Championship: vs. (6) Tennessee Titans ====
AFC Championship: (6) Tennessee Titans at (2) Kansas City Chiefs – Game summary

Quarter	1	2	3	4	Total
Titans	10	7	0	7	24
Chiefs	7	14	0	14	35

at Arrowhead Stadium, Kansas City, Missouri

- Date: January 19, 2020
- Game time: 2:05 p.m. CST
- Game weather: Sunny, 17 °F (−8 °C)
- Game attendance: 73,656
- Referee: Tony Corrente
- TV announcers (CBS): Jim Nantz, Tony Romo, Tracy Wolfson and Jay Feely
- Recap, Game Book

Game information

First quarter

- TEN – Greg Joseph 30-yard field goal, 11:29. Titans 3–0. Drive: 8 plays, 58 yards, 3:31.
- TEN – Derrick Henry 4-yard run (Greg Joseph kick), 5:52. Titans 10–0. Drive: 9 plays, 58 yards, 4:07.
- KC – Tyreek Hill 8-yard pass from Patrick Mahomes (Harrison Butker kick), 0:46. Titans 10–7. Drive: 10 plays, 74 yards, 5:06.

Second quarter

- TEN – Dennis Kelly 1-yard pass from Ryan Tannehill (Greg Joseph kick), 6:39. Titans 17–7. Drive: 15 plays, 75 yards, 9:07.
- KC – Tyreek Hill 20-yard pass from Patrick Mahomes (Harrison Butker kick), 4:03. Titans 17–14. Drive: 5 plays, 63 yards, 2:36.
- KC – Patrick Mahomes 27-yard run (Harrison Butker kick), 0:11. Chiefs 21–17. Drive: 9 plays, 86 yards, 1:40.

Third quarter

- No scoring plays.

Fourth quarter

- KC – Damien Williams 3-yard run (Harrison Butker kick), 14:50. Chiefs 28–17. Drive: 13 plays, 73 yards, 7:08.
- KC – Sammy Watkins 60-yard pass from Patrick Mahomes (Harrison Butker kick), 7:33. Chiefs 35–17. Drive: 7 plays, 88 yards, 4:21.
- TEN – Anthony Firkser 22-yard pass from Ryan Tannehill (Greg Joseph kick), 4:18. Chiefs 35–24. Drive: 8 plays, 80 yards, 3:15.

Top passers

- TEN – Ryan Tannehill – 21/31, 209 yards, 2 TD
- KC – Patrick Mahomes – 23/35, 294 yards, 3 TD

Top rushers

- TEN – Derrick Henry – 19 rushes, 69 yards, TD
- KC – Patrick Mahomes – 8 rushes, 53 yards, TD

Top receivers

- TEN – Corey Davis – 5 receptions, 65 yards
- KC – Sammy Watkins – 7 receptions, 114 yards, TD

==== Super Bowl LIV: vs. (N1) San Francisco 49ers ====
Super Bowl LIV: (N1) San Francisco 49ers vs. (A2) Kansas City Chiefs – Game summary

Quarter	1	2	3	4	Total
49ers	3	7	10	0	20
Chiefs	7	3	0	21	31

at Hard Rock Stadium, Miami, Florida

- Date: February 2, 2020
- Game time: 6:30 p.m. EST/5:30 p.m. CST
- Game weather: 64 °F (18 °C)
- Game attendance: 62,417
- Referee: Bill Vinovich
- TV announcers (Fox): Joe Buck, Troy Aikman, Erin Andrews and Chris Myers
- Recap, Game Book

Game information

First quarter

- SF – Robbie Gould 38-yard field goal, 7:57. 49ers 3–0. Drive: 10 plays, 62 yards, 5:58.
- KC – Patrick Mahomes 1-yard run (Harrison Butker kick), 0:31. Chiefs 7–3. Drive: 15 plays, 75 yards, 7:26.

Second quarter

- KC – Harrison Butker 31-yard field goal, 9:32. Chiefs 10–3. Drive: 9 plays, 43 yards, 4:36.
- SF – Kyle Juszczyk 15-yard pass from Jimmy Garoppolo (Robbie Gould kick), 5:05. Tied 10–10. Drive: 7 plays, 80 yards, 4:27.

Third quarter

- SF – Robbie Gould 42-yard field goal, 9:29. 49ers 13–10. Drive: 9 plays, 60 yards, 5:31.'
- SF – Raheem Mostert 1-yard run (Robbie Gould kick), 2:35. 49ers 20–10. Drive: 5 plays, 55 yards, 2:48.

Fourth quarter

- KC – Travis Kelce 1-yard pass from Patrick Mahomes (Harrison Butker kick), 6:13. 49ers 20–17. Drive: 10 plays, 83 yards, 2:40.
- KC – Damien Williams 5-yard pass from Patrick Mahomes (Harrison Butker kick), 2:44. Chiefs 24–20. Drive: 5 plays, 55 yards, 2:48.
- KC – Damien Williams 38-yard run (Harrison Butker kick), 1:12. Chiefs 31–20. Drive: 2 plays, 42 yards, 0:13.

Top passers

- SF – Jimmy Garoppolo – 20/31, 219 yards, TD, 2 INT
- KC – Patrick Mahomes – 26/42, 286 yards, 2 TD, 2 INT

Top rushers

- SF – Raheem Mostert – 12 rushes, 58 yards, TD
- KC – Damien Williams – 17 rushes, 104 yards, TD

Top receivers

- SF – Deebo Samuel – 5 receptions, 39 yards
- KC – Tyreek Hill – 9 receptions, 105 yards

With the win, the Chiefs won their first Super Bowl since Super Bowl IV in 1970.
