= Ravens–Titans rivalry =

National Football League rivalry

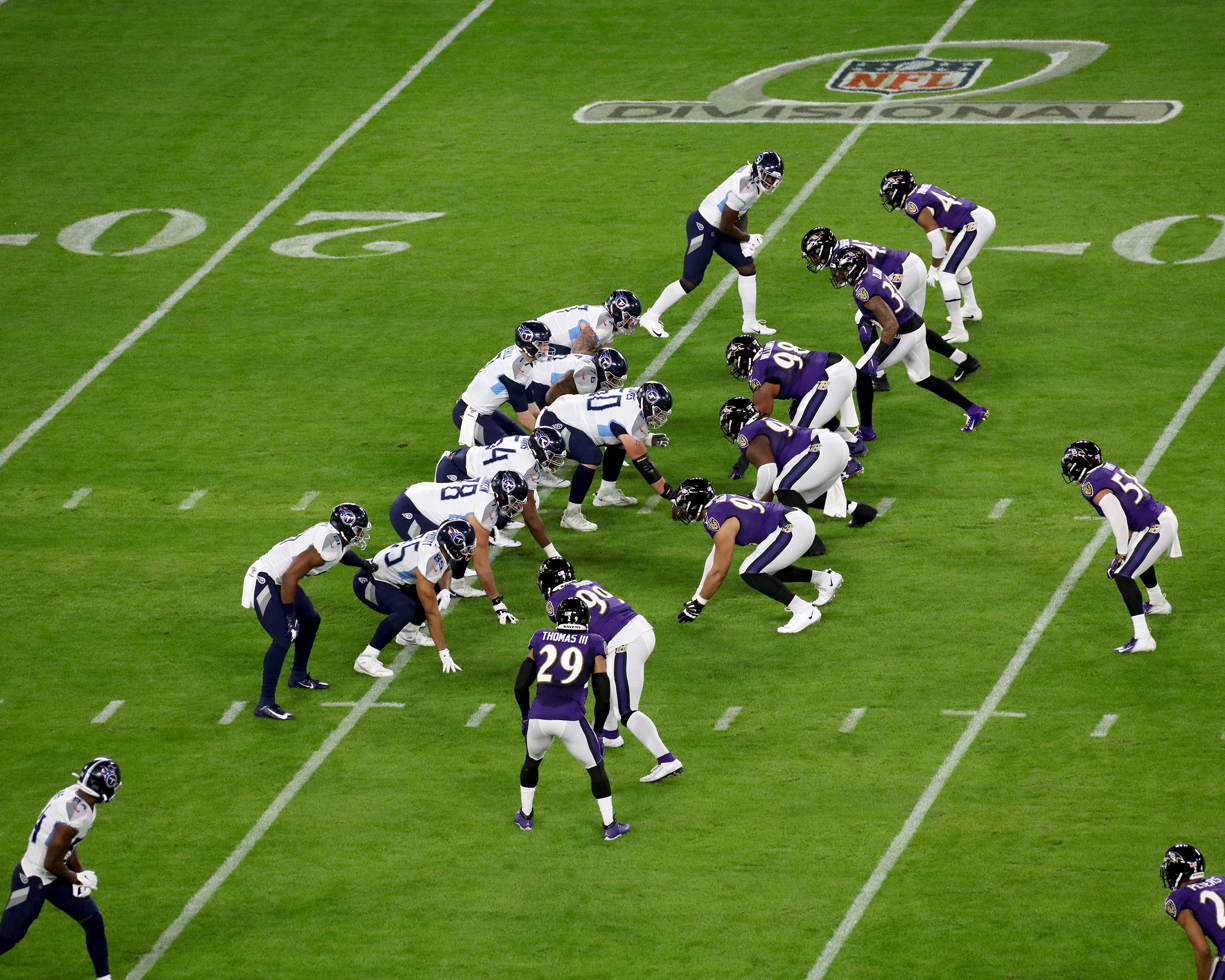
- Titans and Ravens facing off in the 2019 divisional playoff

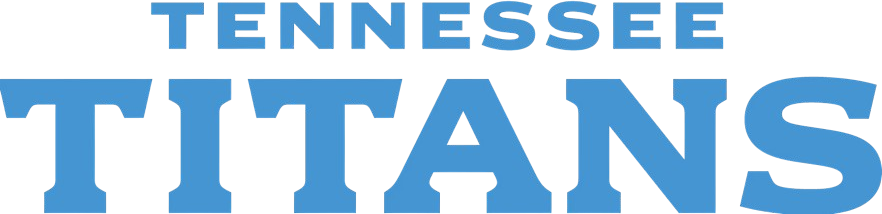
- Baltimore Ravens Tennessee Titans
- Location: Baltimore, Nashville
- First meeting: September 15, 1996; Astrodome; Oilers 29, Ravens 13
- Latest meeting: October 4, 2026; Ravens 24, Titans 18
- Next meeting: TBD
- Stadiums: Ravens: M&T Bank Stadium; Titans: Nissan Stadium

Statistics
- Total meetings: 28
- All-time series: Ravens: 15–13
- Regular season series: Ravens: 12–11
- Postseason results: Ravens: 3–2
- Largest victory: Ravens: 41–14 (1999); Titans: 29–13 (1996), 28–12 (2019)
- Most points scored: Ravens: 41 (1999); Titans: 30 (2020)
- Longest win streak: Ravens: 5 (2000–2002); Titans: 3 (1998–1999)
- Current win streak: Ravens: 3 (2021–present)

Post–season history
- 2000 AFC Divisional: Ravens won: 24–10; 2003 AFC Wild Card: Titans won: 20–17; 2008 AFC Divisional: Ravens won: 13–10; 2019 AFC Divisional: Titans won: 28–12; 2020 AFC Wild Card: Ravens won: 20–13

The Ravens–Titans rivalry is a professional American football rivalry between the Baltimore Ravens and the Tennessee Titans in the National Football League’s American Football Conference. Originally divisional rivals in the AFC Central, the Ravens and Titans eventually moved into the AFC North and AFC South, respectively. The teams have met in the playoffs five times (the visiting team has won all five games) and are both known for their strong defensive play. The rivalry is one of the tightest in the NFL with the Ravens leading 15–13; (the Ravens presently lead in overall points scored 506–451), and the road team has won sixteen of the first twenty-seven meetings through 2023. In 2020, CBS ranked it as the No. 7 NFL rivalry of the 2000s.

Furthermore, both teams do not play every year as they play in different divisions; instead, they play once every three years and once every six seasons at each team's home stadium due to the NFL's rotating division schedules during which their respective divisions are paired up, if they meet in the playoffs, or if the two teams finish in the same place in their respective divisions, they would play each other the following season.

== History ==
The rivalry between the Baltimore Ravens and the then-Houston Oilers began in 1996 when the Ravens were founded as a result of the Cleveland Browns' relocation to Baltimore and subsequent deactivation. The Ravens assumed Cleveland's place in the AFC Central, in which the Oilers were also a member. As divisional rivals, the Ravens played the Oilers/Titans twice a year from 1996 through 2001, which encompassed the Oilers' 1997 move to Tennessee and 1999 name change from "Oilers" to "Titans." The teams met 13 times during these years, including once in the playoffs: a 24–10 Ravens win in the 2000 Divisional Round.

When the Houston Texans were established in 2002, the now 32-team league realigned into four-team divisions. The Ravens were placed in the AFC North while the Titans were placed in the AFC South. As a result, the two teams would only meet sporadically from this point on. However, despite moving into separate divisions, the strong enmity that the two teams had for each other during the 2000s. The Ravens and Titans would meet in the regular season at least once every three years when the AFC North plays the AFC South in the schedule rotation. During other seasons, the Ravens and Titans would only play each other if both teams finished in the same spot in their respective divisions the prior season (for example, both teams finished second place in their divisions in 2017, so they played each other in 2018).

Throughout the history of the rivalry, the teams have met in the playoffs five times, with the Ravens leading 3–2. The away team has won every playoff meeting. The Titans were twice upset by the Ravens as the AFC's top seed (in 2000 and 2008), while the Titans upset the top-seeded Ravens in 2019.

=== Notable moments ===
- The two teams had their first meeting at the Astrodome on September 15, 1996, during the Ravens' first season and the Oilers' final year in Houston. For three years between 1999 and 2001, the Ravens and the now-Titans escalated their rivalry to new heights, with numerous dirty hits and punches exchanged between players.
- The two teams met in the playoffs for the first time on January 7, 2001. Ravens linebacker Ray Lewis intercepted a pass bobbled by Titans running back Eddie George for a fourth-quarter touchdown, sealing a 24–10 Baltimore win that helped the Ravens advance to win their first Super Bowl in franchise history.
- On January 4, 2004, during the 2003 Wild Card Round, the Titans got revenge for their last postseason loss. While Titans quarterback Steve McNair and Ravens quarterback Anthony Wright combined for two touchdowns (49 yards to Justin McCareins and 35 yards to Todd Heap) and five interceptions, McNair led Tennessee down the field following Wright’s score to Heap, setting up their game-winning field goal. This 20–17 win also snapped a five-game losing streak to the Ravens.
- In 2005, the Ravens signed Derrick Mason and Samari Rolle after they were cut by the Titans.
- In 2006, the Titans traded Steve McNair to the Ravens after locking him out of their facility during a contract dispute.
- On January 10, 2009, in the 2008 Divisional Round, the 6th-seeded Ravens defeated the top-seeded Titans with a 13–10 victory after the Titans committed three costly turnovers, two by quarterback Kerry Collins. The Ravens won behind rookie quarterback Joe Flacco and former Titans Samari Rolle and Derrick Mason.
- On January 11, 2020, in the 2019 Divisional Round, the 6th-seeded Titans avenged their prior playoff losses to the Ravens as the AFC's #1 seed, upsetting the top-seeded Ravens 28–12 in the divisional round behind strong performances from running back Derrick Henry, quarterback Ryan Tannehill, and the defense, which largely shut down NFL MVP Lamar Jackson.
- On November 22, 2020, Derrick Henry scored a 29-yard rushing touchdown in overtime to give the Titans a 30–24 win. Before the game, a confrontation ensued after Titans cornerback Malcolm Butler and his teammates taunted the Ravens by yelling at their sideline from midfield.
- On January 10, 2021, the Ravens beat the Titans in Nissan Stadium in the AFC Wild Card 20–13, ending a 2-game losing streak to the Titans, and continuing the trend of the road playoff team winning in this rivalry. After a game-sealing interception by cornerback Marcus Peters, the Ravens danced on the Titans logo at midfield, in retaliation for the Titans dancing on their logo earlier in the season.

== Season–by–season results ==
Baltimore Ravens vs. Houston/ Tennessee Oilers/ Titans Season-by-Season Results
1990s (Oilers/Titans, 5–3)

Season	Season series	at Baltimore Ravens	at Houston/Tennessee Oilers/Titans	Overall series	Notes
1996	Oilers 2–0	Oilers; 24–21	Oilers; 29–13	Oilers; 2–0	Ravens' inaugural season. The rivalry begins as both teams are members of the AFC Central. The only season in the rivalry, the Titans franchise was still in Houston.
1997	Ravens 2–0	Ravens; 21–19	Ravens; 36–10	Tie; 2–2	Oilers' first season in Tennessee.
1998	Oilers 2–0	Oilers; 12–8	Oilers; 16–14	Oilers; 4–2	Meeting in Baltimore was the first meeting at M&T Bank Stadium. (Note: M&T Bank Stadium was known as “Ravens Stadium at Camden Yards from 1998 to 1999, then it was renamed PSINet Stadium from 1999 to 2002, and Ravens Stadium from 2002 to 2003.) It is also the last season that the Titans franchise was named the Oilers.
1999	Tie 1–1	Ravens; 41–14	Titans; 14–11	Titans; 5–3	Meeting in Tennessee was the first meeting at Nissan Stadium and as the "Tennessee Titans". (Note: Nissan Stadium was originally named Adelphia Coliseum from 1999 to 2002, The Coliseum from 2002 to 2006, and LP Field from 2006 to 2015.) Titans lose Super Bowl XXXIV.

2000s (Ravens, 7–4)

Season	Results	Location	Overall series	Notes
2000	Titans; 14–6	PSINet Stadium	Titans; 6–4	
2000	Ravens; 24–23	Adelphia Coliseum	Titans; 6–4	Ravens' win snapped the Titans 13-game home winning streak.
2000 Playoffs	Ravens; 24–10	Adelphia Coliseum	Titans; 6–5	AFC Divisional Round. Both of the Titans' home losses on the season were at the hands of the Ravens. Only postseason meeting as AFC Central rivals. The Ravens broke a 10–10 tie in the fourth quarter on a 90-yard blocked field goal return and a 50-yard interception return. Ravens win Super Bowl XXXV.
2001	Ravens; 26–7	PSINet Stadium	Ravens; 7–6	
2001	Ravens; 16–10	Adelphia Coliseum	Ravens; 7–6	Last meeting as AFC Central rivals. Ravens take their first lead in the series of the rivalry.
2002	Ravens; 13–12	Ravens Stadium	Ravens; 8–6	The Ravens stay in the newly named AFC North, while the Titans are moved into the newly created AFC South.
2003 Playoffs	Titans; 20–17	M&T Bank Stadium	Ravens; 8–7	AFC Wild Card Round. Gary Anderson kicks the game-winning field goal with 29 seconds remaining as the Titans advance.
2005	Titans; 25–10	The Coliseum	Tie; 8–8	
2006	Ravens; 27–26	LP Field	Ravens; 9–8	Steve McNair’s only game against his former team. Ravens overcame a 26–7 deficit and block a potential game-winning 43-yard field goal by Titans kicker Rob Bironas.
2008	Titans; 13–10	M&T Bank Stadium	Tie; 9–9	
2008 Playoffs	Ravens; 13–10	LP Field	Ravens; 10–9	AFC Divisional Round. Matt Stover kicks the game-winning field goal with 57 seconds remaining as the Ravens advance. Ravens' QB Joe Flacco becomes the first rookie quarterback to win two playoff games. The Titans get upset as the #1 seed in the divisional round for the second time at the hands of the Ravens.

2010s (Titans, 3–2)

Season	Results	Location	Overall series	Notes
2011	Titans; 26–13	LP Field	Tie; 10–10	
2014	Ravens; 21–7	M&T Bank Stadium	Ravens; 11–10	
2017	Titans; 23–20	Nissan Stadium	Tie; 11–11	
2018	Ravens; 21–0	Nissan Stadium	Ravens; 12–11	
2019 Playoffs	Titans; 28–12	M&T Bank Stadium	Tie; 12–12	AFC Divisional Round. Titans avenge previous playoff losses to the Ravens as the #1 seed by dominating the 14–2 Ravens and halting their 12-game winning streak. First time in NFL history that the away team wins the first four meetings in any postseason matchup between two franchises. Also marks the third time that the #1 seed has been eliminated in the divisional round in the rivalry (2000, 2008, 2019), and the first time following that criterion that the Titans beat the Ravens. Titans' win snapped the Ravens 12-game winning streak.

2020s (Ravens, 3–1)

Season	Results	Location	Overall series	Notes
2020	Titans; 30–24 (OT)	M&T Bank Stadium	Titans; 13–12	Referees had to break up a pregame argument between Ravens head coach John Harbaugh and Titans CB Malcolm Butler. Titans rally from a 21–10 deficit midway through the third quarter. First overtime meeting in the rivalry.
2020 Playoffs	Ravens; 20–13	Nissan Stadium	Tie; 13–13	AFC Wild Card Round. Ravens overcome early 10–0 deficit to avenge their playoff loss to the Titans the previous season. The away team has won all five postseason meetings to date.
2023	Ravens; 24–16	Tottenham Hotspur Stadium	Ravens; 14–13	Game played as part of the NFL International Series, officially a Titans home game
2026	Ravens; 24–18	M&T Bank Stadium	Ravens; 15–13	

Summary of Results

Season	Season series	at Baltimore Ravens	at Houston/Tennessee Oilers/Titans	Notes
Regular Season	Tie 11–11	Tie 5–5	Tie 6–6	
Postseason games	Ravens 3–2	Titans 2–0	Ravens 3–0	AFC Wild Card: 2003, 2020; AFC Divisional: 2000, 2008, 2019
Regular and postseason	Ravens 14–13	Titans 7–5	Ravens 9–6	

== Connections between the teams ==
- Derrick Mason
- Samari Rolle
- Steve McNair
- Derrick Henry

== See also ==
- Texans–Titans rivalry
- Ravens–Steelers rivalry
- Steelers–Titans rivalry
