= 2020–21 NFL playoffs =

American football tournament

- Dates: January 9 – February 7, 2021
- Season: 2020
- Teams: 14
- Games played: 13
- Super Bowl LV site: Raymond James Stadium; Tampa, Florida
- Defending champions: Kansas City Chiefs
- Champion: Tampa Bay Buccaneers (2nd title)
- Runner-up: Kansas City Chiefs
- Conference runners-up: Buffalo Bills; Green Bay Packers
NFL playoffs
← 2019–20	2021–22 →

The National Football League playoffs for the 2020 season began with the Wildcard Round on January 9, 2021, and concluded with Super Bowl LV at Raymond James Stadium in Tampa, Florida, on February 7, when the Tampa Bay Buccaneers beat the Kansas City Chiefs 31–9. This marked the first time a team has played the Super Bowl at their home field, as the Buccaneers reached the title game after winning three playoff games on the road.

The league expanded its playoff system from a 12-team to a 14-team tournament, adding a third wild card team for each conference for the first time since the 2001 season, and only awarding each conference's division winner with the best record a first round bye. The Wild Card round was thus extended from two to three games per day.

The playoffs were played during the COVID-19 pandemic in the United States, and each game's attendance was limited due to local health restrictions. Had a serious outbreak occurred during the regular season, the league had contingency plans to delay the postseason, eliminate the bye week before the Super Bowl and postpone the game itself to as late as February 28. NFL owners also approved an additional alternative plan to implement a 16-team playoff format, with no teams getting a bye, if "meaningful" regular season games were canceled because of the virus.

The Cleveland Browns and eventual Super Bowl champions Tampa Bay Buccaneers, who had not made it to the playoffs since 2002 and 2007, respectively, and thus held the two longest playoff appearance droughts in the league at the time, both qualified for the postseason in 2020, giving the New York Jets, who had not appeared since 2010, the longest active playoff appearance drought. Conversely, the New England Patriots missed the postseason for the first time since 2008, ending the longest playoff appearance streak in NFL history.

With the Buffalo Bills and Baltimore Ravens facing each other in the AFC Divisional playoffs, Buffalo became the third team in NFL history (joining the Los Angeles Rams and Philadelphia Eagles) and the first AFC team to face every team within their respective conference in the postseason at least once.

== Participants ==
Within each conference, the four division winners and the top three non-division winners with the best overall regular season records qualified for the playoffs. The four division winners are seeded 1–4 based on their overall won-lost-tied record, and the wild card teams are seeded 5–7. The NFL does not use a fixed bracket playoff system, and there are no restrictions regarding teams from the same division matching up in any round. In the first round, dubbed the Wild Card playoffs, the second-seeded division winner hosts the seventh seed wild card, the third seed hosts the sixth seed, and the fourth seed hosts the fifth seed. The 1 seed from each conference receives a first-round bye. In the second round, the Divisional playoffs, the number 1 seed hosts the lowest-seeded surviving team from the first round (seed 4, 5, 6, or 7), while the other two surviving teams play each other, with the higher-seeded team hosting. The two surviving teams from each conference's divisional playoff games then meet in the respective AFC and NFC Conference Championships, hosted by the higher seed. Although the Super Bowl, the championship round of the playoffs, is played at a neutral site, the designated home team is based on an annual rotation by conference.

Playoff seeds
Seed	AFC	NFC
1	Kansas City Chiefs (West winner)	Green Bay Packers (North winner)
2	Buffalo Bills (East winner)	New Orleans Saints (South winner)
3	Pittsburgh Steelers (North winner)	Seattle Seahawks (West winner)
4	Tennessee Titans (South winner)	Washington Football Team (East winner)
5	Baltimore Ravens (wild card)	Tampa Bay Buccaneers (wild card)
6	Cleveland Browns (wild card)	Los Angeles Rams (wild card)
7	Indianapolis Colts (wild card)	Chicago Bears (wild card)

== Bracket ==
Jan 10 – Nissan Stadium	Jan 16 – Bills Stadium
5	Baltimore	20
4	Tennessee	13
5	Baltimore	3
Jan 24 – Arrowhead Stadium
Jan 9 – Bills Stadium	2	Buffalo	17
AFC
7	Indianapolis	24	2	Buffalo	24
Jan 17 – Arrowhead Stadium
2	Buffalo	27	1	Kansas City	38
AFC Championship
Jan 10 – Heinz Field	6	Cleveland	17
1	Kansas City	22
6	Cleveland	48
Divisional playoffs	Feb 7 – Raymond James Stadium
3	Pittsburgh	37
Wild-card round
A1	Kansas City	9
Jan 9 – FedExField	Jan 17 – Mercedes-Benz Superdome	N5	Tampa Bay	31
Super Bowl LV
5	Tampa Bay	31
4	Washington	23
5	Tampa Bay	30
Jan 24 – Lambeau Field
Jan 10 – Mercedes-Benz Superdome	2	New Orleans	20
NFC
7	Chicago	9	5	Tampa Bay	31
Jan 16 – Lambeau Field
2	New Orleans	21	1	Green Bay	26
NFC Championship
Jan 9 – Lumen Field	6	LA Rams	18
1	Green Bay	32
6	LA Rams	30
3	Seattle	20

== Schedule ==
In the event of a COVID-19 outbreak, the league stated playoff games or entire postseason rounds could be postponed, the bye week after the Conference Championships could be eliminated, and the Super Bowl could be moved up to three weeks later to February 28. None of these contingency plans were necessary.

Round	Away team	Score	Home team	Date	Kickoff (ET / UTC–5)	TV	Viewers (millions)	TV rating
Wild-card round	Indianapolis Colts	24–27	Buffalo Bills	January 9, 2021	1:05 p.m.	CBS	20.1	11.6
Wild-card round	Los Angeles Rams	30–20	Seattle Seahawks	January 9, 2021	4:40 p.m.	Fox	24.6	12.7
Wild-card round	Tampa Bay Buccaneers	31–23	Washington Football Team	January 9, 2021	8:15 p.m.	NBC	21.4	11.5
Wild-card round	Baltimore Ravens	20–13	Tennessee Titans	January 10, 2021	1:05 p.m.	ABC/ESPN	24.8	14.2
Wild-card round	Chicago Bears	9–21	New Orleans Saints	January 10, 2021	4:40 p.m.	CBS/Nickelodeon	30.6	16.4
Wild-card round	Cleveland Browns	48–37	Pittsburgh Steelers	January 10, 2021	8:15 p.m.	NBC	26.0	13.4
Divisional round	Los Angeles Rams	18–32	Green Bay Packers	January 16, 2021	4:35 p.m.	Fox	26.5	14.1
Divisional round	Baltimore Ravens	3–17	Buffalo Bills	January 16, 2021	8:15 p.m.	NBC	26.3	13.7
Divisional round	Cleveland Browns	17–22	Kansas City Chiefs	January 17, 2021	3:05 p.m.	CBS	34.3	18.3
Divisional round	Tampa Bay Buccaneers	30–20	New Orleans Saints	January 17, 2021	6:40 p.m.	Fox	35.5	18.1
Conference championships	Tampa Bay Buccaneers	31–26	Green Bay Packers	January 24, 2021	3:05 p.m.	Fox	44.8	23.0
Conference championships	Buffalo Bills	24–38	Kansas City Chiefs	January 24, 2021	6:40 p.m.	CBS	41.8	21.1
Super Bowl LV Raymond James Stadium Tampa, Florida	Kansas City Chiefs	9–31	Tampa Bay Buccaneers	February 7, 2021	6:40 p.m.	CBS	96.4	38.2

== Wild-card round ==
=== Saturday, January 9, 2021 ===
==== AFC: Buffalo Bills 27, Indianapolis Colts 24 ====
Indianapolis Colts vs. Buffalo Bills – Game summary

Quarter	1	2	3	4	Total
Colts	3	7	0	14	24
Bills	7	7	3	10	27

at Bills Stadium, Orchard Park, New York

- Date: January 9, 2021
- Game time: 1:05 p.m. EST
- Game weather: Sunny with some clouds, 34 °F (1 °C)
- Game attendance: 6,772 (Note: Attendance at the game was limited to 6,772 due to the COVID-19 pandemic in New York.)
- Referee: Brad Allen
- TV announcers (CBS): Ian Eagle, Charles Davis and Evan Washburn
- Recap, Game Book

Game information

First quarter

- IND – Rodrigo Blankenship 30-yard field goal, 5:29. Colts 3–0. Drive: 8 plays, 52 yards, 3:39.
- BUF – Dawson Knox 3-yard pass from Josh Allen (Tyler Bass kick), 1:49. Bills 7–3. Drive: 8 plays, 85 yards, 3:40.

Second quarter

- IND – Jonathan Taylor 1-yard run (Rodrigo Blankenship kick), 8:07. Colts 10–7. Drive: 9 plays, 65 yards, 5:27.
- BUF – Josh Allen 5-yard run (Tyler Bass kick), 0:14. Bills 14–10. Drive: 10 plays, 96 yards, 1:32.

Third quarter

- BUF – Tyler Bass 46-yard field goal, 11:05. Bills 17–10. Drive: 9 plays, 44 yards, 3:55.

Fourth quarter

- BUF – Stefon Diggs 35-yard pass from Josh Allen (Tyler Bass kick), 14:10. Bills 24–10. Drive: 9 plays, 77 yards, 4:22.
- IND – Zach Pascal 9-yard pass from Philip Rivers (run failed), 11:32. Bills 24–16. Drive: 7 plays, 75 yards, 2:38.
- BUF – Tyler Bass 54-yard field goal, 8:08. Bills 27–16. Drive: 7 plays, 39 yards, 3:24.
- IND – Jack Doyle 27-yard pass from Philip Rivers (Philip Rivers–Jack Doyle pass), 6:13. Bills 27–24. Drive: 5 plays, 76 yards, 1:55.

Top passers

- IND – Philip Rivers – 27/46, 309 yards, 2 TD
- BUF – Josh Allen – 26/35, 324 yards, 2 TD

Top rushers

- IND – Jonathan Taylor – 21 rushes, 78 yards, TD
- BUF – Josh Allen – 11 rushes, 54 yards, TD

Top receivers

- IND – Michael Pittman Jr. – 5 receptions, 90 yards
- BUF – Stefon Diggs – 6 receptions, 128 yards, TD

Buffalo built up a 24–10 second half lead and held off an Indianapolis fourth quarter rally to earn their first playoff win since the 1995 season.

In the first quarter, Colts quarterback Philip Rivers made completions to T. Y. Hilton and Michael Pittman Jr. for gains of 23 and 22 yards that set up the first score on a 30-yard field goal by Rodrigo Blankenship. Buffalo responded with an 8-play, 85-yard drive, featuring a 36-yard completion from Josh Allen to Stefon Diggs. Allen finished the drive with a 3-yard touchdown pass to tight end Dawson Knox, giving the Bills a 7–3 lead with less than 2 minutes left in the quarter.

On a second quarter drive, Rivers completed a 32-yard pass to Pittman, while running back Jonathan Taylor caught a 6-yard pass and rushed four times for 17 yards, the last carry a 1-yard touchdown run to put the Colts up 10–7. Then after a punt, Indianapolis drove to a first and goal from the Bills 4-yard line; after a 2-yard pass and a 1-yard run, Taylor was tackled for a 3-yard loss by Tre'Davious White and Taron Johnson. Deciding to attempt a fourth-down conversion, Indianapolis turned the ball over as Rivers' pass to Pittman Jr. was incomplete. Taking the ball back with 1:46 left in the half, Allen completed passes to Gabe Davis for gains of 37 and 19 yards, while also picking up 16 yards on a scramble as he led the team 96 yards in 10 plays to score on a 5-yard touchdown run with 20 seconds left before halftime, giving Buffalo a 14–10 lead.

Buffalo took the second half kickoff and drove 44 yards in 9 plays, with Allen completing two passes to Cole Beasley for 23 yards and a 16-yard pass to Diggs. Tyler Bass finished the possession with a 46-yard field goal, that increased the team's lead to 17–10. Indianapolis responded with a drive to the Bills' 15-yard line, only to have Blankenship miss a 33-yard field goal attempt. Buffalo then drove 77 yards in 9 plays to go up 24–10 on Allen's 35-yard touchdown completion to Diggs, with 14:17 left.

On the second play of the Colts' next possession, Nyheim Hines took off for a 29-yard run, and then Taylor rushed for 20 yards. The Colts were on the move and did not stop until Rivers finished the drive with a 9-yard touchdown pass to wide receiver Zach Pascal, making the score 24–16. After a Bills penalty moved the ball to the 1-yard line on the extra point attempt, the Colts decided to try a 2-point conversion. Linebacker Matt Milano broke up the play by getting through the line and dropping Taylor for a 1-yard loss. Buffalo then responded with a pair of 16-yard receptions by Diggs and Beasley that set up Bass' 54-yard field goal, increasing the Bills' lead to 27–16 with just over 8 minutes left. Faced with 3rd and 7 on their ensuing drive, the Colts fooled Buffalo's defense with a draw play, in which Hines took a delayed handoff and ran 33 yards to the Bills' 27-yard line. On the next play, Rivers completed a 27-yard touchdown pass to tight end Jack Doyle; Rivers threw the ball to Doyle again on a 2-point conversion, making the score 27–24.

Buffalo took the ball back and drove to the Colts' 34-yard line, but Colts defensive end Denico Autry sacked Allen and forced a fumble. Bills offensive tackle Daryl Williams recovered the ball, but the team lost 18 yards and ended up having to punt with 2:38 left, giving the Colts a chance to drive for a winning or tying score. The Colts proceeded to drive to the Buffalo 46-yard line, converting two fourth downs along the way. On the second one, Pascal made a diving catch for 17 yards on fourth and 10, then appeared to fumble the ball as he got up, which Buffalo recovered. However, officials ruled him down by contact after making the catch, and this was upheld by replay review. Still, Buffalo's defense managed to hang on after this, forcing a 1-yard loss and two incompletions to set up a 4th down at the 47 yard line. Rivers flung a desperation pass to the end zone as time expired, but the pass was batted away safely to the ground for an incompletion to end the game.

Allen finished the game 26-for-35 for 324 yards and two touchdowns, while also leading the Bills in rushing with 11 carries for 54 yards and a touchdown. Diggs caught 6 passes for 128 yards and a touchdown. Rivers was 27-for-46 for 309 yards and two touchdowns in what would end up being his final NFL game prior to announcing his retirement. Taylor was the top rusher for the game with 21 carries for 76 yards and a touchdown, while Hines had 75 yards on 6 rushes and Pittman caught 5 passes for 90 yards. Colts linebacker Shaquille Leonard had 9 solo tackles and 3 assists. The Bills won despite being outgained in total yards 472 to 397.

==== NFC: Los Angeles Rams 30, Seattle Seahawks 20 ====
Los Angeles Rams at Seattle Seahawks – Game summary

Quarter	1	2	3	4	Total
Rams	3	17	0	10	30
Seahawks	0	10	3	7	20

at Lumen Field, Seattle, Washington

- Date: January 9, 2021
- Game time: 1:41 p.m. PST
- Game weather: Cloudy, 39 °F (4 °C)
- Game attendance: 0 (Note: Game played behind closed doors due to the COVID-19 pandemic in Washington.)
- Referee: John Hussey
- TV announcers (Fox): Joe Buck, Troy Aikman, Erin Andrews and Tom Rinaldi
- Recap, Game Book

Game information

First quarter

- LAR – Matt Gay 40-yard field goal, 3:52. Rams 3–0. Drive: 12 plays, 58 yards, 6:28.

Second quarter

- SEA – Jason Myers 50-yard field goal, 10:29. Tied 3–3. Drive: 5 plays, 19 yards, 1:50.
- LAR – Matt Gay 39-yard field goal, 7:51. Rams 6–3. Drive: 6 plays, 54 yards, 2:38.
- LAR – Darious Williams 42-yard interception return (Matt Gay kick), 6:40. Rams 13–3.
- SEA – DK Metcalf 51-yard pass from Russell Wilson (Jason Myers kick), 3:43. Rams 13–10. Drive: 5 plays, 74 yards, 2:57.
- LAR – Cam Akers 5-yard run (Matt Gay kick), 1:57. Rams 20–10. Drive: 5 plays, 75 yards, 1:46.

Third quarter

- SEA – Jason Myers 52-yard field goal, 13:45. Rams 20–13. Drive: 4 plays, 7 yards, 1:15.

Fourth quarter

- LAR – Matt Gay 36-yard field goal, 11:33. Rams 23–13. Drive: 9 plays, 52 yards, 5:07.
- LAR – Robert Woods 15-yard pass from Jared Goff (Matt Gay kick), 4:46. Rams 30–13. Drive: 4 plays, 36 yards, 2:16.
- SEA – DK Metcalf 12-yard pass from Russell Wilson (Jason Myers kick), 2:28. Rams 30–20. Drive: 8 plays, 76 yards, 2:18.

Top passers

- LAR – Jared Goff – 9/19, 155 yards, TD
- SEA – Russell Wilson – 11/27, 174 yards, 2 TD, INT

Top rushers

- LAR – Cam Akers – 28 rushes, 131 yards, TD
- SEA – Chris Carson – 16 rushes, 77 yards

Top receivers

- LAR – Cooper Kupp – 4 receptions, 78 yards
- SEA – DK Metcalf – 5 receptions, 96 yards, 2 TD

Rams starting quarterback Jared Goff came into this game as a backup to John Wolford – due to a broken thumb on his throwing hand suffered in week 16 – but a neck injury suffered by Wolford on the Rams' second possession resulted in Goff returning to the starting lineup. Though Goff completed less than half his passes, he led the Rams to victory, with rookie running back Cam Akers accumulating 176 scrimmage yards.

Seahawks' safety Jamal Adams landed an illegal low helmet-to-helmet hit on Wolford, knocking him out of the game during the Rams' second possession, after he completed a pair of passes to Cooper Kupp for gains of 15 and 13 yards that set up Matt Gay's 40-yard field goal, giving the team a 3–0 lead. In the second quarter, Michael Dickson's 48-yard punt pinned the Rams back on their own 5-yard line. Following a three-and-out, Johnny Hekker's 44-yard punt gave Seattle good field position on their own 49-yard line, where they proceeded to drive 19 yards and tie the game on a 50-yard field goal by Jason Myers. Los Angeles struck back with Goff's 44-yard completion to Kupp setting up Gay's second field goal, a 39-yard kick. Then they increased their lead to 13–3 when Darious Williams intercepted a pass from Seattle quarterback Russell Wilson and returned it 42 yards for a touchdown. Wilson quickly recovered, leading the team 79 yards in five plays and scoring on a 51-yard touchdown pass to DK Metcalf. On Los Angeles' next possession, Akers had a 44-yard reception and a 20-yard carry before taking the ball into the end zone on a 5-yard run, giving the Rams a 20–10 lead with 2 minutes left in the half.

Seattle cornerback D. J. Reed returned the second half kickoff 58 yards to Los Angeles' 41-yard line, setting up a 52-yard field goal by Myers that cut the score to 20–13. After six consecutive drives resulted in punts, Goff's 20-yard completion to Robert Woods started up a 9-play, 52-yard drive that ended on a 36-yard field goal from Gay, giving the Rams a 23–13 lead with 11:37 remaining. Then after a punt from each team, Rams linebacker Samson Ebukam forced a fumble from Reed on a punt return, which Micah Kiser recovered for Los Angeles on the Seahawks' 36-yard line, where the Rams went on to a 30–13 lead on Goff's 15-yard touchdown pass to Woods. Wilson responded with a 23-yard scramble and a 28-yard completion to Freddie Swain before throwing a 12-yard touchdown completion to Metcalf, with 2:34 left.

Goff was 9-for-19 for 155 yards and a touchdown, while defensive tackle Aaron Donald had two sacks, despite having to leave the game with a rib injury. Wilson was held to 11-for-27 for 174 yards, with two touchdowns – both to Metcalf, who had five receptions for 96 yards – and an interception, as well as 50 yards on 4 carries; linebacker Bobby Wagner had 11 solo tackles, 5 assists, and 1 sack. It would be Wilson's final playoff game as a Seahawk.

This was the second meeting between the Rams and Seahawks. The Rams had also won the previous meeting on the road in the 2004 Wild Card Round.

==== NFC: Tampa Bay Buccaneers 31, Washington Football Team 23 ====
Tampa Bay Buccaneers at Washington Football Team – Game summary

Quarter	1	2	3	4	Total
Buccaneers	9	9	0	13	31
Washington	0	7	9	7	23

at FedExField, Landover, Maryland

- Date: January 9, 2021
- Game time: 8:15 p.m. EST
- Game weather: Clear, 40 °F (4 °C)
- Game attendance: 0 (Note: Game played behind closed doors due to the COVID-19 pandemic in Maryland.)
- Referee: Scott Novak
- TV announcers (NBC): Mike Tirico, Tony Dungy and Kathryn Tappen
- Recap, Game Book

Game information

First quarter

- TB – Ryan Succop 29-yard field goal, 11:49. Buccaneers 3–0. Drive: 9 plays, 70 yards, 3:11.
- TB – Antonio Brown 36-yard pass from Tom Brady (kick blocked), 2:51. Buccaneers 9–0. Drive: 6 plays, 58 yards, 2:06.

Second quarter

- WAS – J. D. McKissic 2-yard run (Dustin Hopkins kick), 12:59. Buccaneers 9–7. Drive: 10 plays, 75 yards, 4:52.
- TB – Chris Godwin 27-yard pass from Tom Brady (run failed), 10:03. Buccaneers 15–7. Drive: 5 plays, 61 yards, 2:56.
- TB – Ryan Succop 23-yard field goal, 1:50. Buccaneers 18–7. Drive: 10 plays, 82 yards, 4:20.

Third quarter

- WAS – Dustin Hopkins 36-yard field goal, 11:46. Buccaneers 18–10. Drive: 7 plays, 52 yards, 3:14.
- WAS – Taylor Heinicke 8-yard run (pass failed), 2:14. Buccaneers 18–16. Drive: 7 plays, 61 yards, 3:39.

Fourth quarter

- TB – Ryan Succop 38-yard field goal, 13:32. Buccaneers 21–16. Drive: 9 plays, 55 yards, 3:42.
- TB – Leonard Fournette 3-yard run (Ryan Succop kick), 9:11. Buccaneers 28–16. Drive: 7 plays, 69 yards, 3:22.
- WAS – Steven Sims 11-yard pass from Taylor Heinicke (Dustin Hopkins kick), 4:51. Buccaneers 28–23. Drive: 11 plays, 75 yards, 4:20.
- TB – Ryan Succop 37-yard field goal, 2:49. Buccaneers 31–23. Drive: 7 plays, 58 yards, 2:02.

Top passers

- TB – Tom Brady – 22/40, 381 yards, 2 TD
- WAS – Taylor Heinicke – 26/44, 306 yards, TD, INT

Top rushers

- TB – Leonard Fournette – 19 rushes, 93 yards, TD
- WAS – Taylor Heinicke – 6 rushes, 46 yards, TD

Top receivers

- TB – Mike Evans – 6 receptions, 119 yards
- WAS – Cam Sims – 7 receptions, 104 yards

Tampa Bay racked up 507 yards of offense, 3 sacks, and forced 2 turnovers as they earned their first postseason victory since winning Super Bowl XXXVII.

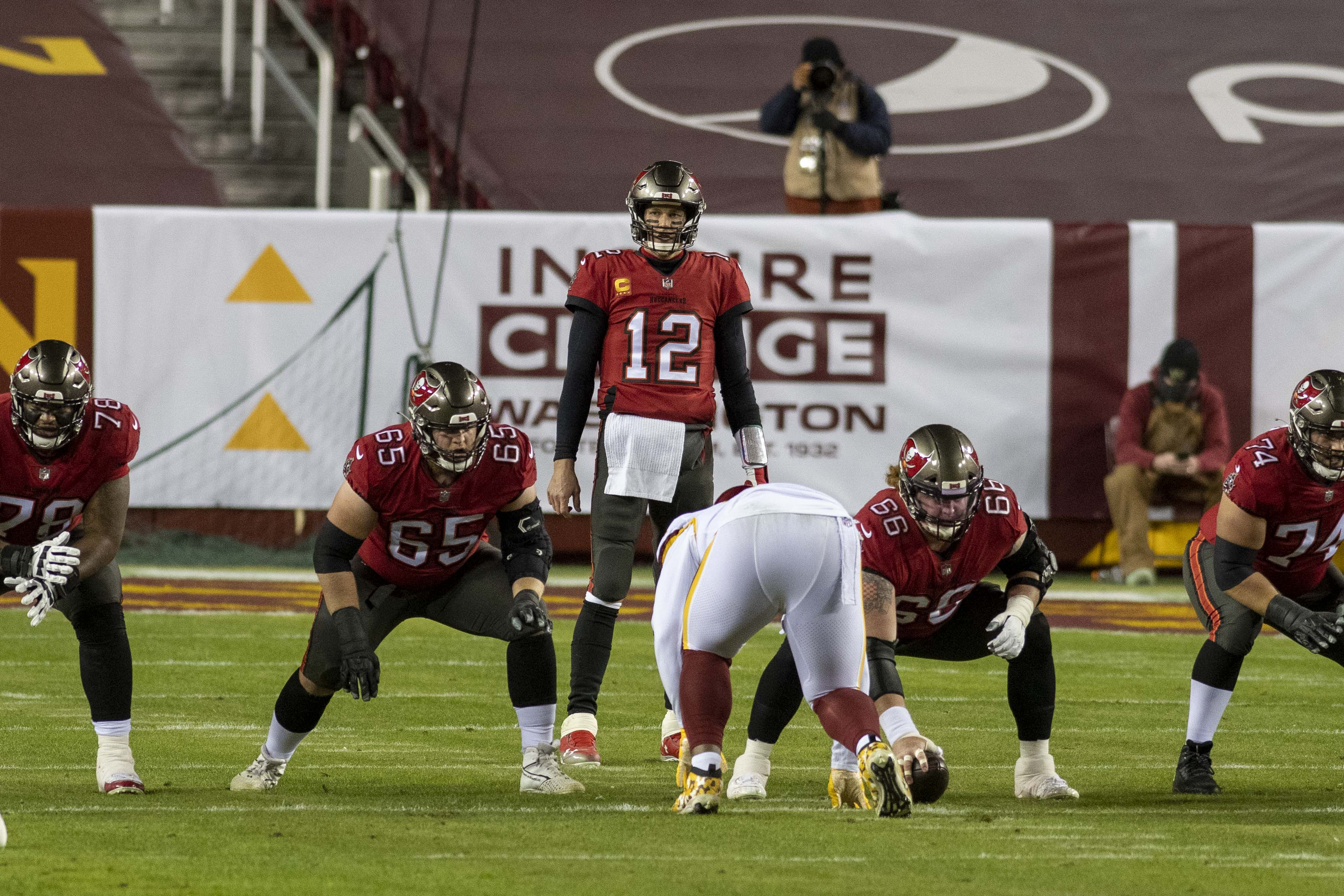
Tom Brady lined up to take a snap during the game

Buccaneers quarterback Tom Brady completed a 30-yard pass to Mike Evans and a 17-yard throw to Chris Godwin as he led the team to a 29-yard Ryan Succop field goal on the game's opening drive. Then after a punt from each team, Tampa Bay cornerback Sean Murphy-Bunting intercepted a pass from Taylor Heinicke, on the Buccaneers' 42-yard line. Tampa Bay then drove 58 yards in six plays to score on Brady's 36-yard touchdown pass to Antonio Brown, giving the team a 9–0 lead after Succop's extra point was blocked by Jeremy Reaves. But Heinicke started the next drive with completions to Logan Thomas and Terry McLaurin for gains of 24 and 18 yards, respectively, before J. D. McKissic finished it off with a 2-yard touchdown run, making the score 9–7 with 12:58 left in the half. Dustin Hopkins' short kickoff gave the Buccaneers a first down on their own 39-yard line. On the next play, Brown took a pitch on an end-around and ran for a 22-yard gain. Three plays later, Brady threw a 27-yard touchdown pass to Godwin, giving the Buccaneers a 15–7 lead after their two-point conversion attempt failed. Then after a punt, Brady completed 3-of-5 passes for 65 yards on an 82-yard drive that ended with Succop's 23-yard field goal, giving Tampa Bay an 18–7 lead at halftime.

Washington cut their deficit to 18–10 with the opening drive of the third quarter, converting Heinicke's 29-yard completion to Thomas into a 36-yard Hopkins field goal. Later in the period, Washington defensive tackle Daron Payne forced a fumble from Ke'Shawn Vaughn that Jon Bostic recovered for Washington on their 39-yard line. Heinicke then completed a 19-yard pass to Cam Sims and rushed for a 13-yard gain before taking the ball into the end zone himself on an 8-yard touchdown run, cutting the deficit to 18–16 after an unsuccessful 2-point try. Tampa Bay responded with a 9-play, 55-yard drive, the longest a 23-yard catch by tight end Cameron Brate. Succop finished it off with a 38-yard field goal, giving the Buccaneers a 21–16 lead with 13:38 left. Following a Washington punt, Brady completed passes to Evans for gains of 20 and 19 yards, while Leonard Fournette rushed three times for 22 yards, the last carry a 3-yard touchdown run that put his team up 28–16. On Washington's next drive, Heinicke completed 8-of-10 passes for 71 yards and finishing the drive with an 11-yard touchdown completion to Sims. With the score now 28–23 and 4:57 left, Brady completed passes of 35 yards to Evans and 16 yards to Godwin, setting up Succop's 37-yard field goal with 2:49 left. Washington then drove across midfield, but after two incompletions and an 11-yard sack by Lavonte David, Heinicke's 4th down pass was incomplete, enabling Tampa Bay to run out the rest of the game clock.

Brady completed 22-for-40 passes for 381 yards and two touchdowns, Fournette rushed for 93 yards and a touchdown, while also catching 4 passes for 39 yards. Evans caught 6 passes for 119 yards, and David had 8 solo tackles and a sack. In his second NFL start, Heinicke completed 26-for-44 passes for 306 yards with a touchdown and an interception, and he was also Washington's leading rusher with 6 carries for 46 yards and a touchdown. Sims had 7 receptions for 104 yards, and Reaves blocked an extra point and had 9 solo tackles.

This was the third postseason meeting between Tampa Bay and Washington. The series was tied 1–1.

=== Sunday, January 10, 2021 ===
==== AFC: Baltimore Ravens 20, Tennessee Titans 13 ====
Baltimore Ravens vs. Tennessee Titans – Game summary

Quarter	1	2	3	4	Total
Ravens	0	10	7	3	20
Titans	10	0	0	3	13

at Nissan Stadium, Nashville, Tennessee

- Date: January 10, 2021
- Game time: 12:05 p.m. CST
- Game weather: Cloudy, 33 °F (1 °C)
- Game attendance: 14,029 (Note: Attendance was limited to 21% of the total capacity of Nissan Stadium (14,520), due to the COVID-19 pandemic in Tennessee.)
- Referee: Jerome Boger
- TV announcers (ABC/ESPN): Steve Levy, Brian Griese, Louis Riddick and Lisa Salters
- Recap, Game Book

Game information

First quarter

- TEN – A. J. Brown 10-yard pass from Ryan Tannehill (Stephen Gostkowski kick), 5:39. Titans 7–0. Drive: 10 plays, 70 yards, 6:11.
- TEN – Stephen Gostkowski 45-yard field goal, 1:38. Titans 10–0. Drive: 7 plays, 45 yards, 2:42.

Second quarter

- BAL – Justin Tucker 33-yard field goal, 9:59. Titans 10–3. Drive: 12 plays, 60 yards, 6:39.
- BAL – Lamar Jackson 48-yard run (Justin Tucker kick), 2:32. Tied 10–10. Drive: 7 plays, 82 yards, 4:03.

Third quarter

- BAL – J. K. Dobbins 4-yard run (Justin Tucker kick), 9:01. Ravens 17–10. Drive: 10 plays, 77 yards, 5:59.

Fourth quarter

- TEN – Stephen Gostkowski 25-yard field goal, 14:56. Ravens 17–13. Drive: 7 plays, 51 yards, 3:15.
- BAL – Justin Tucker 51-yard field goal, 4:19. Ravens 20–13. Drive: 9 plays, 52 yards, 5:41.

Top passers

- BAL – Lamar Jackson – 17/24, 179 yards, INT
- TEN – Ryan Tannehill – 18/26, 165 yards, TD, INT

Top rushers

- BAL – Lamar Jackson – 16 rushes, 136 yards, TD
- TEN – Derrick Henry – 18 rushes, 40 yards

Top receivers

- BAL – Marquise Brown – 7 receptions, 109 yards
- TEN – A. J. Brown – 6 receptions, 83 yards, TD

In a game between the two teams with the most rushing yards during the 2020 season, Baltimore came out on top, outgaining the Titans in total yards 401–209, and holding them to just 51 yards on the ground. Tennessee running back Derrick Henry, the NFL's leading rusher in 2020, was held to just 40 yards on 18 carries.

Tennessee opened up the scoring on their second possession with a 10-play, 75-yard drive, featuring a 28-yard completion from Ryan Tannehill to A. J. Brown, before Brown's 10-yard touchdown catch made the score 7–0. Then on Baltimore's next drive, Malcolm Butler intercepted a pass from Lamar Jackson on the Tennessee 28-yard line. Tannehill went on to complete a 35-yard pass to Anthony Firkser that set up Stephen Gostkowski's 45-yard field goal giving the Titans a 10–0 first quarter lead. Baltimore responded by moving the ball 65 yards in 12 plays, including a 28-yard completion from Jackson to receiver Marquise Brown. Justin Tucker finished the drive with a 33-yard field goal, that made the score 10–3 five minutes into the second quarter. Then after a punt by the Titans, the Ravens tied the score at 10–10 with Jackson's 48-yard touchdown run on a 3rd and 9.

Baltimore took a 17–10 lead with their opening drive of the second half, with Jackson completing 4-of-4 passes for 30 yards and rushing four times for 34 yards, on the way to J. K. Dobbins' 4-yard touchdown run. Following a pair of punts, a roughing the passer penalty against Baltimore defensive end Derek Wolfe turned A. J. Brown's 18-yard reception into a 33-yard gain. Tennessee went on to make the score 17–13 with Gostkowski's 25-yard field goal, on the last play of the third quarter. Baltimore responded with a drive to the Titans' 34-yard line, but Tucker missed a 52-yard field goal. The Titans then drove to Baltimore's 40 yard line, but the drive stalled and they punted. The Ravens responded with another scoring drive as Jackson completed 3-of-3 passes for 30 yards and rushed for 14 yards, setting up a successful 51-yard field goal for Tucker, giving the Ravens a 20–13 lead with 4:23 left. Marcus Peters ended Tennessee's next drive with an interception of Tannehill, enabling the Ravens' offense to run out the clock with four running plays, including a 33-yard run from Jackson.

Jackson completed 17-for-24 passes for 179 yards with an interception, and was the game's leading rusher with 16 carries for 136 yards and a touchdown as he recorded his first playoff victory in his career. Marquise Brown was the game's leading receiver with 7 catches for 109 yards. Tannehill finished the day 18-for-26 for 165 yards, a touchdown, and an interception; Tennessee linebacker Harold Landry had 8 tackles, 2 assists, and 2 sacks.

This was the fifth postseason meeting between the Ravens and Titans. The series was split with the road team winning all four games. As of 2024, the Ravens are the most recent AFC wild card team win on the road and play in the divisional round. In contrast, at least one NFC wild card has advanced to the divisional round every season under the 14-team format.

==== NFC: New Orleans Saints 21, Chicago Bears 9 ====
Chicago Bears vs. New Orleans Saints – Game summary

Quarter	1	2	3	4	Total
Bears	0	3	0	6	9
Saints	7	0	7	7	21

at Mercedes-Benz Superdome, New Orleans, Louisiana

- Date: January 10, 2021
- Game time: 3:40 p.m. CST
- Game weather: None (indoor stadium)
- Game attendance: 3,000 (Note: Attendance was limited to 3,000 due to the COVID-19 pandemic in Louisiana.)
- Referee: Alex Kemp
- TV announcers (CBS and Nickelodeon):
  - CBS: Jim Nantz, Tony Romo, Tracy Wolfson and Jay Feely
  - Nickelodeon: Noah Eagle, Nate Burleson, Gabrielle Nevaeh Green and Lex Lumpkin
- Recap, Game Book

Game information

First quarter

- NO – Michael Thomas 11-yard pass from Drew Brees (Wil Lutz kick), 5:09. Saints 7–0. Drive: 8 plays, 55 yards, 4:17.

Second quarter

- CHI – Cairo Santos 36-yard field goal, 8:06. Saints 7–3. Drive: 6 plays, 6 yards, 3:24.

Third quarter

- NO – Latavius Murray 6-yard pass from Drew Brees (Wil Lutz kick), 4:08. Saints 14–3. Drive: 12 plays, 85 yards, 7:29.

Fourth quarter

- NO – Alvin Kamara 3-yard run (Wil Lutz kick), 8:50. Saints 21–3. Drive: 15 plays, 64 yards, 8:51
- CHI – Jimmy Graham 19-yard pass from Mitchell Trubisky, 0:00. Saints 21–9. Drive: 11 plays, 99 yards, 2:19.

Top passers

- CHI – Mitchell Trubisky – 19/29, 199 yards, TD
- NO – Drew Brees – 28/39, 265 yards, 2 TD

Top rushers

- CHI – David Montgomery – 12 rushes, 31 yards
- NO – Alvin Kamara – 23 rushes, 99 yards, TD

Top receivers

- CHI – Allen Robinson – 6 receptions, 55 yards
- NO – Deonte Harris – 7 receptions, 83 yards

Although the Bears finished with an 8–8 record, they managed to make the playoffs after the Los Angeles Rams beat the Arizona Cardinals in the final week of the season. Even though the two teams finished with identical 8–8 records, the Bears advanced with a better record of common opponents over the Cardinals with key wins over the Rams, Carolina Panthers, Detroit Lions, and New York Giants. The Bears were 3–2 while the Cardinals were 1–4. As for the Saints, they finished 12–4, falling short of going 3 consecutive years of 13–3 records, but still making the playoffs for the fourth year in a row. The game was the two teams' first meeting in the playoffs since the 2006 NFC Championship Game.

New Orleans held Chicago to just 239 yards and a single field goal until the closing seconds of the fourth quarter as they progressed to the Divisional round.

In the first quarter, Saints receiver Deonte Harris returned a punt 7 yards to the New Orleans 45-yard line, before he caught a 17-yard pass as his team drove 50 yards on 8 plays to score on Drew Brees's 11-yard touchdown throw to Michael Thomas. Chicago seemed primed to respond, as Mitchell Trubisky completed a 28-yard pass to Javon Wims, on the Saints' 40-yard line. On the next play, the Bears ran a trick play in which running back David Montgomery took the snap out of the wildcat formation and gave the ball to Cordarrelle Patterson, who then pitched the ball to Trubisky. The play initially worked perfectly, as Trubisky threw the ball to a wide open Wims in the end zone, only to see him drop the pass. This turned out to be crucial as the drive ended in a turnover on downs on the Saints' 34-yard line. New Orleans then drove to the Bears' 32-yard line, but Wil Lutz missed a 52-yard field goal attempt. In the second quarter, Bears safety Tashaun Gipson forced a fumble from Taysom Hill that John Jenkins recovered for Chicago, on the Saints' 24-yard line. This led to Cairo Santos' 36-yard field goal that made the score 7–3; the next four drives ended in punts, with no additional scoring to the half.

After the Bears punted on the first drive of the third quarter, Brees completed 6-of-7 passes for 72 yards, the longest being a 38-yard throw to Thomas. He finished the drive with a 6-yard touchdown completion to running back Latavius Murray, giving the Saints a 14–3 lead. The Bears had to punt again after three plays, and Harris returned it 11 yards to New Orleans' 36-yard line. From there, the Saints drove 64 yards in 15 plays to go up 21–3 on Alvin Kamara's 3-yard touchdown run with 8:50 left. Following another Bears punt, New Orleans drove all the way to the Chicago 1-yard line, but ended up turning the ball over on downs. In the final 2:19 of the game, the Bears drove 99 yards in 11 plays and scored on the final play of the game, with Trubisky's 19-yard touchdown pass to Jimmy Graham.

Brees completed 28-for-39 passes for 265 yards and 2 touchdowns, Kamara had 23 carries for 99 yards and a touchdown, along with 2 receptions for 17 yards; Harris caught 7 passes for 83 yards and returned 3 punts for 22 yards. Trubisky finished the game 19-for-29 for 199 yards and a touchdown.

This was the first ever telecast of the NFL on Nickelodeon.

This was the third postseason meeting between the Bears and Saints. The Bears had won the previous two meetings, including the 2006 NFC Championship Game. As of 2025, this was the most recent playoff win for the Saints.

==== AFC: Cleveland Browns 48, Pittsburgh Steelers 37 ====
Cleveland Browns vs. Pittsburgh Steelers – Game summary

Quarter	1	2	3	4	Total
Browns	28	7	0	13	48
Steelers	0	10	13	14	37

at Heinz Field, Pittsburgh, Pennsylvania

- Date: January 10, 2021
- Game time: 8:15 p.m. EST
- Game weather: Clear, 34 °F (1 °C)
- Game attendance: 0 (Note: Game played behind closed doors due to the COVID-19 pandemic in Pennsylvania.)
- Referee: Shawn Smith
- TV announcers (NBC): Al Michaels, Cris Collinsworth and Michele Tafoya
- Recap, Game Book

Game information

First quarter

- CLE – Karl Joseph fumble recovery in the end zone (Cody Parkey kick), 14:46. Browns 7–0.
- CLE – Jarvis Landry 40-yard pass from Baker Mayfield (Cody Parkey kick), 9:46. Browns 14–0. Drive: 3 plays, 46 yards, 0:58.
- CLE – Kareem Hunt 11-yard run (Cody Parkey kick), 4:40. Browns 21–0. Drive: 6 plays, 65 yards, 3:00.
- CLE – Kareem Hunt 8-yard run (Cody Parkey kick), 1:56. Browns 28–0. Drive: 3 plays, 15 yards, 1:22.

Second quarter

- PIT – James Conner 1-yard run (Chris Boswell kick), 1:44. Browns 28–7. Drive: 13 plays, 89 yards, 5:36.
- CLE – Austin Hooper 7-yard pass from Baker Mayfield (Cody Parkey kick), 0:34. Browns 35–7. Drive: 9 plays, 64 yards, 1:10.
- PIT – Chris Boswell 49-yard field goal, 0:00. Browns 35–10. Drive: 5 plays, 37 yards, 0:34.

Third quarter

- PIT – Eric Ebron 17-yard pass from Ben Roethlisberger (pass failed), 7:22. Browns 35–16. Drive: 8 plays, 84 yards, 3:45.
- PIT – JuJu Smith-Schuster 5-yard pass from Ben Roethlisberger (Chris Boswell kick), 2:57. Browns 35–23. Drive: 12 plays, 68 yards, 3:25.

Fourth quarter

- CLE – Nick Chubb 40-yard pass from Baker Mayfield (Cody Parkey kick), 12:32. Browns 42–23. Drive: 6 plays, 80 yards, 2:20.
- PIT – Chase Claypool 29-yard pass from Ben Roethlisberger (pass failed), 11:08. Browns 42–29. Drive: 4 plays, 76 yards, 1:24.
- CLE – Cody Parkey 24-yard field goal, 4:28. Browns 45–29. Drive: 13 plays, 59 yards, 6:40.
- CLE – Cody Parkey 37-yard field goal, 2:51. Browns 48–29. Drive: 4 plays, 6 yards, 0:25.
- PIT – Chase Claypool 7-yard pass from Ben Roethlisberger (Ben Roethlisberger–James Conner pass), 1:09. Browns 48–37. Drive: 8 plays, 77 yards, 1:42.

Top passers

- CLE – Baker Mayfield – 21/34, 263 yards, 3 TD
- PIT – Ben Roethlisberger – 47/68, 501 yards, 4 TD, 4 INT

Top rushers

- CLE – Nick Chubb – 18 rushes, 76 yards
- PIT – James Conner – 11 rushes, 37 yards, TD

Top receivers

- CLE – Jarvis Landry – 5 receptions, 92 yards, TD
- PIT – JuJu Smith-Schuster – 13 receptions, 157 yards, TD

Despite missing four players and five coaches – including head coach Kevin Stefanski – due to positive COVID-19 tests, Cleveland built up a 35–10 first half lead, forced five turnovers, and held on to earn their first playoff win since the 1994 season. This was also the Browns' first playoff appearance since 2002, their first road win against the Steelers since 2003, and their first road playoff win since 1969.

The Browns took a 7–0 lead on the first play from scrimmage when a high snap from Pittsburgh center Maurkice Pouncey sailed over quarterback Ben Roethlisberger's head and went into the end zone, where safety Karl Joseph recovered the ball for a touchdown. Then on Pittsburgh's next drive, cornerback M. J. Stewart intercepted a pass from Roethlisberger, giving the Browns the ball on the Steelers' 46-yard line. Two plays later, Baker Mayfield threw a short pass to Jarvis Landry in the middle of the field and he ran it 40 yards into the end zone to increase Cleveland's lead to 14–0. Pittsburgh then had to punt after three plays, and the Browns drove 65 yards in 6 plays, the longest a 20-yard run from Nick Chubb. Kareem Hunt finished the drive with an 11-yard touchdown run, to put the Browns up 21–0. Then, Roethlisberger threw another interception, this one to safety Sheldrick Redwine, who returned it 30 yards to the Steelers' 15-yard line. This set up Hunt's 8-yard touchdown run that gave the Browns a 28–0 first quarter lead – tying an NFL playoff record for points in the first quarter.

In the second quarter, Roethlisberger threw his third interception to defensive end Porter Gustin, that gave the Browns the ball on their 47-yard line, but the Steelers' defense was able to force a punt. Pittsburgh then drove 89 yards in 13 plays, featuring a 27-yard completion from Roethlisberger to receiver James Washington. Running back James Conner also made some crucial plays, converting a 4th and 1 on the Browns' 2-yard line with a 1-yard run, and then running the ball into the end zone on the next play to make the score 28–7. D'Ernest Johnson returned the resulting kickoff 33 yards to the Browns' 36-yard line. Then, after Mayfield scrambled to convert a 3rd and 6, he completed a 21-yard pass to Chubb to the Steelers' 32-yard line. Three plays later, Mayfield finished the possession with a 7-yard touchdown pass to tight end Austin Hooper, giving the Browns a 35–7 lead with 37 seconds left in the half. Still, Pittsburgh managed to respond, driving 32 yards in five plays to score on Chris Boswell's 49-yard field goal, for a halftime score of 35–10.

In the third quarter, the Browns punted on their opening drive, and Roethlisberger completed eight consecutive passes for 84 yards, the last a 17-yard touchdown completion to tight end Eric Ebron, cutting the score to 35–16 after a failed 2-point conversion attempt. Following another Browns' punt, Roethlisberger completed passes to JuJu Smith-Schuster for gains of 15 and 27 yards as the team drove 68 yards in 12 plays. Faced with 4th and goal on the Browns' 5-yard line, Roethlisberger threw another pass to Smith-Schuster for a touchdown, cutting their deficit to 35–23.

After a Browns punt, the Steelers drove to a 4th and 1 on their 46-yard line in the closing seconds of the third quarter. From there, Pittsburgh head coach Mike Tomlin decided to let the play clock run down to zero in an attempt to draw the Browns offside, and then punt the ball on 4th and 6. Tomlin later received criticism for declining to attempt a fourth down conversion. Cleveland got the ball seconds into the fourth quarter, and increased their lead to 42–23, with Mayfield completing passes to Landry for gains of 17 and 14 yards before finishing the drive with a 40-yard touchdown pass to Chubb. Roethlisberger completed four consecutive passes for 76 yards for the Steelers, the last a 29-yard touchdown pass to rookie receiver Chase Claypool. This made the score 42–29 with 6:39 left, following another failed 2-point try. The Browns stepped up to cut off any chance of a comeback; Johnson returned the kickoff 30 yards to the Browns' 35-yard line, sparking a 13-play, 59-yard drive that ended with Cody Parkey's 24-yard field goal that put the team up 45–29. Then, linebacker Sione Takitaki recorded Cleveland's fourth interception of the day, picking off a pass from Roethlisberger and returning it 23 yards to the Steelers' 25-yard line. This led to another Parkey field goal that gave the Browns a 48–29 lead with 2:54 left. Roethlisberger led the Steelers 77 yards in 8 plays, including his 33-yard completion to Smith-Schuster on 4th and 10, on the way to his 7-yard touchdown pass to Claypool. Then, his 2-point conversion pass to Connor made the score 48–37. The Browns recovered Pittsburgh's ensuing onside kick attempt and ran out the rest of the clock.

Mayfield finished his first career playoff game with 21-for-34 for 263 yards and three touchdowns. Landry was his top target with 5 catches for 92 yards and a touchdown. Chubb was the top rusher of the day with 18 carries for 76 yards, while also catching 4 passes for 69 yards and a touchdown. Stewart had 9 tackles (1 for loss) and an interception. Roethlisberger completed 47-of-68 passes for 501 yards and 4 touchdowns, with 4 interceptions. His 47 completions set an NFL record, his 68 passes set an NFL postseason record, and his 501 yards was the second highest total in postseason history. Smith-Schuster had 13 receptions for 157 yards and a touchdown, while Diontae Johnson added 11 receptions for 117 yards.

This was the third postseason meeting between the Steelers and Browns. The Steelers had won the previous two in the 1994 and 2002 seasons, which were the only playoff games the Browns had been in during that span.

== Divisional round ==
=== Saturday, January 16, 2021 ===
==== NFC: Green Bay Packers 32, Los Angeles Rams 18 ====
Los Angeles Rams vs. Green Bay Packers – Game summary

Quarter	1	2	3	4	Total
Rams	3	7	8	0	18
Packers	3	16	6	7	32

at Lambeau Field, Green Bay, Wisconsin

- Date: January 16, 2021
- Game time: 3:35 p.m. CST
- Game weather: Cloudy, 35 °F (2 °C)
- Game attendance: 7,439 (Note: Attendance at the game was limited due to the COVID-19 pandemic in Wisconsin.)
- Referee: Ronald Torbert
- TV announcers (Fox): Kevin Burkhardt, Daryl Johnston, Pam Oliver and Kristina Pink
- Recap, Game Book

Game information

First quarter

- GB – Mason Crosby 24-yard field goal, 8:39. Packers 3–0. Drive: 12 plays, 63 yards, 4:46.
- LAR – Matt Gay 37-yard field goal, 4:36. Tied 3–3. Drive: 8 plays, 62 yards, 4:03.

Second quarter

- GB – Davante Adams 1-yard pass from Aaron Rodgers (Mason Crosby kick), 11:37. Packers 10–3. Drive: 14 plays, 84 yards, 7:59.
- GB – Aaron Rodgers 1-yard run (pass failed), 3:29. Packers 16–3. 9 plays, 47 yards, 5:46.
- LAR – Van Jefferson 4-yard pass from Jared Goff (Matt Gay kick), 0:29. Packers 16–10. Drive: 9 plays, 75 yards, 3:00.
- GB – Mason Crosby 39-yard field goal, 0:00. Packers 19–10. Drive: 5 plays, 54 yards, 0:29.

Third quarter

- GB – Aaron Jones 1-yard run (pass failed), 12:10. Packers 25–10. Drive: 6 plays, 75 yards, 2:50.
- LAR – Cam Akers 7-yard run (Jared Goff–Cam Akers pass), 1:41. Packers 25–18. Drive: 11 plays, 79 yards, 5:45.

Fourth quarter

- GB – Allen Lazard 58-yard pass from Aaron Rodgers (Mason Crosby kick), 6:52. Packers 32–18. Drive: 5 plays, 73 yards, 2:54.

Top passers

- LAR – Jared Goff – 21/27, 174 yards, TD
- GB – Aaron Rodgers – 23/36, 296 yards, 2 TD

Top rushers

- LAR – Cam Akers – 18 carries, 90 yards, TD
- GB – Aaron Jones – 14 carries, 99 yards, TD

Top receivers

- LAR – Josh Reynolds – 3 receptions, 65 yards
- GB – Allen Lazard – 4 receptions, 96 yards, TD

Despite losing Pro Bowl offensive tackle David Bakhtiari to injury in practice prior to Week 17, the Packers racked up 487 yards and 32 points against a Rams defense that finished the 2020 season leading the NFL in fewest points and yards allowed. The Rams were dealing with a myriad of injuries themselves, with leading receiver Cooper Kupp out with knee bursitis suffered in the closing seconds of their previous win, starting quarterback Jared Goff playing with a surgically repaired thumb on his throwing hand just twelve days prior, and two-time defensive player of the year Aaron Donald severely hampered after tearing rib cartilage the previous week.

The Packers scored on their first drive, with a 12-play, 63-yard possession that featured a 27-yard completion from Aaron Rodgers to Equanimeous St. Brown; Mason Crosby's 24-yard field goal gave the Packers a 3–0 lead. The Rams responded as Goff's completions to Josh Reynolds and Robert Woods set up a 37-yard field goal from Matt Gay to tie the game. Green Bay then drove 84 yards in 14 plays to take a 10–3 lead on Davante Adams' 1-yard touchdown reception with 11:37 left in the half. The Rams then had to punt after three plays, and a 15-yard unsportsmanlike conduct penalty against their receiver Nsimba Webster turned Tavon Austin's 8-yard return into a 23-yard gain, giving the Packers a first down on the Rams' 47-yard line. From there, Rodgers completed 5-of-5 passes for 44 yards, and he scored on a 1-yard touchdown run, giving Green Bay a 16–3 lead after a botched snap on the extra point attempt. The Rams took the ball back with 3:39 left in the half, and drove 75 yards in 9 plays, the longest a 21-yard catch by Reynolds. Goff finished the drive with a 4-yard touchdown pass to Van Jefferson, making the score 16–10 with 29 seconds left in the half. Following the kickoff, Rodgers' completions to Adams and Robert Tonyan for gains of 21 and 33 yards enabled Crosby to kick a 39-yard field goal as time expired in the half, making the score 19–10.

On the first play of the third quarter, Packers running back Aaron Jones ran for a 60-yard gain to the Rams' 15-yard line. Three plays later, he scored on a 1-yard touchdown run, giving the Packers a 25–10 lead after a failed 2-point conversion attempt. After a punt from each team, Goff completed 6-of-6 passes for 51 yards on an 11-play, 74-yard drive; Cam Akers finished the drive with a 7-yard run from the wildcat formation. On the ensuing 2-point conversion, Goff threw the ball to Jefferson, who then lateralled it to Akers before reaching the end zone, making the score 25–18, with 1:45 left in the quarter. Early in the fourth quarter, the Rams forced a punt, giving them a chance to drive for the tying touchdown; but Packers nose tackle Kenny Clark made a crucial sack on Goff that eventually forced the Rams to punt. On the ensuing drive, the Rams forced an A. J. Dillon fumble in Green Bay territory, but the ball squirted right to Rodgers who was trailing the play. The Packers then converted a short third down, and two plays later put the game away with Rodgers' 58-yard touchdown pass to Allen Lazard.

Rodgers completed 23 of 36 passes for 296 yards and 2 touchdowns, while adding a rushing touchdown as well. Jones had 14 carries for 99 yards and a touchdown, along with a 14-yard catch and Lazard was the top receiver of the game with 4 receptions for 96 yards and a touchdown. Goff completed 21 of 27 passes for 174 yards and a touchdown, while Akers was the Rams' top rusher of the game with 18 carries for 90 yards and a touchdown, and also caught a pass for 6 yards.

This was the third postseason meeting between the Rams and Packers. The series was split 1–1.

==== AFC: Buffalo Bills 17, Baltimore Ravens 3 ====
Baltimore Ravens vs. Buffalo Bills – Game summary

Quarter	1	2	3	4	Total
Ravens	0	3	0	0	3
Bills	3	0	14	0	17

at Bills Stadium, Orchard Park, New York

- Date: January 16, 2021
- Game time: 8:15 p.m. EST
- Game weather: Mostly cloudy, 34 °F (1 °C)
- Game attendance: 6,772 (Note: Attendance at the game was limited to 6,772 due to the COVID-19 pandemic in New York.)
- Referee: Carl Cheffers
- TV announcers (NBC): Al Michaels, Cris Collinsworth and Michele Tafoya
- Recap, Game Book

Game information

First quarter

- BUF – Tyler Bass 28-yard field goal, 2:57. Bills 3–0. Drive: 5 plays, 28 yards, 1:47.

Second quarter

- BAL – Justin Tucker 34-yard field goal, 0:04. Tied 3–3. Drive: 8 plays, 57 yards, 0:59.

Third quarter

- BUF – Stefon Diggs 3-yard pass from Josh Allen (Tyler Bass kick), 9:29. Bills 10–3. Drive: 11 plays, 66 yards, 5:31.
- BUF – Taron Johnson 101-yard interception return (Tyler Bass kick), 0:41. Bills 17–3.

Fourth quarter

- No scoring plays.

Top passers

- BAL – Lamar Jackson – 14/24, 162 yards, INT
- BUF – Josh Allen – 23/37, 206 yards, TD

Top rushers

- BAL – J. K. Dobbins – 10 rushes, 42 yards
- BAL – Gus Edwards – 10 rushes, 42 yards
- BUF – Devin Singletary – 7 rushes, 25 yards

Top receivers

- BAL – Marquise Brown – 4 receptions, 87 yards
- BUF – Stefon Diggs – 8 receptions, 106 yards, TD

In a game largely controlled by defense, Bills cornerback Taron Johnson's postseason record-tying 101-yard interception return gave Buffalo a two-score lead that the Ravens could not overcome. Windy conditions also played a major role in the game, with each team missing two field goal attempts and one punt went for just 23 yards.

Baltimore took the opening kickoff and drove 46 yards to the Bills' 23-yard line, but the drive ended there as Justin Tucker hit the uprights on a 41-yard field goal attempt. Both teams had to punt on their next drive, and Sam Koch's 23-yard kick gave the Bills the ball on the Baltimore 38-yard line. From there, they drove 17 yards to take a 3–0 lead on a 28-yard field goal by rookie kicker Tyler Bass. After a Ravens punt, Buffalo drove to the Baltimore 23-yard line, but Bass missed a 43-yard field goal kick with 13:21 left in the half. Baltimore fared no better, as their next drive also ended in a missed field goal, this time with Tucker hitting the uprights again from 46 yards. After three more punts, Baltimore finally managed to get on the board, converting a 30-yard completion from Lamar Jackson to Marquise Brown into a 34-yard field goal by Tucker on the last play of the half.

Buffalo took the second half kickoff and drove 66 yards in 11 plays, the longest a 20-yard completion from Josh Allen to Stefon Diggs. On the last play, Allen's 3-yard touchdown pass to Diggs gave Buffalo a 10–3 lead. Baltimore seemed primed to respond, as they moved the ball to a 2nd and goal from the Bills' 9-yard line with 58 seconds left in the third quarter. But on the next play, Johnson picked off a pass from Jackson in the end zone and returned it 101 yards for a touchdown, increasing the Bills' lead to 17–3. Jackson suffered a concussion on the next drive and had to leave the game, and was replaced at quarterback by Tyler Huntley. Baltimore had two possessions in the fourth quarter, but each one ended in a turnover on downs with the second ending at the Buffalo 10-yard-line.

Allen completed 23 of 37 passes for 206 yards and a touchdown and Diggs had 8 receptions for 106 yards and a touchdown. In addition to his interception, Johnson also had six tackles. Jackson completed 14/24 passes for 162 yards and one interception, while also rushing for 42 yards.

=== Sunday, January 17, 2021 ===
==== AFC: Kansas City Chiefs 22, Cleveland Browns 17 ====
Cleveland Browns vs. Kansas City Chiefs – Game summary

Quarter	1	2	3	4	Total
Browns	3	0	7	7	17
Chiefs	6	13	3	0	22

at Arrowhead Stadium, Kansas City, Missouri

- Date: January 17, 2021
- Game time: 2:05 p.m. CST
- Game weather: Cloudy, 40 °F (4 °C)
- Game attendance: 16,730 (Note: Attendance at the game was limited due to the COVID-19 pandemic in Missouri.)
- Referee: Clay Martin
- TV announcers (CBS): Jim Nantz, Tony Romo, Tracy Wolfson, Evan Washburn and Jay Feely
- Recap, Game Book

Game information

First quarter

- KC – Patrick Mahomes 1-yard run (kick failed), 9:11. Chiefs 6–0. Drive: 10 plays, 75 yards, 5:49.
- CLE – Cody Parkey 46-yard field goal, 2:41. Chiefs 6–3. Drive: 12 plays, 47 yards, 6:30.

Second quarter

- KC – Travis Kelce 20-yard pass from Patrick Mahomes (Harrison Butker kick), 13:48. Chiefs 13–3. Drive: 7 plays, 75 yards, 3:53.
- KC – Harrison Butker 50-yard field goal, 3:09. Chiefs 16–3. Drive: 13 plays, 53 yards, 6:29.
- KC – Harrison Butker 28-yard field goal, 0:02. Chiefs 19–3. Drive: 9 plays, 70 yards, 1:32.

Third quarter

- CLE – Jarvis Landry 4-yard pass from Baker Mayfield (Cody Parkey kick), 9:29. Chiefs 19–10. Drive: 8 plays, 77 yards, 4:38.
- KC – Harrison Butker 33-yard field goal, 4:24. Chiefs 22–10. Drive: 11 plays, 60 yards, 5:05.

Fourth quarter

- CLE – Kareem Hunt 3-yard run (Cody Parkey kick), 11:07. Chiefs 22–17. Drive: 18 plays, 75 yards, 8:17.

Top passers

- CLE – Baker Mayfield – 23/37, 204 yards, TD, INT
- KC – Patrick Mahomes – 21/30, 255 yards, TD

Top rushers

- CLE – Nick Chubb – 13 carries, 69 yards
- KC – Darrel Williams – 13 carries, 78 yards

Top receivers

- CLE – Rashard Higgins – 5 receptions, 88 yards
- KC – Tyreek Hill – 8 receptions, 110 yards

Kansas City built up a 19–3 first half lead and survived losing their starting quarterback Patrick Mahomes in the second half, in order to become the first AFC team to host three consecutive conference championship games.

On the opening drive, Mahomes completed 4 of 4 passes for 41 yards, including a 26-yard completion to Tyreek Hill, as the team drove 75 yards in 10 plays to score on his 1-yard touchdown run. Harrison Butker missed the extra point, keeping the score at 6–0. Cleveland responded with a 12-play, 47-yard scoring drive, featuring a 27-yard pass from Baker Mayfield to tight end David Njoku. Two key defensive plays by L'Jarius Sneed, a tackle for a 3-yard loss and an 8-yard sack on Mayfield, forced Cleveland to settle for Cody Parkey's 46-yard field goal to make the score 6–3. On the second play of the Chiefs' next drive, Mecole Hardman ran a shovel pass 42 yards to the Browns' 25-yard line, and the team went on to take a 13–3 lead with Mahomes' 20-yard touchdown pass to tight end Travis Kelce with 13:48 left in the half. After forcing the Browns to punt, Kansas City drove back for more points; this time Mahomes completed 5 of 7 passes for 40 yards and rushed for 13 yards, as he led the team to a 16–3 lead with Butker's 50-yard field goal. Cleveland responded with a drive to the Chiefs' 25-yard line. On the next play, Mayfield threw a pass to Rashard Higgins; as he dived for the goal line, safety Daniel Sorensen hit him from the left side, knocking the ball loose and causing it to roll through the end zone for a touchback. Many observers argued Sorensen should have been penalized for targeting Higgins with his helmet, including CBS rules analyst Gene Steratore. Kansas City took the ball back with 30 seconds left, and managed to drive into scoring range with Mahomes completing passes to Hill for gains of 13 and 16 yards, as well as a 22-yard pass to Kelce. On the last play of the quarter, Butker kicked a 28-yard field goal, giving the Chiefs a 19–3 halftime lead.

Early in the third quarter, Tyrann Mathieu intercepted a pass from Mayfield and returned it 17 yards to the Browns' 19-yard line. Kansas City only gained four yards with their next three plays and Butker missed a 33-yard field goal attempt. Cleveland took over on their own 23-yard line, and started off with a pair of runs from Nick Chubb for gains of 23 and 18 yards. Then after a 2-yard run from Kareem Hunt, Mayfield's 18-yard completion to Higgins gave the Browns a first down on the Chiefs' 16-yard line. Three plays later, Mayfield finished the drive with a 4-yard touchdown pass to Jarvis Landry, cutting the deficit to 19–10. Kansas City then drove to a 3rd and 1 on their 48-yard line. On the next play, Mahomes tried to run for a first down, but was tackled short of the marker and was knocked out of the game and put into concussion protocol. He was replaced by 13-year veteran Chad Henne, making his postseason debut. Now faced with 4th and 1, Henne pitched the ball to Darrel Williams, who ran around the left side for a 12-yard gain. On the next play, Williams rushed 16 yards to the Browns' 24-yard line. Cleveland's defense managed to stop the drive on their 15-yard line, where Butker's 33-yard field goal gave the Chiefs a 22–10 lead, with 4:24 left in the third quarter.

Cleveland took the ball back and mounted their longest drive of the season, moving the ball 75 yards in 18 plays on a possession that lasted 8:17 and included two fourth down conversions. On 4th and 1 from their own 34-yard line, Chubb ran 3 yards for a first down. Then on 4th and 3 from the Chiefs' 12-yard line, tight end Austin Hooper made a diving catch through tight coverage by Bashaud Breeland for a 5-yard gain. Two plays later, Hunt scored on a 3-yard touchdown run, making the score 22–17 with 11:07 left. Kansas City then drove to the Browns' 25-yard line. But after a penalty pushed them back to the 38-yard line, Henne threw a deep pass to the end zone that was intercepted by safety Karl Joseph. On Cleveland's next drive, they moved into a 3rd and 11 situation on their own 30-yard line. On the next play, Mayfield was forced to make a check-down pass to Hunt, who was tackled after picking up 2 yards. Now on 4th and 9, they punted the ball to Kansas City with 4:09 left. The Chiefs then converted a 3rd and 4 with Henne's 5-yard pass to Williams. Then after a Myles Garrett sack brought up 3rd and 14, Henne scrambled for a 13-yard gain, going down just inches short of a first down. Now faced with 4th and inches on their own 35-yard line, Chiefs coach Andy Reid decided to attempt a conversion. The Chiefs came out in shotgun formation with no running backs in the backfield, leading commentator Tony Romo to assume they would simply try to draw the Browns offsides. Instead, Henne took the snap and threw the ball to Hill for a 5-yard game-clinching first down.

Mahomes completed 21 of 30 passes for 255 yards and a touchdown, Hill caught 8 passes for 110 yards, while also rushing for 9 yards and Kelce had 8 receptions for 109 yards and a touchdown. Starting in place of the injured Clyde Edwards-Helaire, Williams rushed for 78 yards and caught 4 passes for 16 yards. Mayfield completed 23 of 37 passes for 204 yards with a touchdown and an interception.

==== NFC: Tampa Bay Buccaneers 30, New Orleans Saints 20 ====
Tampa Bay Buccaneers vs. New Orleans Saints – Game summary

Quarter	1	2	3	4	Total
Buccaneers	0	13	7	10	30
Saints	6	7	7	0	20

at Mercedes-Benz Superdome, New Orleans, Louisiana

- Date: January 17, 2021
- Game time: 5:40 p.m. CST
- Game weather: None (indoor stadium)
- Game attendance: 3,750 (Note: Attendance at the game was limited due to the COVID-19 pandemic in Louisiana.)
- Referee: Shawn Hochuli
- TV announcers (Fox): Joe Buck, Troy Aikman, Erin Andrews and Tom Rinaldi
- Recap, Game Book

Game information

First quarter

- NO – Wil Lutz 23-yard field goal, 11:30. Saints 3–0. Drive: 6 plays, 16 yards, 1:48.
- NO – Wil Lutz 42-yard field goal, 4:39. Saints 6–0. Drive: 12 plays, 46 yards, 5:07.

Second quarter

- TB – Ryan Succop 26-yard field goal, 12:57. Saints 6–3. Drive: 15 plays, 67 yards, 6:42.
- TB – Mike Evans 3-yard pass from Tom Brady (Ryan Succop kick), 11:16. Buccaneers 10–6. Drive: 1 play, 3 yards, 0:04.
- NO – Tre'Quan Smith 56-yard pass from Jameis Winston (Wil Lutz kick), 8:08. Saints 13–10. Drive: 6 plays, 75 yards, 3:08.
- TB – Ryan Succop 37-yard field goal, 0:00. Tied 13–13. Drive: 13 plays, 63 yards, 2:28.

Third quarter

- NO – Tre'Quan Smith 16-yard pass from Drew Brees (Wil Lutz kick), 9:43. Saints 20–13. Drive: 10 plays, 75 yards, 5:17.
- TB – Leonard Fournette 6-yard pass from Tom Brady (Ryan Succop kick), 2:22. Tied 20–20. Drive: 5 plays, 40 yards, 2:08.

Fourth quarter

- TB – Ryan Succop 36-yard field goal, 9:52. Buccaneers 23–20. Drive: 11 plays, 61 yards, 5:52.
- TB – Tom Brady 1-yard run (Ryan Succop kick), 4:57. Buccaneers 30–20. Drive: 4 plays, 20 yards, 2:11.

Top passers

- TB – Tom Brady – 18/33, 199 yards, 2 TD
- NO – Drew Brees – 19/34, 134 yards, TD, 3 INT

Top rushers

- TB – Leonard Fournette – 17 carries, 63 yards
- NO – Alvin Kamara – 18 carries, 85 yards

Top receivers

- TB – Cameron Brate – 4 receptions, 50 yards
- NO – Tre'Quan Smith – 3 receptions, 85 yards, 2 TD

Tampa Bay forced four turnovers which were converted into three touchdowns in a winning effort against a Saints team that had defeated them twice during the regular season. Buccaneers linebacker Devin White led the defensive effort with 10 tackles (1 for loss), 1 assist, a fumble recovery, and an interception.

The Buccaneers had to punt on their opening drive, and Deonte Harris' 43-yard return gave New Orleans a first down on the Tampa Bay 21-yard line, setting up Wil Lutz's 23-yard field goal to take a 3–0 lead. The next time Tampa Bay punted, Harris returned it for a touchdown, ultimately negated by an illegal block penalty. Still, the team managed to drive 36 yards to a 6–0 lead on Lutz's 42-yard kick. The Buccaneers responded by moving the ball 65 yards in 15 plays to score on Ryan Succop's 26-yard field goal, with 12:57 left in the half. On the Saints' next drive, Sean Murphy-Bunting intercepted a pass from Drew Brees and returned it 36 yards to the New Orleans 3-yard line, setting up Tom Brady's 3-yard touchdown pass to Mike Evans that gave Tampa Bay a 10–6 lead. New Orleans took the ball back and drove to their 44-yard line. On the next play, running back Alvin Kamara took a snap out of the wildcat formation and gave the ball to receiver Emmanuel Sanders, who then pitched the ball to backup quarterback Jameis Winston. Winston then threw the ball to Tre'Quan Smith for a 56-yard touchdown, putting the Saints back in the lead at 13–10. Following a punt from each team, the Buccaneers drove 68 yards to tie the score 13–13 with Succop's 37-yard field goal on the last play of the half.

New Orleans opened the third quarter with a 10-play, 75-yard drive, with Kamara rushing 4 times for 32 yards and catching a pass for 7 yards. Brees finished the possession with a 16-yard touchdown pass to Smith, giving the Saints a 20–13 lead. The Saints defense then forced a punt, but on their next drive, Antoine Winfield Jr. forced a fumble from Jared Cook that White recovered and returned 18 yards to the Saints' 40-yard line. Brady started the ensuing possession with a 19-yard pass to tight end Cameron Brate, and finished it with a 6-yard touchdown completion to running back Leonard Fournette, with the game now tied at 20–20. After a Saints punt, Brady's completions to Tyler Johnson and Scotty Miller for gains of 15 and 29 yards set up Succop's 36-yard field goal, giving Tampa Bay a 23–20 lead with 9:52 left. White put an end to New Orleans' next drive, intercepting Brees and returning the ball 28 yards to the Saints' 20-yard line. Three plays later, Brady scored on a 1-yard quarterback sneak that increased the Buccaneers' lead to 30–20 with 4:57 left. Brees was picked off for a third time, this time by safety Mike Edwards, ultimately securing Tampa Bay's victory.

Brady completed 18 of 33 passes for 199 yards and two touchdowns, and became the oldest player ever to score a postseason rushing touchdown, as he advanced to his 14th conference championship game in 21 seasons. In his final NFL game before retiring, Brees was held to completing 19 of 34 passes, for 134 yards and a touchdown, while being intercepted three times. Kamara was the top rusher of the game with 18 carries for 85 yards, while also catching 3 passes for 20 yards.

== Conference championships ==
As per an annual rotation used by the NFL since 1997 and made official in 2002, the NFC Championship Game was the first game played on January 24 at 3:05 p.m. EST, followed by the AFC Championship Game at 6:40 p.m. EST.

=== Sunday, January 24, 2021 ===
==== NFC: Tampa Bay Buccaneers 31, Green Bay Packers 26 ====
Tampa Bay Buccaneers vs. Green Bay Packers – Game Summary

Quarter	1	2	3	4	Total
Buccaneers	7	14	7	3	31
Packers	0	10	13	3	26

at Lambeau Field, Green Bay, Wisconsin

- Date: January 24, 2021
- Game time: 2:05 p.m. CST
- Game weather: Sunny, 29 °F (−2 °C)
- Game attendance: 7,772 (Note: Attendance at the game was limited to 9,000 due to the COVID-19 pandemic in Wisconsin.)
- Referee: Clete Blakeman
- TV announcers (Fox): Joe Buck, Troy Aikman, Erin Andrews and Tom Rinaldi
- Recap, Game Book

Game information

First quarter

- TB – Mike Evans 15-yard pass from Tom Brady (Ryan Succop kick), 10:59. Buccaneers 7–0. Drive: 9 plays, 66 yards, 4:01.

Second quarter

- GB – Marquez Valdes-Scantling 50-yard pass from Aaron Rodgers (Mason Crosby kick), 14:07. Tied 7–7. Drive: 7 plays, 90 yards, 3:42.
- TB – Leonard Fournette 20-yard run (Ryan Succop kick), 12:24. Buccaneers 14–7. Drive: 4 plays, 73 yards, 1:43.
- GB – Mason Crosby 24-yard field goal, 4:59. Buccaneers 14–10. Drive: 15 plays, 69 yards, 7:25.
- TB – Scotty Miller 39-yard pass from Tom Brady (Ryan Succop kick), 0:01. Buccaneers 21–10. Drive: 5 plays, 51 yards, 0:27.

Third quarter

- TB – Cameron Brate 8-yard pass from Tom Brady (Ryan Succop kick), 13:54. Buccaneers 28–10. Drive: 1 play, 8 yards, 0:04.
- GB – Robert Tonyan 8-yard pass from Aaron Rodgers (Mason Crosby kick), 9:28. Buccaneers 28–17. Drive: 8 plays, 75 yards, 4:26.
- GB – Davante Adams 2-yard pass from Aaron Rodgers (pass failed), 0:24. Buccaneers 28–23. Drive: 13 plays, 68 yards, 7:30.

Fourth quarter

- TB – Ryan Succop 46-yard field goal, 4:42. Buccaneers 31–23. Drive: 8 plays, 44 yards, 3:28.
- GB – Mason Crosby 26-yard field goal, 2:05. Buccaneers 31–26. Drive: 9 plays, 58 yards, 2:37.

Top passers

- TB – Tom Brady – 20/36, 280 yards, 3 TD, 3 INT
- GB – Aaron Rodgers – 33/48, 346 yards, 3 TD, INT

Top rushers

- TB – Leonard Fournette – 12 rushes, 55 yards, TD
- GB – Aaron Jones – 6 rushes, 27 yards

Top receivers

- TB – Chris Godwin – 5 receptions, 110 yards
- GB – Marquez Valdes-Scantling – 4 receptions, 115 yards, TD

Despite giving up more yards and having more turnovers than Green Bay, Tampa Bay's 18 point lead early in the second half helped them weather a comeback by Green Bay, as Tampa Bay's defense held Green Bay to just 6 points off of 3 interceptions.

Tampa Bay took the opening kickoff and drove 66 yards on a drive that featured three third down conversions. First, Tom Brady converted a 3rd and 4 with a 27-yard pass to Mike Evans. Then on 3rd and 9, he threw a 14-yard completion to Chris Godwin. Finally, Brady finished the possession with a 15-yard touchdown pass to Evans on 3rd and 7, giving the Buccaneers a 7–0 lead. Following a punt from each team, Green Bay tied the score at 7–7 on a 90-yard drive in which Aaron Rodgers converted a 3rd and 15 with a 23-yard pass to Allen Lazard before throwing a 50-yard touchdown completion to Marquez Valdes-Scantling. Tampa Bay took the ball back, and made another big 3rd down conversion with Brady's 52-yard pass to Godwin on 3rd and 9. On the next play, Leonard Fournette's 20-yard touchdown run made the score 14–7 with 12:24 left in the half. Green Bay responded by driving 69 yards in 15 plays to cut the score to 14–10 with Mason Crosby's 24-yard field goal. Their defense then forced a punt, but on the Packers' next drive, Sean Murphy-Bunting intercepted a pass from Rodgers on the Buccaneers' 49-yard line with 28 seconds left in the half. Tampa Bay then drove to a 4th and 4 on the Packers' 45-yard line, managing to convert it with a 6-yard catch by Fournette. With eight seconds remaining, Tampa Bay decided against kicking a long field goal, and Brady threw a 39-yard touchdown pass to Scotty Miller, ending the half with the Buccaneers ahead 21–10. In the first half alone, Brady completed 13 of 22 passes for 202 yards and two touchdowns.

Two plays into the third quarter, safety Jordan Whitehead forced a fumble from Packers running back Aaron Jones. Devin White recovered it for Tampa Bay and returned it 21 yards to the Green Bay 8-yard line. On the next play, Tampa Bay fooled the Packers defense with a play-action pass, with Brady faking a backfield handoff before throwing the ball to tight end Cameron Brate for a touchdown and a 28–10 lead. On Green Bay's next drive, Rodgers completed 5 of 6 passes for 68 yards and finishing the drive with an 8-yard touchdown throw to tight end Robert Tonyan, making the score 28–17. Then safety Adrian Amos intercepted a pass from Brady on the Packers' 32-yard line, sparking a 13-play, 68-yard drive that ended with Rodgers' 2-yard touchdown completion to Davante Adams with 24 seconds left in the quarter; receiver Equanimeous St. Brown dropped Rodgers' pass on a 2-point conversion attempt, and the score remained 28–23. Tampa Bay then drove to the Packers' 28-yard line, only to lose the ball again when Brady threw an interception to cornerback Jaire Alexander. Green Bay could not get a first down and had to punt after Shaquil Barrett sacked Rodgers for a 10-yard loss on 3rd and 5. Then Brady was picked off for the third time, throwing another interception to Alexander. Green Bay's next possession resulted in Rodgers again being sacked by Barrett and the team again going three-and-out. Tampa Bay took the ball back on their own 28-yard line, and went on to drive 44 yards in 8 plays, the longest a 29-yard gain on a screen pass from Brady to Rob Gronkowski. On the last play, Ryan Succop's 46-yard field goal gave the Buccaneers a 31–23 lead with 4:42 left.

Green Bay then drove to a first and goal from the Buccaneers' 8-yard line. After two incompletions, Rodgers appeared to have room to run toward the end zone, but he chose to throw the ball to a well covered Adams, which resulted in another incompletion. Packers head coach Matt LaFleur elected not to attempt a tying touchdown on 4th and goal from the 8-yard line with 2:09 left; Crosby kicked a field goal that cut the Packers' deficit to 5 points, 31–26. Tampa Bay went on to run out the rest of the clock with three first downs; they started the drive with a 9-yard pass from Brady to Evans as the clock ran down to the 2-minute warning. Green Bay deliberately committed an encroachment penalty, on 2nd and 1, giving the Buccaneers a first down. Two plays later on 3rd and 4, Brady's threw an incomplete pass, but the officials threw a late flag against defensive back Kevin King for pass interference while trying to cover Tyler Johnson, giving the Buccaneers another first down to clinch the game. The call was controversial since several Tampa Bay players seemed to commit holds earlier in the game that went uncalled, including one on Allen Lazard in the first quarter, although the call itself was deemed correct. Tampa Bay finished the game with a run by Godwin on third and 5.

Brady completed 20 of 36 passes for 280 yards with three touchdowns and three interceptions in his 14th conference championship game (and first in the NFC) as he advanced to his 10th Super Bowl in 21 seasons. Godwin was his top target with 5 receptions for 110 yards. White had 9 tackles, 6 assists, and a fumble recovery. Barrett had 3 sacks, while linebacker Jason Pierre-Paul had 2 sacks. Rodgers completed 33 of 48 passes for 346 yards and 3 touchdowns, with one interception, as he lost his second consecutive conference championship game and fell to 1–4 overall in Conference title games over his 16 seasons, making him the first quarterback to have four consecutive losses in conference championship games. Valdes-Scantling caught 4 passes for 115 yards and a score. Nose tackle Kenny Clark had 6 tackles (1 for loss), 2 assists, and a sack. With the win, the Buccaneers reached their second Super Bowl in franchise history and became the first team to play a Super Bowl in their home stadium.

On April 5, 2021, during Rodgers' first episode of Jeopardy! as the guest host following the death of its longtime emcee Alex Trebek, the questionable fourth-quarter play was referenced in a player's Final Jeopardy! answer: "Who wanted to kick that field goal?" As the audience laughed at this, Rodgers remarked: "That's a great question. It should be correct, but unfortunately in this game today it's incorrect." However, the contestant (who had started the episode as the returning champion) entered $0 as his wager, and eventually finished in second place.

This was the second postseason meeting between the Packers and Buccaneers. The Packers had defeated the Buccaneers in the 1997 Divisional Playoffs.

==== AFC: Kansas City Chiefs 38, Buffalo Bills 24 ====
Buffalo Bills vs. Kansas City Chiefs – Game Summary

Quarter	1	2	3	4	Total
Bills	9	3	3	9	24
Chiefs	0	21	10	7	38

at Arrowhead Stadium, Kansas City, Missouri

- Date: January 24, 2021
- Game time: 5:40 p.m. CST
- Game weather: Cloudy, 40 °F (4 °C)
- Game attendance: 16,993 (Note: Attendance at the game was limited to 17,000 due to the COVID-19 pandemic in Missouri.)
- Referee: Bill Vinovich
- TV announcers (CBS): Jim Nantz, Tony Romo, Tracy Wolfson, Evan Washburn and Jay Feely
- Recap, Game Book

Game information

First quarter

- BUF – Tyler Bass 51-yard field goal, 11:27. Bills 3–0. Drive: 10 plays, 42 yards, 3:33.
- BUF – Dawson Knox 3-yard pass from Josh Allen (kick failed), 6:14. Bills 9–0. Drive: 1 play, 3 yards, 0:05.

Second quarter

- KC – Mecole Hardman 3-yard pass from Patrick Mahomes (Harrison Butker kick), 14:16. Bills 9–7. Drive: 14 plays, 80 yards, 6:58.
- KC – Darrel Williams 6-yard run (Harrison Butker kick), 9:35. Chiefs 14–9. Drive: 5 plays, 82 yards, 2:51.
- KC – Clyde Edwards-Helaire 1-yard run (Harrison Butker kick), 4:12. Chiefs 21–9. Drive: 9 plays, 77 yards, 4:19.
- BUF – Tyler Bass 20-yard field goal, 0:11. Chiefs 21–12. Drive: 12 plays, 73 yards, 4:01.

Third quarter

- KC – Harrison Butker 45-yard field goal, 10:48. Chiefs 24–12. Drive: 10 plays, 48 yards, 4:12.
- BUF – Tyler Bass 27-yard field goal, 5:49. Chiefs 24–15. Drive: 10 plays, 67 yards, 4:59.
- KC – Travis Kelce 1-yard pass from Patrick Mahomes (Harrison Butker kick), 3:29. Chiefs 31–15. Drive: 4 plays, 75 yards, 2:20.

Fourth quarter

- KC – Travis Kelce 5-yard pass from Patrick Mahomes (Harrison Butker kick), 7:36. Chiefs 38–15. Drive: 11 plays, 58 yards, 5:35.
- BUF – Isaiah McKenzie 6-yard pass from Josh Allen (pass failed), 4:08. Chiefs 38–21. Drive: 10 plays, 75 yards, 3:28.
- BUF – Tyler Bass 51-yard field goal, 3:14. Chiefs 38–24. Drive: 5 plays, 16 yards, 0:54.

Top passers

- BUF – Josh Allen – 28/48, 287 yards, 2 TD, INT
- KC – Patrick Mahomes – 29/38, 325 yards, 3 TD

Top rushers

- BUF – Josh Allen – 7 rushes, 88 yards
- KC – Darrel Williams – 13 rushes, 52 yards, TD

Top receivers

- BUF – Cole Beasley – 7 receptions, 88 yards
- KC – Tyreek Hill – 9 receptions, 172 yards

Kansas City overcame an early 9–0 deficit with 38 points and 439 total yards as they advanced to their second consecutive Super Bowl.

Buffalo opened up the scoring with Tyler Bass' 51-yard field goal, at the end of a 10-play, 42-yard drive, and the Bills forced the Chiefs to go three-and-out. The Bills also had to punt on their next drive, but returner Mecole Hardman muffed the kick and Taiwan Jones recovered it for Buffalo on the Chiefs' 3-yard line. On the next play, Josh Allen threw a touchdown pass to tight end Dawson Knox, making the score 9–0 after Bass missed the extra point. Kansas City advanced 80 yards on their next drive in which Patrick Mahomes completed 10 passes, one of them a 9-yard completion to running back Darrel Williams on 4th and 1. With 14:20 left in the half, Mahomes' 3-yard touchdown completion to Hardman made the score 9–7. The next time Kansas City got the ball, Hardman's 50-yard gain on an end-around run pre-empted a 6-yard touchdown run by Williams, giving the Chiefs a 14–9 lead. Following another Bills punt, Mahomes completed passes to tight end Travis Kelce for gains of 11 and 17 yards, along with a 33-yard completion to Tyreek Hill. Clyde Edwards-Helaire finished the drive with a 1-yard touchdown run, increasing the team's lead to 21–9. Buffalo took the ball back and drove 73 yards to the Chiefs' 2-yard line, featuring a 20-yard reception by running back T. J. Yeldon. On 4th and goal with 14 seconds left, the Bills decided to settle for Bass' 20-yard field goal and a 21–12 halftime score.

Mahomes started the third quarter completing 7 of 8 passes for 50 yards on the way to a 45-yard Harrison Butker field goal, bringing the Chiefs' lead up to 24–12. The Bills responded with a drive to the Chiefs' 8-yard line, with Allen completing passes of 23 yards to Cole Beasley and 17 yards to John Brown. Faced with 4th and 3 on the Chiefs' 8-yard line, Buffalo once again elected to take a Bass field goal, making the score 24–15. On the next play from scrimmage, Mahomes threw a 71-yard completion to Hill on the Bills' 4-yard line, leading to his 1-yard touchdown pass to Kelce that put Kansas City up 31–15. Chiefs cornerback Rashad Fenton then intercepted a pass from Allen, returning it 30 yards to the Chiefs' 42-yard line with 13:20 left. Kansas City went on to drive 58 yards and score another touchdown with Mahomes' 5-yard pass to Kelce, increasing their lead to 38–15 with 7:36 remaining. On their next drive, Buffalo drove 63 yards in 10 plays, including a 27-yard completion from Allen to Stefon Diggs on 3rd and 13, to score on Allen's 6-yard touchdown pass to Isaiah McKenzie; a two-point conversion was unsuccessful, keeping the score at 38–21. Buffalo recovered the ensuing onside kick, and Allen's 34-yard completion to Diggs set up Bass' fourth field goal of the day on a 51-yard kick. Buffalo's second attempt at an onside kick was unsuccessful and the Chiefs ran out the rest of the clock.

Mahomes completed 29 of 38 passes for 325 yards and 3 touchdowns, Hill had 9 receptions for a franchise record 172 yards, and Kelce caught 13 passes for 118 yards and 2 touchdowns – the most receptions by a player in a Conference Championship game. Defensive end Frank Clark had two of Kansas City's four sacks in the game. Allen finished the day 28-for-48 for 287 yards with 2 touchdowns and an interception, and was the game's leading rusher with 7 carries for 88 yards.

This was the fourth postseason meeting between the Chiefs and Bills. The Bills had won two of the prior three meetings, including the 1993 AFC Championship Game.

== Super Bowl LV: Tampa Bay Buccaneers 31, Kansas City Chiefs 9 ==
Super Bowl LV – Kansas City Chiefs vs. Tampa Bay Buccaneers – Game summary

Quarter	1	2	3	4	Total
Chiefs	3	3	3	0	9
Buccaneers	7	14	10	0	31

at Raymond James Stadium, Tampa, Florida (Note: The game was originally scheduled to be played at SoFi Stadium in Inglewood, California.)

- Date: February 7, 2021
- Game time: 6:40 p.m. EST
- Game weather: Clear, 63 °F (17 °C)
- Game attendance: 24,835 (Note: Attendance at the game was limited to 25,000 due to the COVID-19 pandemic in Florida.)
- Referee: Carl Cheffers
- TV announcers (CBS): Jim Nantz, Tony Romo, Tracy Wolfson, Evan Washburn and Jay Feely
- Recap, Game Book

Game information

First quarter

- KC – Harrison Butker 49-yard field goal, 5:10. Chiefs 3–0. Drive: 8 plays, 31 yards, 3:23.
- TB – Rob Gronkowski 8-yard pass from Tom Brady (Ryan Succop kick), 0:37. Buccaneers 7–3. Drive: 8 plays, 75 yards, 4:33.

Second quarter

- TB – Rob Gronkowski 17-yard pass from Tom Brady (Ryan Succop kick), 6:05. Buccaneers 14–3. Drive: 6 plays, 38 yards, 2:58.
- KC – Harrison Butker 34-yard field goal, 1:01. Buccaneers 14–6. Drive: 10 plays, 61 yards, 5:04.
- TB – Antonio Brown 1-yard pass from Tom Brady (Ryan Succop kick), 0:06. Buccaneers 21–6. Drive: 5 plays, 71 yards, 0:55.

Third quarter

- KC – Harrison Butker 52-yard field goal, 11:26. Buccaneers 21–9. Drive: 7 plays, 47 yards, 3:34.
- TB – Leonard Fournette 27-yard run (Ryan Succop kick), 7:45. Buccaneers 28–9. Drive: 6 plays, 74 yards, 3:41.
- TB – Ryan Succop 52-yard field goal, 2:46. Buccaneers 31–9. Drive: 8 plays, 11 yards, 3:34.

Fourth quarter

- No scoring plays.

Top passers

- KC – Patrick Mahomes – 26/49, 270 yards, 2 INT
- TB – Tom Brady – 21/29, 201 yards, 3 TD

Top rushers

- KC – Clyde Edwards-Helaire – 9 rushes, 64 yards
- TB – Leonard Fournette – 16 rushes, 89 yards, TD

Top receivers

- KC – Travis Kelce – 10 receptions, 133 yards
- TB – Rob Gronkowski – 6 receptions, 67 yards, 2 TD

== Television coverage ==
All playoff games were televised nationally on network television.

CBS and NBC acquired the rights to the two new Wild Card Round games. The coverage of the rest of the Wild Card round essentially remained the same, with ESPN produced coverage of one Wild Card game and simulcasted it on ABC; and CBS, NBC, and Fox televised each of the other three remaining Wild Card games.

CBS aired an alternate broadcast for its new Wild Card game on sister network Nickelodeon, oriented toward a youth audience, called by Noah Eagle (son of CBS commentator Ian Eagle) and Nate Burleson, joined by All That cast members Gabrielle Nevaeh Green and Lex Lumpkin as a booth analyst and sideline reporter respectively. It featured explanations of rules (with Iain Armitage, in character as Sheldon Cooper from CBS sitcom Young Sheldon, making appearances to explain penalties), customized on-air graphics, and augmented reality effects — including Nickelodeon's signature green slime on touchdowns. The telecast received critical praise from fans on social media and sportscasters, including those working for competing networks, on introducing children who otherwise may have never watched a football game before watching a game for the first time.

ESPN also carried additional Megacast broadcasts for its Wild Card game, including the "Film Room" on ESPN2 featured extended analysis of plays, ESPN+ carrying "Between the Lines" (which included extended analysis from a sports betting perspective), and a "watch party" on Freeform (which featured appearances by entertainment and pop culture personalities, and a halftime performance by DJ Khaled from Miami). NBC additionally aired its Wild Card game on streaming service Peacock and in Spanish on Telemundo.

Fox had exclusive coverage of both NFC Divisional games and the NFC Championship Game. Coverage of the AFC Divisional games was split between CBS and NBC. CBS then had exclusive coverage of the AFC Championship Game and the Super Bowl.

NBC's Mike Tirico and CBS' Tony Romo worked remotely during the Wild Card round after failing to pass their respective network's COVID-19 protocols. Romo returned to the broadcast booth for the Divisional round.
