= 2018 Pro Bowl =

National Football League all-star game

NFC	AFC
23	24
Head coach: Sean Payton (New Orleans Saints)	Head coach: Mike Tomlin (Pittsburgh Steelers)
	1	2	3	4	Total
NFC	7	13	0	3	23
AFC	3	0	14	7	24
- Date: January 28, 2018
- Stadium: Camping World Stadium; Orlando, Florida
- Offensive MVP: Delanie Walker (Tennessee Titans)
- Defensive MVP: Von Miller (Denver Broncos)
- Referee: Walt Anderson
- Attendance: 51,019

Ceremonies
- National anthem: Jordan Fisher
- Coin toss: Derrick Brooks; Warrick Dunn; Jason Taylor; LaDainian Tomlinson
- Halftime show: Jordan Fisher

TV in the United States
- Network: ESPN; ABC
- Announcers: Sean McDonough, Matt Hasselbeck, Lisa Salters and Louis Riddick

Radio in the United States
- Network: Westwood One
- Announcers: Kevin Kugler (play-by-play); Steve Tasker (analyst); Laura Okmin (sideline reporter)

The 2018 Pro Bowl was the National Football League's all-star game for the 2017 season, which was played at Camping World Stadium in Orlando, Florida on January 28, 2018. For the first time since 2009, the game started during afternoon hours instead of primetime hours for U.S. Mainland viewers with a 3 p.m. ET start. It marked the second year the game was played in Orlando. It was televised nationally by ESPN and simulcasted on ABC. The roster was announced on December 19 on NFL Network. The AFC team won the game 24–23, the second straight year the Pro Bowl was won by the AFC.

== Background ==
=== Host selection process ===
Under a three-year deal that began in 2017, the Pro Bowl will once again be hosted by Camping World Stadium in Orlando.

=== Side events ===
The Pro Bowl Skills Challenge was held on January 25 at the Walt Disney World Resort and its ESPN Wide World of Sports Complex.

== Game format ==
=== Rule changes ===
The game format was the same as for 2017, highlighted by:

- Forty-four players were assigned to each team, up from 43 in 2016 (a regular game-day active roster has 46).
- The two-minute warning that was given in the first and third quarters (in addition to the second and fourth quarters) in previous years was eliminated, and the ball did not change hands after the first and third quarters.
- The coin toss determined which team was awarded possession first. There were no kickoffs; the ball was placed on the 25-yard line at the start of each half and after scoring plays.
- Defenses were now permitted to play cover two and press coverage. Prior to 2014, only man coverage was allowed, except for goal line situations.
- A 38-second/25-second play clock was used instead of the usual 40-second/25-second clock, and up from 35-second/25-second clock in 2016.
- Replay reviews will be allowed; previously there was replay in the Pro Bowl only when new equipment tests were being conducted.
- There are no intentional grounding rules.
- Only defensive ends and tackles may rush on passing plays, but those must be on the same side of the ball. The defense is not permitted to blitz.
- All blindside blocks and blocks below the waist are illegal.
- A tight end and running back must be in every formation.
- No more than two wide receivers on either side of the ball.
- Deep middle safety must be aligned inside the hash marks.
- Play is stopped the moment a defender wraps his arms around the ball carrier. (This rule only applies to the quarterback in the backfield during regular NFL play.)

== Summary ==
=== Box score ===
2018 Pro Bowl: American Football Conference vs National Football Conference

Quarter	1	2	3	4	Total
NFC	7	13	0	3	23
AFC	3	0	14	7	24

at Camping World Stadium in Orlando, Florida

- Date: January 28, 2018
- Game time: 3:00 p.m. ET
- Game weather: 78 °F (26 °C), Rain showers
- Game attendance: 51,019
- Referee: Walt Anderson
- TV announcers (ESPN): Sean McDonough, Matt Hasselbeck, Lisa Salters and Louis Riddick
- Recap, Game Book

Game information

First quarter

- NFC – Adam Thielen 8-yard pass from Drew Brees (Graham Gano kick), 7:50. NFC 7–0. Drive: 13 plays, 75 yards, 7:10.
- AFC – Chris Boswell 41-yard field goal, 0:43. NFC 7–3. Drive: 12 plays, 52 yards, 7:07.

Second quarter

- NFC – Graham Gano 43-yard field goal, 12:08. NFC 10–3. Drive: 4 plays, −4 yards, 1:56.
- NFC – Harrison Smith 79-yard interception return (Graham Gano kick), 7:18. NFC 17–3.
- NFC – Graham Gano 40-yard field goal, 0:00. NFC 20–3. Drive: 11 plays, 58 yards, 1:53.

Third quarter

- AFC – Delanie Walker 4-yard pass from Alex Smith (Chris Boswell kick), 11:20. NFC 20–10. Drive: 5 plays, 75 yards, 3:40.
- AFC – LeSean McCoy 2-yard run (Chris Boswell kick), 5:36. NFC 20–17. Drive: 5 plays, 53 yards, 3:07.

Fourth quarter

- NFC – Graham Gano 38-yard field goal, 14:09. NFC 23–17. Drive: 13 plays, 55 yards, 6:27.
- AFC – Delanie Walker 18-yard pass from Derek Carr (Chris Boswell kick), 1:31. AFC 24–23. Drive: 7 plays, 47 yards, 2:13.

Top passers

- NFC – Jared Goff – 10/18, 86 yards
- AFC – Alex Smith – 7/10, 131 yards, TD, INT

Top rushers

- NFC – Mark Ingram II – 5 rushes, 21 yards
- AFC – LeSean McCoy – 3 rushes, 7 yards, TD

Top receivers

- NFC – Kyle Rudolph – 7 receptions, 70 yards
- AFC – T. Y. Hilton – 4 receptions, 98 yards

== AFC rosters ==
The following players were selected to represent the AFC:

=== Offense ===
Position	Starter(s)	Reserve(s)	Alternate(s)
Quarterback	12 Tom Brady, New England^{[d]}	7 Ben Roethlisberger, Pittsburgh; 17 Philip Rivers, LA Chargers^{[b]}	11 Alex Smith, Kansas City^{[a]} 4 Derek Carr, Oakland^{[a]}
Running back	26 Le'Veon Bell, Pittsburgh	25 LeSean McCoy, Buffalo; 27 Kareem Hunt, Kansas City	
Fullback	46 James Develin, New England^{[d]}		45 Roosevelt Nix, Pittsburgh^{[a]}
Wide receiver	10 DeAndre Hopkins, Houston^{[b]} 84 Antonio Brown, Pittsburgh	13 Keenan Allen, LA Chargers; 18 A. J. Green, Cincinnati^{[b]}	13 T. Y. Hilton, Indianapolis^{[a]} 14 Jarvis Landry, Miami^{[a]}
Tight end	87 Travis Kelce, Kansas City^{[b]}	87 Rob Gronkowski, New England^{[d]}	82 Delanie Walker, Tennessee^{[a]} 84 Jack Doyle, Indianapolis^{[a]}
Offensive tackle	77 Taylor Lewan, Tennessee; 78 Alejandro Villanueva, Pittsburgh	72 Donald Penn, Oakland^{[b]}	76 Russell Okung, LA Chargers^{[a]}
Offensive guard	66 David DeCastro, Pittsburgh; 70 Kelechi Osemele, Oakland	64 Richie Incognito, Buffalo	
Center	53 Maurkice Pouncey, Pittsburgh	61 Rodney Hudson, Oakland	

=== Defense ===
Position	Starter(s)	Reserve(s)	Alternate(s)
Defensive end	93 Calais Campbell, Jacksonville^{[b]} 99 Joey Bosa, LA Chargers^{[b]}	52 Khalil Mack, Oakland^{[b]}	54 Melvin Ingram, LA Chargers^{[a]} 97 Cameron Heyward, Pittsburgh^{[a]} 91 Yannick Ngakoue, Jacksonville^{[a]}
Defensive tackle	97 Geno Atkins, Cincinnati; 99 Jurrell Casey, Tennessee	97 Malik Jackson, Jacksonville	
Outside linebacker	58 Von Miller, Denver; 90 Jadeveon Clowney, Houston^{[b]}	55 Terrell Suggs, Baltimore	50 Telvin Smith, Jacksonville^{[a]}
Inside linebacker	57 C.J. Mosley, Baltimore	50 Ryan Shazier, Pittsburgh^{[b]}	53 Joe Schobert, Cleveland^{[a]}
Cornerback	20 Jalen Ramsey, Jacksonville; 21 A. J. Bouye, Jacksonville	21 Aqib Talib, Denver; 26 Casey Hayward, LA Chargers	
Free safety	32 Eric Weddle, Baltimore	23 Micah Hyde, Buffalo^{[b]}	
Strong safety	20 Reshad Jones, Miami		31 Kevin Byard, Tennessee^{[a]}

=== Special teams ===
Position	Starter	Alternate(s)
Punter	6 Brett Kern, Tennessee	
Placekicker	9 Chris Boswell, Pittsburgh	
Return specialist	10 Tyreek Hill, Kansas City	
Special teamer	18 Matthew Slater, New England^{[d]}	41 Brynden Trawick, Tennessee^{[a]}
Long snapper	46 Clark Harris, Cincinnati	

== NFC rosters ==
The following players were selected to represent the NFC:

=== Offense ===
Position	Starter(s)	Reserve(s)	Alternate(s)
Quarterback	11 Carson Wentz, Philadelphia^{[b]}^{[d]}	3 Russell Wilson, Seattle; 9 Drew Brees, New Orleans	16 Jared Goff, LA Rams^{[a]}
Running back	30 Todd Gurley, LA Rams	22 Mark Ingram II, New Orleans; 41 Alvin Kamara, New Orleans	
Fullback	44 Kyle Juszczyk, San Francisco		
Wide receiver	11 Julio Jones, Atlanta^{[b]} 19 Adam Thielen, Minnesota	11 Larry Fitzgerald, Arizona^{[b]} 13 Michael Thomas, New Orleans	17 Davante Adams, Green Bay^{[a]} 89 Doug Baldwin, Seattle^{[a]}
Tight end	86 Zach Ertz, Philadelphia^{[d]}	88 Jimmy Graham, Seattle^{[b]}	82 Jason Witten, Dallas^{[a]} 82 Kyle Rudolph, Minnesota^{[a]}
Offensive tackle	71 Trent Williams, Washington^{[b]} 77 Tyron Smith, Dallas^{[b]}	65 Lane Johnson, Philadelphia^{[d]}	77 Andrew Whitworth, LA Rams^{[a]} 74 Joe Staley, San Francisco^{[a]} 76 Duane Brown, Seattle^{[a]}
Offensive guard	70 Zack Martin, Dallas^{[b]} 79 Brandon Brooks, Philadelphia^{[d]}	75 Brandon Scherff, Washington^{[b]}	70 Trai Turner, Carolina^{[a]} 76 T. J. Lang, Detroit^{[a]} 67 Larry Warford, New Orleans^{[a]}
Center	51 Alex Mack, Atlanta	72 Travis Frederick, Dallas	

=== Defense ===
Position	Starter(s)	Reserve(s)	Alternate(s)
Defensive end	90 DeMarcus Lawrence, Dallas; 97 Everson Griffen, Minnesota^{[b]}	94 Cameron Jordan, New Orleans	72 Michael Bennett, Seattle^{[a]}
Defensive tackle	91 Fletcher Cox, Philadelphia^{[d]} 99 Aaron Donald, LA Rams^{[b]}	93 Gerald McCoy, Tampa Bay	76 Mike Daniels, Green Bay^{[a]} 98 Linval Joseph, Minnesota^{[a]}
Outside linebacker	55 Chandler Jones, Arizona; 91 Ryan Kerrigan, Washington	55 Anthony Barr, Minnesota^{[b]}	58 Thomas Davis Sr., Carolina^{[a]}
Inside linebacker	59 Luke Kuechly, Carolina^{[b]}	54 Bobby Wagner, Seattle^{[b]}	45 Deion Jones, Atlanta^{[a]} 58 Kwon Alexander, Tampa Bay^{[a]}
Cornerback	21 Patrick Peterson, Arizona; 29 Xavier Rhodes, Minnesota	23 Marshon Lattimore, New Orleans; 23 Darius Slay, Detroit	
Free safety	29 Earl Thomas, Seattle	27 Malcolm Jenkins, Philadelphia^{[d]}	
Strong safety	21 Landon Collins, NY Giants^{[b]}		22 Keanu Neal, Atlanta^{[a]} 22 Harrison Smith, Minnesota^{[a]}

=== Special teams ===
Position	Starter	Alternate(s)
Punter	6 Johnny Hekker, LA Rams	
Placekicker	4 Greg Zuerlein, LA Rams^{[b]}	9 Graham Gano, Carolina^{[a]}
Return specialist	10 Pharoh Cooper, LA Rams	
Special teamer	36 Budda Baker, Arizona	
Long snapper	44 Jake McQuaide, LA Rams	

Notes: Players must have accepted their invitations as alternates to be listed; those who declined are not considered Pro Bowlers.

bold player who participated in game
(C) signifies the player has been selected as a captain
^{a} Replacement Player selection due to injury or vacancy
^{b} Injured/suspended player; selected but did not participate
^{c} Replacement starter; selected as reserve
^{d} Selected but did not play because his team advanced to Super Bowl LII (see Pro Bowl "Player Selection" section)

== Number of selections per team ==
American Football Conference
Team	Selections
Pittsburgh Steelers	10
Jacksonville Jaguars	6
Los Angeles Chargers	6
Tennessee Titans	6
Oakland Raiders	5
New England Patriots	4
Kansas City Chiefs	4
Baltimore Ravens	3
Buffalo Bills	3
Cincinnati Bengals	3
Denver Broncos	2
Houston Texans	2
Indianapolis Colts	2
Miami Dolphins	2
Cleveland Browns	1
New York Jets	0

National Football Conference
Team	Selections
Los Angeles Rams	8
Seattle Seahawks	7
Minnesota Vikings	7
New Orleans Saints	7
Philadelphia Eagles	6
Dallas Cowboys	5
Arizona Cardinals	4
Carolina Panthers	4
Atlanta Falcons	4
Washington Redskins	3
Green Bay Packers	2
Detroit Lions	2
San Francisco 49ers	2
Tampa Bay Buccaneers	2
New York Giants	1
Chicago Bears	0

== Broadcasting ==
The 2018 Pro Bowl was televised nationally by ABC, ESPN, and ESPN Deportes. The simulcast marked the game's return to broadcast television since 2014, as well as its return to ABC for the first time since 2003. To accommodate the return to broadcast television, the game moved from primetime to an afternoon start time to avoid interfering with ABC's Primetime Lineup.

== Cheerleaders ==
All selected in a different way, some by fan vote, some by team vote and some by choice of their director, the 2018 Pro Bowl Cheerleaders were a team composed of only one representative from each NFL team. This elite group of women attended events, performed for fans, and learned new routines all throughout the week leading up to the game. The team performed for the entirety of the game and in the half-time routine with Jordan Fisher.

Team	Cheerleader
Arizona Cardinals	Nikki
Atlanta Falcons	Leslie
Baltimore Ravens	Amanda
Carolina Panthers	Chandalae
Cincinnati Bengals	Kristen
Dallas Cowboys	KaShara
Denver Broncos	Angela
Detroit Lions	Stacey
Houston Texans	Lauren
Indianapolis Colts	Jessica
Jacksonville Jaguars	Ginger
Kansas City Chiefs	Ashley
Los Angeles Chargers	Lauryn
Los Angeles Rams	Sativa-Skye
Miami Dolphins	Allison
Minnesota Vikings	Saral
New England Patriots	Victoria
New Orleans Saints	Marshe'
New York Jets	Kimberly
Oakland Raiders	Angel
Philadelphia Eagles	Symone
Seattle Seahawks	Hailey
San Francisco 49ers	Nina
Tampa Bay Buccaneers	Chloe
Tennessee Titans	Jocelyn
Washington Redskins	Kellie
