= San Francisco Gold Rush =

San Francisco Gold Rush may refer to:

- San Francisco 49ers Gold Rush, a cheerleading squad
- California gold rush, 1848–1855
