= NFL cheerleading =

American football league cheerleading

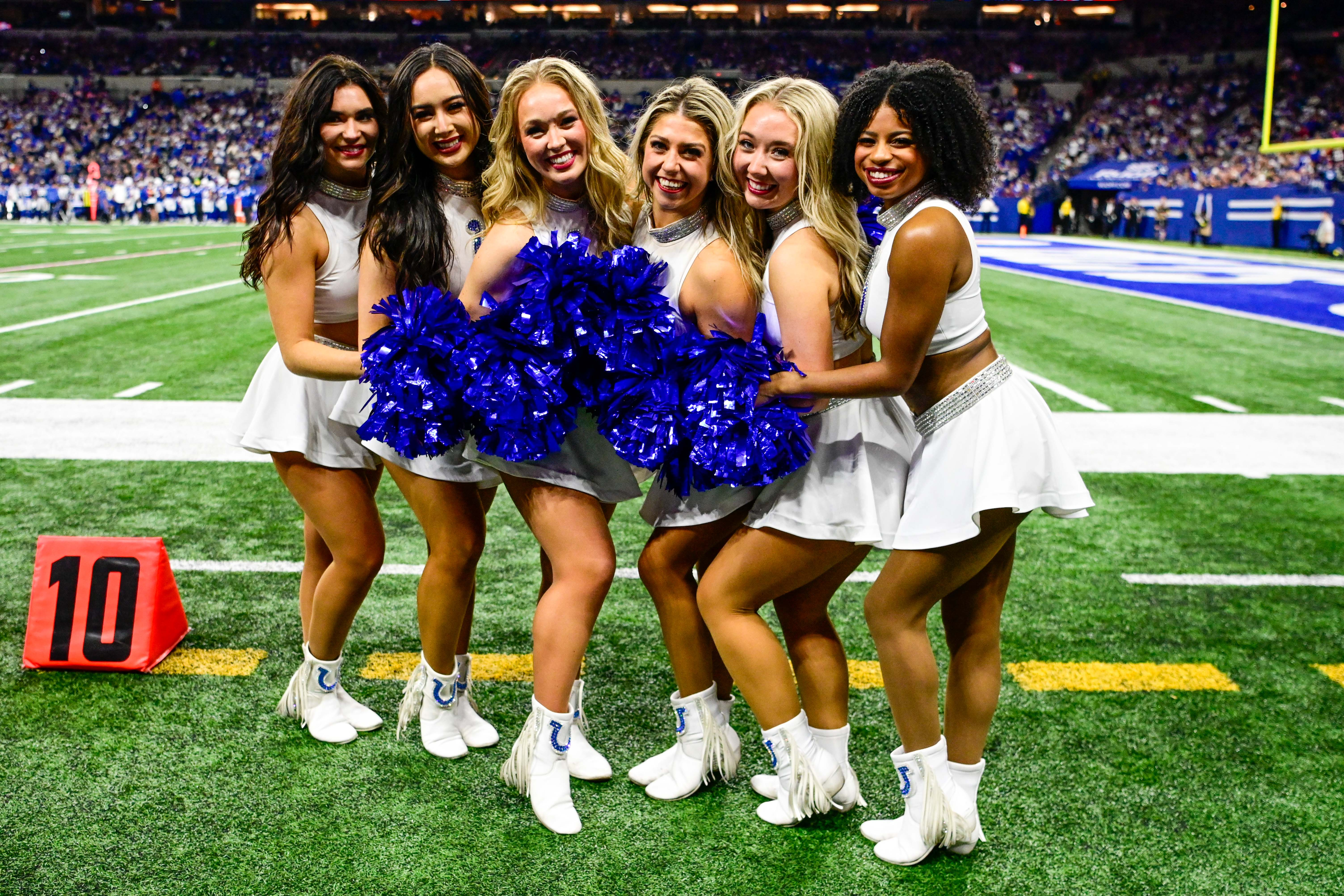
The Indianapolis Colts were the first NFL team to have cheerleaders when they were known as the Baltimore Colts.

Twenty-five of the thirty-two National Football League (NFL) teams have cheerleading squads who perform on the sideline during games. (Note: This figure includes the Green Bay Packers, who are represented by cheerleaders from the University of Wisconsin–Green Bay and St. Norbert College and do not have an official cheerleading squad.) In 1954, the Baltimore Colts became the first NFL team to have cheerleaders. Apart from the New York Giants, every current NFL franchise has had cheerleaders at some point in its history.

Cheerleading in the NFL is a part-time job. In addition to their main duties of cheering during football games, cheerleaders may have other responsibilities related to marketing the team for which they cheer, such as paid appearances, photoshoots, and charity events.

As well as being a mainstay of American football culture, cheerleaders are one of the biggest entertainment groups to regularly perform for the United States Armed Forces overseas with performances and tours being enlisted by the United Service Organizations (USO). Teams send their variety show, an elite group of their best members, to perform combination shows of dance, music, baton twirling, acrobatics, gymnastics, and more. In 1996, the San Francisco 49ers Cheerleaders and their director helicoptered into Bosnia and Herzegovina during the Bosnian War with the USO and the U.S. Army. In February 2007, the Buffalo Bills sent a squad of eight along with their choreographer into the warzone of Iraq. The U.S. troops in Korea have been entertained during the holiday season with the USO's Bob Hope Tour. Over the years, the tour has featured NFL cheerleaders from the Dallas Cowboys, San Francisco 49ers, and Washington Commanders.

In addition to USO tours, Armed Forces Entertainment (A.F.E) was established in 1951 and sent off their first ProBlitz Tour in 2019. These ProBlitz Tours include Super Bowl celebrations, kids' cheer clinics, and meet & greet opportunities at military bases around the world. The 2026 ProBlitz Tours included traveling to bases in Diego Garcia, Japan, Guam, Korea, Puerto Rico, Honduras, and many more.

== Teams with cheerleaders ==
NFL team	Current Squad Name	Years active	Former Squad Names
Arizona Cardinals	Arizona Cardinals Cheerleaders	1994–present	St. Louis Cardinals Cheerleaders (1964–1987); Phoenix Cardinals Cheerleaders (1988–1993)
Atlanta Falcons	Atlanta Falcons Cheerleaders	1976–present	Falconettes (1969–1976)
Baltimore Ravens	Baltimore Ravens Cheerleaders	1998–present	None
Carolina Panthers	Carolina Topcats	1995–present	None
Cincinnati Bengals	Cincinnati Ben-Gals	1976–present	None
Dallas Cowboys	Dallas Cowboys Cheerleaders	1972–present	CowBelles and Beaux (1961–1971)
Denver Broncos	Denver Broncos Cheerleaders	1993–present	Bronco Belles (1971-1976); Pony Express (1977–1985)
Detroit Lions	Detroit Lions Cheerleaders	1963–1974; 2016-present	None
Green Bay Packers	University of Wisconsin–Green Bay cheerleaders St. Norbert College cheerleaders (Note: The squads only perform at home games.)	1987–present (UWGB); 2007–present (SNC)	Packerettes (1957–1961); Golden Girls (1961–1972); Packerettes (1973–1977); Sideliners (1977–1986)
Houston Texans	Houston Texans Cheerleaders	2002–present	None
Indianapolis Colts	Indianapolis Colts Cheerleaders	1984–present	Baltimore Colts Cheerleaders (1954–1983)
Jacksonville Jaguars	Jacksonville Roar	1995–present	None
Kansas City Chiefs	Kansas City Chiefs Cheerleaders	1986–present	Chiefs Cheerleaders (1964); Chiefettes (1971–1985)
Las Vegas Raiders	Las Vegas Raiderettes	1961–present	Oakland Raiderettes (1961–1982, 1995–2019) Los Angeles Raiderettes (1982–1995)
Los Angeles Rams	Los Angeles Rams Cheerleaders	2016–present	Embraceable Ewes (1974–1994); St. Louis Rams Cheerleaders (1995–2015)
Miami Dolphins	Miami Dolphins Cheerleaders	1984–present	Dolphin Dolls (1966–1977); Dolphins Starbrites (1978–1983)
Minnesota Vikings	Minnesota Vikings Cheerleaders	1984–present	Vi-Queens (1961–1963); The Parkettes (St. Louis Park High School cheerleaders) (1964–1965, 1967–1983); Edina High School and Roosevelt High School cheerleaders (1966)
New England Patriots	New England Patriots Cheerleaders	1977–present	None
New Orleans Saints	New Orleans Saints Cheer Krewe	2021–present	Louisiannes/Saints Dancers (1967); Mademoiselles (1968); Mam’selles (1971); Bonnies Amies (1975–78); Angels (1978); Saintsations (1987–2021)
Philadelphia Eagles	Philadelphia Eagles Cheerleaders	1986–present	Eaglettes (1948–1970s); Liberty Belles (1970s)
San Francisco 49ers	San Francisco 49ers Gold Rush	1979–present	None
Seattle Seahawks	Seahawks Dancers	2019–present	Sea Gals (1976–2019)
Tampa Bay Buccaneers	Tampa Bay Buccaneers Cheerleaders	1999–present	SwashBucklers (1976–1998)
Tennessee Titans	Tennessee Titans Cheerleaders	1998–present	The Derrick Dolls (Houston/Tennessee Oilers) (1975–1997)
Washington Commanders	Command Force	2022–present	Redskinettes (1962–1997); Washington Redskins Cheerleaders "First Ladies of Football" (1998–2020); Washington Entertainment Team (Washington Football Team) (2021)

== Teams without cheerleaders ==
NFL team	Former Squad Names
Buffalo Bills	Buffalo Bills Cheerleaders (1960–1965); Buffalo Jills (1966–2013)
Chicago Bears	Chicago Honey Bears (1976–1985)
Cleveland Browns	Cleveland Browns Cheerleaders (1960s, 1971)
Los Angeles Chargers	Chargettes (1960s–70s); San Diego Charger Girls (1990–2016); Los Angeles Charger Girls (2017–2021)
New York Giants	None (never had cheerleaders)
New York Jets	Jet Set Rockettes (1966–1969); Jets Flag Crew (2006); Jets Flight Crew (2007–2022)
Pittsburgh Steelers	Pittsburgh Steelerettes (1960–1969)

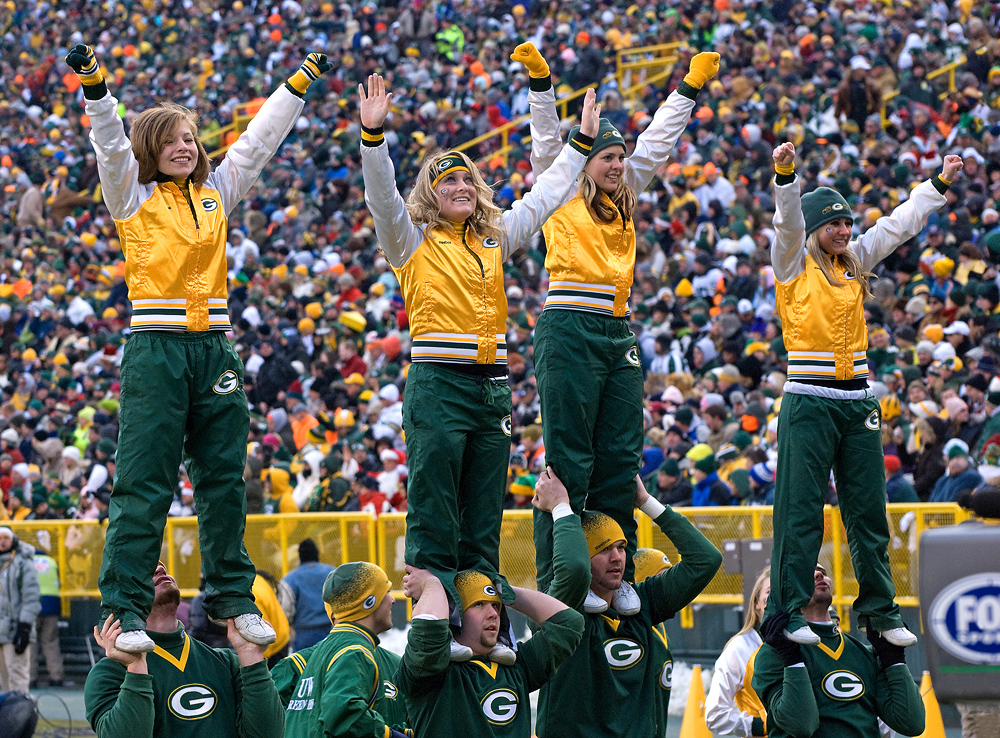
The Packers collegiate squad in 2009

As of 2025, seven teams do not have cheerleading squads: the Buffalo Bills, Chicago Bears, Cleveland Browns, Los Angeles Chargers, New York Giants, New York Jets, and Pittsburgh Steelers. The Giants are the only existing NFL franchise that has never had cheerleaders.

The Buffalo Bills endorsed the officially independent Buffalo Jills from 1966 to 2013; when several cheerleaders sued both the Bills and the Jills organizations, the Jills suspended operations.

Because the Packers' cheerleading squads only perform at home games, Super Bowl XLV between the Steelers and the Packers was the first Super Bowl to not feature cheerleaders.

Teams of "unofficial" cheerleaders began emerging in 2010 for NFL teams that did not have their own dance squad. These unofficial cheerleaders are not sanctioned by the NFL or any franchise in the NFL and therefore are not allowed to perform at games, represent the football team at any outside functions, or use any of the team's branding or trademarked colors on their uniforms. The teams are sponsored by local businesses, and the cheerleaders perform prior to the game, at tailgate parties, and at other local events. Some also attend the local NFL games in uniform, and sit together in their block of season ticket seats. Their audition process, costuming, and choreography are very similar to official NFL cheer teams. Some also produce an annual swimsuit calendar, just like the official cheerleaders. All of the independent teams hope at some point to be embraced by the NFL as "official" cheerleaders of their local teams.

- The Detroit Pride Cheerleaders were the first independent professional team, put together in August 2010 to support the Lions. However, as the squad was not officially recognized by the Lions, it could not use the Lions' logos or colors. In 2016, the Lions started an official cheerleading squad.
- The Gotham City Cheerleaders were organized in August 2011 to support all New York sports but are most closely associated with the Giants. The team has also been known as the New York Unofficials, the Unofficial Dancers of the New York Giants, and the Gotham's Team Blue Army Dancers.
- The Cleveland Spirit Cheerleaders were created in September 2012 to support the Browns as a test team to attract fan interest. This cheer team was created by the same people responsible for the Detroit Pride.

== Male and transgender cheerleaders ==
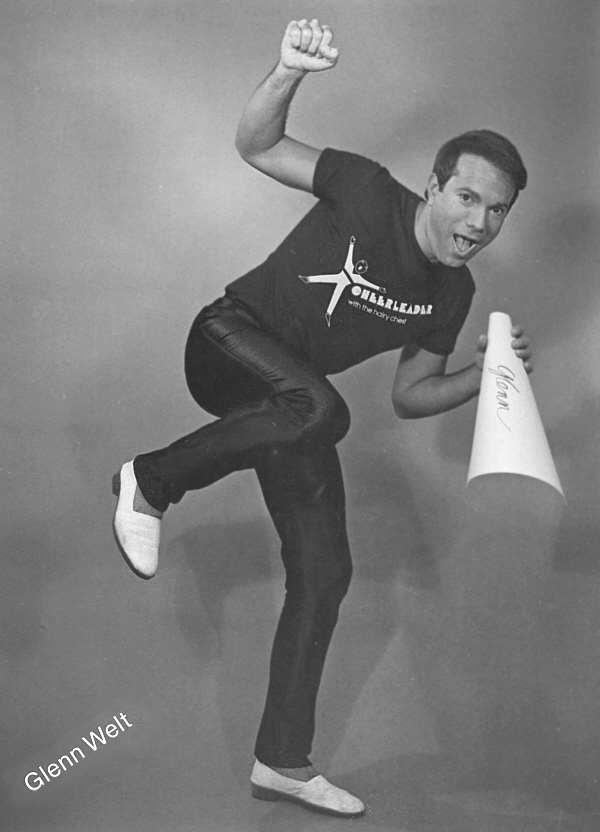
Glenn Welt, cheerleader PR & tour photo 1978–1980.

Glenn Welt was the first male to try out as an NFL cheerleader, doing so on May 20, 1978. The Miami Dolphins would not let him compete when he arrived at the Orange Bowl in Miami. The incident later became a nationwide news story, led to a federal anti-discrimination case, and was spoofed on a November 1979 episode of Mork & Mindy. The episode caused plans for a CBS made-for-TV movie starring Robin Williams as Welt to be scrapped, while also misrepresenting Welt and male cheerleaders in general when Williams pranced onto a football field dressed in a female outfit.

Male NFL cheerleaders as dancers for the past few decades have been rare due to social norms and marketability. However, in 1998 the Baltimore Ravens Cheerleaders were the first squad to start using male stuntmen.

Following trends in dance with popular summer dance series such as the Strictly Come Dancing franchise, So You Think You Can Dance, and World of Dance, where competitions are co-ed, in 2009, the first male dancers were added to the National Football League by the Dallas Cowboys. The Cowboys introduced the Rhythm & Blue Dancers, founded by Charlotte Jones and directed by Jenny Durbin Smith, becoming the first co-ed dance team in NFL history. They perform at every home game on stage, at halftime, and on the sidelines, with their dynamic hip-hop dancing, stunting, freestyle, and tumbling. They are also responsible for the first NFL drum corps and in 2017 created a 7–16 year old co-ed hip-hop dance team called the Dallas Cowboys Rookie Squad. In 2018, the Los Angeles Rams and New Orleans Saints adopted male dancers to their dance teams as well.

In 2019, the Seattle Seahawks, New England Patriots, Tennessee Titans, Indianapolis Colts, Tampa Bay Buccaneers and Philadelphia Eagles added males to their squads, and the Seahawks cheerleaders became the second permanent co-ed squad after the Ravens. In 2021, for the first time, the Panthers TopCats had multiple (three) men make the final team, with the Kansas City Chiefs Cheerleaders also adding a man to their team. Most of the squads' male cheerleaders are involved in stunts.

In March 2022, Justine Lindsay, a transgender woman, made the Carolina Topcats, becoming the first openly transgender person to cheer in the NFL.

In August 2025, during the 2025 preseason, the Vikings introduced two male cheerleaders, which led to national backlash on social media. The Vikings defended the two in an official statement, saying, "[M]ale cheerleaders have been a part of previous Vikings teams and have long been associated with collegiate and professional cheerleading."

== Cheerleader competitions ==
The first "Battle of the NFL Cheerleaders" was held in 1979 in Hollywood, Florida. Two cheerleaders from each cheerleading team compete against other mini-teams in various athletic events. The events include kayaking, swimming 100-yard dash, obstacle courses, and jet skiing. The Minnesota Vikings Cheerleaders took home the title in 1979.

In 1980, it was held in Atlantic City, New Jersey, and the Washington Redskinettes were the champions. The winners were Shiona Baum and Jeannie Fritz, and each received a car as the grand prize.

The competition was resurrected in 2006 by the NFL Network and was called the NFL Cheerleader Playoffs. The playoffs were taped between July 17 and July 21, 2006, at Six Flags New England in Agawam, Massachusetts. Two-person teams of cheerleaders from 25 of the NFL's 32 teams participated in a four-event series of competitions. The first two events tested the cheerleaders' athletic abilities in events like the 100-yard dash, kayaking, tandem cycling, and the obstacle course. The third event was a trivia challenge called "Know Your NFL." The final competition was a one-minute dance routine, similar to what they normally perform on NFL sidelines. The San Diego Chargers team (Casie and Shantel) defeated the Atlanta Falcons and St. Louis Rams squads to win the overall championship. The three teams finished in a three-way tie, with 210 points. The Chargers were declared the winners based on winning the dance competition.

== Criticism and controversies ==
There have been criticisms that NFL cheerleading is sexist, is objectifying women, exploitative, and outdated.

In addition, several cheerleaders have sued their respective teams for violating minimum wage laws, mistreatment from management, exploitative rules and behaviors, sexual harassment, and groping. Such injustices regarding the pay and employment treatment of NFL cheerleaders were highlighted in the 2019 documentary film A Woman's Work: The NFL's Cheerleader Problem. Dallas Cowboys brand officer Charlotte Jones Anderson has acknowledged that the cheerleaders' pay was low but suggested that being part of the cheerleaders was “about being a part of something bigger than themselves. . . . They have a chance to feel like they’re valued, that they’re special, and that they are making a difference.”

However, defenders and proponents of NFL cheerleading have stated it helps young women engage with the NFL at the most visible and prominent level, provides the NFL with role models for its female fans, and are a cost-effective way of promoting a team at events. Also, NFL cheerleading squads have been used as advocates for their teams for female empowerment or LGBT rights.

NFL spokesperson David Tossell in 2013 defended NFL cheerleading by stating, "Cheerleading has a long tradition in the majority of American sports at both professional and amateur levels; cheerleaders are part of American football culture from youth leagues to the NFL and are part of the game day experience for our fans."

Male NFL cheerleaders have increased in the 2010s to help offset changing societal attitudes and concerns that NFL cheerleading was sexist.

== Pro Bowl ==
A top honor for an NFL cheerleader is to be selected as a Pro Bowl cheerleader, with one from each team attending. The Pro Bowl Cheerleaders were founded in 1992 and directed by Jay Howarth and Angela King-Twitero. Each year, one squad member from every NFL team is chosen to participate in the collective Pro Bowl cheerleading squad. They are picked by either their own squads or by the fans via internet polling.

== Notable NFL cheerleaders ==
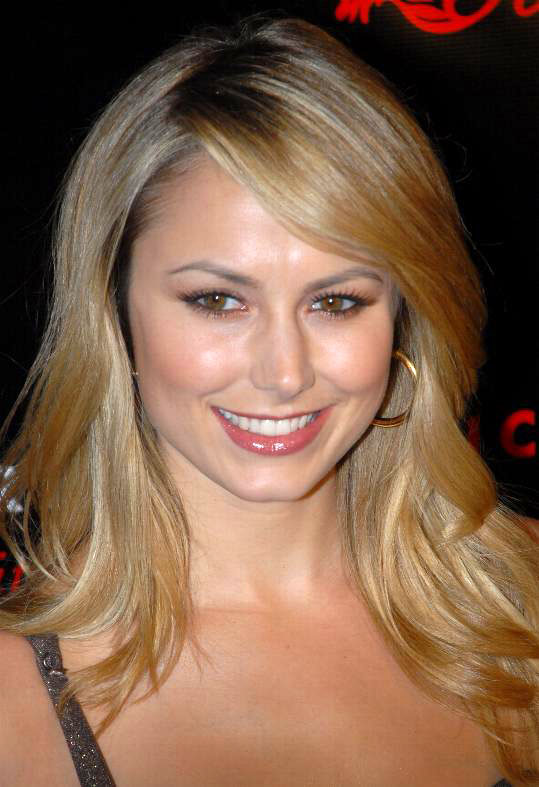
Actress Stacy Keibler, Baltimore Ravens

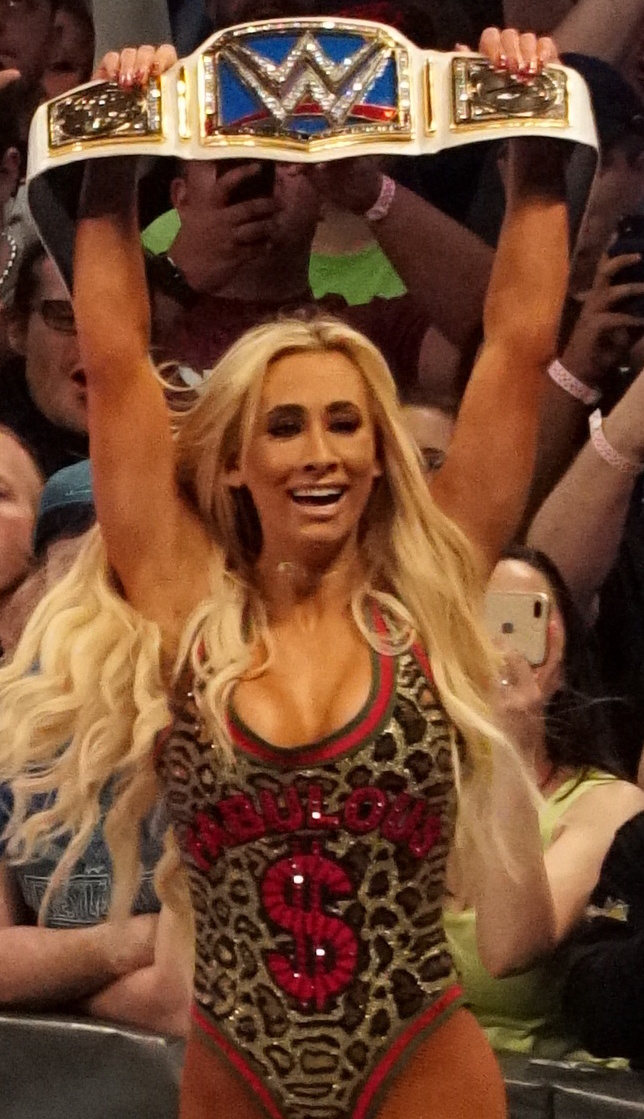
WWE wrestler Carmella, New England Patriots

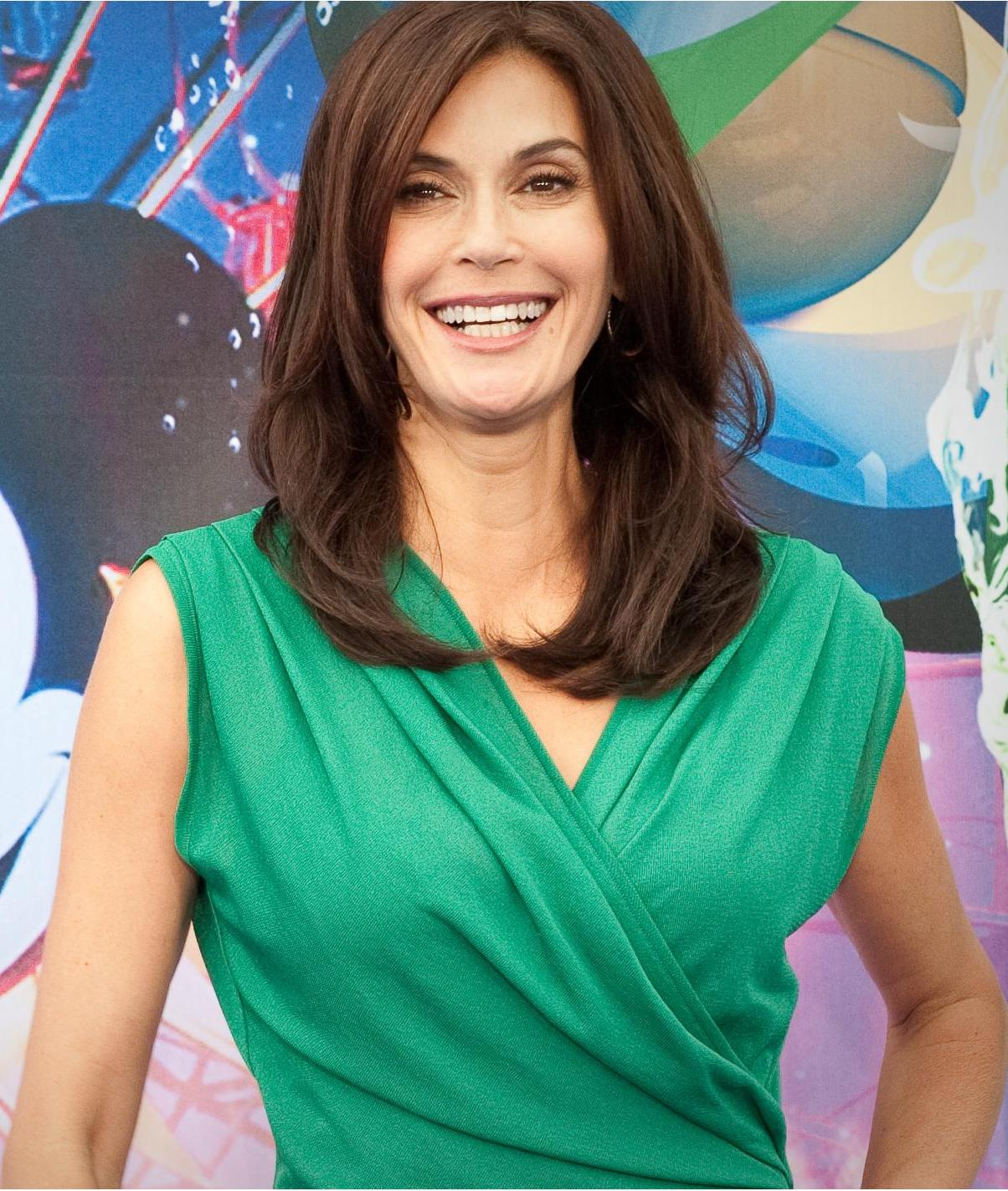
Actress Teri Hatcher, San Francisco 49ers

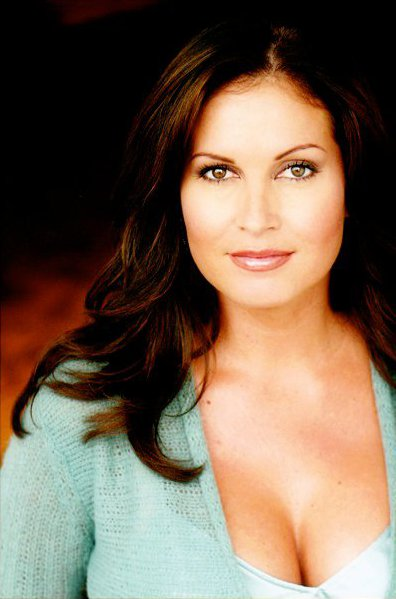
Journalist Lisa Guerrero, Los Angeles Rams

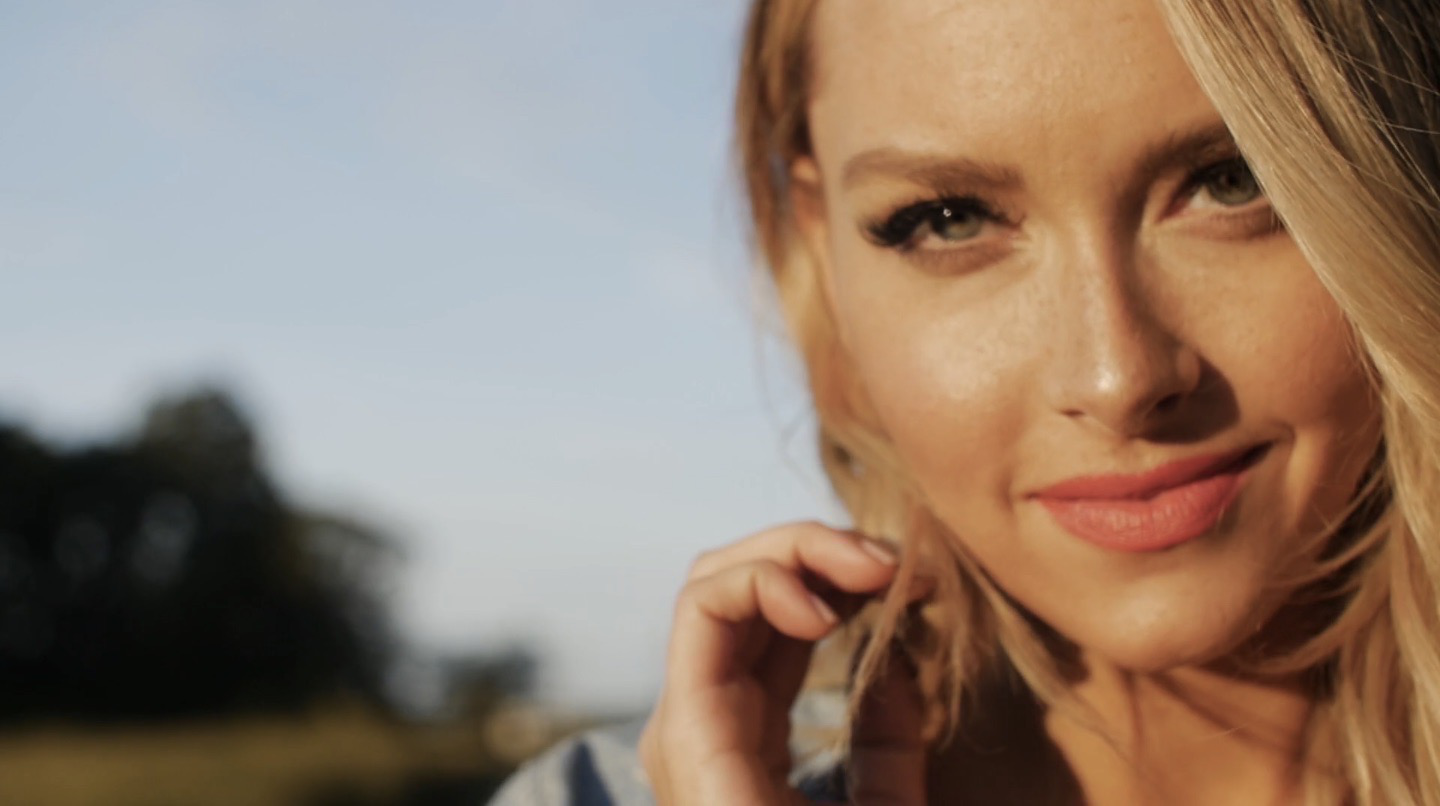
Model Camille Kostek, New England Patriots

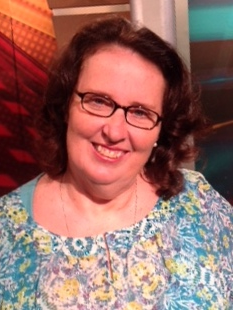
Actress Phyllis Smith,
St. Louis Cardinals

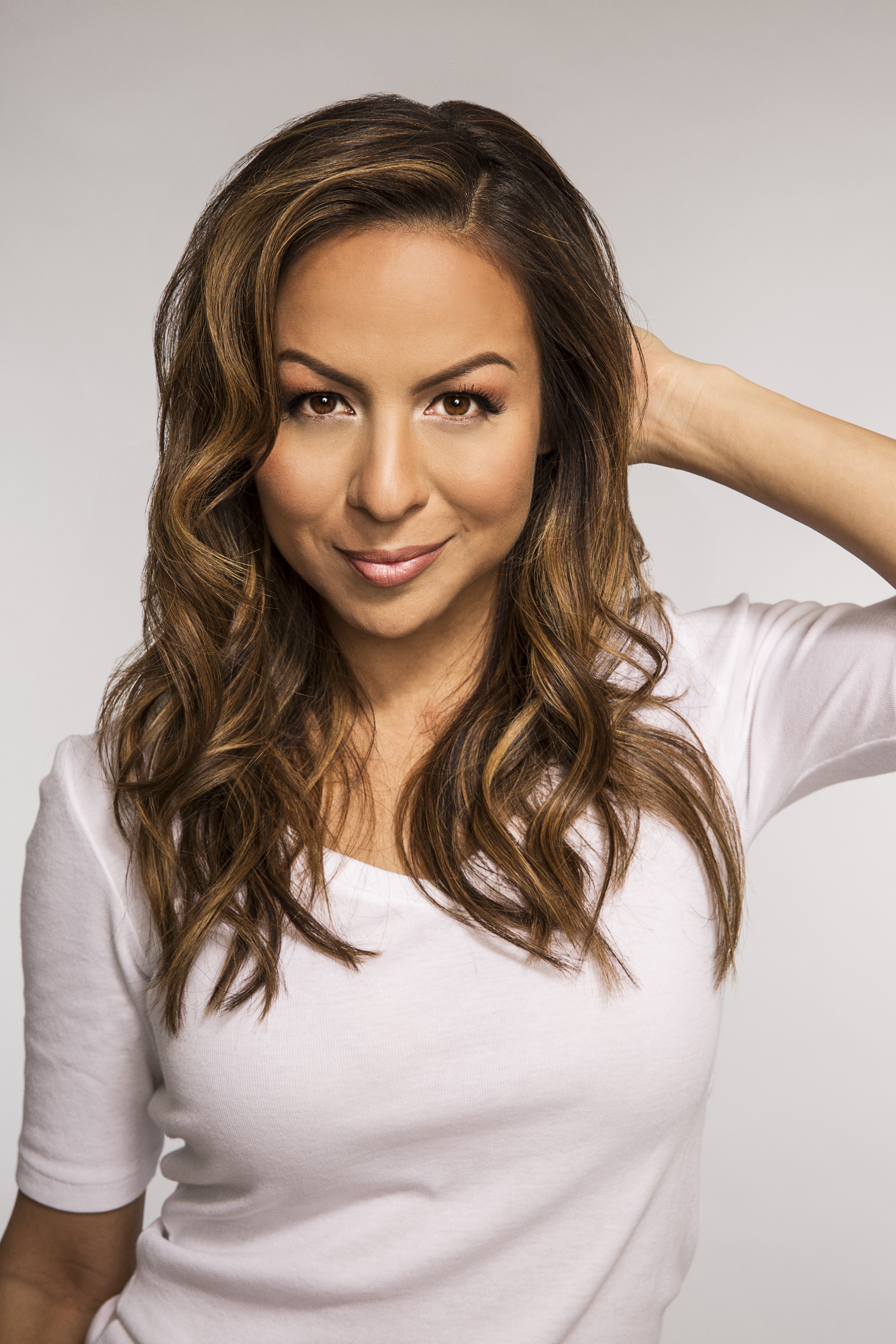
Comedian Anjelah Johnson, Oakland Raiders

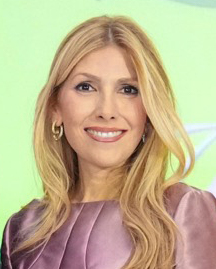
Political figure Jeanette Dousdebes Rubio, Miami Dolphins

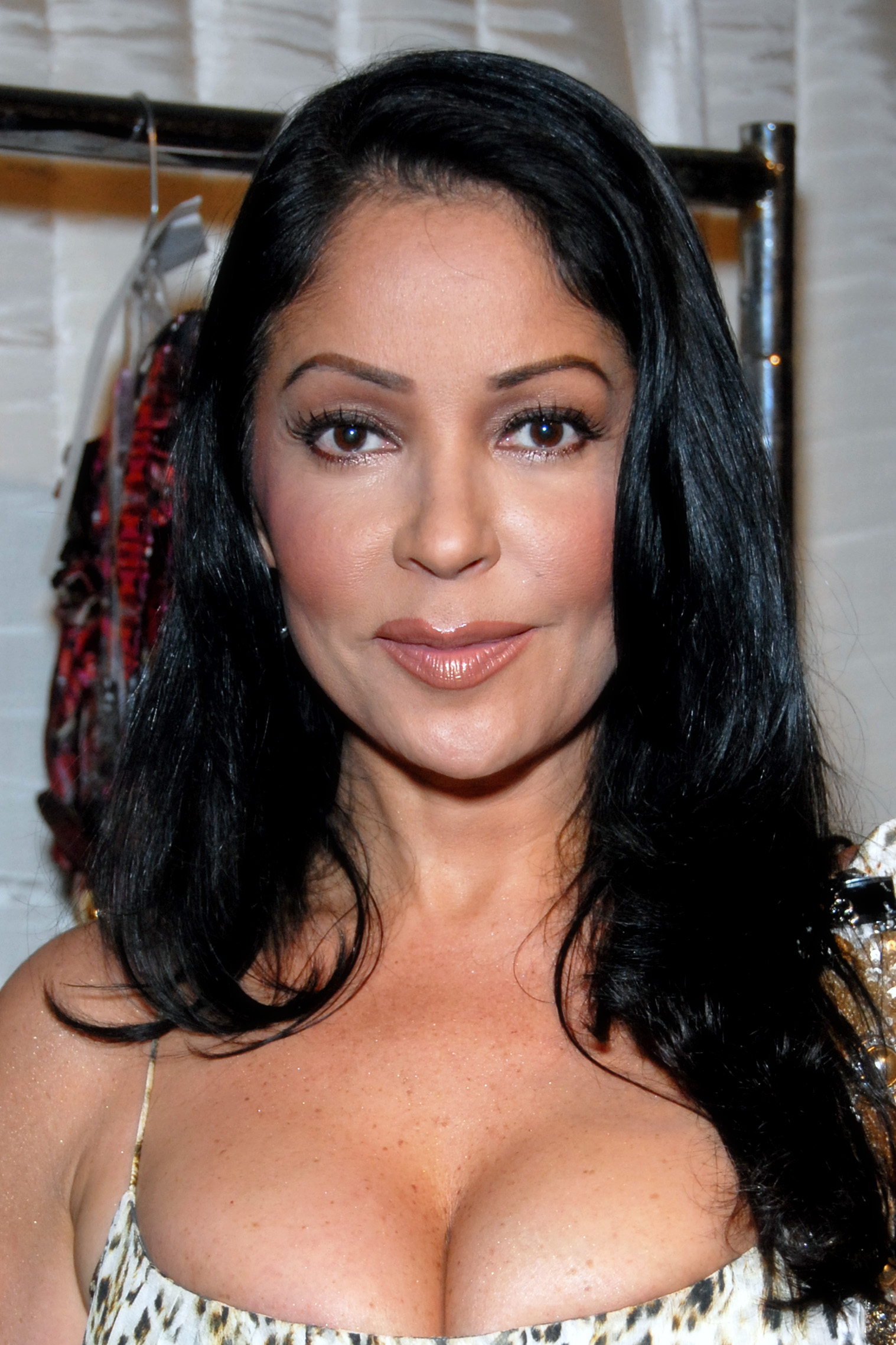
Actress and singer Apollonia Kotero, Los Angeles Rams

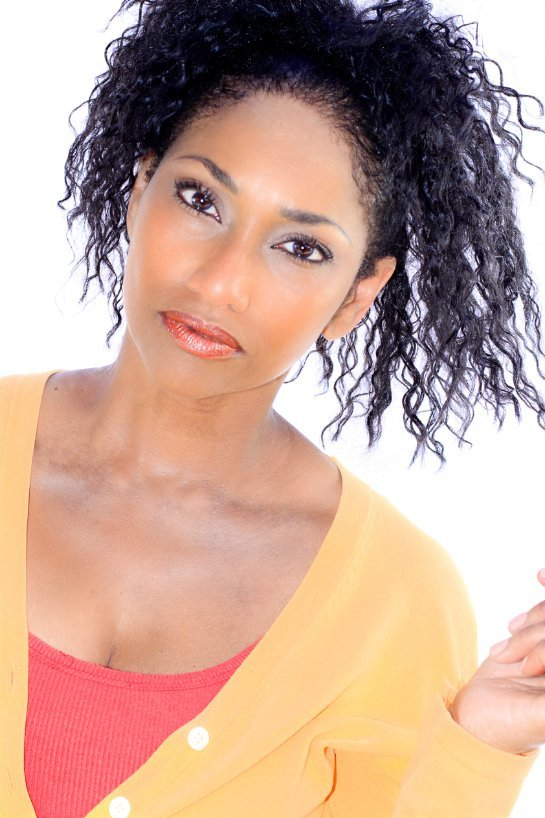
Actress and singer Pamella D'Pella, Cincinnati Bengals

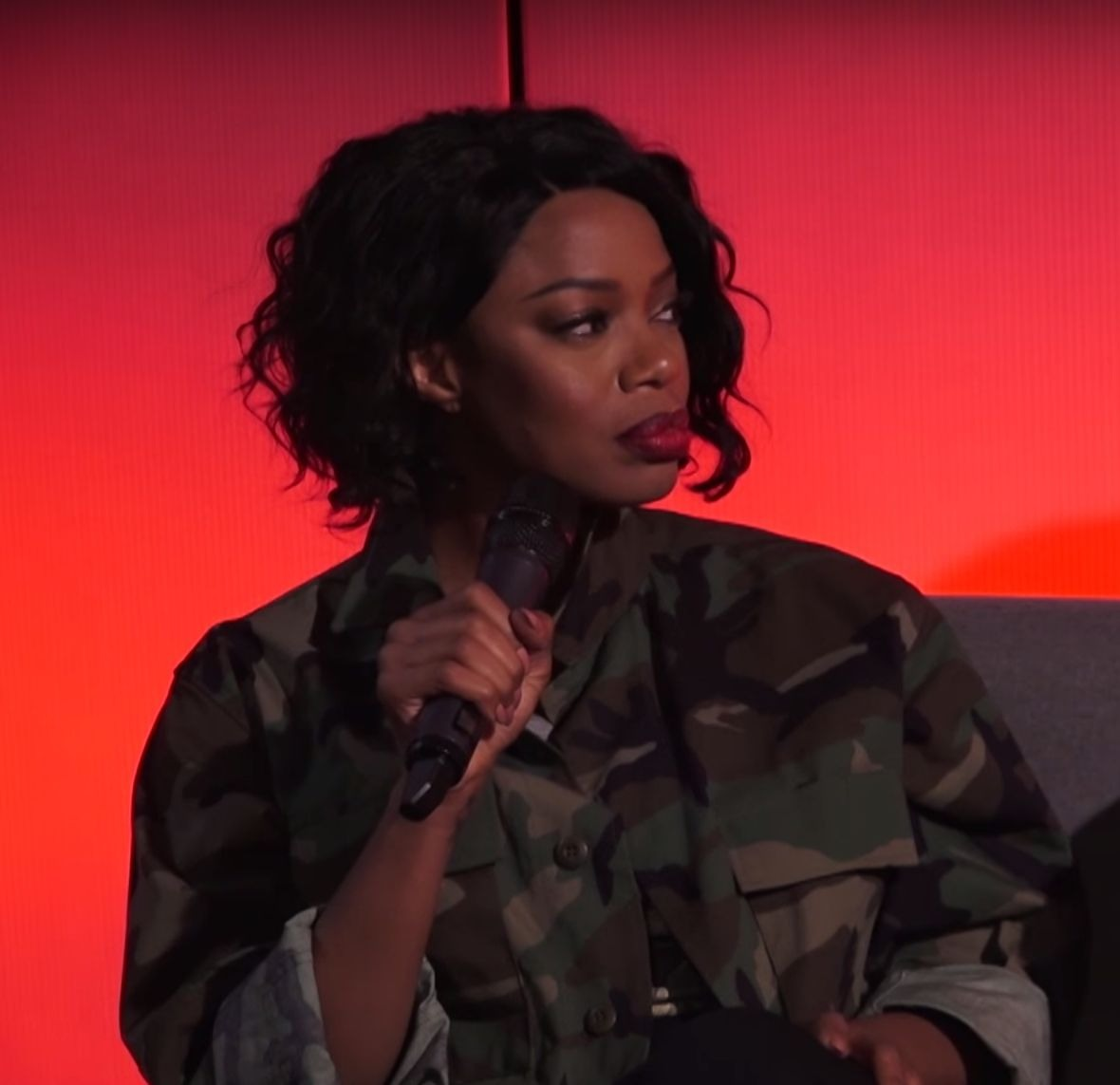
Actress Jill Marie Jones, Dallas Cowboys Cheerleaders

== Gallery ==
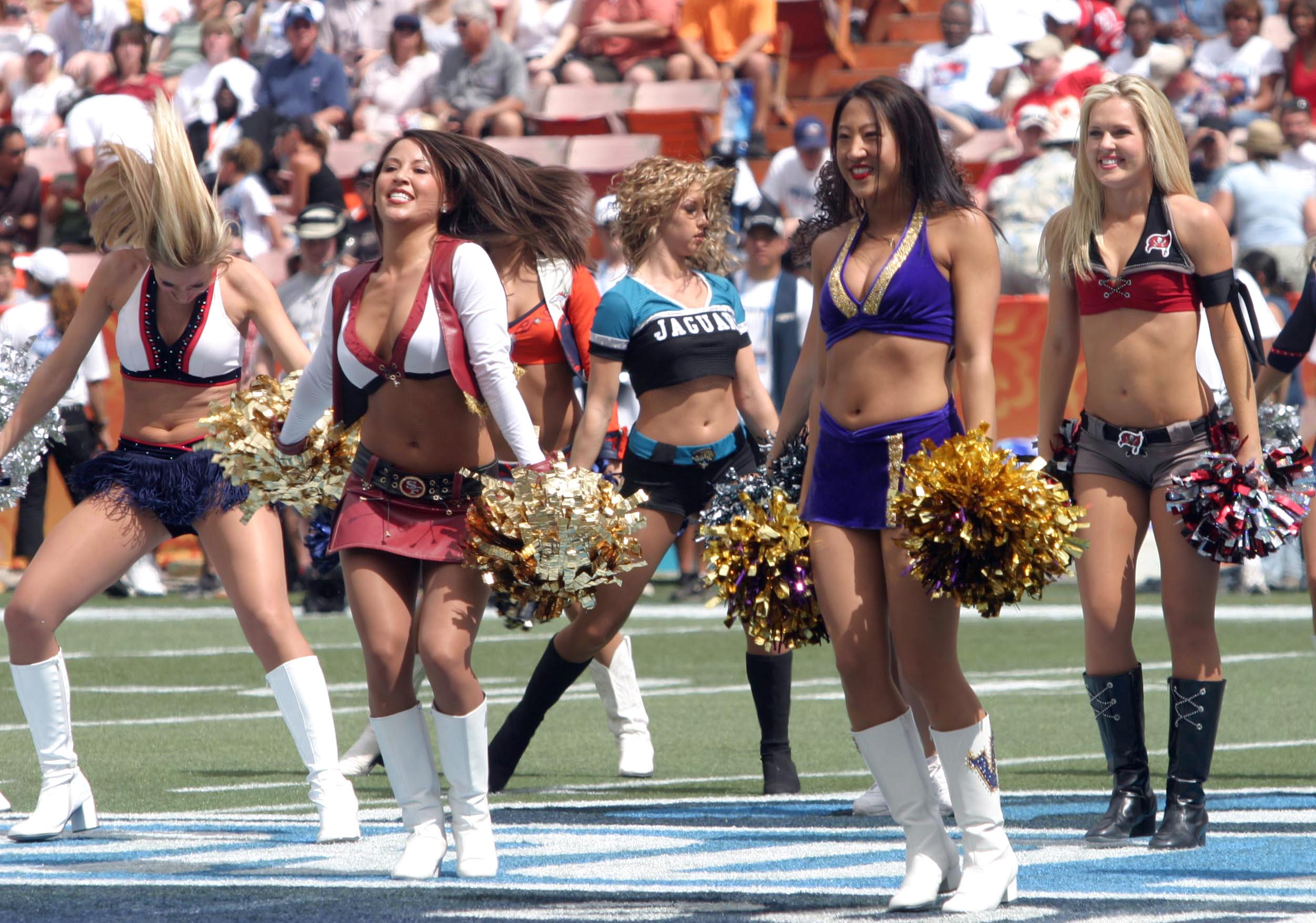
Cheerleaders from each team at the 2006 Pro Bowl.

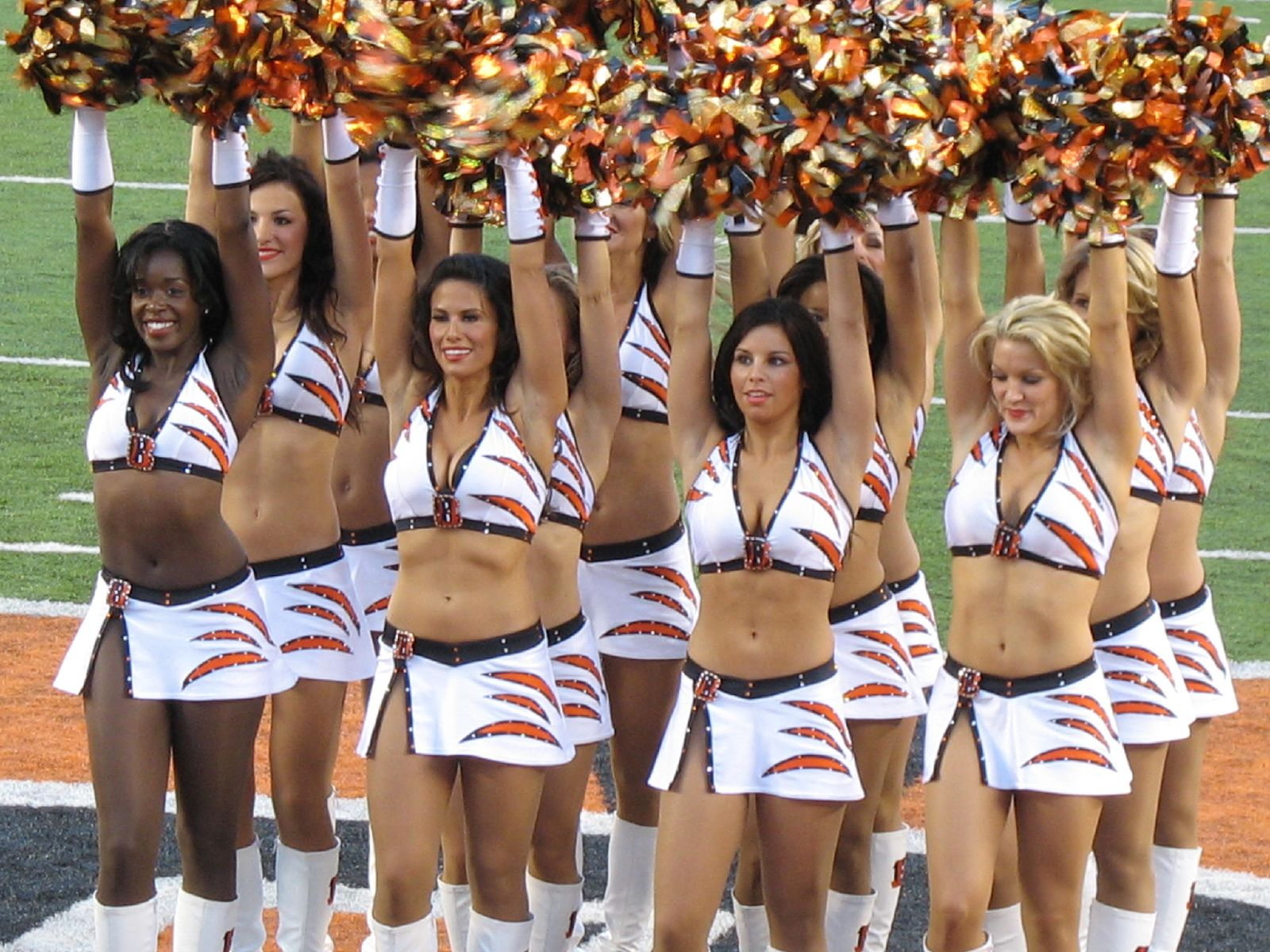
Bengals cheerleaders.

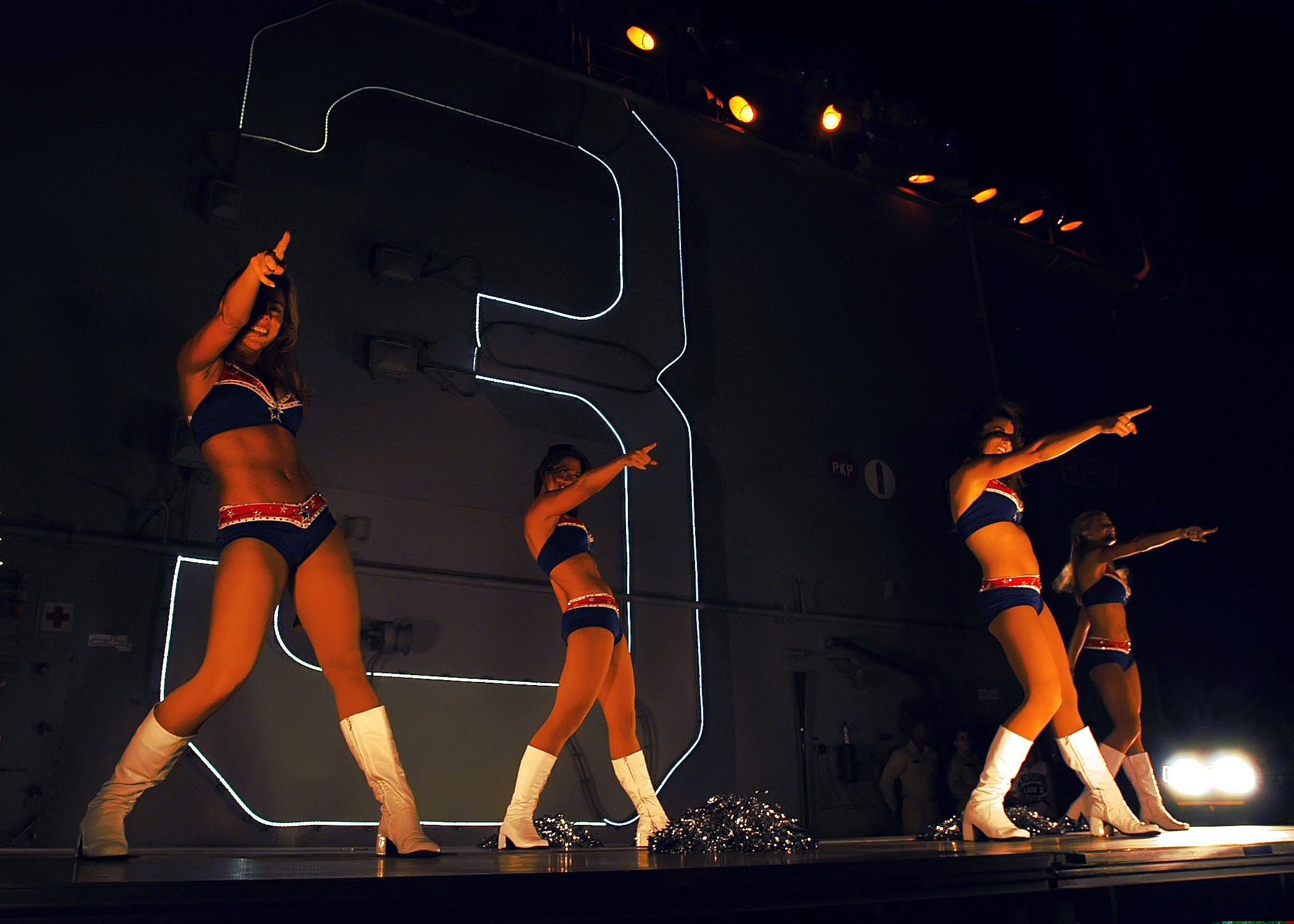
The New England Patriot cheerleaders performing on USS Kearsarge.

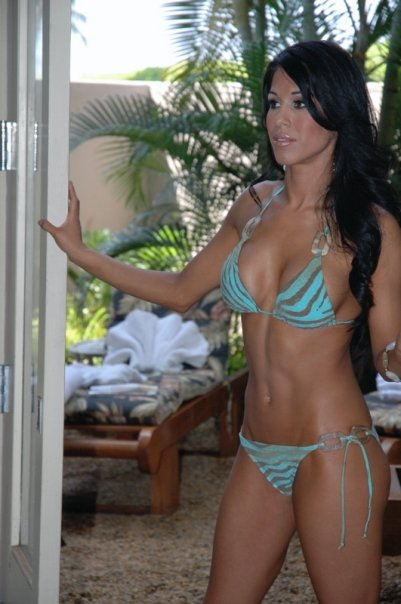
Oakland Raiderette swimsuit shoot.

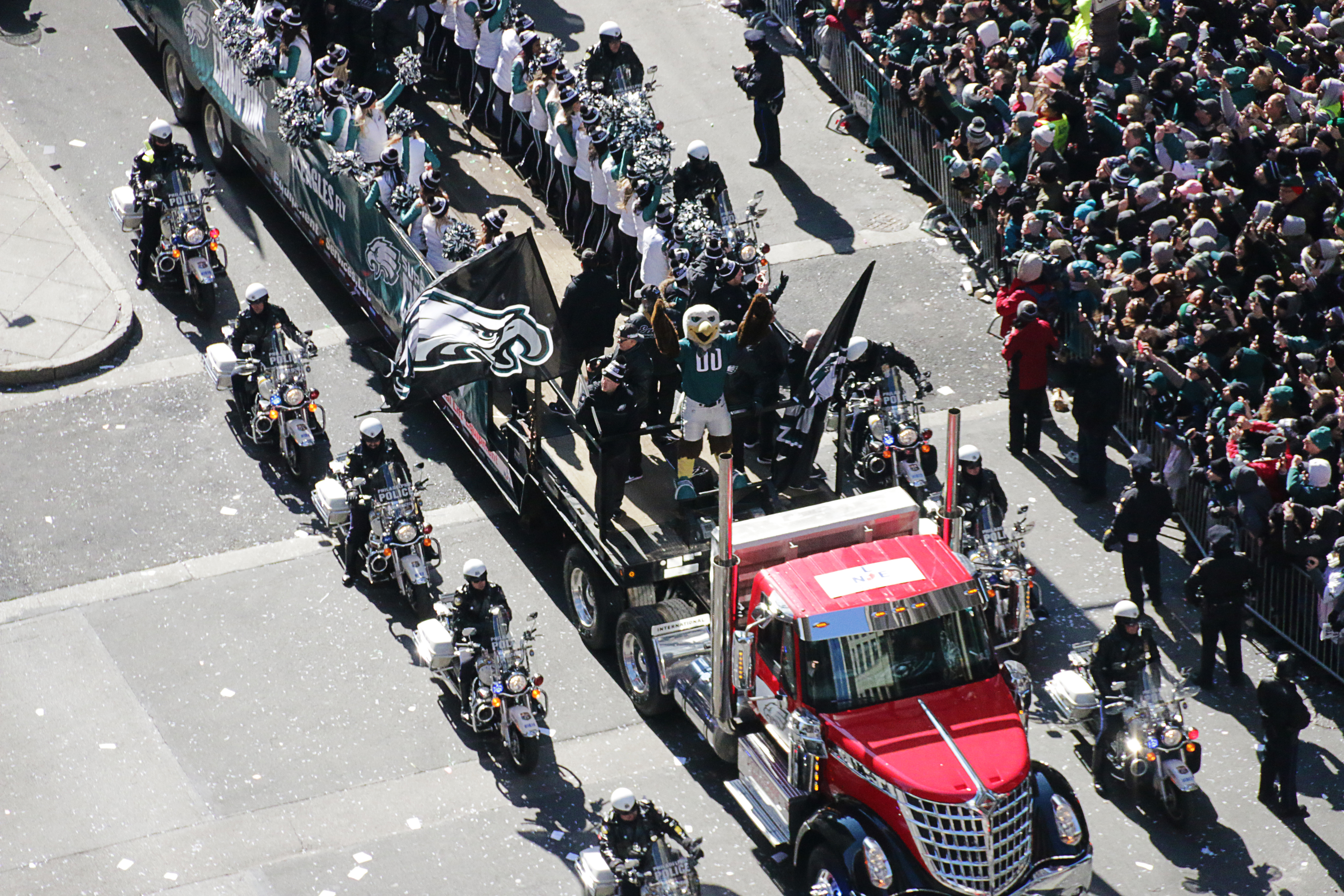
Cheerleaders at the Eagles Super Bowl parade.

== See also ==
- NBA cheerleading
- NHL cheerleading
- List of cheerleaders
- Dallas Cowboys Cheerleaders: Making the Team
- Promotional model
