= Buffalo Jills =

Defunct NFL cheerleader squad

- Nickname: Buffalo's Beauties
- Established: 1967; 59 years ago
- Defunct: 2014; 12 years ago
- Members: 35
- Director: N/A
- Captain: 4 with 4 co-captains
- Affiliations: Buffalo Bills
- Website: buffalojillsalumni.com
- Formerly called: Cheerleaders (1960-1965); Buffalo Jills (1967-2014)

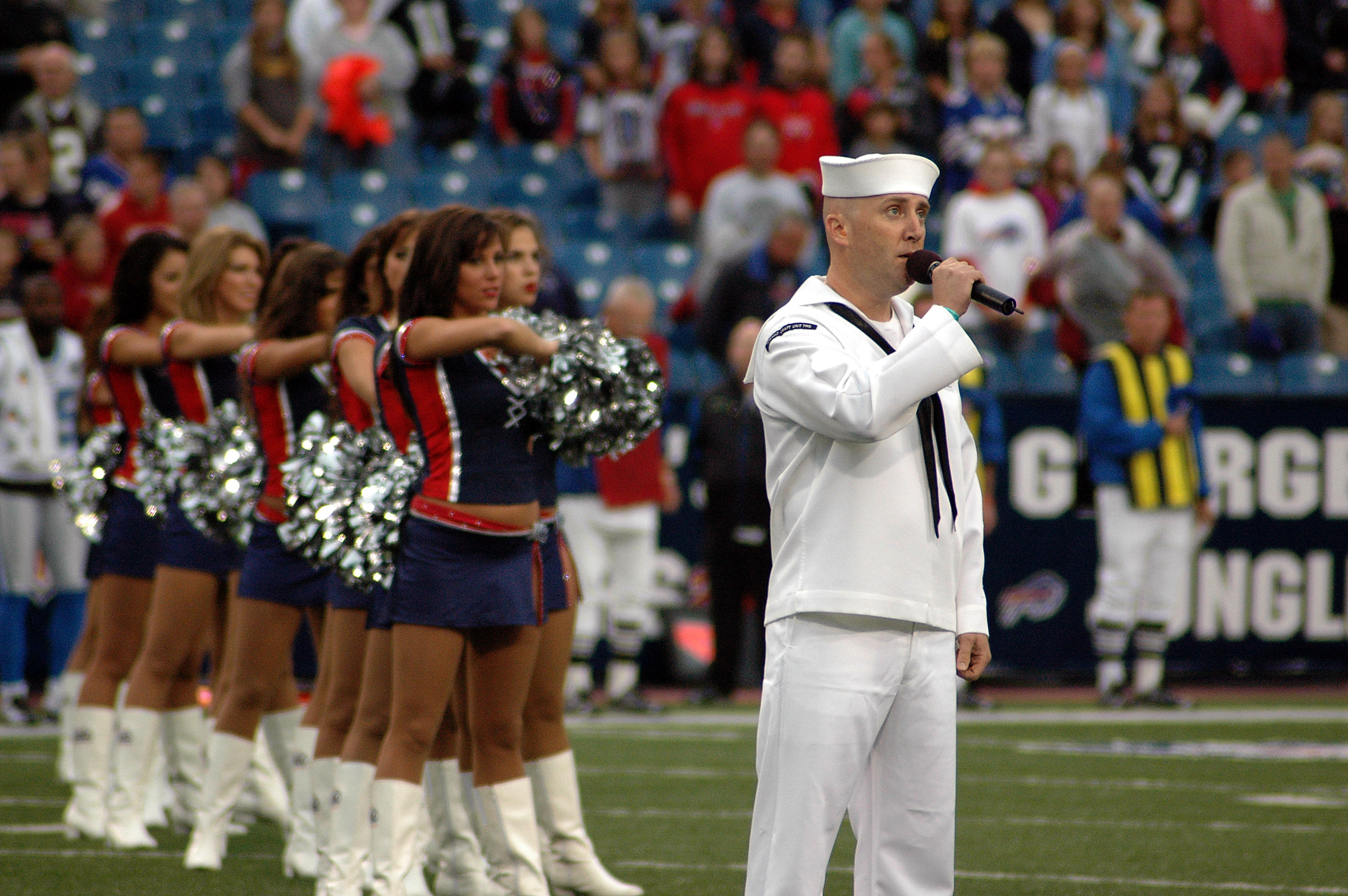
Members of the Buffalo Jills during the singing of the national anthem at a pre-season game on August 28, 2008

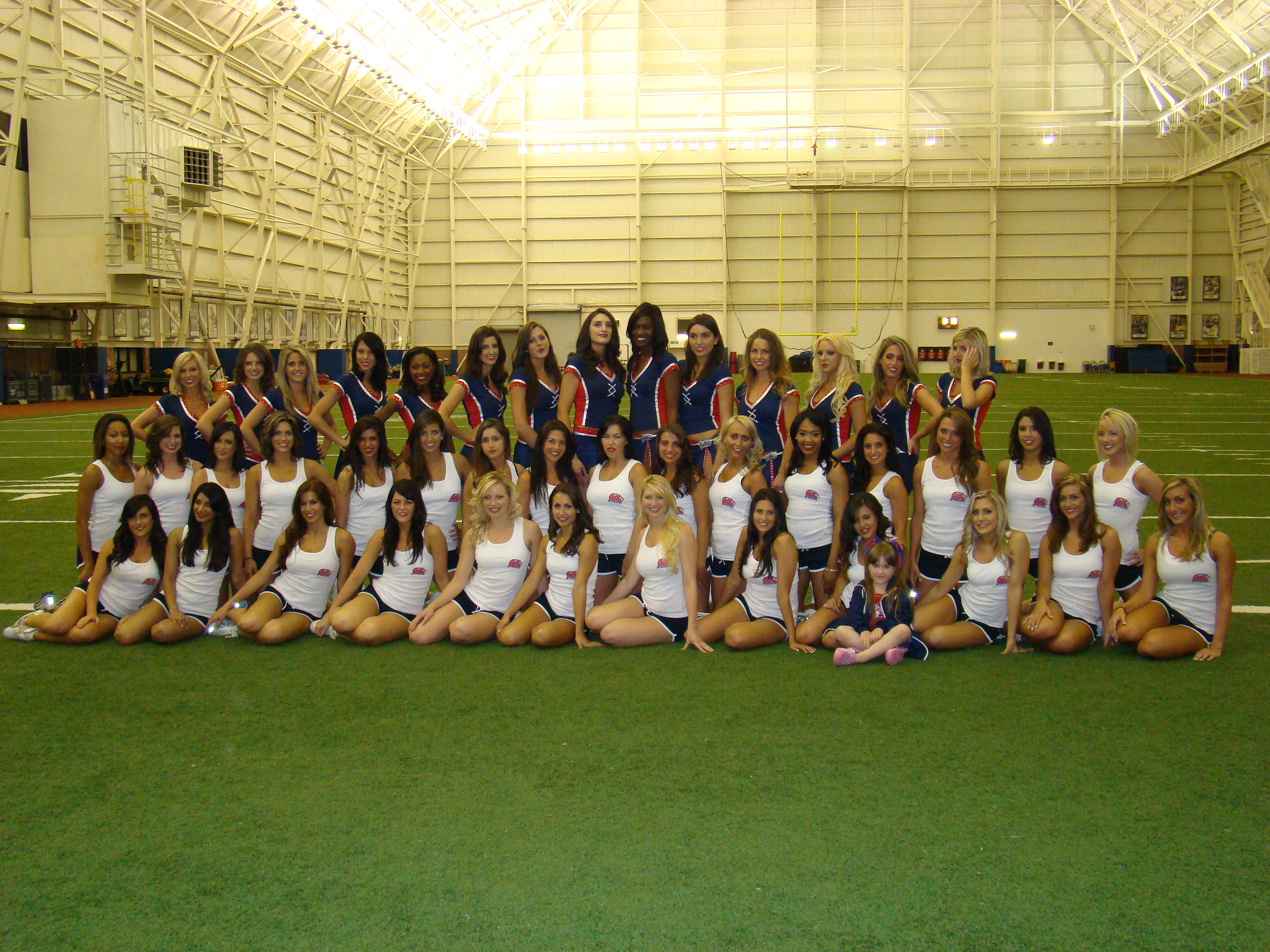
A photo of the 2010-2011 Buffalo Jills squad at their June 1, 2010 Open Practice

The Buffalo Jills were the cheerleading squad for the Buffalo Bills professional American football team.

== History ==
The Bills had cheerleaders in 1960 known simply as the Buffalo Bills Cheerleaders. At the time, they were a group of eight Buffalo State College cheerleaders. They ran this squad until 1965 and went without cheerleaders in 1966. In 1967, the Buffalo Jills were founded by Jo Ann Gaulin and progressed from a few young women in wool uniforms to a squad of 36 young ladies in more-revealing attire.

They annually sold a swimsuit calendar since the 2000-2001 season and participated in various events in the Western New York area. Troop visits were a regular occurrence as well and a group of eight girls spent February 22 - March 4, 2007, visiting troops in Iraq, the only NFL squad on that tour at the time.

In 1986, the Bills discontinued their official ties to the squad and contracted them out to third parties beginning with the fast food chain Mighty Taco. The Bills' continued role (or lack thereof) in employing the squad is currently being disputed in court. In December 2014, Justice Timothy Drury of the New York Supreme Court found that the Bills set the terms of the Jills' contracts and approved them.

In 1995, seeking respect and better pay, the Jills formed the first cheerleaders union in the NFL.

In 2002, the new director instituted an Ambassador Squad, a group of 8-12 Buffalo Jills who did not dance on the sidelines and field. This was not only to allow the squad to more easily meet the demands of all the public appearances they were asked to make, but allowed more young women to make the squad. The Ambassador Squad Jills became a good way to contribute for young women who either did not have the dancing ability required to make the field, or did not have the free time to attend all of the dance squad practices.

In 2006, a pair of Jills swept their first round events in the first year of the NFL Cheerleader Playoffs before falling in the second round.

In 2008, the Jills were the first NFL squad to be multi-national, performing at "home" games both in Orchard Park, New York, and in Toronto, Ontario.

=== Lawsuit and suspension of operations ===
Shortly after the squad's 35 members were selected for the 2014 season, a lawsuit was filed on April 22 by five former Jills that alleged the cheerleaders were not paid for hours they worked. Management then responded 2 days later by "suspending operations" of the cheerleading squad.

On July 3, 2014, NFL Commissioner Roger Goodell was subpoenaed to testify in the case after a document presented by the Bills in their defense contained his signature.

On May 28, 2015 Queens, NY Assemblywoman Nily Rozic introduced a bill in the New York State Assembly to change the New York State labor law to make it clear that professional cheerleaders are employees of the teams for which they cheer.

On May 18, 2017, the plaintiffs scored a major victory in their lawsuit as a New York State Court has ruled the Jills to be non-exempt employees, not independent contractors. However, the court denied partial summary judgement as to whether the Bills themselves were their direct employers, and a jury will decide who the employers were unless a settlement is reached. In November 2017, Cumulus Media, who purchased Citadel Broadcasting (one of the primary sponsors of the Jills), entered Chapter 11 bankruptcy, and in January 2018, the company sought to terminate any remaining Bills-related debts it owed.

As of June 2019, the lawsuit had yet to be settled. Bills owners Terry and Kim Pegula, who completed their purchase of the team after the lawsuit started, have yet to comment on their future plans for the Jills, though they have maintained the cheerleading squad for the Buffalo Bandits, another one of their sports properties.

On March 3, 2022, a settlement was reached in which Cumulus admitted no wrongdoing. A $4 million payment was made by the company in the form of Cumulus stock to the former Jills listed in the suit, while the Buffalo Bills agreed to pay $3.5 million to the Jills.

Despite the cessation of the cheerleading squad, former cheerleaders have organized the Buffalo Jills Alumni Association, which carries out reunion events every few years, and regularly carries out community service activities.
