= Los Angeles Charger Girls =

Defunct cheerleading squad in San Diego and Los Angeles

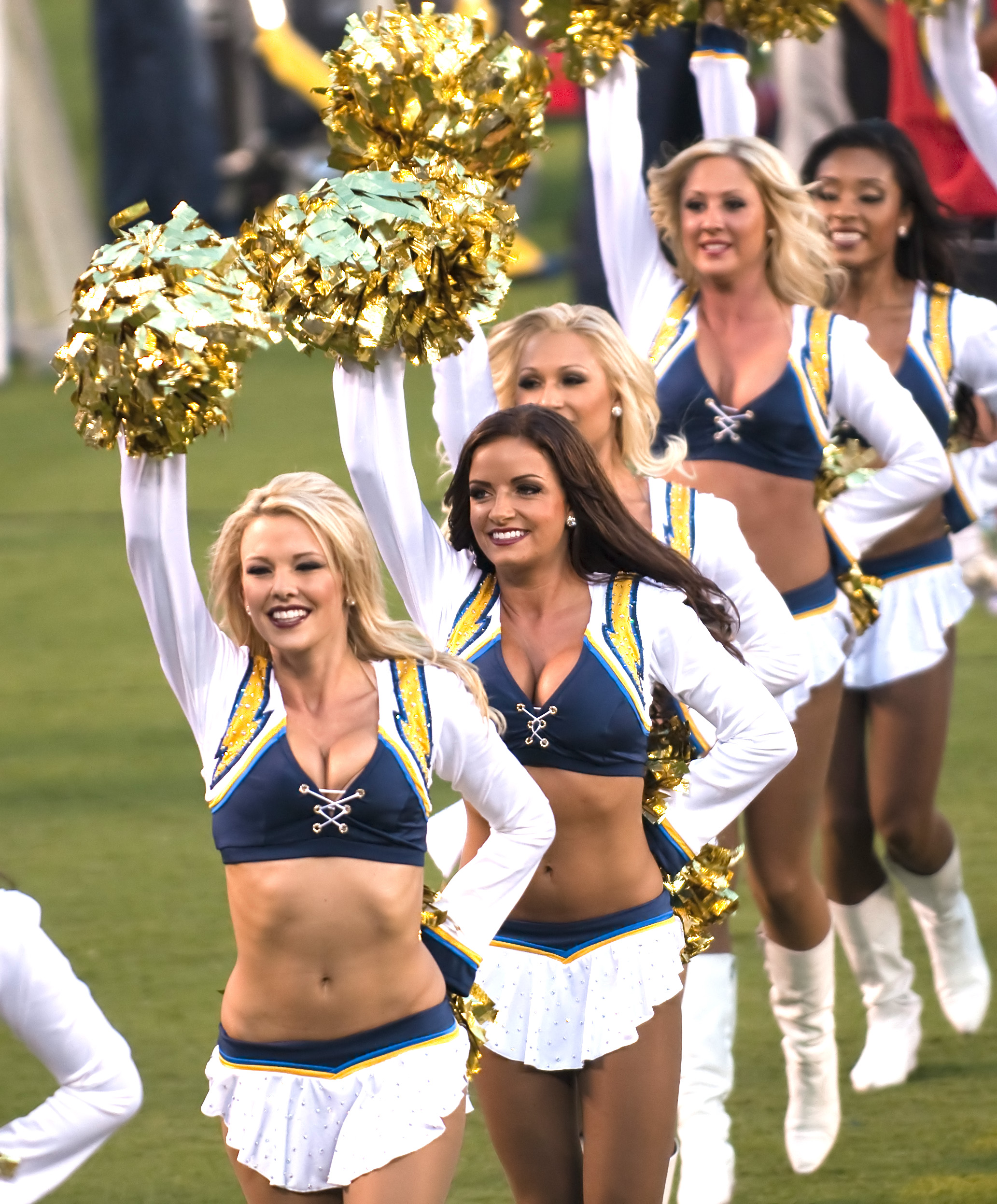
- Established: 1990; 36 years ago
- Defunct: 2021
- Members: 24
- Director: Lisa Simmons
- Affiliations: Los Angeles Chargers
- Website: Official website

The Los Angeles Charger Girls were the National Football League cheerleading squad that represented the National Football League team Los Angeles Chargers.

== History ==
The Charger Girls performed a variety of dance routines during home games. The squad was founded in 1990, and is managed by e2k Event and Entertainment, which also manages the Los Angeles Clippers, Sacramento Kings, and San Francisco 49ers Gold Rush dance teams. Members serve as ambassadors for the Chargers. The squad also makes non-game appearances. The group releases an annual swimsuit calendar. The group also has a Junior Charger Girls squad, with each performer being required to raise $175 in sponsor funds, with the funds going straight to the Make-A-Wish Foundation and Chargers Community Foundation.

The group was disbanded in 2021 for financial reasons.

== Notable member ==
- Charisma Carpenter (1991), actress, played Cordelia Chase on Buffy the Vampire Slayer and had the same role in the long-lived spin-off Angel

== Gallery ==
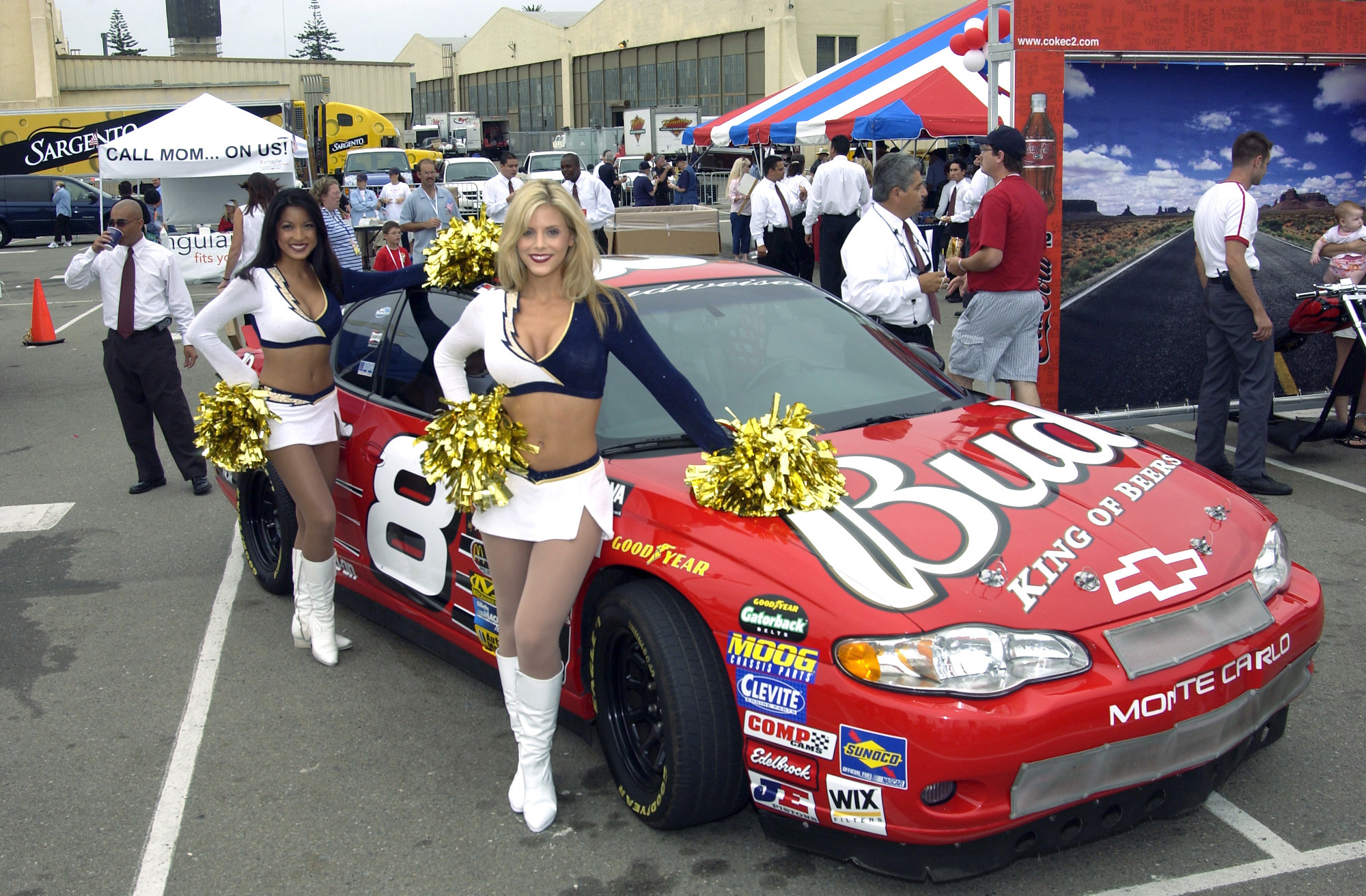

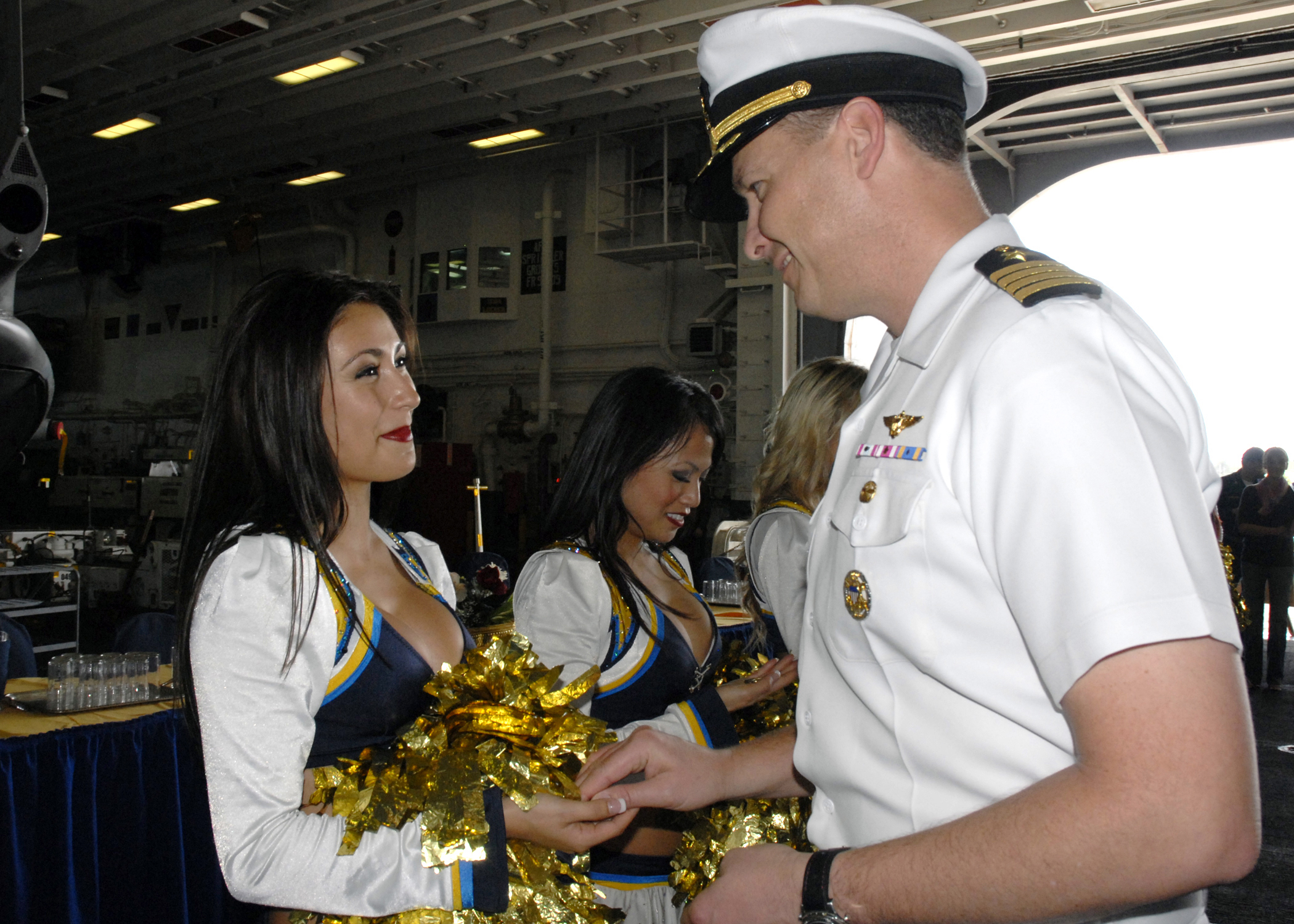

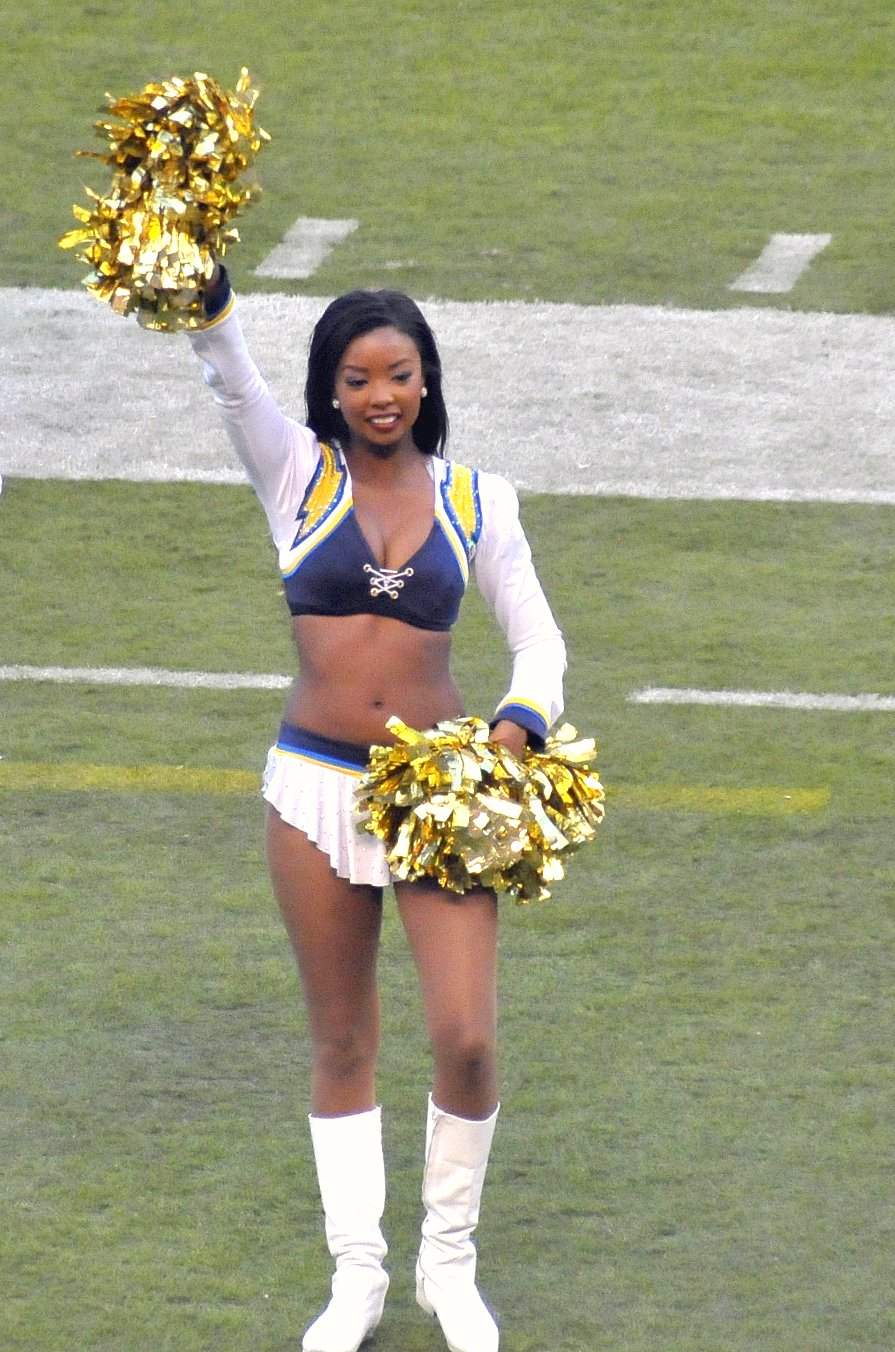

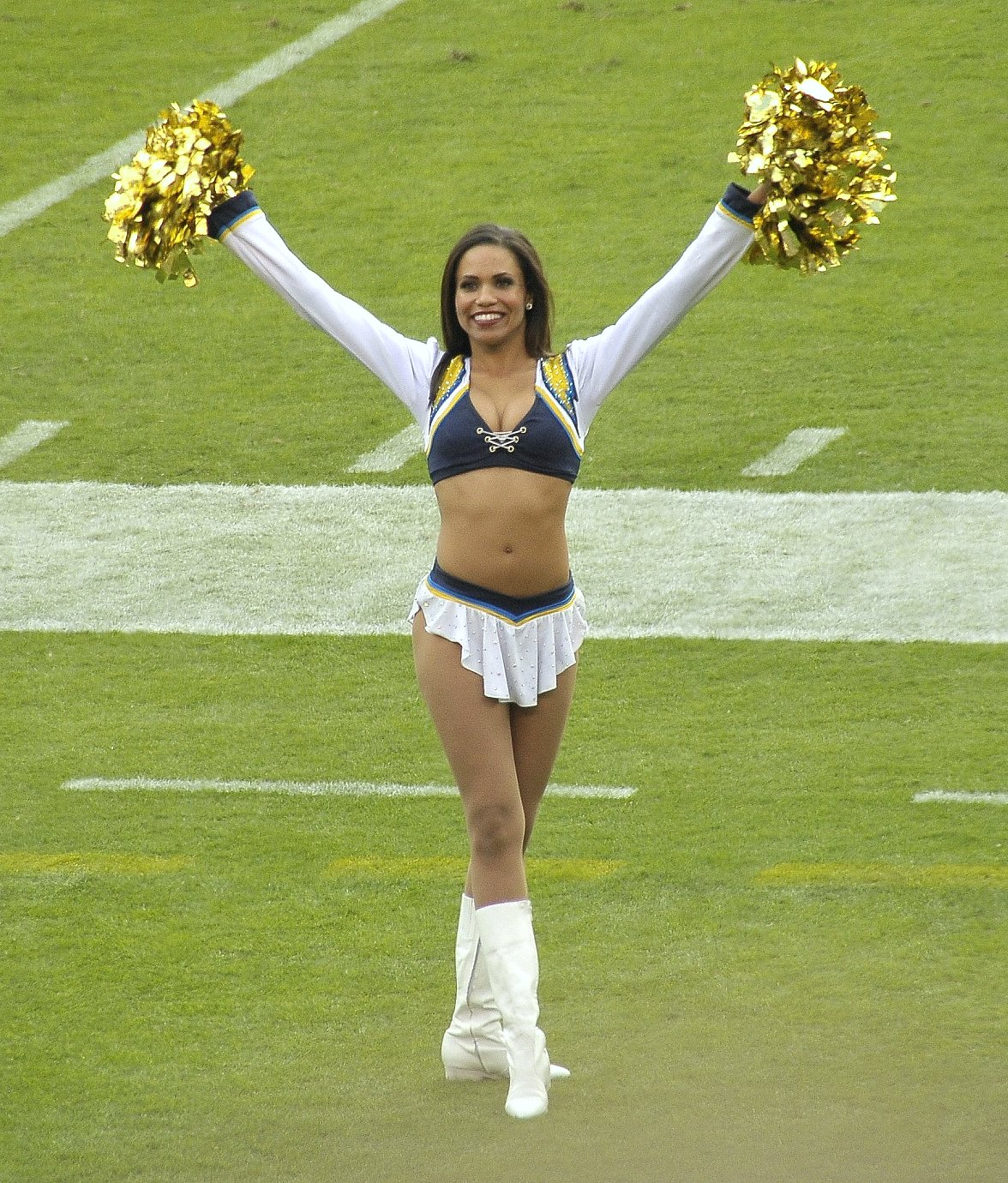

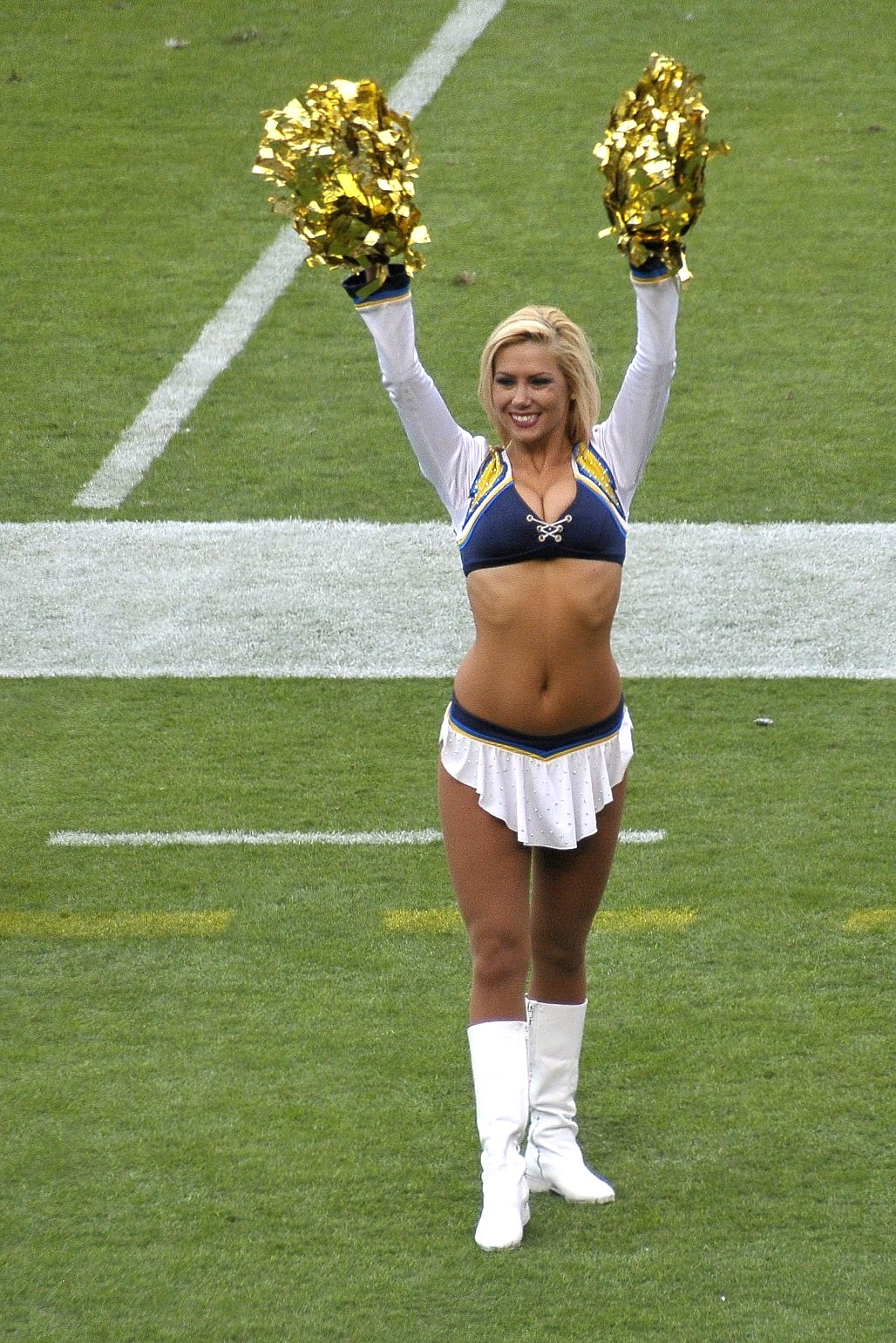
