= Baltimore Ravens Cheerleaders =

NFL cheerleading squad

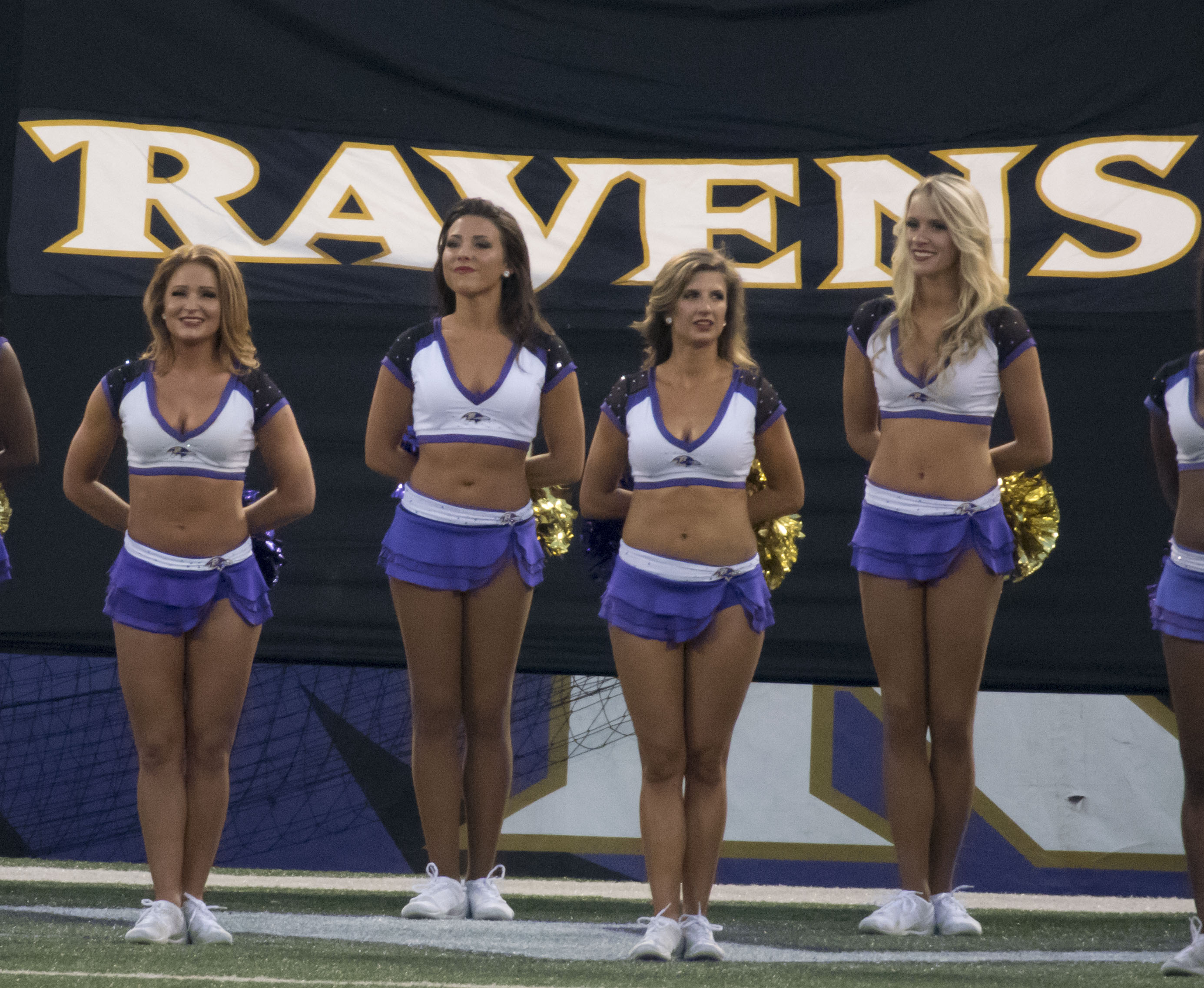
- Redskins at Ravens 8/29/15
- Established: 1998; 28 years ago
- Members: 48
- Affiliations: Baltimore Ravens
- Website: BaltimoreRavens.com

The Baltimore Ravens Cheerleaders are a cheerleading and dance squad for the Baltimore Ravens of the National Football League. Along with the Seattle Seahawks Dancers, the Tennessee Titans Cheerleaders and the Washington Commanders' Command Force, the Ravens squad is a co-ed squad, with the female cheerleaders doing various dance moves, and the males working on stunts, as in traditional cheerleading. The group was founded in 1998, and currently consists of 48 members (20 stunt team performers and 28 dancers). The squad performs at the Ravens home stadium M&T Bank Stadium. The squad's director is Tina Galdieri, who cheered at the 1996 Summer Olympics in Atlanta, as well as the World League of American Football's (later NFL Europe) Barcelona Dragons, and also led the University of Maryland's cheerleading squad to a national championship in 1999. The squad also has a "Lil Ravens" summer program, and unlike the other squads, boys also are permitted to join. The group makes various appearances at parties and corporate functions throughout the year. The female members of the squad also has a swimsuit calendar, with their 2012 calendar taking place in the Bahamas. The squad currently has 31 female members.

The Baltimore Ravens also have a promotional squad known as, The Baltimore Ravens Playmakers. The group also makes various appearances throughout the Baltimore and surrounding areas where they raffle off tickets to an M&T Bank Stadium exclusive area known as The Flite Deck. The squad is present at all home games. The squad currently has 18 female members. The squad also trains at the Maryland Twisters, an All Star Cheerleading gym in Hanover, Maryland, on Tuesday and Thursday nights. As of 2023, the Baltimore Ravens Playmakers program had been retired.

== Notable members ==
- Stacy Keibler (1998–2000), former professional WWE wrestler
- Molly Shattuck (2005-2006), socialite, former record-holder for oldest NFL Cheerleader and convicted sex offender.
