= Jacksonville Roar =

Cheerleading squad of the Jacksonville Jaguars

- Nickname: Roar
- Established: 1995; 31 years ago
- Members: 34
- Director: Christy Stechman Zynda
- Captain: Four, rotating
- Affiliations: Jacksonville Jaguars
- Website: jaguars.com/cheerleaders
- Formerly called: Roar of the Jaguars (1995–2011); Jacksonville Roar (2012–present)

The Jacksonville Roar is the professional cheerleading squad of the Jacksonville Jaguars of the National Football League. The group was established in 1995, the team's inaugural year, and regularly performs choreographed routines during the team's home contests.

== History ==
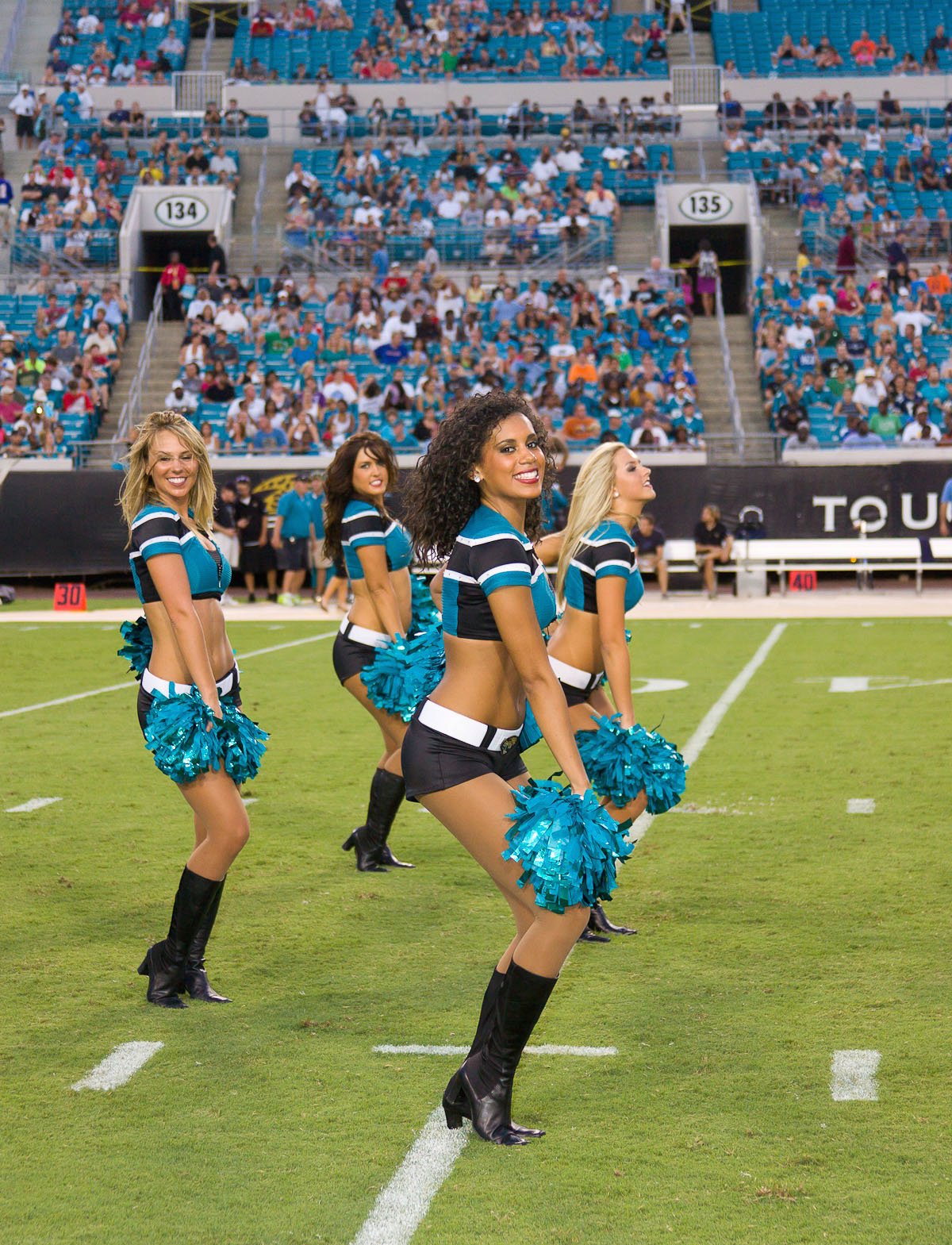
Uniform used from 2008 to 2012

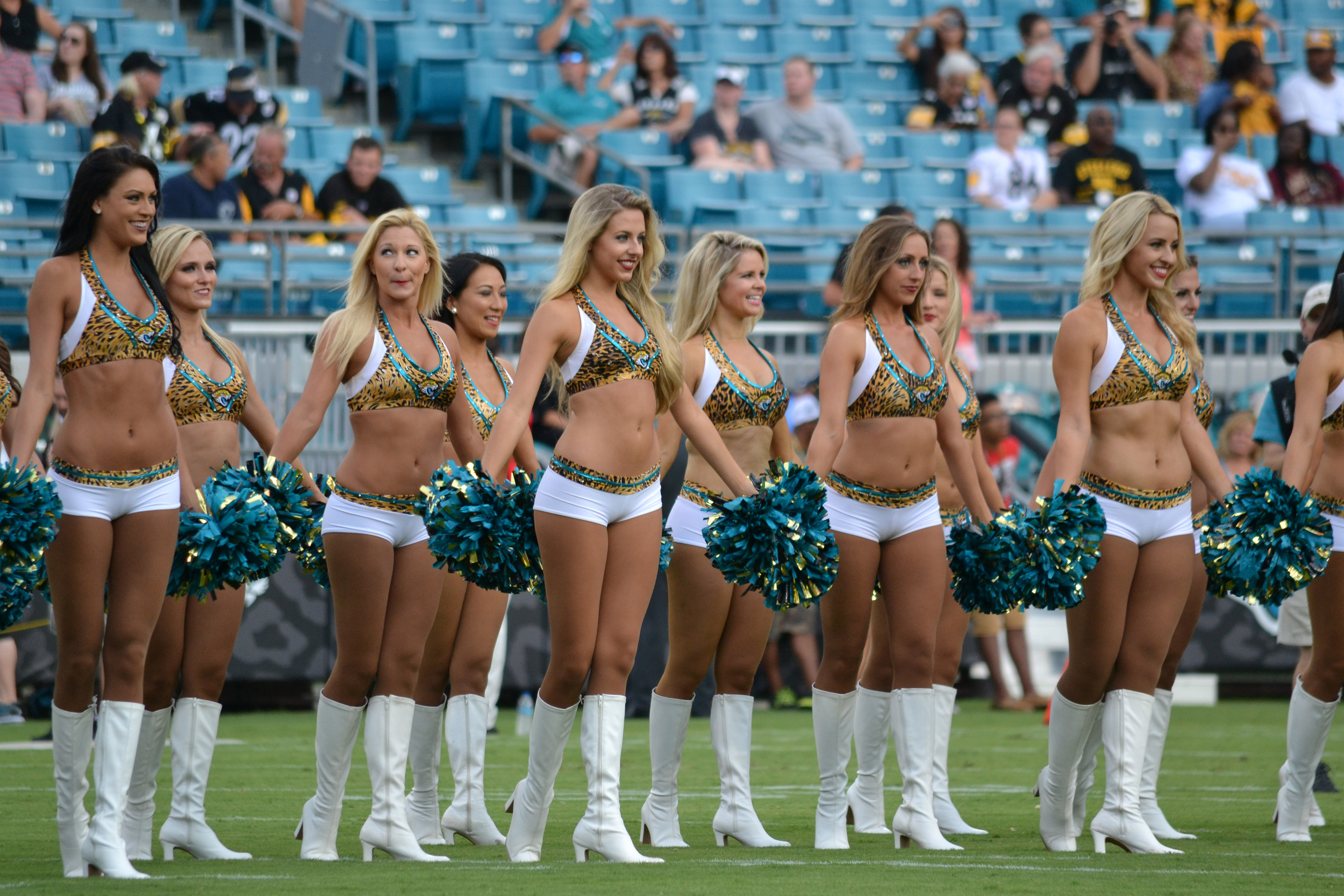
The Roar in 2015

The Jaguars officially announced the creation of the Roar in 1995. Robin Valetutto was the original director in 1995 and continued as director through the 2003 season. Delores Weaver, wife of the first Jaguars owner Wayne Weaver, took a special interest in the cheerleaders when they owned the team. She served as a judge during tryouts, helped design their uniforms and approved their dance routines.

Logo 1995–2013

Tryouts are held each spring and members not returning from the prior year must be replaced. Applicants are judged based on interviews and dance performance. Three "cuts" are made to the group of applicants to determine the final roster. The squad practices several times each week throughout the year except for March, when auditions are held. Cheerleaders are paid for each game based on years of experience, with rookies earning less than $100.

In addition to performing at games and pep rallies, members function as goodwill ambassadors of the team from May to February. They are frequently joined by team mascot Jaxson de Ville to participate in events in the Jacksonville metropolitan area where they sign autographs and pose for pictures. Jaguars marketing and sales operations manager Steve Livingstone commented, "when the cheerleaders do an autograph signing, the interest is just phenomenal". The Jaguars charge $150 per cheerleader per hour for non-charity appearances. They also join NFL tours to entertain US servicemen around the world. The cheerleading squad are also local advocates for female empowerment in the Jacksonville area.

=== Calendar ===
In 1998, a Roar swimsuit calendar was introduced, and has been produced each year since.

=== Junior Roar ===
Each year, 250 girls age 6-17 participate in the Junior Roar program. A three-day clinic is held at TIAA Bank Field where the cheerleaders from the Roar teach dance skills and engage in teambuilding activities in preparation for the Junior ROAR Production during halftime at a Jaguar game. Also the cheerleaders mentor the girls by enriching their interests.

== See also ==
- National Football League Cheerleading
