= Detroit Lions Cheerleaders =

National Football League cheerleading squad

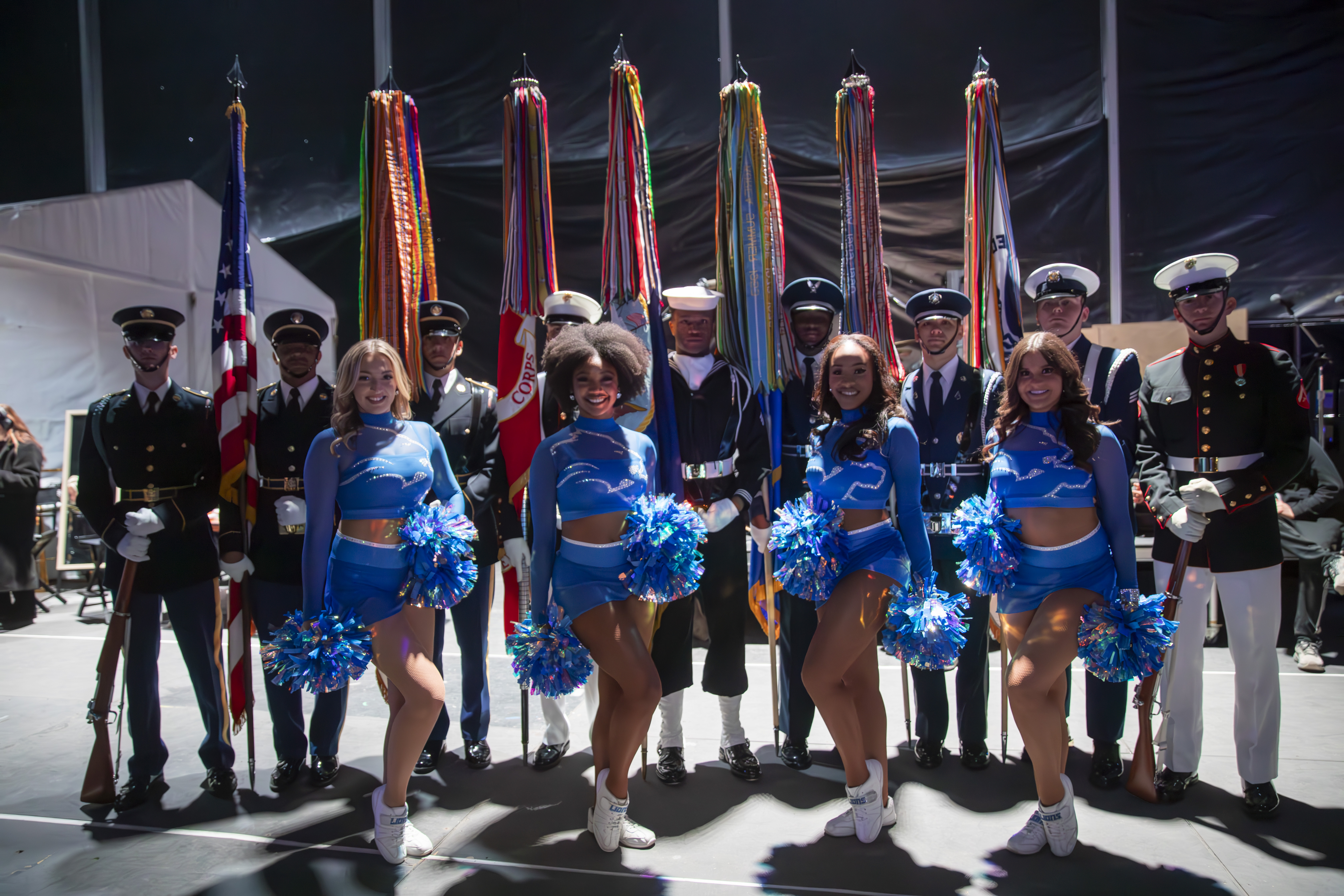
- Detroit Lions Cheerleaders in 2024
- Established: 2016; 10 years ago
- Director: Tori Murphy
- Affiliations: Detroit Lions
- Website: detroitlions.com/cheerleaders

The Detroit Lions Cheerleaders are the National Football League cheerleading squad representing the Detroit Lions.

== History ==
Since moving to Detroit from Portsmouth, Ohio in 1934, the Detroit Lion's have only had one official cheerleading squad before the current one. The Detroit Lions original cheerleading squad formed in 1963 and continued until 1974. Promoters of cheer squads had contacted the team's front office several times only to be rejected, as then owner William Clay Ford Sr. opposed the idea. In August 2010, a group formed the Detroit Pride, which became the unofficial cheerleaders for the team.

On June 12, 2016, the Lions announced their decision to add official cheerleaders to the Lions organization. The team also announced that Rebecca Girard-Smoker, formerly the director of the Detroit Pistons dance team, would be the coach of the cheerleading squad. It marked the first time in over 40 years the team had an official cheerleading squad. The cheerleading squad will be a part of the entertainment during football games, active at community events, and even act as mentors to young girls in the Detroit area.
