= Denver Broncos Cheerleaders =

Official cheerleading squad of the Denver Broncos

- Established: 1993; 33 years ago
- Members: 28
- Director: Shawna Peters
- Affiliations: Denver Broncos
- Website: denverbroncos.com official website

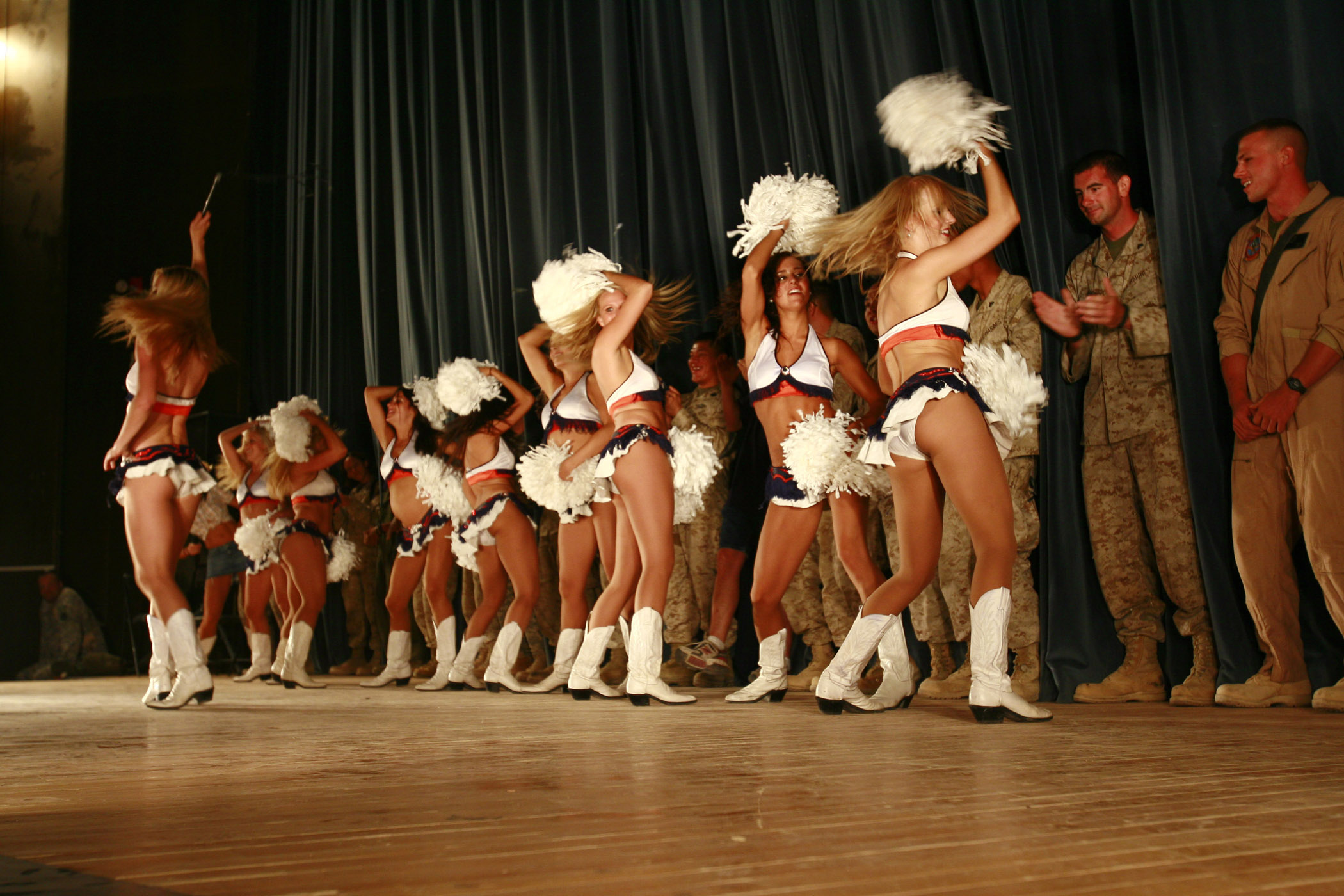
Denver Broncos Cheerleaders

The Denver Broncos Cheerleaders are the official cheerleading squad of the Denver Broncos. In addition to performing on game days, the Denver Broncos Cheerleaders annually commit close to 1,000 hours to various charities and events in Denver and the state of Colorado.

The Cheerleaders wear long leather chaps and jackets in the fall months, skiwear for cold games, and a more traditional cheerleading leather skirt and vest in the summer months.

== History ==
The long history of the Denver Bronco Cheerleaders began in the early 1960s. Prior to the building of Mile High stadium, the Denver Broncos played at the smaller Bear's stadium. Within this smaller stadium, the "South Stands" was both a name for a group of fans and a location. The "South Stands" were a collection of devoted, enthusiastic and raucous fans who bought tickets together, sat together and cheered for the nascent Denver Broncos. The South Stands independently supported a group of 4 to 8 Cheerleaders called the South Stands Cheerleaders.

In 1967/68, 1968/69 and 1969/70, the Denver Broncos first fielded a precision dance team called the Denver Bronco Broncettes. The unpaid team, under the direction of Victoria “Miss Vicki” Clarkson consisted of 26 to 30 high school and post high school young women, aged 16 to 19. The Broncettes performed precision pregame dance routines and side line dance/cheer. In addition, the Broncettes performed for various public events throughout the Denver community. Echos of the costume designed for the Broncettes (based on a royal blue turtle neck leotard, with a white satin Western-styled bolero vest, fringed skirt, gauntlet style cuffs and white boots) can be found in the design of the dance/cheer teams that followed. <Former Broncette, 1967 - 1970>

In 1971, the all-adult squad debuted as the Bronco Belles and became the Pony Express in 1977. The group eventually disbanded in 1985. The Broncos brought the team back in 1993 after a 7-year absence and are proud of the work the team does both on the field and, more importantly, in the community.

The Broncos Cheerleaders have 26 members who are selected during open auditions held each spring. Auditions focus primarily on dance ability; however, appearance, personal accomplishments, and community involvement are also contributing factors.

Known for their distinctive western uniforms, the Cheerleaders wear long leather chaps and jackets in the fall months, skiwear for cold games, and a more traditional cheerleading leather skirt and vest in the summer months. The three uniform changes give the group flexibility with the rapidly changing Colorado weather.

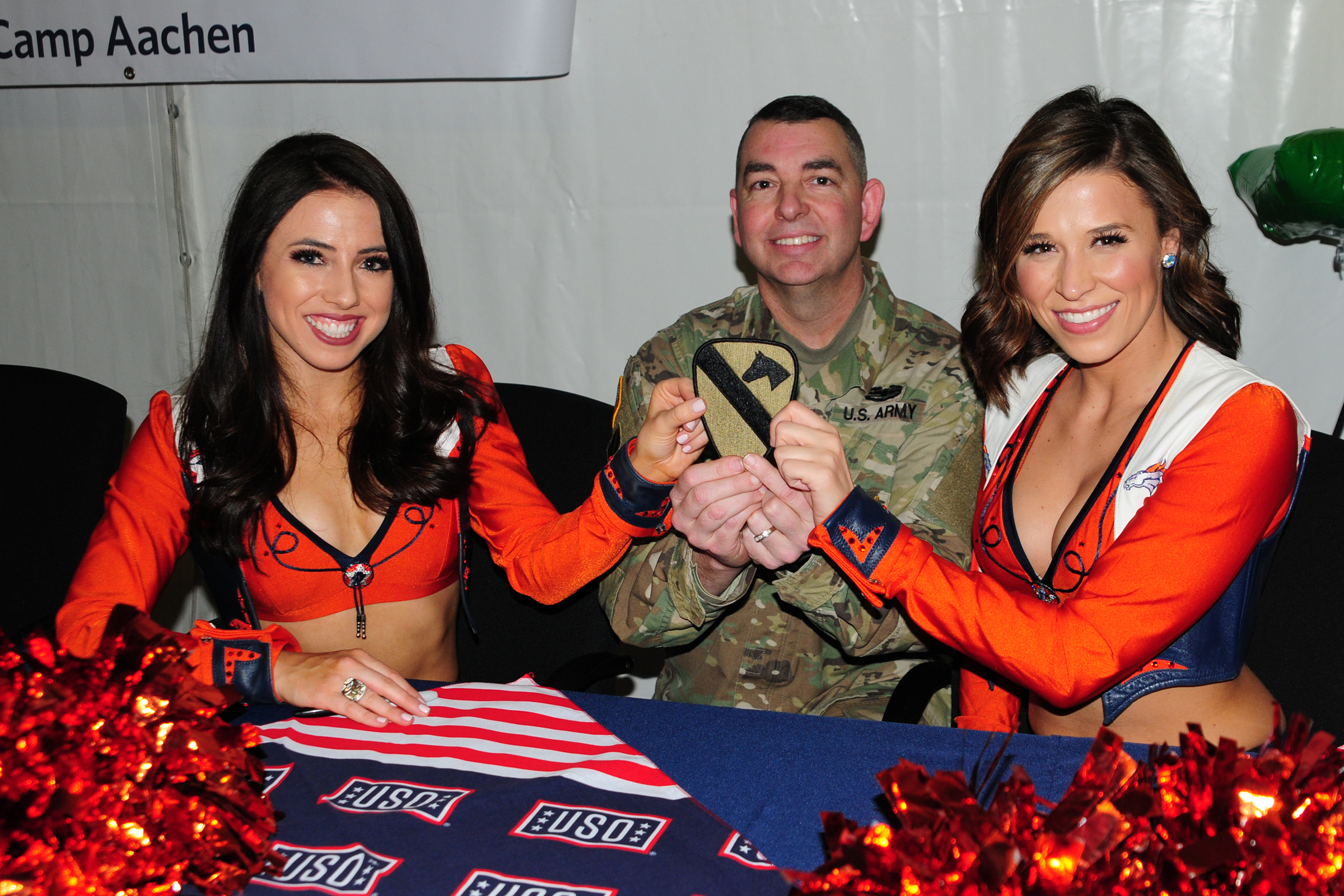
Broncos cheerleaders with soldier

The Denver Broncos Cheerleaders host a Junior program known as the Junior Denver Broncos Cheerleaders (JDBC), which gives young women ages six to fourteen an opportunity to perform alongside the cheerleaders during pregame and halftime shows on game day. Also, the Broncos Cheerleaders mentor these young girls and serve as role models by enriching their interests.

Since 2008, the Dare to Cheer program, in partnership with the Global Down Syndrome Foundation, has reached out to young women with disabilities to share the joy of Broncos football with them. The Dare to Cheer program was integrated into the JDBC program starting in 2013, giving these women additional opportunities to perform with the Denver Broncos Cheerleaders on game day.

While the JDBC and Dare to Cheer programs require no tryouts and are tailored to young women of all ability levels, the Denver Broncos All Stars is a competitive dance team aimed at young girls who want to take their performance ability to the next level. In addition to training regularly with instructors who are current/alumni Denver Broncos Cheerleaders, the All Star program also focuses on charity work, team building, and achievement. From 2003 to 2015, members of the Denver Broncos Cheerleaders have toured military bases in Egypt, Cuba, Iraq, Afghanistan, Italy, Guam, Hawaii, Kwajalein, Japan, and Australia, performing their 90-minute show to boost the troops’ morale and thank them for their service to the United States of America. In 2015, the Denver Broncos Cheerleaders were selected to represent the United States in the Cathay Pacific International Chinese New Year Night Parade in Hong Kong.

== Notable members ==
- Michelle Beisner, NFL Network
- Lauren Gardner, (2007–2008), sportscaster of CBS Sports Network
