= San Francisco 49ers Gold Rush =

Cheer squad of the San Francisco 49ers

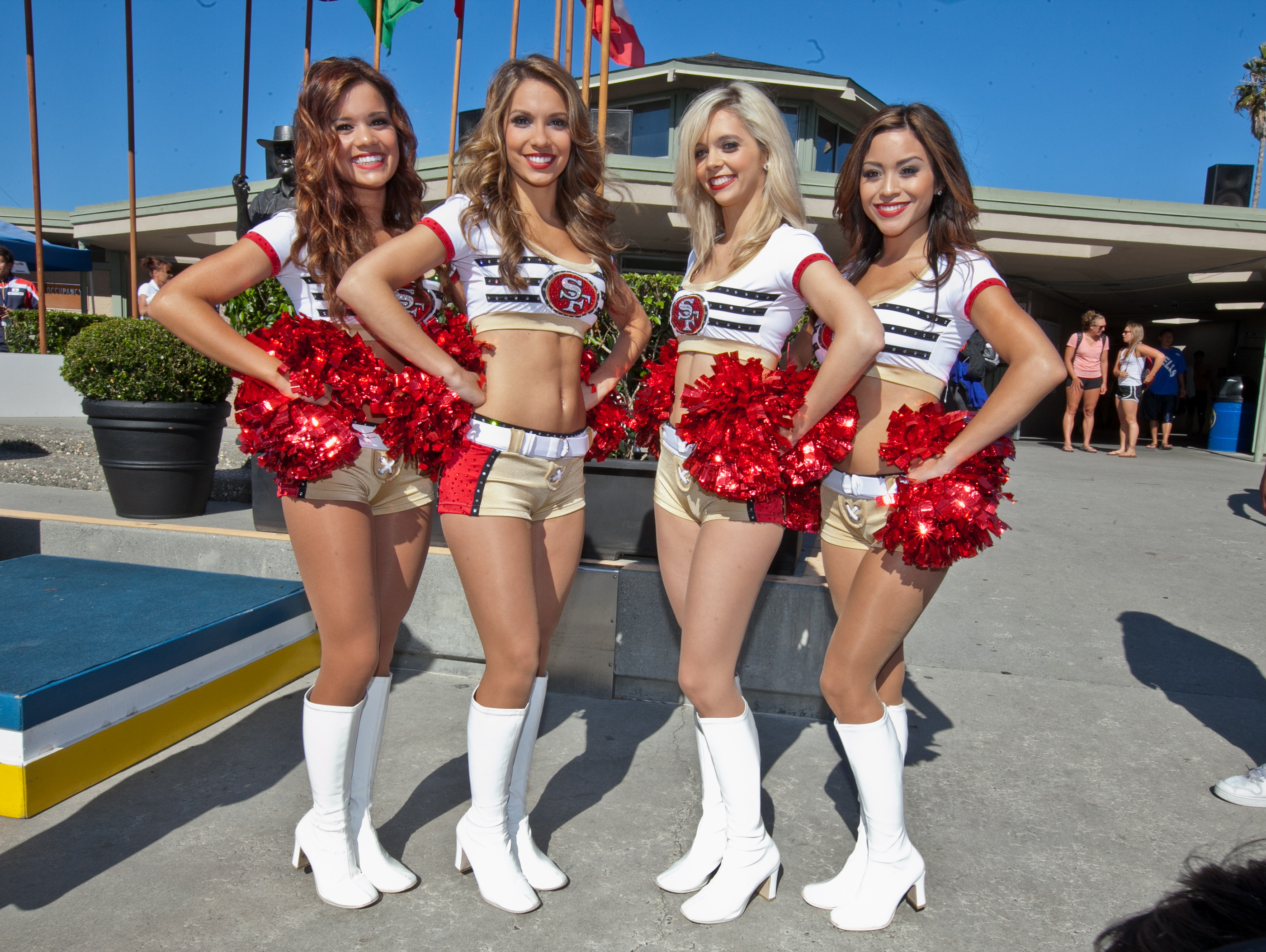
- Four members of the cheerleading team at a community event in 2012
- Established: 1979; 47 years ago
- Members: 40
- Affiliations: San Francisco 49ers
- Website: Official website
- Formerly called: Niner Nuggets (1946–1970)

The San Francisco 49ers Gold Rush Cheerleaders are the cheerleading team for the NFL's San Francisco 49ers. The current team was founded in 1983 by USA, which has been renamed to e2k. They have performed throughout the United States, Europe, and Japan. They are also involved in many charitable events.

They have been featured on many television stations, such as ESPN and the Fox Network, in addition to television shows such as Entertainment Tonight, MTV, Extra!, and The Leeza Show. They attend every home game and have a total of 32 professional dancers. At Kezar Stadium, the cheerleaders were called The Niner Nuggets. They were known at the time as the only singing cheerleading squad in the NFL.

On November 1, 2018, an unnamed 49ers Gold Rush Cheerleader became the first NFL cheerleader to kneel in silent protest, a protest started in 2016 by the former 49ers’ quarterback Colin Kaepernick.

== Notable members ==
- Teri Hatcher, (1984), actress
- Angela King-Twitero, executive and CEO of The House of AKD
- Bonnie-Jill Laflin, (1994–1996), model, actress, television personality

== See also ==
- NFL Cheerleaders
