= Angela King-Twitero =

Director and CEO of House of AKD cheer uniforms

Angela King-Twitero is a professional cheerleading director and CEO of House of AKD cheer uniforms.

== Career ==
She was a member of the first cheerleading squad for the San Francisco 49ers in 1983 and was on the cheerleading squad for 7 years. In 1992, she became the director of the 49ers Cheerleaders and held this position for 5 years. She coordinated the cheerleaders for the San Diego Chargers and co-founded the NFL Pro Bowl Cheerleaders in 1992.

Angela made history as the only NFL director to direct both cheerleading teams in a Super Bowl, (Super Bowl XXIX); directing the San Diego Charger Girls and the San Francisco 49er Gold Rush. In the NBA, Angela coordinated the dancers for the Los Angeles Clippers, Golden State Warriors and the Sacramento Kings.

In 1989, she founded the first company in professional sports to design and manufacture uniforms for professional sports cheerleaders and dancers. King-Twitero developed the first technique for applying rhinestones to dance wear with an adhesive that allowed the fabric to stretch. She was on the development team for Capezio Ballet-Makers that created the first cheer/dance shoe designed for ease in stunting and pointing the toes.

King-Twitero received accolades from Sports Illustrated in 2001 for Best Costume Design highlighting her work on the XFL cheerleader uniforms. Her designs received attention from publications such as Women's Wear Daily, The Wall Street Journal, USA Today, Star and People. Her designs were selected to costume the VH1 television show Hit The Floor for multiple seasons.

In 2002, she wrote the first book for aspiring directors to a professional team. As a national spokesperson for the professional community, she appeared on Entertainment Tonight, Extra, ESPN and other radio and television shows.
