= The Amazing Race 34 =

Season of television series

- Season 34
- Region 1 DVD cover
- Presented by: Phil Keoghan
- No. of teams: 12
- Winners: Derek Xiao and Claire Rehfuss
- No. of legs: 10
- Distance traveled: 11,000 mi (18,000 km)
- No. of episodes: 12

Release
- Original network: CBS
- Original release: September 21 – December 7, 2022

Additional information
- Filming dates: May 25 – June 16, 2022

Series chronology
- ← Previous; Season 33 Next → Season 35

The Amazing Race 34 is the thirty-fourth season of the American reality competition show The Amazing Race. Hosted by Phil Keoghan, it featured twelve teams of two, each with a pre-existing relationship, competing in a race around the Euro-Mediterranean region to win US$1,000,000. This season visited three continents and eight countries, traveling approximately 11,000 miles (18,000 km) over ten legs. Filming took place from May 25 to July 16, 2022. Starting in Munich, racers traveled through Germany, Austria, Italy, Jordan, France, Spain, and Iceland, before returning to the United States and finishing in Nashville. Much like the previous season, this season used a chartered plane rather than commercial airlines to facilitate travel between countries due to the COVID-19 pandemic. New elements introduced in this season include an international starting line during the first leg; the Scramble, where teams could perform the first leg's tasks in any order; and eliminating a team in every leg. The season premiered on CBS on September 21, 2022, and concluded on December 7, 2022.

Dating couple Derek Xiao and Claire Rehfuss (from Big Brother 23) were the winners of this season, while long-lost twins Emily Bushnell and Molly Sinert finished in second place, and married couple Luis Colon and Michelle Burgos finished in third place.

== Format ==
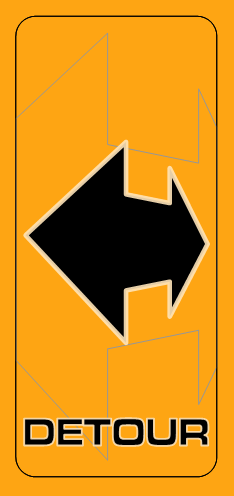
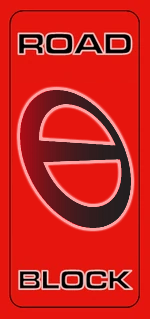
The clues which contestants receive during the course of the race generally fall into three categories: Route Info, Detour, and Roadblock.

The Amazing Race is a reality television show created by Bertram van Munster and Elise Doganieri, and hosted by Phil Keoghan. The series follows teams of two competing in a race around the world. Each leg of the race requires teams to deduce clues, navigate foreign environments, interact with locals, perform physical and mental challenges, and travel on a limited budget provided by the show. At each stop during the leg, teams receive clues inside sealed envelopes, which fall into one of these categories:

- Route Info: These are simple instructions that teams must follow before they can receive their next clue.
- Detour: A Detour is a choice between two tasks. Teams may choose either task and switch tasks if they find one option too difficult. There is usually one Detour present on each leg.
- Roadblock: A Roadblock is a task that only one team member can complete. Teams must choose which member will complete the task based on a brief clue they receive before fully learning the details of the task. There is usually one Roadblock present on each leg.
- Scramble: A Scramble allows teams to complete a set of three tasks in any order that they choose. At the end of each task, teams receive one of three clue puzzle pieces that reveal their next destination after they are combined.

Most teams who arrive last at the Pit Stop of each leg are progressively eliminated, while the first team to arrive at the finish line in the final episode wins the grand prize of US$1,000,000.

== Contestants ==
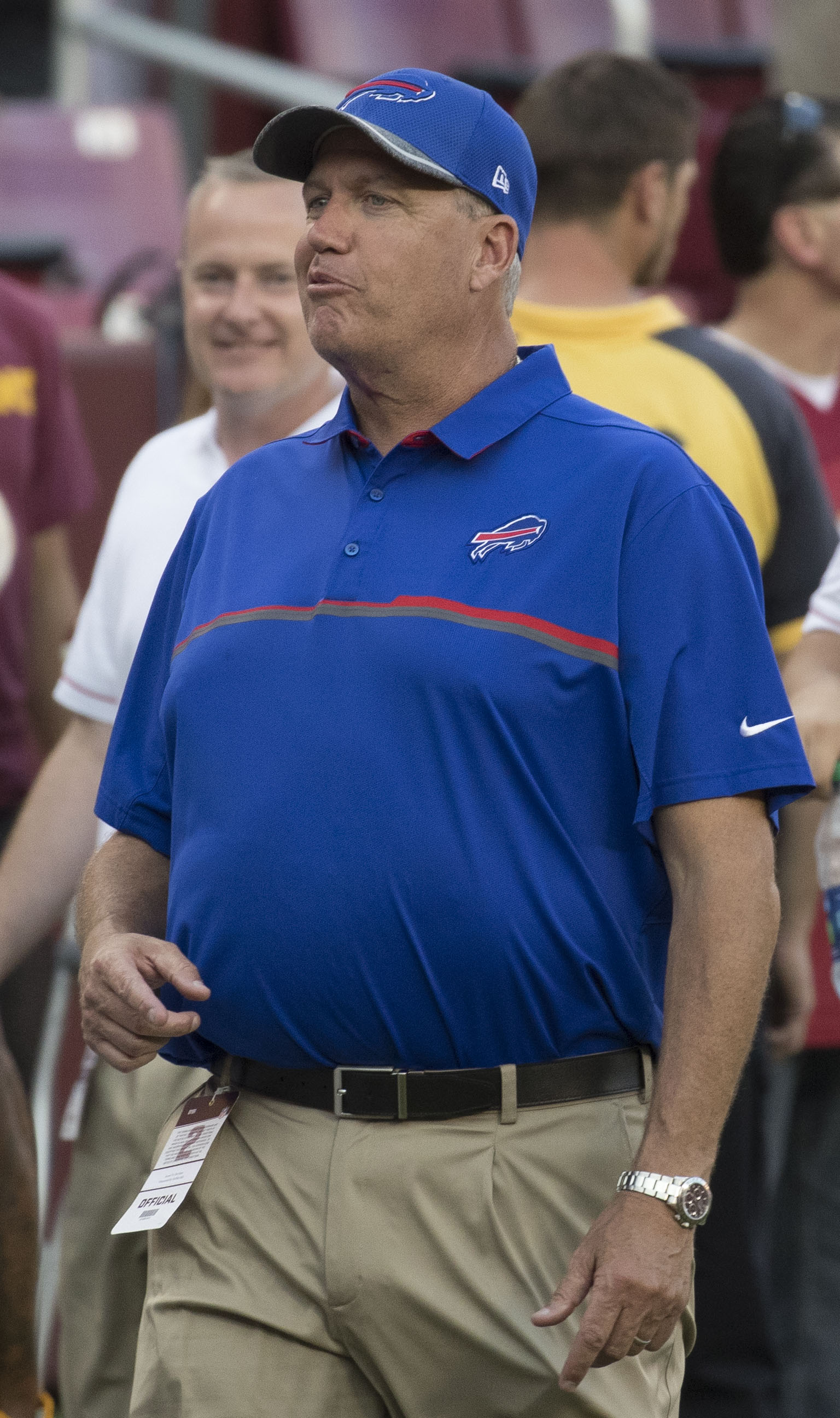
Rex Ryan

Marcus Craig

Michael Craig

The cast included Derek Xiao and Claire Rehfuss, two previous HouseGuests on season 23 of the CBS reality competition show Big Brother, as well as former Los Angeles Rams cheerleader Quinton Peron and former New York Jets and Buffalo Bills head coach Rex Ryan. CBS casting originally asked Rex Ryan to compete with his twin brother, Rob Ryan, but the latter was unable to compete due to his work obligations with the Las Vegas Raiders. Aubrey Ares and David Hernandez were not initially selected for the final cast, but received a call to compete from CBS producers two hours before The Amazing Race started production.

Contestants	Age	Relationship	Hometown	Status
Aastha Lal	33	Engaged	Marina del Rey, California	Eliminated 1st (in Munich, Germany)
Nina Duong	34	Engaged	Marina del Rey, California	Eliminated 1st (in Munich, Germany)
Tim Mann	40	Golf Buddies	Brentwood, Tennessee	Eliminated 2nd (in Innsbruck, Austria)
Rex Ryan	59	Golf Buddies	Brentwood, Tennessee	Eliminated 2nd (in Innsbruck, Austria)
Rich Kuo	32	Motivational Speakers	Huntington Beach, California	Eliminated 3rd (in Florence, Italy)
Dom Jones	35	Motivational Speakers	Huntington Beach, California	Eliminated 3rd (in Florence, Italy)
Linton Atkinson	50	Father & Daughter	Brooklyn, New York	Eliminated 4th (in Petra, Jordan)
Sharik Atkinson	23	Father & Daughter	Brooklyn, New York	Eliminated 4th (in Petra, Jordan)
Abby Garrett	24	Childhood Sweethearts	Birmingham, Alabama	Medically removed (in Amman, Jordan)
Will Freeman	25	Childhood Sweethearts	Birmingham, Alabama	Medically removed (in Amman, Jordan)
Glenda Roberts	41	Newlyweds	Norcross, Georgia	Eliminated 6th (in Domme, France)
Patrice "Lumumba" Roberts	41	Newlyweds	Norcross, Georgia	Eliminated 6th (in Domme, France)
Quinton Peron	29	Former Rams Cheerleaders	Pasadena, California	Eliminated 7th (in Toulouse, France)
Madison "Mattie" Lynch	27	Former Rams Cheerleaders	Vista, California	Eliminated 7th (in Toulouse, France)
Marcus Craig	38	Military Brothers	Richmond Hill, Georgia	Eliminated 8th (in Ronda, Spain)
Michael Craig	30	Military Brothers	Alamogordo, New Mexico	Eliminated 8th (in Ronda, Spain)
Aubrey Ares	29	Ballroom Dancers	Los Angeles, California	Eliminated 9th (in Hrunamannahreppur, Iceland)
David Hernandez	29	Ballroom Dancers	Los Angeles, California	Eliminated 9th (in Hrunamannahreppur, Iceland)
Luis Colon	34	Married	Miami, Florida	Third place
Michelle Burgos	34	Married	Miami, Florida	Third place
Emily Bushnell	36	Long-Lost Twins	Ardmore, Pennsylvania	Runners-up
Molly Sinert	36	Long-Lost Twins	Palm Beach Gardens, Florida	Runners-up
Derek Xiao	25	Reality Romance	Los Angeles, California	Winners
Claire Rehfuss	26	Reality Romance	Los Angeles, California	Winners

Future appearances

Derek Xiao and Claire Rehfuss appeared as clue givers during the first Roadblock of season 35.

In 2023, Luis Colon competed on the second season of The Challenge: USA.

== Contestant progress ==
The following teams are listed with their placements in each leg. Placements are listed in finishing order.

- A red placement with a dagger (†) indicates that the team was eliminated.
- An italicized placement indicates a team's placement at the midpoint of a Mega Leg.

Team placement (by leg)
Team	1	2	3a (Note: This was a Mega Leg with two Roadblocks and two Detours shown over two episodes. The placements listed for the first half are the order of the teams' completion of the first Roadblock in Bologna.)	3b	4	5	6	7	8a (Note: This was a Mega Leg with two Roadblocks and two Detours shown over two episodes. The placements listed for the first half are the order of the teams' completion of the first Detour in Málaga.)	8b	9	10
Derek & Claire	1st	4th	6th	7th	2nd	4th	3rd	1st	1st	3rd	1st	1st
Emily & Molly	5th	7th	2nd	1st	5th	6th	2nd	3rd	4th	4th	3rd	2nd
Luis & Michelle	10th	5th	4th	4th	1st	1st	4th	2nd	3rd	1st	2nd	3rd
Aubrey & David	11th	8th	3rd	6th	8th	2nd	6th	5th	2nd	2nd	4th†	
Marcus & Michael	6th	1st	1st	2nd	3rd	5th	1st	4th	5th	5th†		
Quinton & Mattie	3rd	10th	8th	5th	6th	3rd	5th	6th†				
Glenda & Lumumba	2nd	2nd	10th	8th	7th	7th (Note: Glenda & Lumumba arrived last at the Pit Stop, but were not eliminated because Abby & Will had already been removed from the race.)	7th†					
Abby & Will	8th	6th	7th	3rd	4th	† (Note: Abby & Will were removed from the race prior to fifth leg after Will tested positive for COVID-19.)						
Linton & Sharik	4th	3rd	5th	9th	9th†							
Rich & Dom	9th	9th (Note: Rich & Dom initially arrived 8th, but had to go back and retrieve a hat that they had left in their car. Aubrey & David checked in during this time, dropping Rich & Dom to 9th.)	9th	10th†								
Tim & Rex	7th	11th†										
Aastha & Nina	12th†											

== Race summary ==
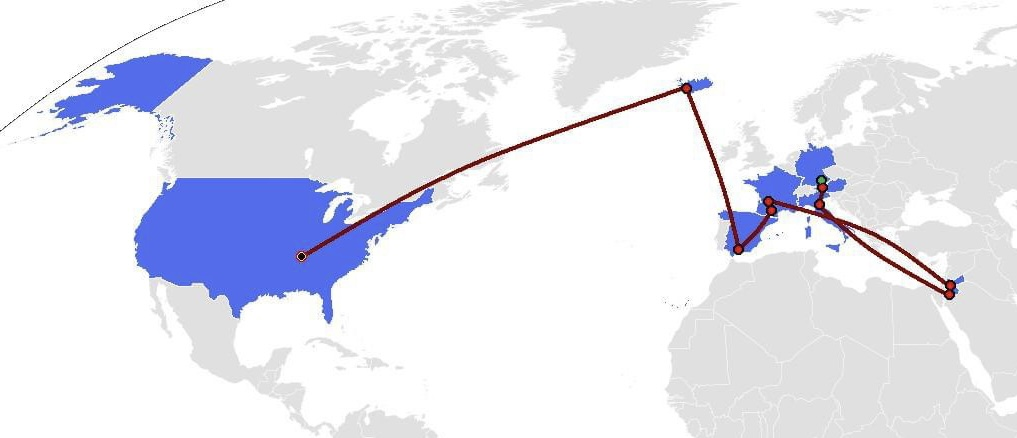
The route of The Amazing Race 34.

Destinations	Air travel Rail travel Water travel Bus travel Helicopter travel Bicycle travel Gondola travel
Route Markers	Detour Roadblock Scramble Pit Stop

=== Leg 1 (Germany) ===
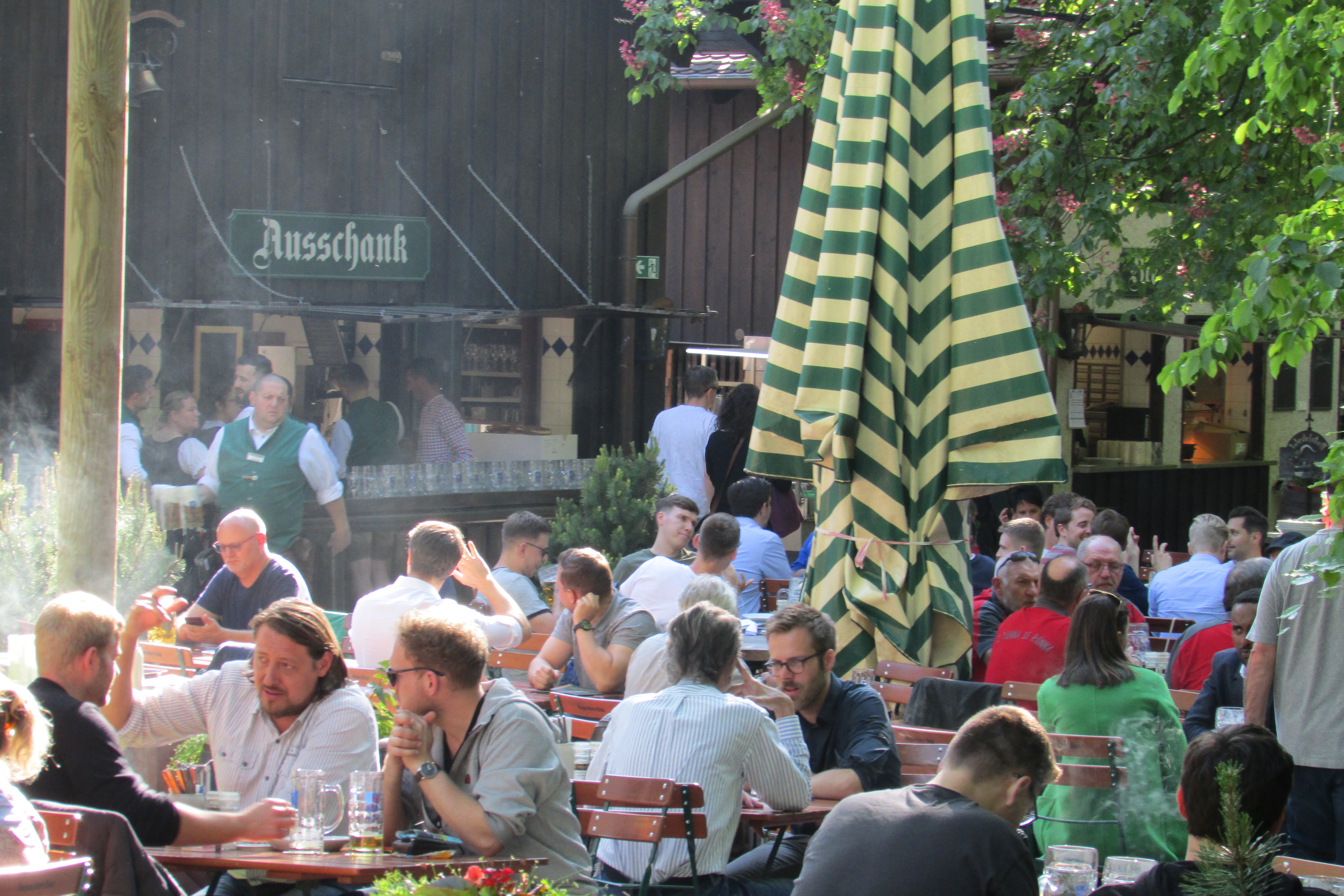
Teams encountered their first Roadblock at Augustiner-Keller, the oldest beer garden in Munich.

- Episode 1: "Many Firsts But Don't Be Last" (September 21, 2022)
- Prize: US$2,500 each (awarded to Derek and Claire)
- Eliminated: Aastha and Nina

Locations

- Munich, Germany (Nymphenburg Palace) (Starting Line)
  - Munich (Luitpoldpark)
  - Munich (Englischer Garten – Seehaus Biergarten)
  - Munich (Augustiner-Keller Biergarten)
- Munich (Friedensengel )

Episode summary

- Teams began at the Nymphenburg Palace in Munich, Germany, and encountered the series' first Scramble, where they had to complete each of the following Oktoberfest-inspired tasks in any order so as to get three parts of a clue which, when assembled, directed them to the Pit Stop.
  - For the task at Luitpoldpark entitled Roll, teams had to roll a beer keg through an obstacle course within 55 seconds to receive a puzzle piece. If teams were unsuccessful, they had to wait out a two-minute penalty before making another attempt.
  - For the task at the Seehaus Biergarten entitled Saw, teams had to use a two-man saw to saw completely through a log to the beat of Bavarian music to receive a puzzle piece.
  - For the season's first Roadblock at the Augustiner-Keller Biergarten entitled Smash, one team member had to use provided tools to free a puzzle piece from an ice block.
- The three puzzle pieces fit together to form the shape of the Friedensengel and the written instructions directed teams to the Pit Stop there.

Additional notes

- Before the race began, teams rode a log raft down the Isar and through the Mühltal hydroelectric power station.
- This leg was announced as The Amazing Race's 400th leg.

=== Leg 2 (Germany → Austria) ===
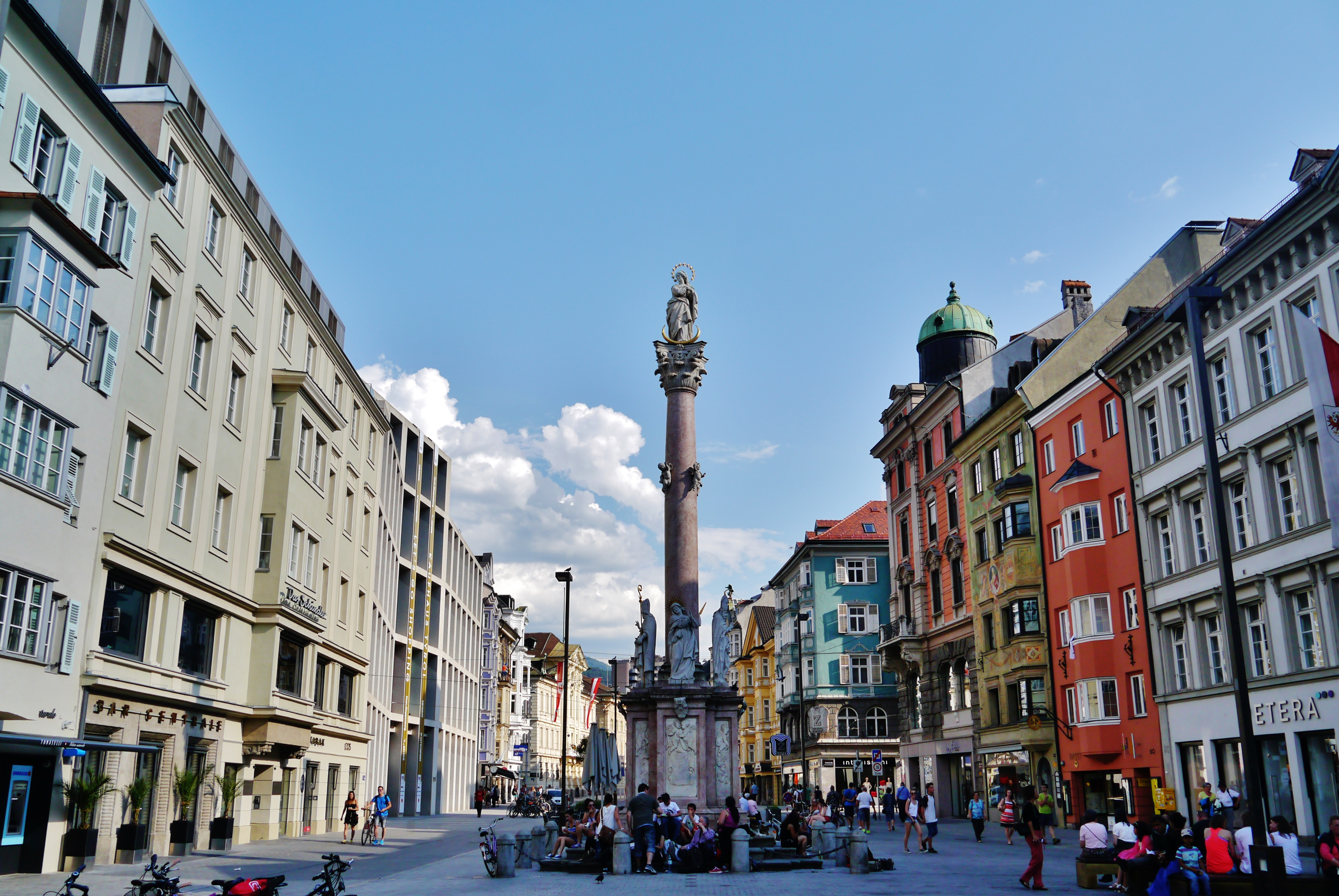
Teams had to perform a wedding dance by the Annasäule in Innsbruck.

- Episode 2: "Patience, Is the New Me" (September 28, 2022)
- Prize: Reward points for a five-night trip for two to Lima, Peru, and Machu Picchu (awarded to Marcus and Michael)
- Eliminated: Tim and Rex

Locations

- Munich (Friedensengel )
- Patsch, Austria (Grünwalderhof)
- Innsbruck (Marktplatz)
- Innsbruck (Stiftskeller or Annasäule)
- Innsbruck (Hofburg Imperial Palace)

Episode summary

- At the start of this leg, teams departed from the Friedensengel in groups 15 minutes apart based on the order of their arrival at the previous Pit Stop, and had to drive to Grünwalderhof in Patsch, Austria, which had their next clue.
- In this leg's Roadblock, one team member had to correctly sing three Alpine yodels to receive their next clue. Before beginning this task, both team members had to don traditional Austrian costumes, which they had to wear for the rest of the leg.
- After the Roadblock, teams drove to the Marktplatz in Innsbruck and found their next clue.
- This season's first Detour was a choice between Bells Ringin' or Partners Swingin'. In Bells Ringin', teams had to use Tyrolean bells to play an Austrian folk song called "Tiroler Glockenklang" to receive their next clue. In Partners Swingin', teams had to correctly perform an Austrian wedding dance to receive their next clue.
- After the Detour, teams had to check in at the Pit Stop: Hofburg Imperial Palace.

=== Leg 3 (Austria → Germany → Italy) ===
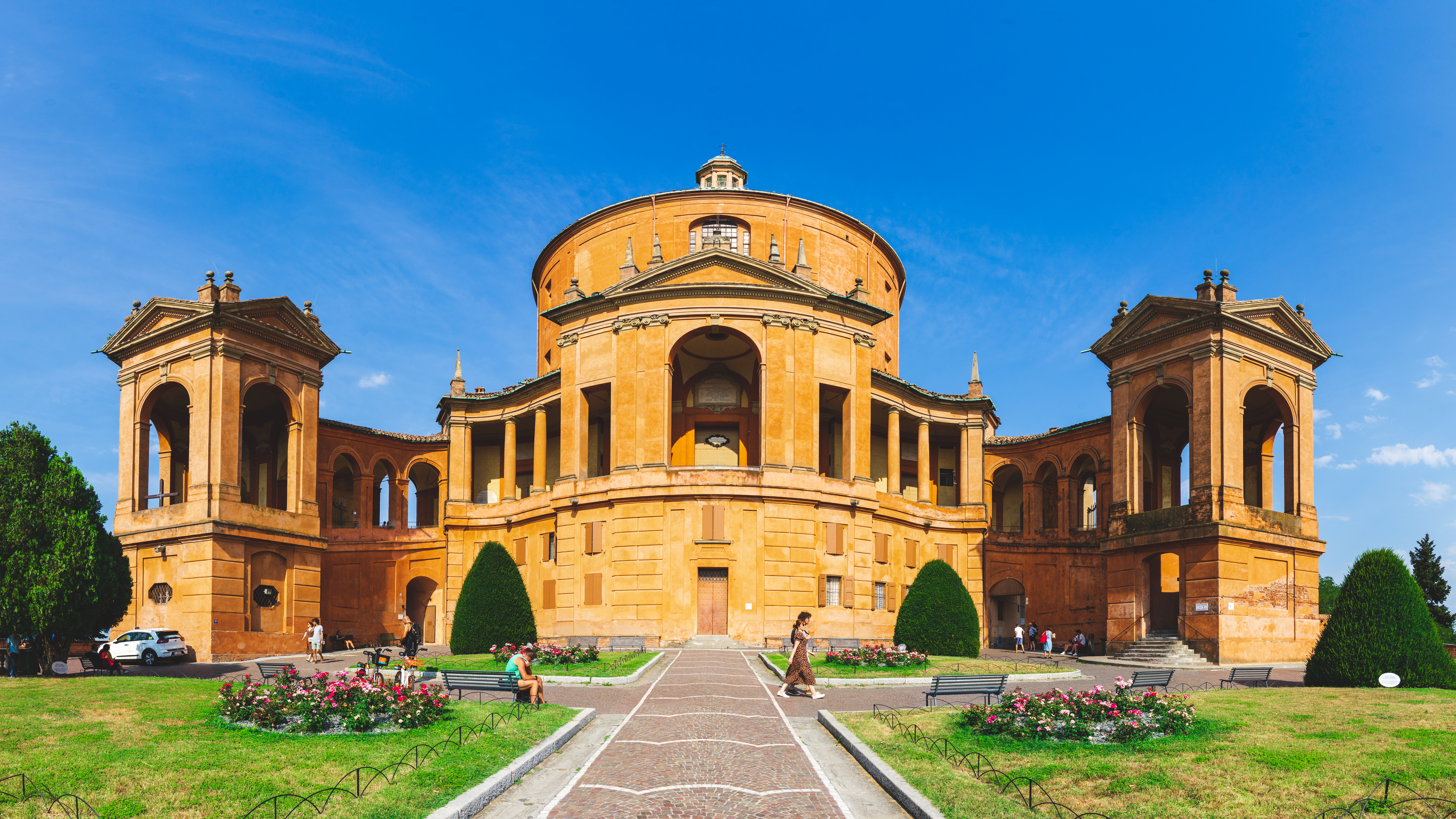
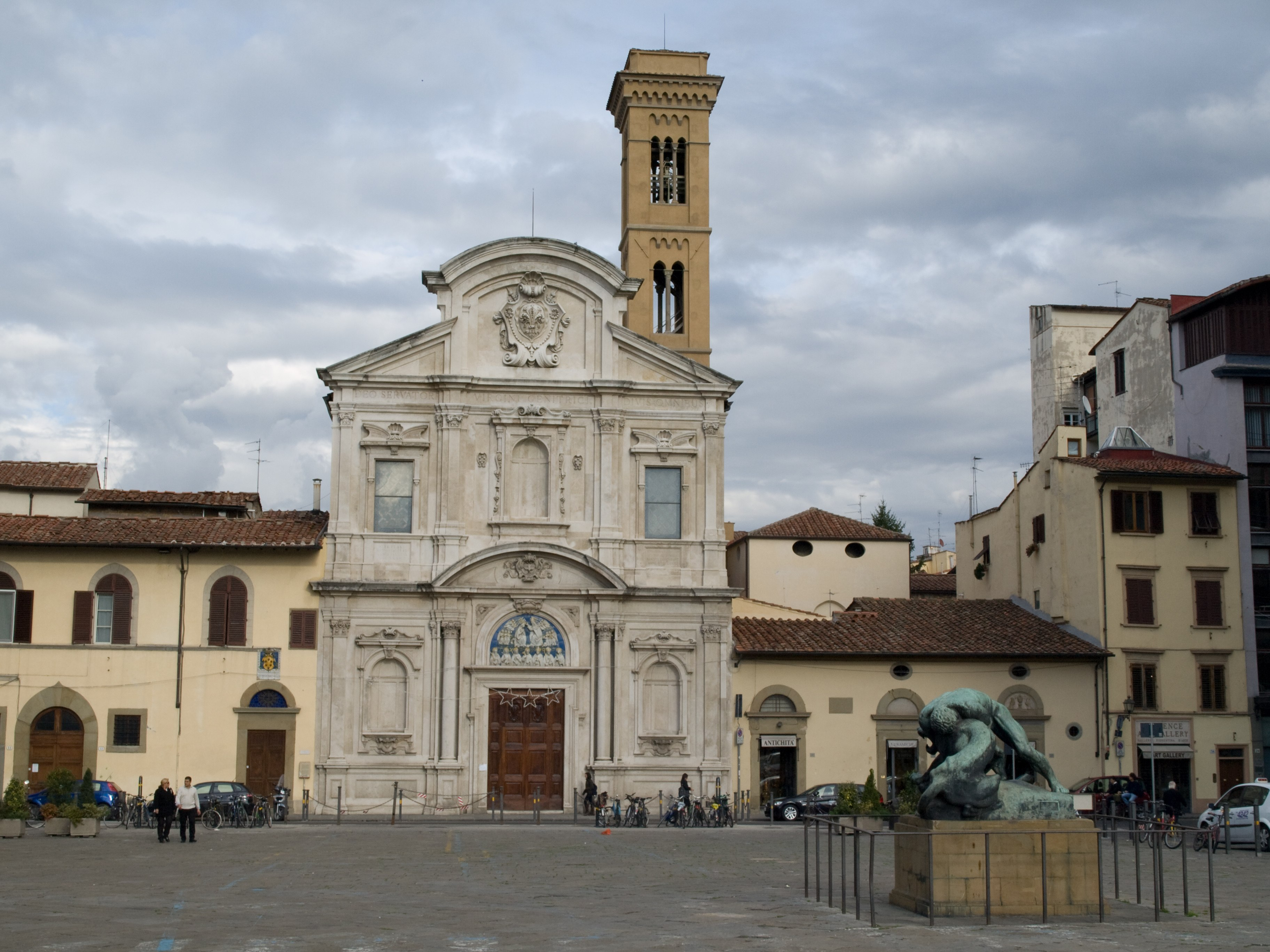
Teams began their Mega Leg in Italy at the Sanctuary of the Madonna di San Luca in Bologna and concluded at the Piazza Ognissanti in Florence.
- Episode 3: "It's All in the Details" (October 5, 2022) & Episode 4: "Everyone's an Artist" (October 12, 2022)
- Prize: Reward points for a five-night trip for two to Sydney, Australia, the Blue Mountains, and Hunter Valley (awarded to Emily and Molly)
- Eliminated: Rich and Dom

Locations

- Munich, Germany → Bologna, Italy
- Bologna (Sanctuary of the Madonna di San Luca)
- Bologna (Arco del Meloncello)
- Bologna (University of Bologna – Teatro Anatomico or Formaggeria Barbieri, Ristorante Diana & Osteria del Cappello)
- Bologna (Ducati Factory)
- Florence (Villa Bardini)
- Florence (Piazza della Repubblica, Piazza del Duomo, Piazza della Signoria & Trattoria Ponte Vecchio or Osteria Belle Donne, Il Latini, Vivoli Gelato & Trattoria Ponte Vecchio)
- Florence (Piazza Ognissanti)

Episode summary (Episode 3)

- During the Pit Stop, teams were flown to Bologna, Italy, and began the next leg at the Sanctuary of the Madonna di San Luca. Teams departed in groups 15 minutes apart based on the order of their arrival at the previous Pit Stop and had to drive to the Arco del Meloncello for their next clue.
- This leg's first Detour was a choice between Head of the Class or The Big Cheese. In Head of the Class, teams had to listen to an anatomy lecture from a sixteenth century instructor and then take an exam where they had to identify bones, muscles, and organs within 90 seconds to receive their next clue. In The Big Cheese, teams had to use a cart to transport an 88-pound (40 kg) wheel of Parmesan to the Ristorante Diana, where a professional cheese cutter sliced it in half. Teams then had to deliver a cheese half to Ristorante Diana and Osteria del Cappello, collect a receipt at each restaurant, and then exchange the receipts at the formaggeria for their next clue.
- After the first Detour, teams had to drive to the Ducati Factory, where they found their next clue.
- In this leg's first Roadblock, one team member had to attach wheels, brakes, and body panels to a Ducati Panigale V4 to receive their next clue.

Episode summary (Episode 4)

- After the first Roadblock, teams had to drive to Florence and find their next clue at the Villa Bardini.
- In this leg's second Roadblock, one team member had to use the provided tools to remove plaster surrounding a sculpture to receive their next clue.
- This leg's second Detour was a choice between Eye for Fashion or Window of Opportunity. In Eye for Fashion, teams had to find three fashion shoots taking place around the city, study the outfits, and then match outfit sketches with the pictures of the locations of the shoots to receive their next clue. In Window of Opportunity, teams had to find three wine windows, pick up Tuscan soup, cured meats, and biscotti, and then deliver them to an outdoor trattoria to receive their next clue.
- After the second Detour, teams had to check in at the Pit Stop: Piazza Ognissanti.

Additional note

- Leg 3 was a Mega Leg spread out over two episodes.

=== Leg 4 (Italy → Jordan) ===
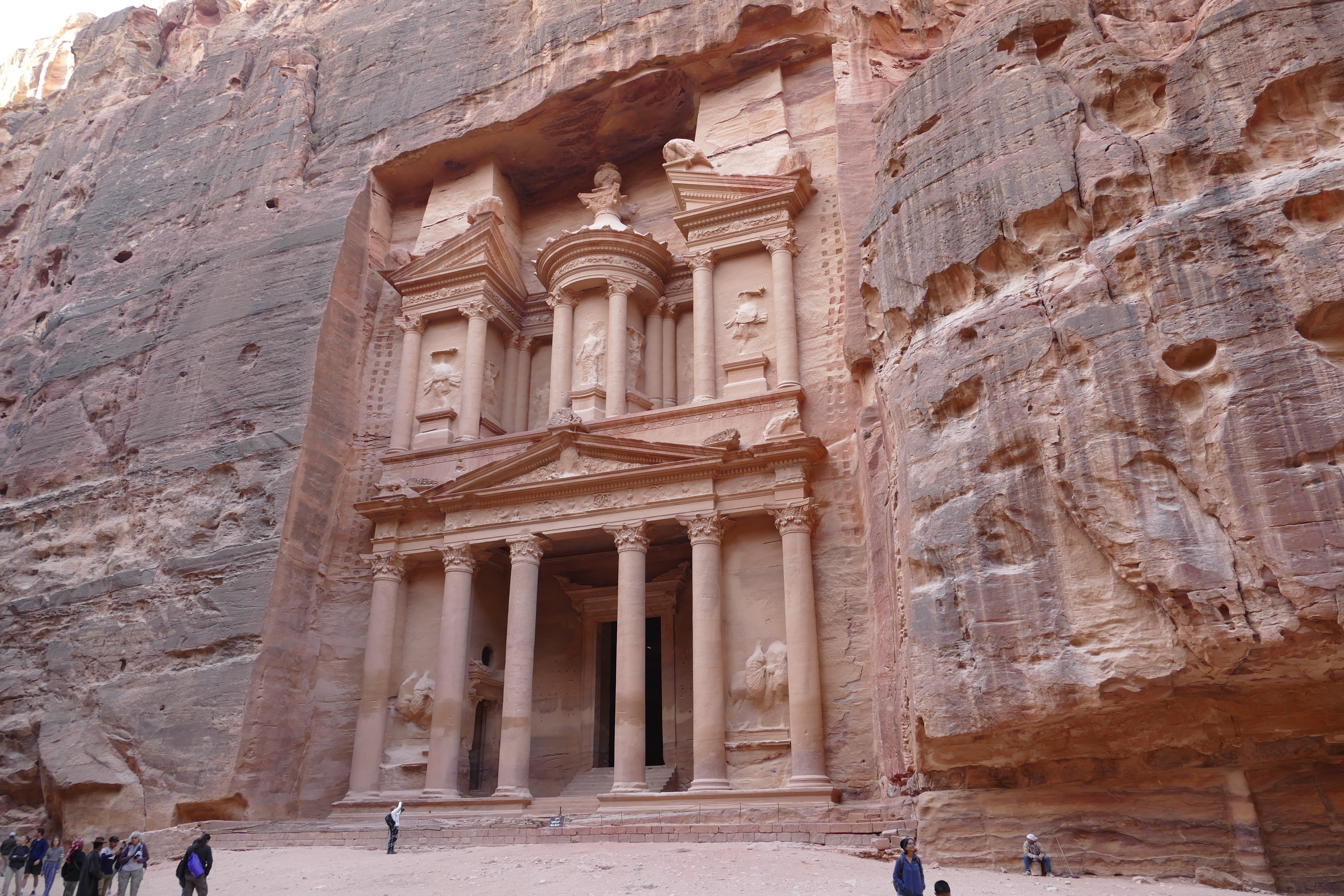
While in Jordan, teams visited Al-Khazneh in the ancient city of Petra.

- Episode 5: "The Amazing Race of Arabia" (October 19, 2022)
- Prize: US$5,000 each (awarded to Luis and Michelle)
- Eliminated: Linton and Sharik

Locations

- Bologna → Aqaba, Jordan
- Rashidiyah (Wadi Rum Train Station) → Ad Disah (Hedjaz Jordan Railway)
- Aqaba Governorate (Wadi Rum Desert)
- Petra (Al-Khazneh)
- Petra (Palace Tomb)
- Petra (Great Temple)

Episode summary

- During the Pit Stop, teams were flown to Aqaba, Jordan. Once there, teams boarded an Ottoman Empire-era steam train that took them into the desert, where they watched a scene reminiscent of Lawrence of Arabia before receiving their next clue. Teams then departed in groups 15 minutes apart based on the order of their arrival at the previous Pit Stop, and were driven by a bedouin to their next clue in the Wadi Rum Desert.
- In this leg's Roadblock, one team member had to use a metal detector to search a movie set for a piece of "spaceship debris" that identified the location of their next clue: Petra.
- After the Roadblock, teams were driven to Petra and found their next clue outside Al-Khazneh.
- This leg's Detour was a choice between Camel Caravan or Palace Puzzle. In Camel Caravan, teams had to carry four bags of hay and water from a cistern to camels at a market to receive their next clue. In Palace Puzzle, teams had to complete a slide puzzle of the Palace Tomb to receive their next clue.
- After the Detour, teams had to check in at the Pit Stop: the Great Temple.

=== Leg 5 (Jordan) ===
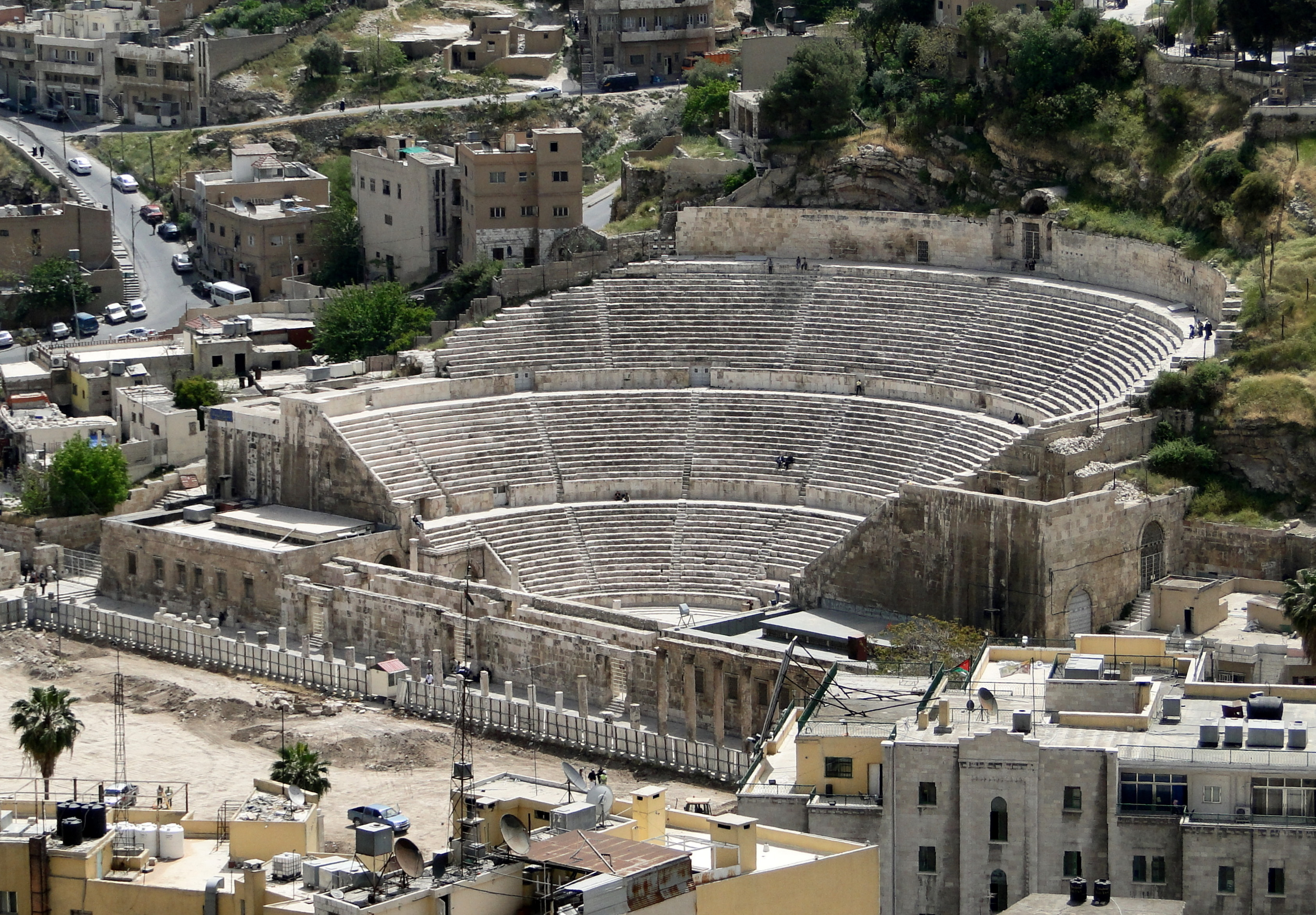
One Detour option in Amman was located at the centuries-old Roman Theater.

- Episode 6: "Step By Step" (October 26, 2022)
- Prize: Reward points for a five-night trip for two to Barcelona, Spain (awarded to Luis and Michelle)
- Medically removed: Abby and Will

Locations

- Amman (Amman Citadel)
- Amman (Maktabat Khizanat al-Jahith Bookstore)
- Amman (Roman Theater or Odeon Theater)
- Amman (Al-Hashemi Street Park)
- Amman (Nymphaeum)

Episode summary

- At the start of this leg, Phil Keoghan announced that Abby and Will had received a positive COVID-19 test and were therefore eliminated from The Amazing Race. Phil also announced that there would be no additional elimination at the end of this leg, but the team that finished last in this leg would be the only ones in the last departure group during the next leg. Teams then departed simultaneously from the Amman Citadel and traveled on foot to the Maktabat Khizanat al-Jahith Bookstore, where they found their next clue.
- This leg's Detour was a choice between Step By Step or Letter By Letter. In Step By Step, teams had to perform a Jordanian dance at the Roman Theater to receive their next clue. In Letter By Letter, teams had to memorize and recite the 28 letters of the Arabic alphabet at the Odeon Theater to receive their next clue.
- In this leg's Roadblock, one team member had to assemble a cart called an earaba to receive their next clue.
- After the Roadblock, teams had to bring their earaba to the Pit Stop: the Nymphaeum.

=== Leg 6 (Jordan → France) ===
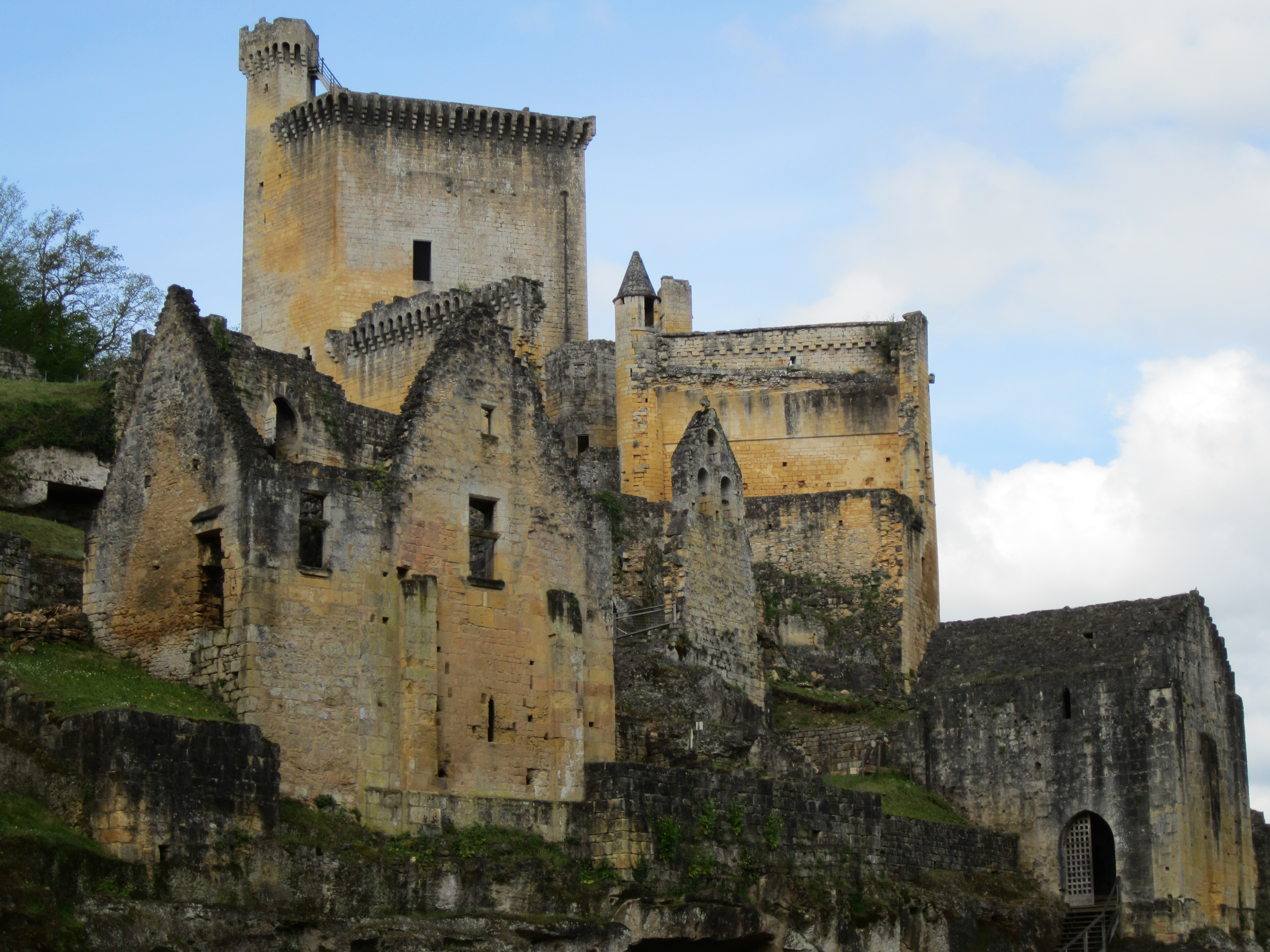
During this leg in Dordogne, the land of 1,001 castles, racers rappelled down one of them: the Château de Commarque.

- Episode 7: "It's Simply Medieval" (November 2, 2022)
- Prize: US$7,500 each (awarded to Marcus and Michael)
- Eliminated: Glenda and Lumumba

Locations

- Amman → Toulouse, France
- Beynac-et-Cazenac (Château de Beynac)
- Les Eyzies (Château de Commarque)
- Domme (La Ferme de Turnac)
- Domme (Panorama)

Episode summary

- During the Pit Stop, teams were flown to Toulouse, France, and began the next leg at the Château de Beynac. Teams departed in groups 15 minutes apart based on the order of their arrival at the previous Pit Stop, and had to drive to the Château de Commarque to find their next clue.
- In this leg's Roadblock, one team member had to study the Commarque family tree, rappel 131 feet (40 m) down an exterior wall of the Château de Commarque, and then match five names to their family crests to receive their next clue.
- After the Roadblock, teams had to drive to La Ferme de Turnac in Domme, where they found their next clue.
- This leg's Detour was a choice between Walnut Cracker or Medieval Gamer. In Walnut Cracker, teams had to crack and press walnuts until they produced enough walnut oil to fill a container, after which they received their next clue. In Medieval Gamer, teams had to complete three medieval games to receive their next clue.
- After the Detour, teams had to check in at the Pit Stop: the Panorama in Domme.

=== Leg 7 (France) ===
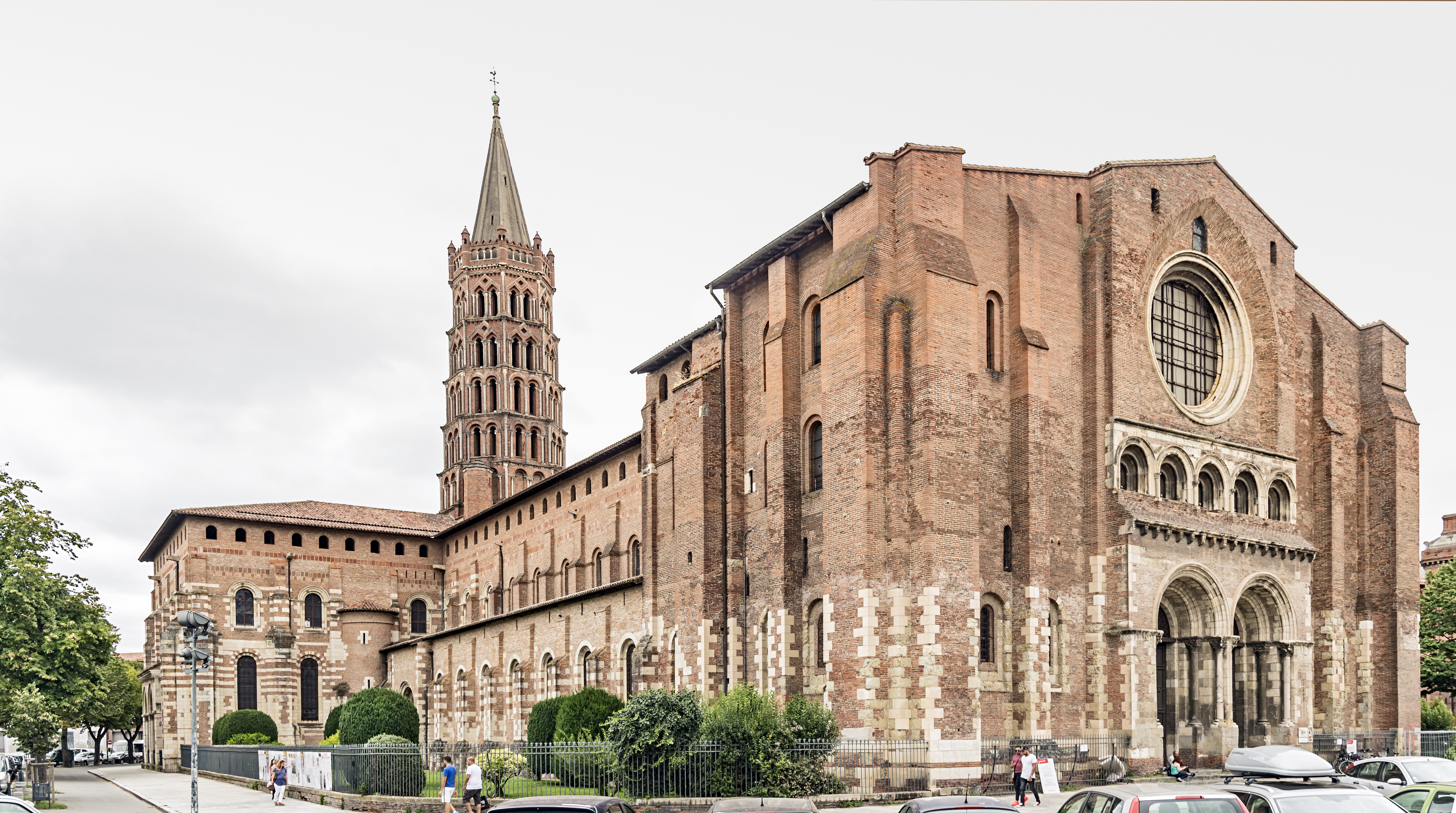
Outside the Basilica of Saint-Sernin in Toulouse, teams had to recite French poetry.

- Episode 8: "La Ville Rose" (November 9, 2022)
- Prize: Reward points for a five-night trip for two to Bangkok, Thailand (awarded to Derek and Claire)
- Eliminated: Quinton and Mattie

Locations

- Domme (Panorama)
- Toulouse (Stade Toulousain)
- Toulouse (Couvent des Jacobins)
- Toulouse (Place Saint-Sernin or Promenade du Docteur Charles Rose)
- Toulouse (Canal de Brienne – Pays d'Oc)

Episode summary

- At the start of this leg, teams departed from the Panorama in Domme in groups 15 minutes apart based on the order of their arrival at the previous Pit Stop, and had to drive to Stade Toulousain in Toulouse, where they found their next clue.
- In this leg's Roadblock, one team member had to perform a rugby training drill and then complete a drop kick to receive their next clue.
- After the Roadblock, teams had to drive to the Couvent des Jacobins and find a musician playing a French horn, who had their next clue.
- This leg's Detour was a choice between Say Six or Lay Bricks. In Say Six, teams had to find three poets, who each displayed and recited two verses of the poem "Demain dès l'aube" by Victor Hugo. Teams then had to recite the six verses to a judge to receive their next clue. In Lay Bricks, teams had to arrange bricks so as to recreate a sidewalk pattern and receive their next clue.
- After the Detour, teams had to check in at the Pit Stop: the Pays d'Oc on the Canal de Brienne.

=== Leg 8 (France → Spain) ===
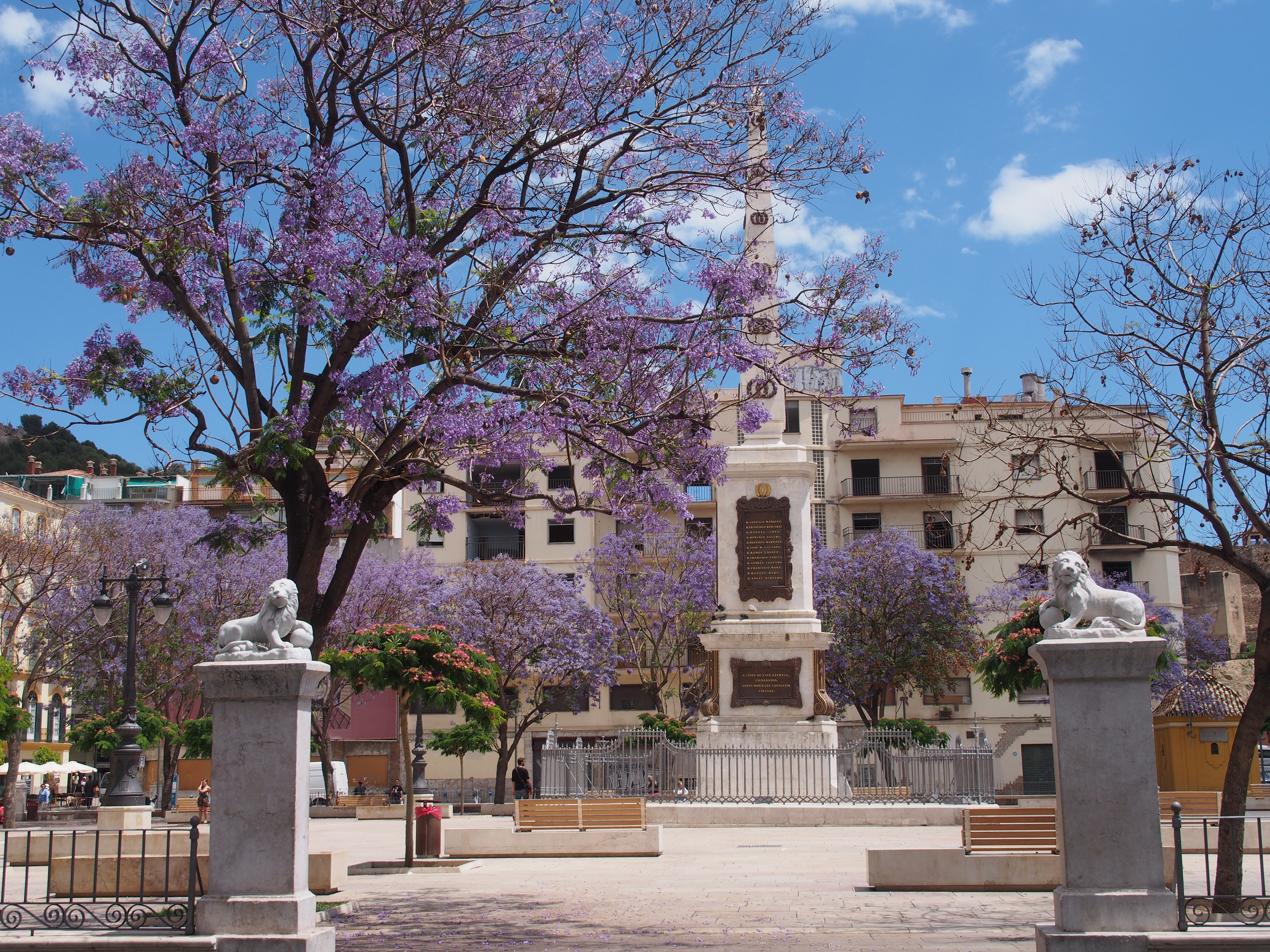
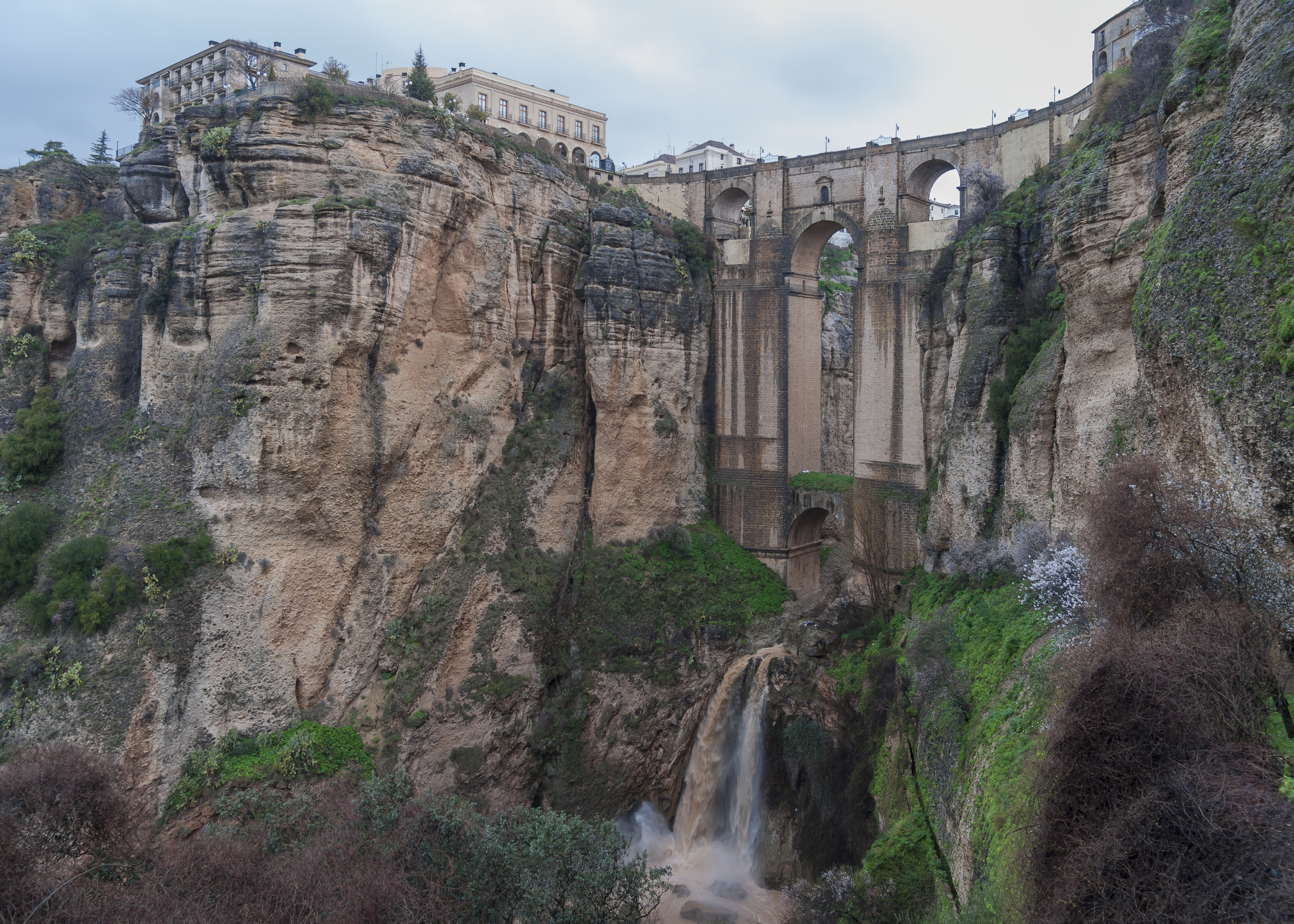
The Roadblocks in Spain were located at Plaza de la Merced in Málaga and Puente Nuevo in Ronda.
- Episode 9: "Vamos a la Playa" (November 16, 2022) & Episode 10: "Don't Look Down" (November 23, 2022)
- Prize: Reward points for a five-night trip for two to Tokyo, Japan (awarded to Luis and Michelle)
- Eliminated: Marcus and Michael

Locations

- Toulouse → Málaga, Spain
- Málaga (Castillo de Gibralfaro)
- Málaga (Plaza de la Merced)
- Málaga (Málaga Cathedral → Port of Málaga – El Cubo)
- Málaga (Playa El Palo)
- Ronda (Puente Nuevo)
- Ronda (Arab Baths or El Casino & Hispania Flamenco)
- Ronda (Paseo de Kazunori Yamauchi)
- Ronda (Puente Nuevo)
- Ronda (Mirador de Ronda)

Episode summary (Episode 9)

- During the Pit Stop, teams were flown to Málaga, Spain, and began the next leg at the Castillo de Gibralfaro. Teams departed in groups 15 minutes apart based on the order of their arrival at the previous Pit Stop, and had to travel on foot to Plaza de la Merced to find their next clue.
- In this leg's first Roadblock, one team member had to arrange six glass panels so as to recreate Pablo Picasso's Three Musicians and receive their next clue.
- After the first Roadblock, teams had to travel by bicycle from the Málaga Cathedral to El Cubo, where they found their next clue.
- This leg's first Detour was a choice between Fish Fry or Sailboat Supply. For both tasks, teams had to travel by bicycle to Playa El Palo. In Fish Fry, teams had to skewer and roast 18 sardines to create a local dish called espetos and receive their next clue. In Sailboat Supply, teams had to inflate a standup paddleboard and then deliver life vests and a cooler filled with ice to a yacht anchored offshore to receive their next clue.
- After the first Detour, teams received a postcard depicting a particular view of their next location, which they had to figure out was the Puente Nuevo in Ronda.

Episode summary (Episode 10)

- After driving to Ronda, teams had to find a tour guide holding the flag of Andalusia, who had their next clue.
- This season's final Detour was a choice between Bend over Backwards or Dress for Success. In Bend over Backwards, teams had to assemble a Moorish brick arch to receive their next clue. In Dress for Success, teams had to accessorize a flamenco dancer so that she matched an onstage performer to receive their next clue.
- After the second Detour, teams had to find a woodcarver with their next clue on the Paseo de Kazunori Yamauchi.
- In this leg's second Roadblock, one team member had to walk across a tightrope suspended 300 feet (91 m) above the El Tajo gorge and strung beneath the Puente Nuevo, select the clue marked with the flag of Andalusia, and then return across the tightrope to their partner.
- The final clue of the leg instructed teams to find the Pit Stop "in between Ernest and Orson", and teams had to figure out that they needed to find Mirador de Ronda and the monuments to both Ernest Hemingway and Orson Welles.

Additional note

- Leg 8 was a Mega Leg spread out over two episodes.

=== Leg 9 (Spain → Iceland) ===
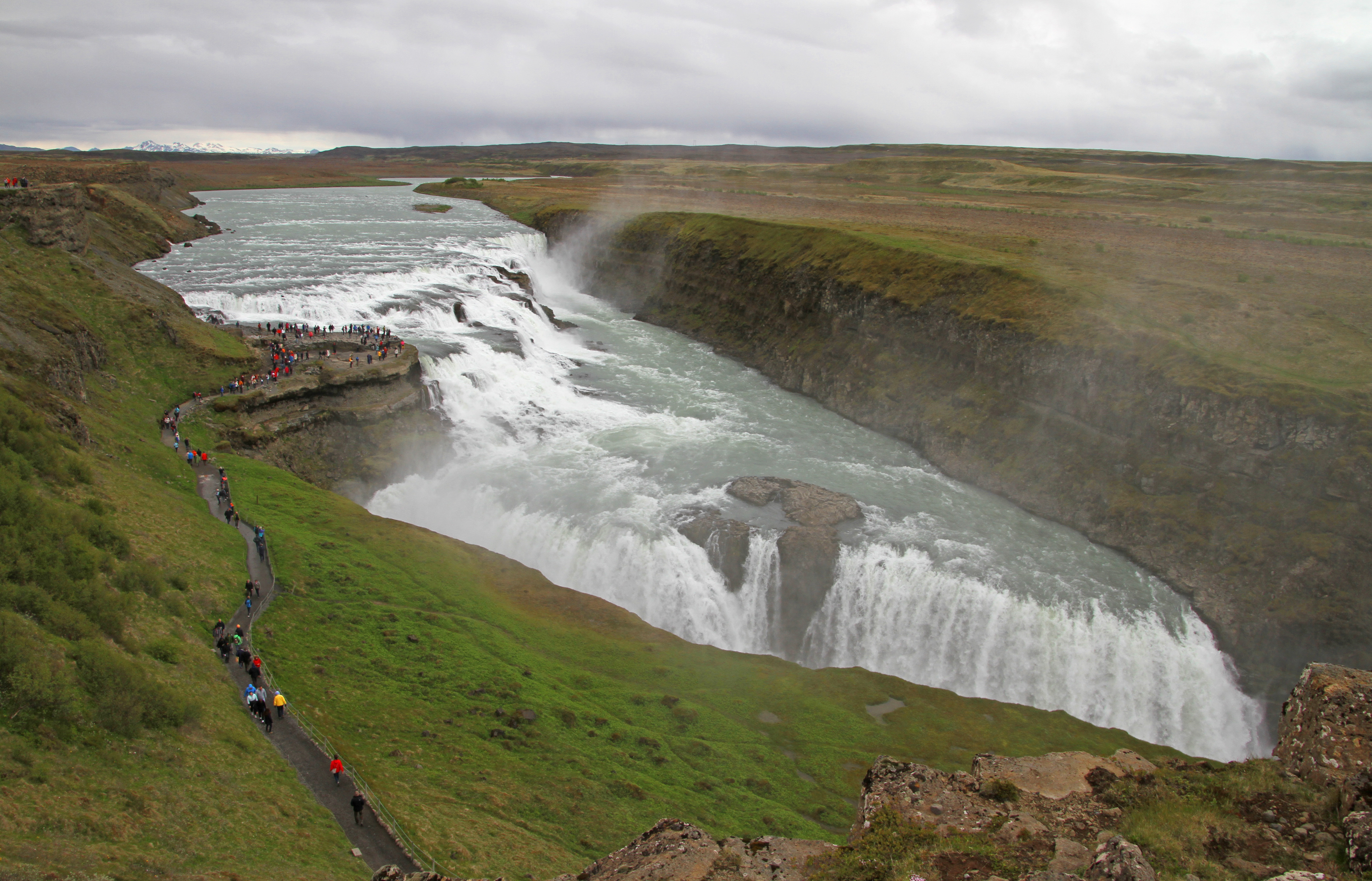
The penultimate leg concluded at the Icelandic waterfall Gullfoss.

- Episode 11: "How Am I Going to Survive This?" (November 30, 2022)
- Prize: Reward points for a five-night trip for two to London, England, and Stonehenge (awarded to Derek and Claire)
- Eliminated: Aubrey and David

Locations

- Málaga → Reykjavík, Iceland
- Skógar (Skógafoss) → Mýrdalshreppur (Sólheimajökull)
- Fljótshlíð (Fljótshlíðarfoss)
- Thingvellir National Park (Silfra Fissure)
- Hrunamannahreppur (Gullfoss)

Episode summary

- During the Pit Stop, teams were flown to Reykjavík, Iceland. Teams then traveled by helicopter to the Sólheimajökull Glacier and began the leg in groups 15 minutes apart based on the order of their arrival at the previous Pit Stop. There, both team members had to climb the glacier and retrieve the flag of Iceland – – to receive their next clue. Teams then had to drive to the Fljótshlíðarfoss, where they found their next clue.
- In this leg's Roadblock, one team member had to rappel 100 feet (30 m) into a cave, retrieve their next clue, and then navigate down a river through a canyoneering course to reunite with their partner.
- After the Roadblock, teams had to drive to the Silfra Fissure, don snorkeling gear, memorize fourteen Icelandic volcanoes and their years of eruption while swimming in the fissure, and then match the names of the volcanoes with the correct year of eruption. When teams were correct, a volcanologist revealed the location of the Pit Stop: the Gullfoss waterfall.

Additional note

- Icelandic-American actor Ólafur Darri Ólafsson appeared as the Pit Stop greeter in this leg.

=== Leg 10 (Iceland → United States) ===
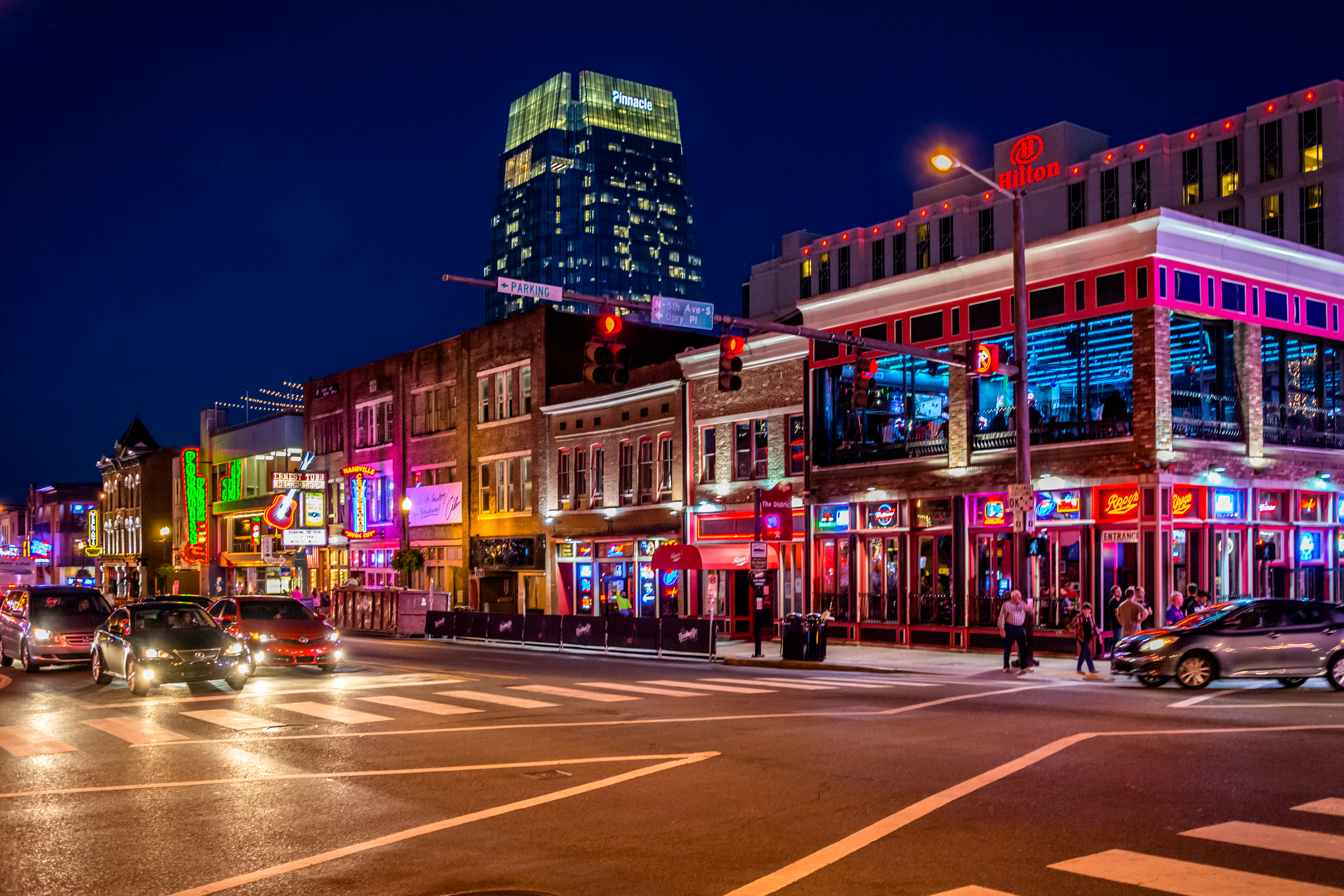
Teams traveled to Nashville, Tennessee, for the final leg of The Amazing Race 34.

- Episode 12: "The Only Leg That Matters" (December 7, 2022)
- Prize: US$1,000,000
- Winners: Derek and Claire
- Runners-up: Emily and Molly
- Third place: Luis and Michelle

Locations

- Reykjavík → Nashville, Tennessee
- Lynchburg (Jack Daniel's Distillery)
- Nashville (Korean War Veterans Memorial Bridge)
- Nashville (Gibson Garage)
- Nashville (Tootsie's Orchid Lounge, Whiskey Bent Saloon & Wildhorse Saloon)
- Nashville (Nashville Municipal Auditorium)
- Nashville (Ryman Auditorium)

Episode summary

- During the Pit Stop, teams were flown to Nashville, Tennessee, and began the final leg simultaneously at the Jack Daniel's Distillery. There, one team member had to properly label and tag thirty bottles of Jack Daniel's Tennessee whiskey before placing them on a conveyor belt. If the bottles were approved, the other team member had to pack them into boxes to receive their next clue, which instructed teams to drive to the Korean War Veterans Memorial Bridge.
- In this season's final Roadblock, one team member had to climb to the top of the bridge, retrieve a Gibson Garage guitar pick, and then rappel back down to their partner.
- After the Roadblock, teams had to drive to Gibson Garage and receive their next clue from season 22 and season 24 contestants Caroline Cutbirth and Jennifer Wayne, which instructed them to deliver one Gibson guitar to each of three different honky-tonks on Broadway in exchange for tickets to the Nashville Municipal Auditorium. There, teams learned that they had to press keys on a floor piano, which revealed images, until they found the eleven notes that displayed images they had seen during the previous nine legs. Teams then had to play them in chronological order within 11 seconds to receive their final clue directing them to the finish line: the "Mother Church of Country Music", which they had to figure out is the Ryman Auditorium. The correct answers were:

Correct answers
Leg	Piano note	Image
1	B4	Smash supplies
2	G♯3/A♭3	Flag of Austria
3	C♯2/D♭2	Ducati Panigale V4
3	C♯5/D♭5	Chisel Roadblock
4	D3	Al-Khazneh
5	F♯4/G♭4	Amman Citadel
6	A2	Commarque crests
7	E5	French horn player
8	F♯2/G♭2	El Cubo
8	F3	Ronda postcard
9	G4	Land Rover

== Production ==
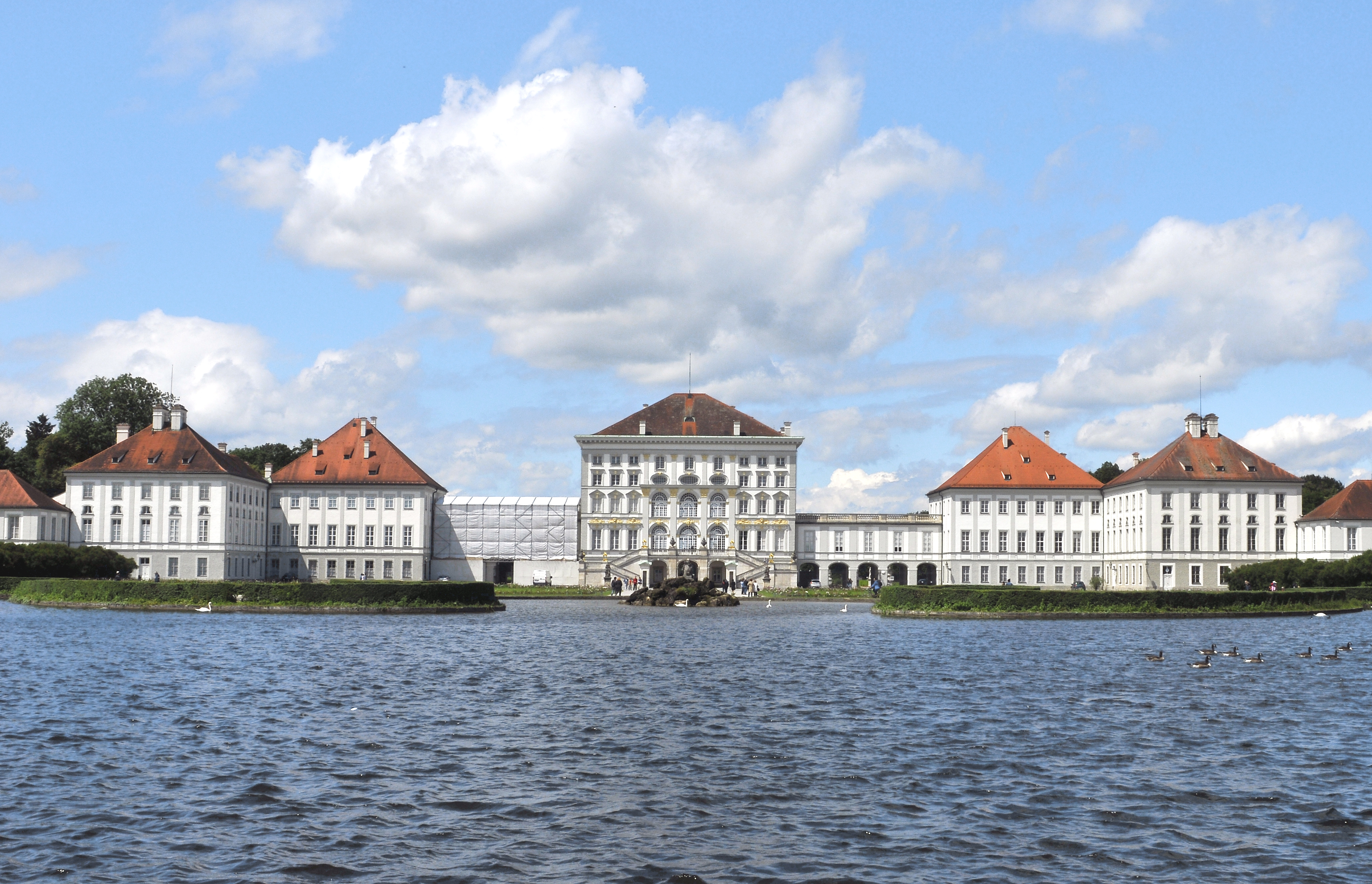
Teams began The Amazing Race 34 at the Nymphenburg Palace in Munich.

Casting opened in mid-November 2021 with prospective contestants were required to be fully vaccinated against COVID-19. Production began on May 22, 2022, with the teams and filming crew departing from Los Angeles International Airport on a chartered Titan Airways Boeing 757, so as to reduce prolonged personal interactions associated with COVID-19 infections much like in the previous season. Filming began on May 25, 2022, in Munich, Germany, making it the first time The Amazing Race started outside the United States. On May 30, tourists posted photographs online of sightings in Bologna and Florence, Italy. Teams visited Jordan for the first time in the entire franchise, racing through Petra on June 2. On June 12, racers were spotted in Ronda, Spain, and the city's tourism office announced that the show had filmed there a day later. Filming concluded in the United States, in Nashville, in mid-June.

The first leg of the season, announced as the series' 400th leg, featured "a game-changing element" called the Scramble, where the first clue that teams received at the start of the leg listed the locations of all of the tasks that they had to complete in any order. This season originally planned to exclude non-elimination legs for the first time in franchise history. However, after one team received a positive COVID-19 test before the fifth leg began and was removed from the race, the last team to arrive in the leg received the final departure time as a penalty at the beginning of the next leg.

== Release ==
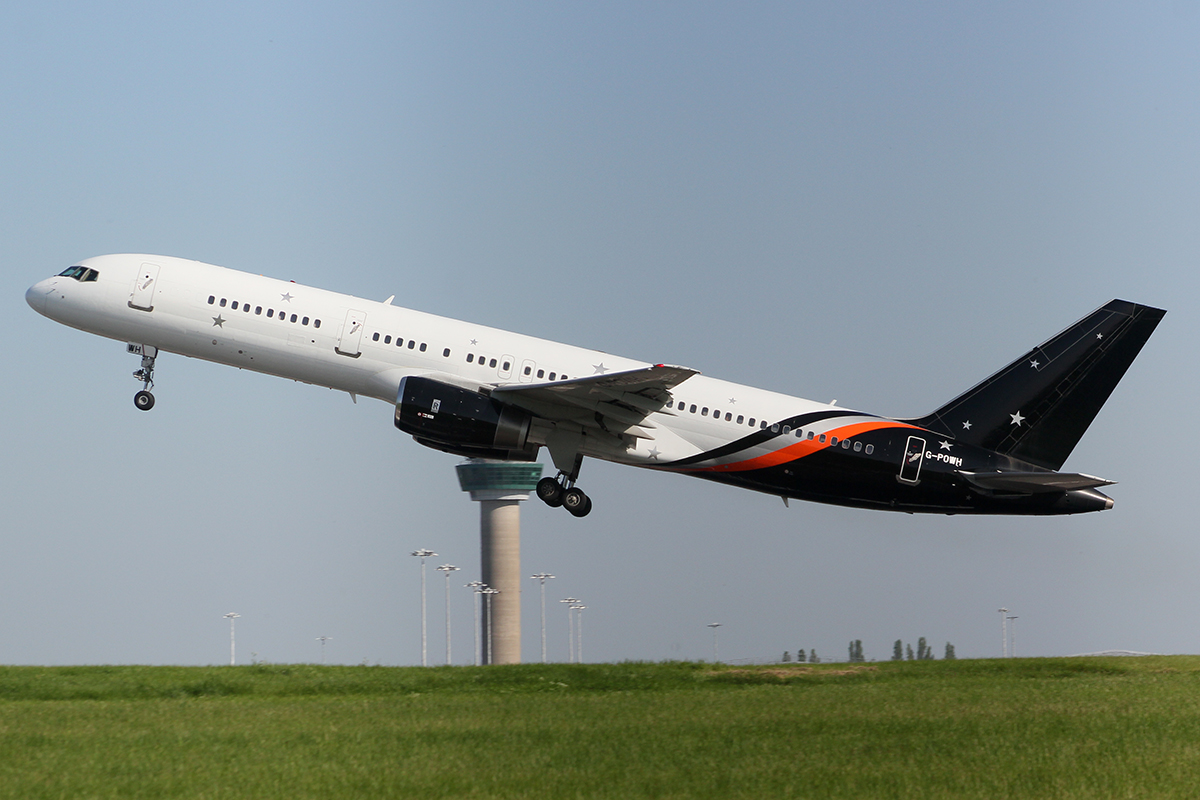
For a second season, teams traveled on a chartered plane for their flights.

On March 9, 2022, CBS renewed The Amazing Race for a thirty-fourth season set to air during the 2022–23 television season. On June 23, 2022, CBS announced that season 34 would premiere on September 28, following the premiere of the reality competition season Survivor 43. On October 5, the season began airing in the Wednesday 10:00 pm time slot, following the series Survivor and The Real Love Boat. Starting on November 2, The Amazing Race was moved forward to the 9:00 pm time slot when The Real Love Boat was shifted onto Paramount+.

Prior to the premiere, CBS News Sunday Morning aired a segment with correspondent Tracy Smith competing on the first leg with her husband. Expedia replaced Travelocity as the series' main sponsor. With the change in sponsors, the season featured one Expedia-focused leg that included a local tourism-inspired task called an Expedia Experience.

== Reception ==
The Amazing Race 34 received mixed reviews. Andy Dehnart of the reality television news site reality blurred wrote that "it's been one of the most enjoyable seasons of The Amazing Race ever, in that the teams were just so fun to watch" and that that season "was a lot of fun overall: it had some weak legs and repetition, but also some exceptional challenges." Mark Blankenship of the digital entertainment and television media website Primetimer wrote that "Season 34 of The Amazing Race is great not only because of what's in the competition, but also because of what isn't. For the first time, the producers have removed non-elimination legs, which has created some of the most nail-biting episodes in years." Mack Rawden of CinemaBlend wasn't positive towards the removal of non-elimination legs due to it removing tension in the episodes. Joshua Schonfeld of Screen Rant felt that the COVID-19 protocols made the show easier compared to other seasons. In 2024, Rhenn Taguiam of Game Rant ranked this season 23rd out of 36.

== Ratings ==
Viewership and ratings per episode of The Amazing Race 34
No.	Title	Air date	Rating (18–49)	Viewers (millions)	DVR (18–49)	DVR viewers (millions)	Total (18–49)	Total viewers (millions)	Ref.
1	"Many Firsts But Don't Be Last"	September 21, 2022	0.5	3.03	0.4	2.08	0.9	5.11	
2	"Patience, Is the New Me"	September 28, 2022	0.4	2.55	0.4	1.94	0.8	4.49	
3	"It's All in the Details"	October 5, 2022	0.3	2.38	0.3	1.94	0.6	4.32	
4	"Everyone's an Artist"	October 12, 2022	0.3	2.42	0.3	1.80	0.7	4.21	
5	"The Amazing Race of Arabia"	October 19, 2022	0.3	2.33	0.4	1.91	0.6	4.24	
6	"Step By Step"	October 26, 2022	0.3	2.43	0.4	1.84	0.7	4.28	
7	"It's Simply Medieval"	November 2, 2022	0.4	2.80	0.4	1.72	0.7	4.52	
8	"La Ville Rose"	November 9, 2022	0.4	2.86	0.4	1.74	0.8	4.60	
9	"Vamos a la Playa"	November 16, 2022	0.4	3.22	0.4	1.79	0.8	5.01	
10	"Don't Look Down"	November 23, 2022	0.4	3.19	0.4	1.84	0.8	5.21	
11	"How Am I Going to Survive This?"	November 30, 2022	0.4	3.15	0.3	1.67	0.8	4.82	
12	"The Only Leg That Matters"	December 7, 2022	0.5	3.67	0.3	1.55	0.8	5.22	

== Works cited ==
- Castro, Adam-Troy (2006). My Ox Is Broken!. BenBella Books. ISBN 978-1-932100-91-4.
