= Jesse Hernandez (cheerleader) =

American cheerleader

- Occupations: Cheerleader; Dancer; Coach
- Known for: Considered one of the first male National Football League cheerleaders
- Career
- Former groups: Saints Cheer Krewe

Jesse Hernandez is an American dancer, coach, and former professional cheerleader. He is considered one of the first male National Football League (NFL) cheerleaders, along with Napoleon Jinnies and Quinton Peron. He cheered for the New Orleans Saints as a member of the Saints Cheer Krewe from 2018 until 2021. He serves as the head coach of the Penn State University Lionettes Dance Team.

== Early life and education ==
Hernandez graduated from North Vermillion High School in his hometown of Maurice, Louisiana, where he was a member of the dance team.

== Career ==
In 2018, he became the first male cheerleader to make the Saintsations, the official NFL Cheerleading squad for the New Orleans Saints. He made the team again in 2019. At the time he made the squad, he became one of the first male cheerleaders in the National Football League, alongside Napoleon Jinnies and Quinton Peron on the Los Angeles Rams Cheerleaders.

After dancing for the Saints for three seasons, he began coaching the Lionettes dance team at Penn State University. He is also a coach for the Universal Dance Association.

== See also ==
- Louie Conn
- Dylon Hoffpauir
- Napoleon Jinnies
- Quinton Peron
- Blaize Shiek
