= Dylon Hoffpauir =

American dancer and internet personality

- Born: January 21, 1992 (age 34); Erath, Louisiana, U.S.
- Education: Louisiana State University (BA)
- Occupations: Dancer; Cheerleader; Choreographer; Coach; Social media personality
- Career
- Former groups: Saints Cheer Krewe

TikTok information
- Page: dancingdyll
- Followers: 222.4 K
- Last updated: September 7, 2026

Dylon Joel Hoffpauir (born January 21, 1992) is an American dancer, choreographer, coach, and internet personality. He was one of the first male NFL cheerleaders as a member of the Saints Cheer Krewe for the New Orleans Saints from 2019 to 2025. He served as a captain of the team starting in 2022. Hoffpauir served as the head cheerleading and dance coach at Loyola University New Orleans.

== Early life and education ==
Hoffpauir grew up in Erath, Louisiana. He was a member of his high school's cheerleading team. Hoffpauir graduated with a bachelor of arts degree in communications and public relations from Louisiana State University in 2014. He also minored in dance and was a member of the LSU Tigers cheerleading squad and the 2013 homecoming court.

== Career ==
After graduating from college, Hoffpauir completed two college programs with Walt Disney World Entertainment before working as a recruiter and student engagement coordinator at Louisiana State University's Manship School of Mass Communication. After almost three years at the Manship School, he became an admissions counselor at Tulane University School of Public Health and Tropical Medicine.

Hoffpauir also worked as a dance teacher and choreographer in Baton Rouge and New Orleans. He made television and film appearances as a dancer and as a cheerleader in Breakout Kings, Underground, and Pitch Perfect 2.

In 2018, Hoffpauir unsuccessfully tried out for the NBA cheerleading team for the New Orleans Pelicans. In 2019, he became one of the first male cheerleaders in the National Football League when he made the Saints Cheer Krewe, the official cheer team of the New Orleans Saints. He was one of three men to make the team, alongside Jesse Hernandez. In 2022, he was made captain of the squad. He also helped manage and promote the team's social media accounts.

In May 2022, Hoffpauir was hired as the head cheerleading and dance coach at Loyola University New Orleans following the death of coach Rickey Hill. That same year, he competed on the television show Dancing with Myself.

Hoffpauir is a TikToker and amassed a large following on the social media platform during the COVID-19 pandemic.

== Personal life ==
Hoffpauir is gay.

== See also ==
- Louie Conn
- Jesse Hernandez (cheerleader)
- Napoleon Jinnies
- Quinton Peron
- Blaize Shiek
