= Saints Cheer Krewe =

Cheerleading squad of the New Orleans Saints

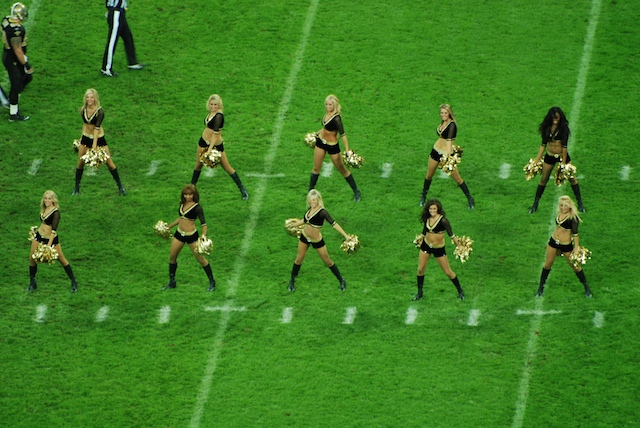
- Established: 1987; 39 years ago
- Members: 32
- Director: Ashley Deaton
- Affiliations: New Orleans Saints
- Website: Official website
- Formerly called: Louisiannes (1967); Mademoiselles (1968); Mam'selles (1969–1971); Bonnes Amies (1975–1978); Angels (1978); Saintsations (1987–2021)

The Saints Cheer Krewe (formerly Saintsations) are a cheerleading and dance squad that performs at New Orleans Saints football games. In addition, they are ambassadors for the organization and can be seen participating in various community events and projects.

== History ==
The New Orleans Saints had two different sets of dance teams prior to the Saintsations. From 1967 to 1971, the original Saints dance team went by several different names, including the Lousiannes in 1967 (which was changed to the Saints Dancers after one pre-season game for that name had been copyrighted by a Louisiana-based high school), the Mademoiselles in 1968, and the Mam'selles from 1969 to 1971. The roster size averaged 48 active dancers per year, with up to 12 "reserve" dancers. The 2018 season marked the first time a male dancer was added to the team.

The original dance team was put together by Tommy Walker, the long-time entertainment director of Disneyland who worked for the Saints during the 1967–1970 football seasons. His choreographer was Phyllis Nelson, a New Orleans–based dance instructor and voice coach who worked as a film actress for RKO pictures in the mid-1950s, was Miss New Orleans United States in 1954, and was a frequent on-air personality at WDSU-TV in the 1950s. Nelson was also team director from 1969 to 1971, replacing Joannie Husser (1967–68). In 1968, Nelson was assisted in the months leading into the season by Tommy Mahoney, a long-time Hollywood choreographer who worked with Tommy Walker at Disneyland. Mahoney helped stage numbers for the dancers at their practice studio which was the U.S. Naval Reserve Training Center on Lakeshore Drive in New Orleans. Once the season started, Mahoney focused on helping Walker with the production of pre-game and halftime shows.

One Mam'selle that went on to entertainment fame was Rhonda Shear (dancer 1970–71), who became a popular TV commercial actress in New Orleans before becoming a national TV star primarily thanks to the USA Network's Up All Night series that ran in the 1980s and 1990s. Another Mam'selle was Sandra Labourdette (1967–1970), the original dance team's captain and later became the first Saintsations choreographer (1987–1993).

The second set of Saints dance teams were from 1975 to 1978 called the Bonnes Amies (French term meaning "Good Friends"). Under the direction and choreography of Dee Kelly Boyd Ervine, who was hired to take the team to a professional level, the Bonnes Amies were the first dancers in the new Superdome. This dance team was very supportive of many charities including the Muscular Dystrophy Association where they annually performed on the local TV affiliate's telethon in addition to having their own exclusive fundraiser for MDA. In 1978, the team was re-organized as the Angels. Unfortunately, this version of the team didn't last very long for in early October 1978 a person who was hired to be a staff assistant to the Angels was discovered to have been arrested for drug possession, but when the New Orleans Saints issued a press statement on this situation the club wouldn't specify that none of the dancers nor their choreographer were involved in the arrest. When the Saints organization refused to allow anyone on the Angels to speak to the press on this matter, the dance team's ties with the Saints ended. The disbanding was so noteworthy that a "radio cartoon" was produced by famed New Orleans broadcaster Ed Clancy called "Saints Angels" which was a parody of the 1950s hit "Earth Angel" by the Crew Cuts where Ed was able to get Crew Cuts lead singer John Perkins to sing lead on his parody as well.

The Bonnes Amiees averaged 16 dancers per year on their roster, the Angels 24.

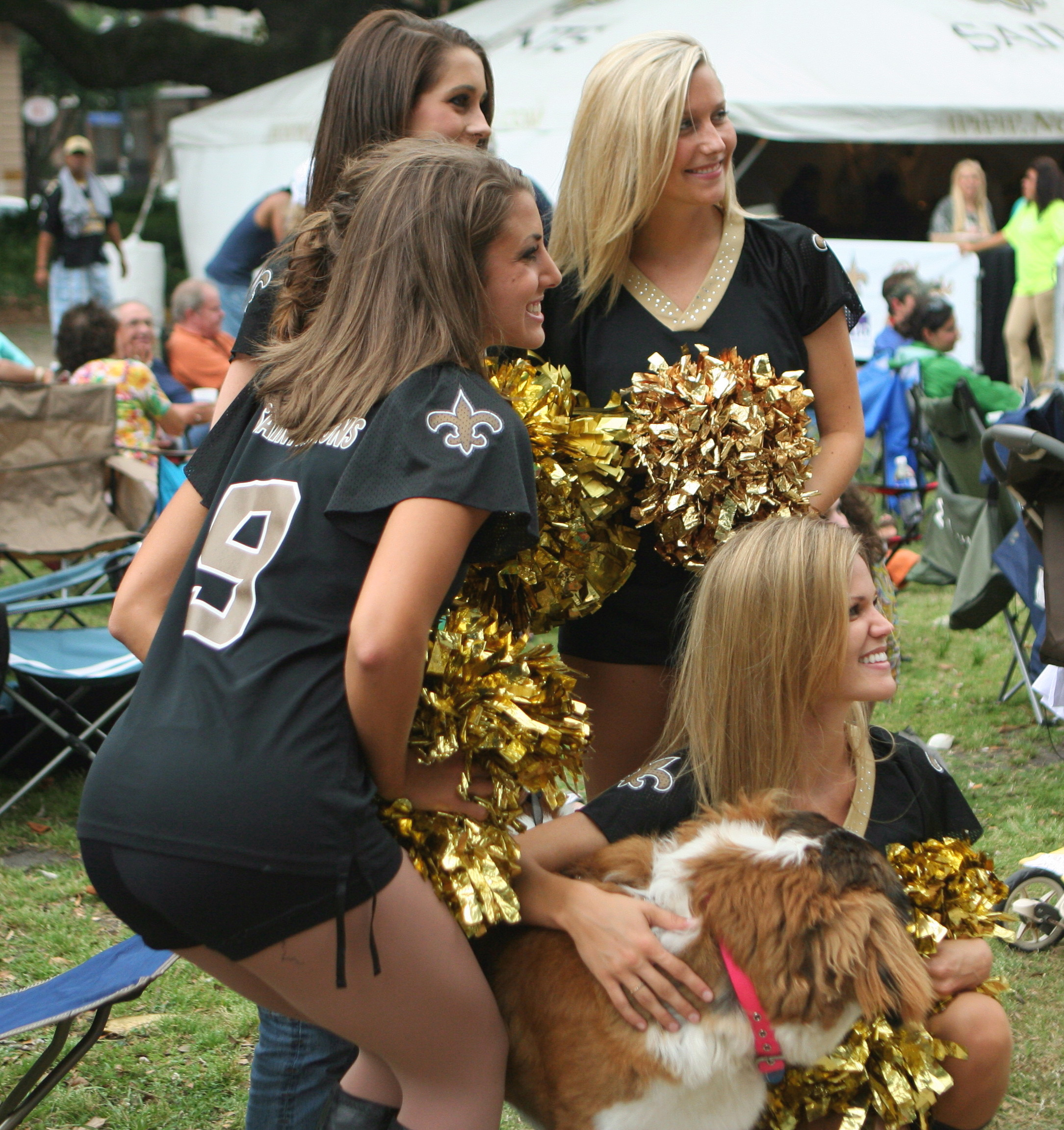
Saints Cheerleaders with a Saint Bernard.

In 1987, Saints General Manager Jim Finks suggested bringing back a dance team to the sidelines which would work in conjunction with the Saints cheerleaders (acrobatic), which had been part of the team since 1967. Under further organizational thought from Saints entertainment director Barra Birrcher (director from 1971–2007), a tryout was held in the spring of 1987. Sandra Labourdette from The Labourdette School Of Dancing in Metairie, LA was chosen as the choreographer. 27 dancers were chosen to be part of what was initially called "The Saints Dancers" before a contest was held where more fans chose the name "Saintsations". Ironically, the first year of the Saintsations the Saints had their first-ever winning season and first playoff appearance. The roster size varied over the years, usually in the 30s, and as high as 40 dancers in 1997.

Original Saintsation Angie Waguespack took over as choreographer from 1994 to 1999. Another one-time Saintsation Lani Quaglino-Neil (1994–99) followed as choreographer in 2000.

The greatest change in Saintsations history occurred in 2001 when St. All-Star, LLC, based on the North shore of Lake Pontchartrain (north of New Orleans), took over the rights to the dance team and created new marketing, promotions, and costume designs that gave the fans a greater variety of dance routines and looks. St. All-Star, LLC was operated by Lesslee Fitzmorris and Royce Mitchell, who produced over 20 NFL Super Bowl pregame entertainment shows. Their efforts recruited outstanding young women as team members. Many former team members are leaders in their communities and serve as doctors, lawyers, teachers, and business owners. Saintsations choreographers have included So You Think You Can DancesStar Steven Boss, LSU Golden Girl director Blair Buras, TV personality Tamica Lee, Lora Davis, Eileen and Michael Arnold, and famed choreographer Denise Glamour. Kelly Dupont served as the appearance coordinator. The average roster size is 28-36. The team has ranged in age from 18 to 42.

Two New Orleans Saints cheerleaders stand with a member of the U.S. Air Force during a U.S.O. visit to Southwest Asia.

Under St. All-Star, LLC, the Saintsations have become international ambassadors of goodwill by touring with the USO to military bases in Iraq, Kuwait, Afghanistan, and other locations to provide entertainment and reassurance for the U.S. military. They also appear at functions in the New Orleans area for charitable, non-profit, and commercial organizations. The Saintsations have their own charitable foundations, including the Saintsations Inspiration Program. Every year this program allows girls under 18 to perform on the Superdome floor with the dance team before a Saints game. The team sponsors a yearly scholarship for a high school dancer or cheerleader. In 2017, the Saintsations returned to the New Orleans Saints management. Ashley Deaton is the current director.

In 2021, the team name was changed to the Saints Cheer Krewe.

== International ==
The Saintsations are no strangers to the international stage. Their first overseas performance was in 1990 in London, when the Saints played the Los Angeles Raiders in a pre-season contest. They made appearances during the week leading into the game and on game day. They repeated this in 1993, when the Saints played in Tokyo for a pre-season game versus the Philadelphia Eagles. Since February 2004, the Saintsations have been the invited guests of the NFL to perform at the annual London Superbash, the official Super Bowl party in Great Britain. In February 2008, they also performed at the official NFL party in Mexico City called the "Fiesta Super Bowl." The Saintsations returned to London again in late October 2008, when the Saints played the San Diego Chargers in a regular-season game at Wembley Stadium.

The Saintsations have sent a member to the Pro Bowl every year since February 1993.

== Notable cheerleaders ==
- Jesse Hernandez, head dance coach at Penn State University
- Dylon Hoffpauir, head cheer & dance coach at Loyola University New Orleans
