= Napoleon Jinnies =

American cheerleader

- Born: Santa Barbara, California, U.S.
- Education: Orange Coast College
- Occupations: Cheerleader; Dancer; Model
- Career
- Former groups: Los Angeles Rams Cheerleaders

Napoleon Jinnies is an American dancer, model, and former professional cheerleader.

== Early life and education ==
Jinnies was born in Santa Barbara, California. He attended Esperanza High School and was a member of the Epseranza Song dance team. He was bullied for his sexual orientation when he was younger.

Jinnies attended Orange Coast College and was on the dance team there.

== Career ==
Jinnies performed as a dancer with Disney and was featured as a model in Abercrombie & Fitch's Fierce cologne advertisement campaign. He also featured in the brand's partnership with The Trevor Project.

Jinnies joined the Los Angeles Rams Cheerleaders in 2018. In 2019, he and Quinton Peron became the first male NFL cheerleaders to perform during the Super Bowl when the Rams played in Super Bowl LIII.

== Personal life ==
Jinnies is openly gay.

== See also ==
- Louie Conn
- Jesse Hernandez (cheerleader)
- Dylon Hoffpauir
- Quinton Peron
- Blaize Shiek
