= Quinton Peron =

American cheerleader

- Occupation: Cheerleader
- Career
- Former groups: Los Angeles Rams Cheerleaders

Quinton Peron is an American dancer and former professional cheerleader. In 2018, he became one of the first male cheerleaders in the National Football League, when he made the Los Angeles Rams Cheerleaders. The following year, he became one of the first male cheerleaders to perform at the Super Bowl.

== Career ==
Peron made the Rams cheerleaders in 2018. In 2019, he and Napoleon Jinnies were the first male NFL cheerleaders to perform during the Super Bowl, when they danced at Super Bowl LIII.

He appeared on To Tell the Truth in a 2020 episode. In 2022, Peron competed on the thirty-fourth season of the CBS reality competition show The Amazing Race.

== Personal life ==
Peron is a classically trained dancer. He is gay.

== See also ==
- Louie Conn
- Jesse Hernandez (cheerleader)
- Dylon Hoffpauir
- Napoleon Jinnies
- Blaize Shiek
