= Minnesota Vikings Cheerleaders =

Cheer squad of the Minnesota Vikings

- Established: 1984; 42 years ago
- Members: 35
- Director: Jacie Scott
- Affiliations: Minnesota Vikings
- Website: Official website

The Minnesota Vikings Cheerleaders are the official cheer squad for the Minnesota Vikings. The squad performs at every home game at the U.S. Bank Stadium, the home stadium of Minnesota. Before the squad's introduction in 1984, The Vi-Queens (1961–63) and the St. Louis Park High School Parkettes performed (1964–65, 67–83) Edina High School Hornettes and Minneapolis Roosevelt High School Rockettes in 1966. In 1984, the MVC were started. The group currently has 35 members. The squad, like other groups in the league, releases a swimsuit calendar annually since 2001. The squad also makes off-field appearances at parades, schools, and charity events. Like other NFL cheerleading squads, the MVC also has a "Junior Minnesota Vikings Cheerleaders" program, which has various divisions: Junior Angel Division is for girls aged 3–5, and Junior Cheerleader Division is for girls aged 6–14. The MVC also helps mentor the Junior Cheerleaders by enriching their interests. In April, the MVC hosts tryouts at Winter Park. From when the division was founded in 2002 to 2016, when the Detroit Lions Cheerleaders were re-established, the Vikings were the only team in the NFC North with a cheerleading squad.

== History ==
In the 2025 preseason, the Vikings introduced two male cheerleaders, Louie Conn and Blaize Shiek, which led to a national backlash on social media and from Fox News personalities. The Vikings defended the dancers in an official statement, saying "male cheerleaders have been a part of previous Vikings teams and have long been associated with collegiate and professional cheerleading."

== Notable cheerleaders ==
- Louie Conn
- Blaize Shiek

== Gallery ==
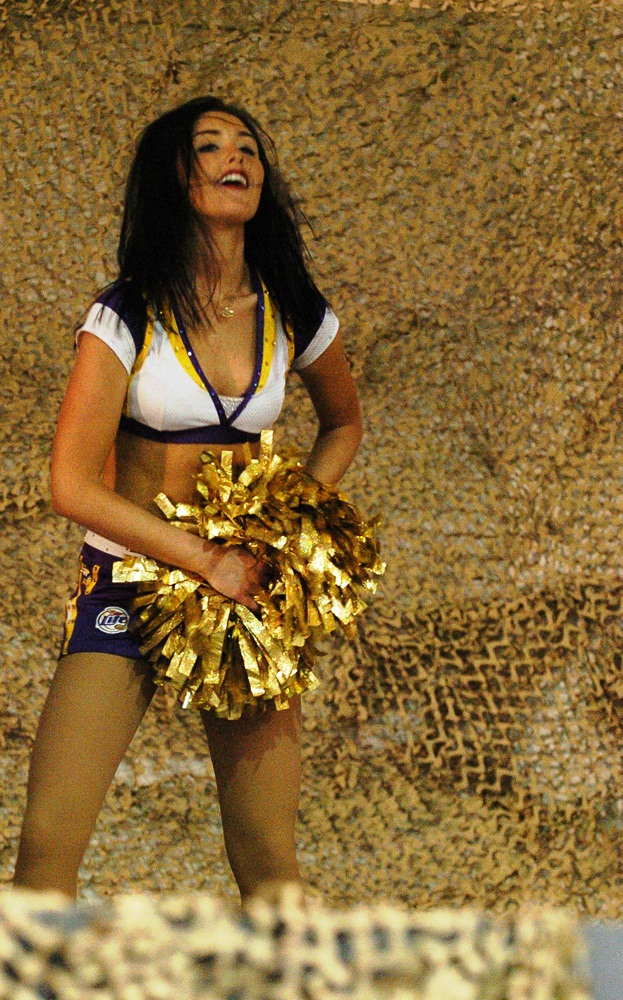

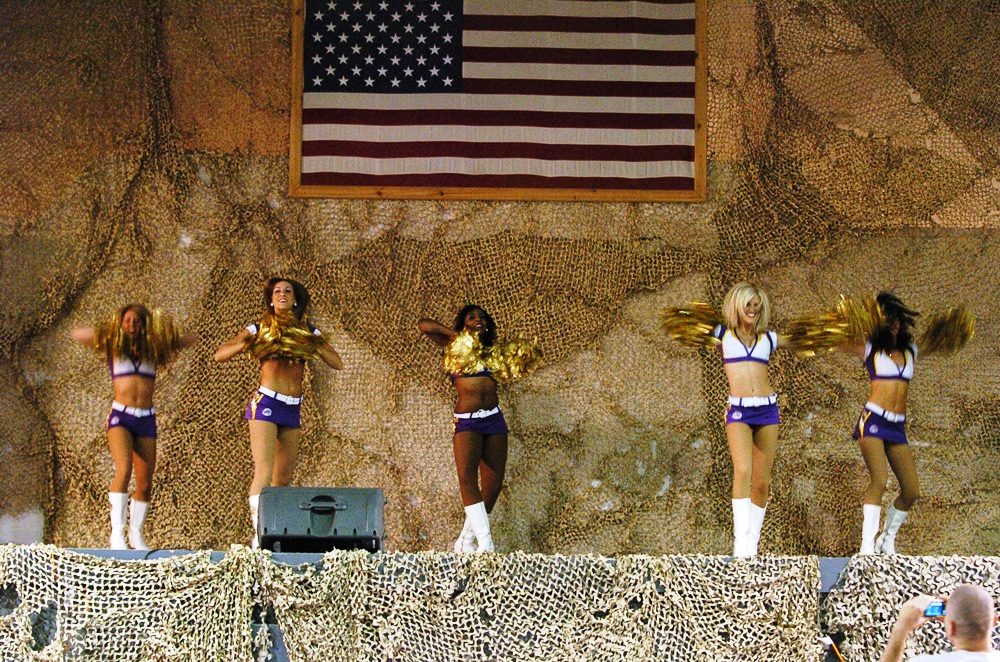

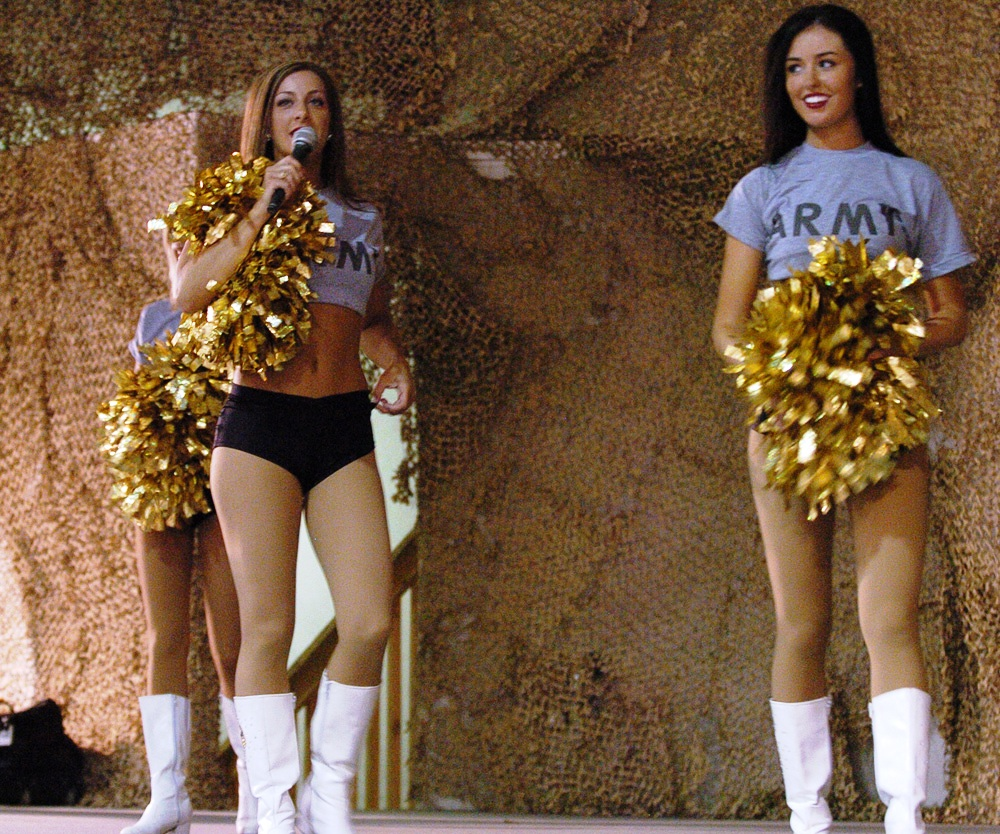

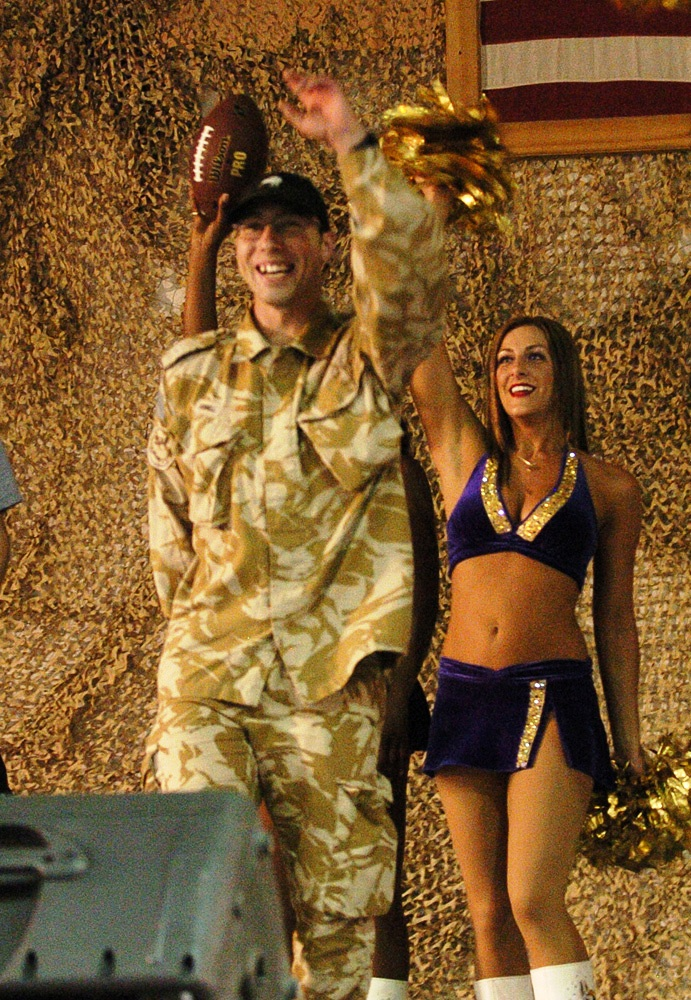

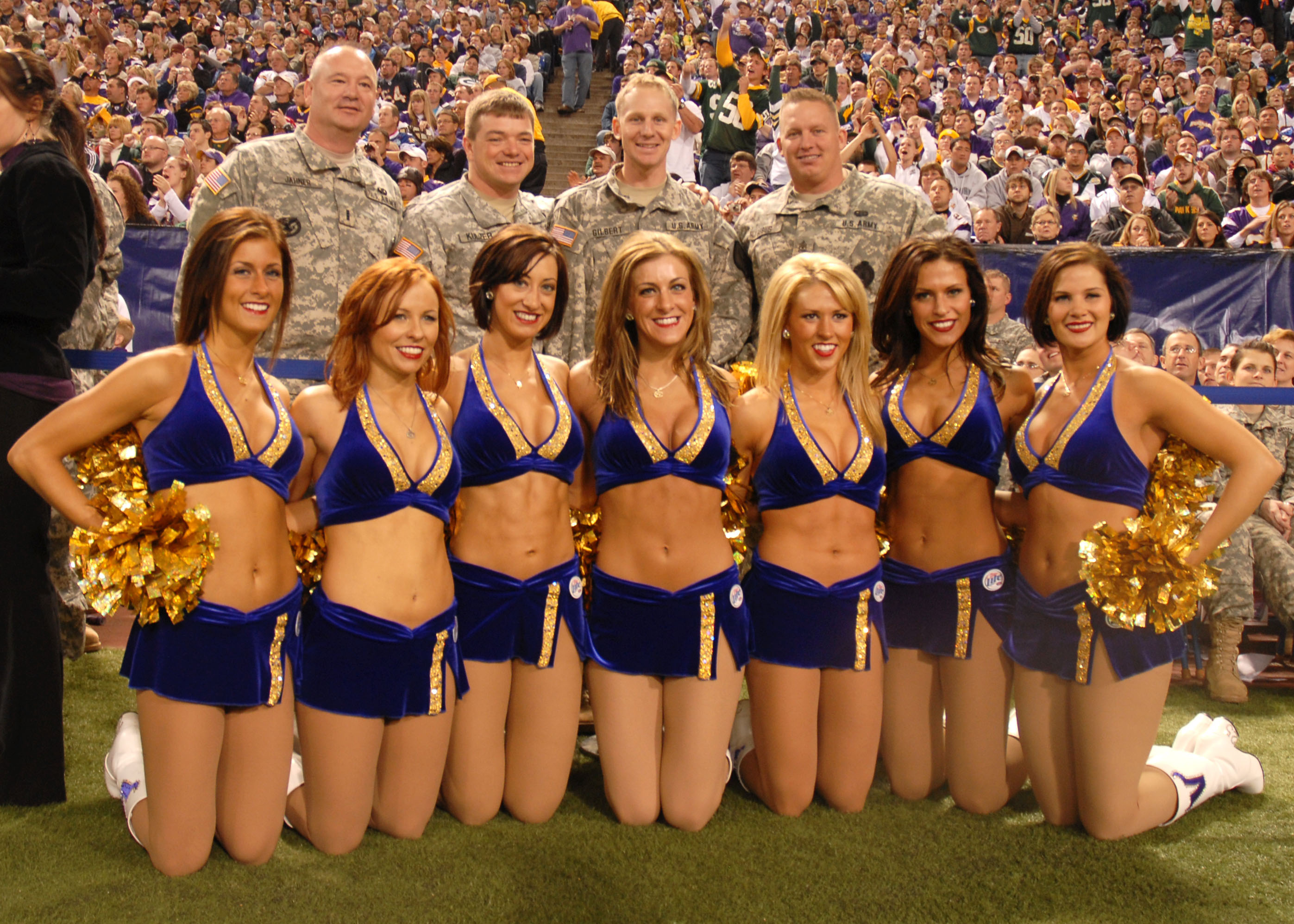
