= Blaize Shiek =

America cheerleader

- Education: North Dakota State University
- Occupations: Cheerleader; Dancer
- Career
- Current group: Minnesota Vikings Cheerleaders

TikTok information
- Page: blaize_shiek
- Followers: 107.7k
- Last updated: March 26, 2026

Blaize Shiek is an American dancer and professional cheerleader. He made the Minnesota Vikings Cheerleaders in 2025.

== Education ==
Shiek graduated from Fargo South High School, where he was the only male member of the Brunkix dance team.

He attended North Dakota State University and was the only male member of the North Dakota State Bison dance squad.

== Career ==
In May 2025, Blaize was one of two male dancers, along with Louie Conn, to make the Minnesota Vikings Cheerleaders. His and Conn's joining the team received criticism, particularly within conservative circles. The Minnesota Vikings released a statement defending Blaize and Conn.

== Personal life ==
Blaize is openly gay.

== See also ==
- Jesse Hernandez (cheerleader)
- Dylon Hoffpauir
- Napoleon Jinnies
- Quinton Peron
