= Louie Conn =

American cheerleader

- Born: Bettendorf, Iowa, U.S.
- Education: Iowa State University
- Occupations: Cheerleader; Dancer
- Career
- Current group: Minnesota Vikings Cheerleaders

Louie Conn is an American dancer and professional cheerleader. In 2025, he made the Minnesota Vikings Cheerleaders.

== Early life and education ==
Conn is from Bettendorf, Iowa. He began his dance training at age 8, taking classes at Kim's School of Dance and Tumbling before joining a competition dance team at age 11. Conn graduated from Pleasant Valley High School, where he was the first male member of the Platinum dance team. He was bullied and targeted with homophobic slurs by classmates for being a dancer.

He attended Iowa State University, where he was a member of the Iowa State Cyclones dance team.

== Career ==
In August 2025, Conn made the Minnesota Vikings Cheerleaders, the official NFL cheerleading squad for the Minnesota Vikings, alongside fellow male cheerleader Blaize Shiek. The team faced criticism from Alabama Republican Senator Tommy Tuberville, Fox News host Will Cain, and Conservative activist Jack Brewer for the inclusion of male dancers. The Vikings released a statement supporting Conn.

== Personal life ==
Conn is openly gay.

== See also ==
- Jesse Hernandez (cheerleader)
- Dylon Hoffpauir
- Napoleon Jinnies
- Quinton Peron
