= Buchetta shop =

Shop selling goods through a small hole in a wall

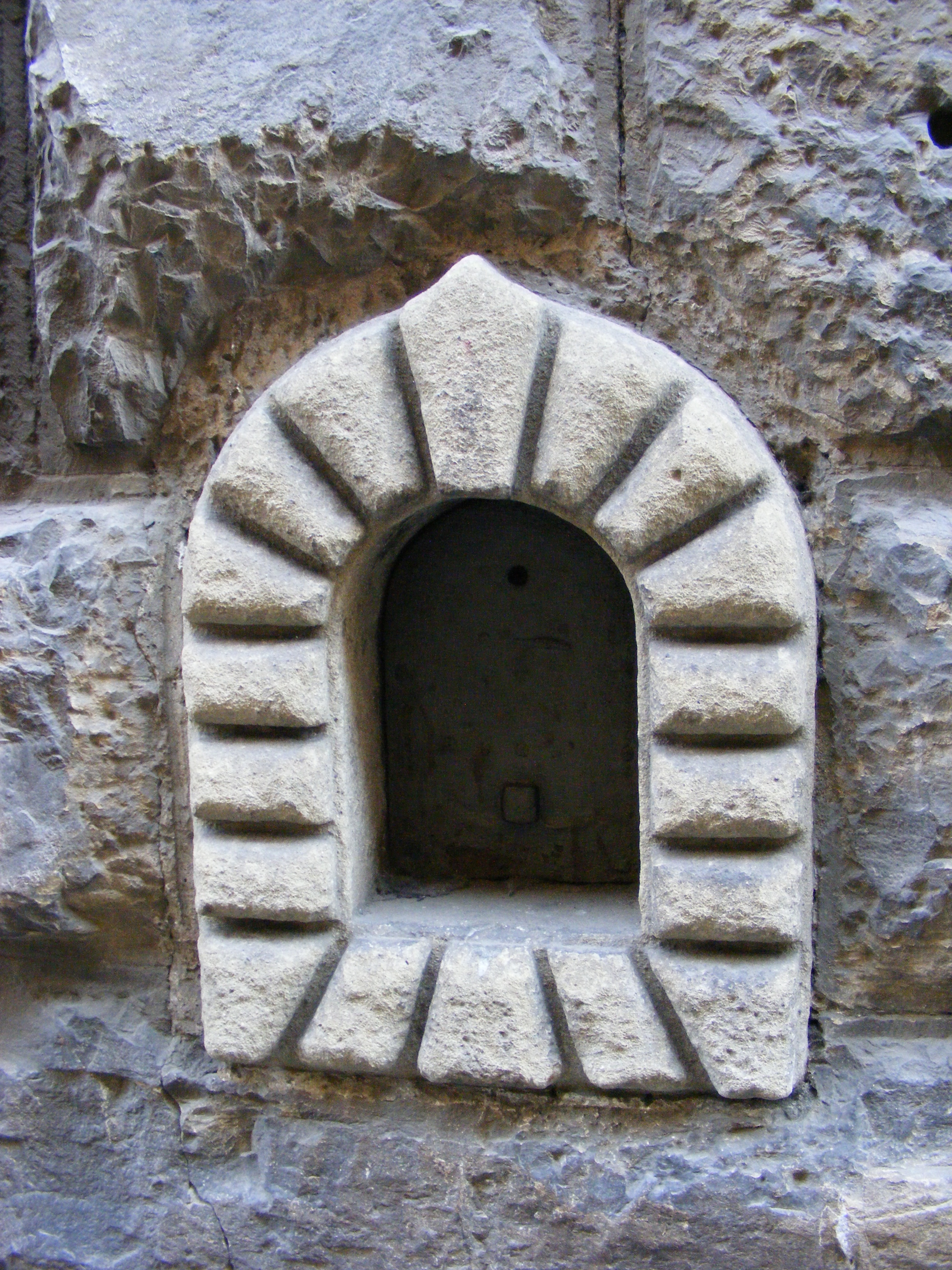
A buchetta window in Florence

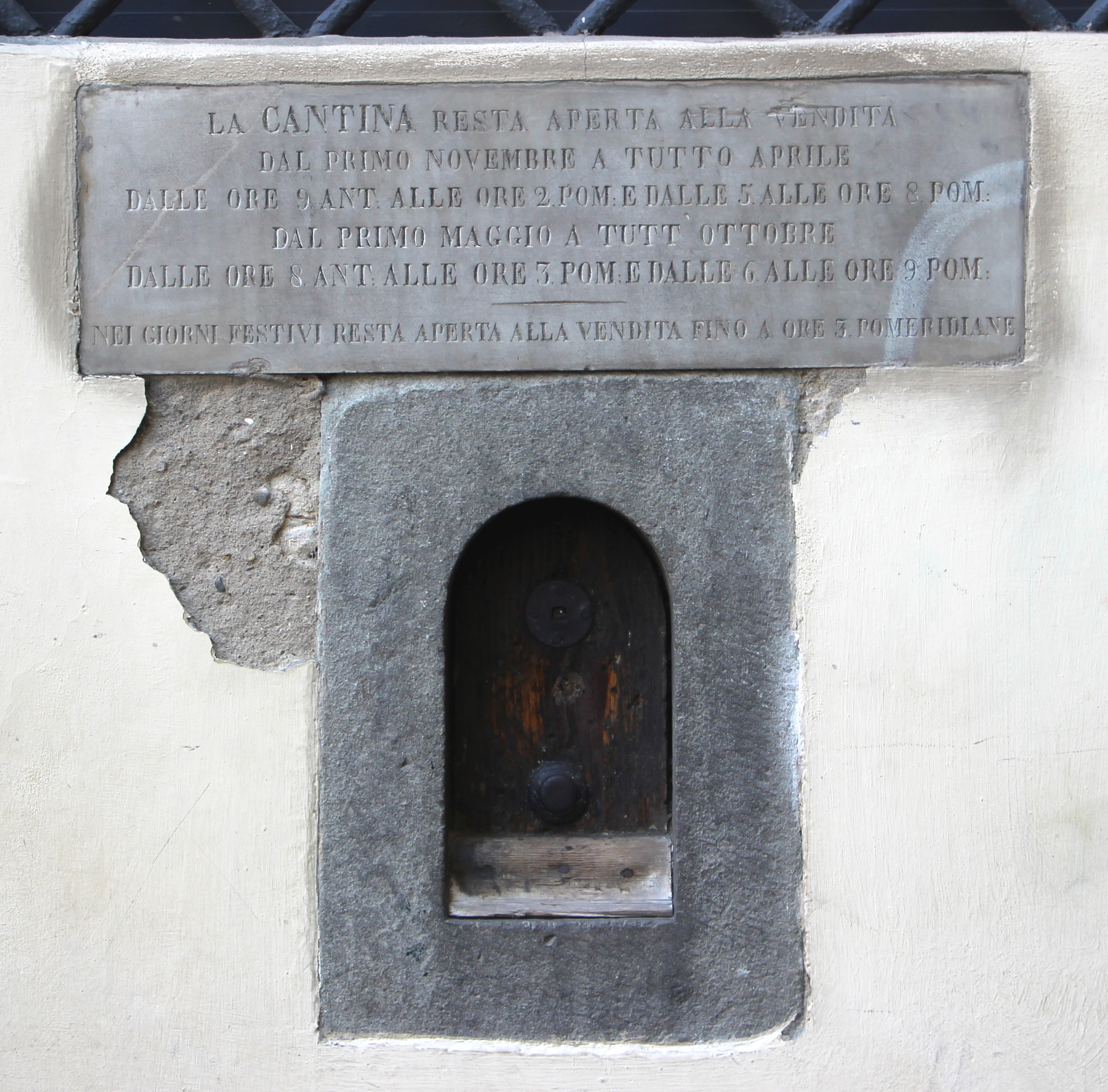
This sportello lists its opening hours

The buchette del vino (“wine windows”) are small architectural openings found primarily in the walls of historic palaces in Florence and elsewhere in Tuscany. They were historically used for the direct sale of wine from aristocratic families’ estates to customers in the street. The tradition developed after regulations introduced under Cosimo I de’ Medici in the sixteenth century allowed vineyard owners to sell their wine directly from their residences.

Many surviving buchette are no longer in use. In recent years, however, some have been reopened by restaurants, wine bars and other businesses. These uses represent a modern revival of the historic wine-window tradition Many buchettas are found in the historic center of Florence. In English, if they sell wine, they may be called wine windows (buchette del vino).

Buchettas are typically of similar dimensions, about 30 centimetres (12 in) tall and 15 centimetres (5.9 in) wide, and arched at the top, but are otherwise very diverse in style. They were usually built into the streetside walls of the palaces of aristocrats, usually near the main entrance, and may be quite ornate. They were closed outside of opening hours with a hatch, which might be painted various colours, or with a still life or religious painting. Many hatches are now missing, and some buchettas are disused and have been sealed off.

== History ==
In 1559, Cosimo I de' Medici, Grand Duke of Tuscany, permitted agriculturalists to sell their wine directly to consumers at their residences. As a result, the servants of the rich Florentine houses sold wine from the lord's estates through tiny windows, just large enough to pass a flask through, which came to be called sportellos. In 1759, the Bando Granducale solidified the concept of botteghe a sportello (sportello shops). This significantly weakened the power of the wine guilds.

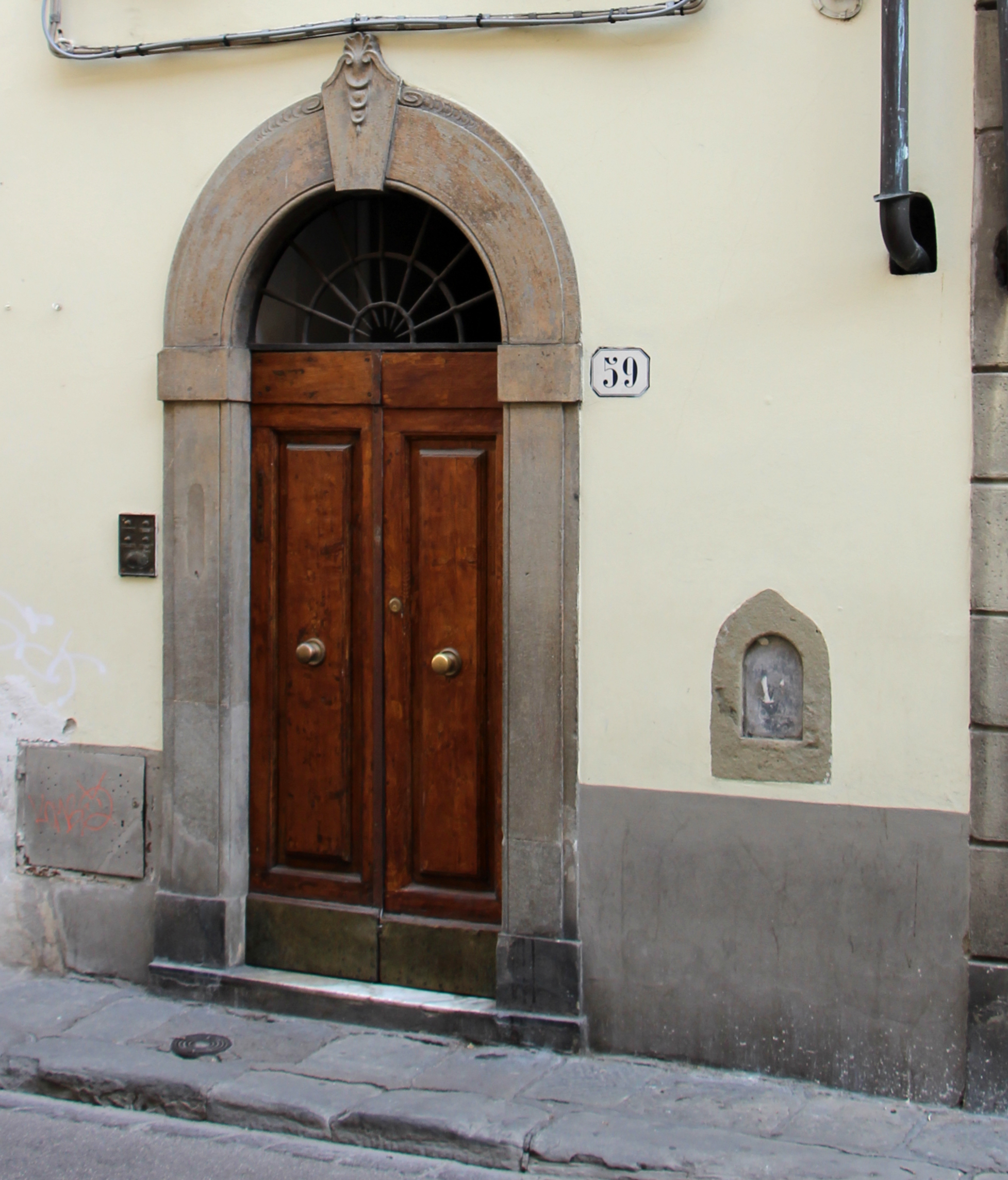
A blocked buchetta beside the entrance doors

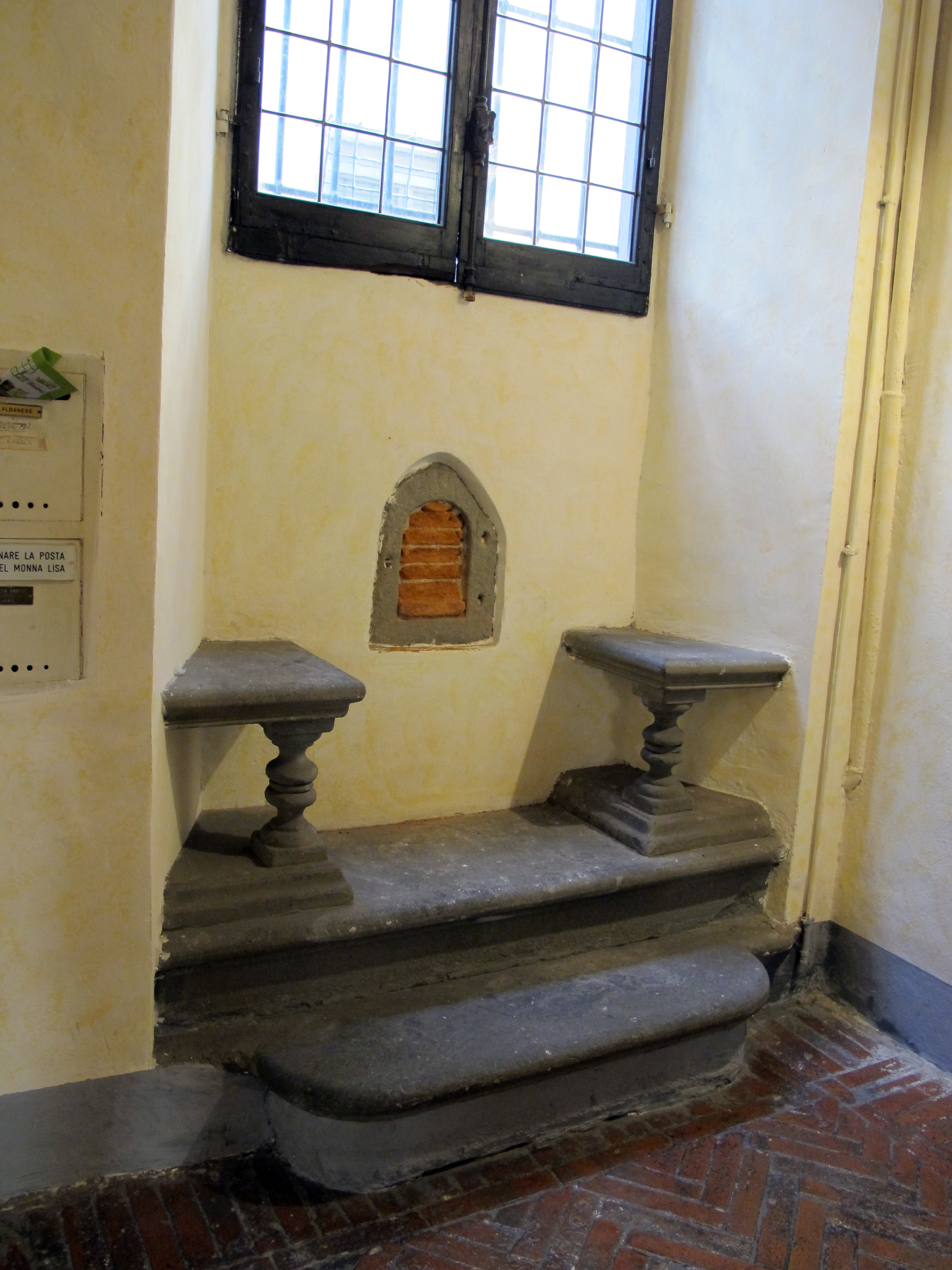
A bricked-up buchetta from the inside

At the beginning of the 1900s, the laws on selling wine changed, the palaces were subdivided, and many buchettas were bricked up, or converted to doorbells or mailboxes or niches. A flood in 1966 destroyed many wooden components, but exposed at least one buchetta which had been plastered over, leading to its restoration.

During the plagues of the Renaissance, the sportellos were used as a low-contagion-risk way of conducting commerce. In the COVID-19 pandemic, a few buchettas were reopened to serve that function again. Food, drinks, and gelato were sold. As of 2023, about seven buchettas in Florence are open serving wine and other drinks, with many more visible but blocked or bricked up.

In 2014, American photographer Robbin Gheesling completed an extensive street photography project documenting the wine doors of Florence, later published as the book Wine Doors of Florence; her work was profiled by CNN in 2020.

Actor and gastronomy presenter Stanley Tucci helped popularise buchette del vino in Firenze among Western audiences with his 2021 CBS Searching for Italy series.
