= Los Angeles Rams Cheerleaders =

NFL cheerleader squad

- Established: 1974; 52 years ago
- Members: 28 (as of 2020)
- Director: Keely Fimbres
- Affiliations: Los Angeles Rams
- Website: Official website
- Formerly called: Embraceable Ewes (1974-1994); St. Louis Rams Cheerleaders (1995-2015); Los Angeles Rams Cheerleaders (2016-Present)

The Los Angeles Rams Cheerleaders are the official cheerleading and dance squad representing the Los Angeles Rams team of the National Football League.

== History ==
They were established in 1974 during the team's original tenure in Los Angeles and were known as the Embraceable Ewes. The cheerleading organization became known as the "St. Louis Rams Cheerleaders" when the team moved to St. Louis, Missouri. Beginning with the 2016 NFL season, the organization changed its name to the "Los Angeles Rams Cheerleaders" to associate themselves with the recently relocated Los Angeles Rams football team. They also have their own television show by the name of LA Rams Cheerleaders: Making the Squad.

== Notable members ==
A number of former Rams Cheerleaders have gone on to achieve success in other notable endeavors. They include:

- Apollonia Kotero (1980s), co-star of 1984 film Purple Rain. Former girlfriend of singer Prince, and lead singer of the group Apollonia 6.
- Lisa Guerrero (1983–1987), American sports broadcaster, actress, model and former correspondent for Inside Edition.
- Jenilee Harrison (1978–1980), actress: played "Cindy Snow" on the television show Three's Company
- Napoleon Jinnies, dancer and model
- Quinton Peron, dancer
- Maxxine Dupri, professional wrestler
