= Palace Tomb =

Tomb in Jordan

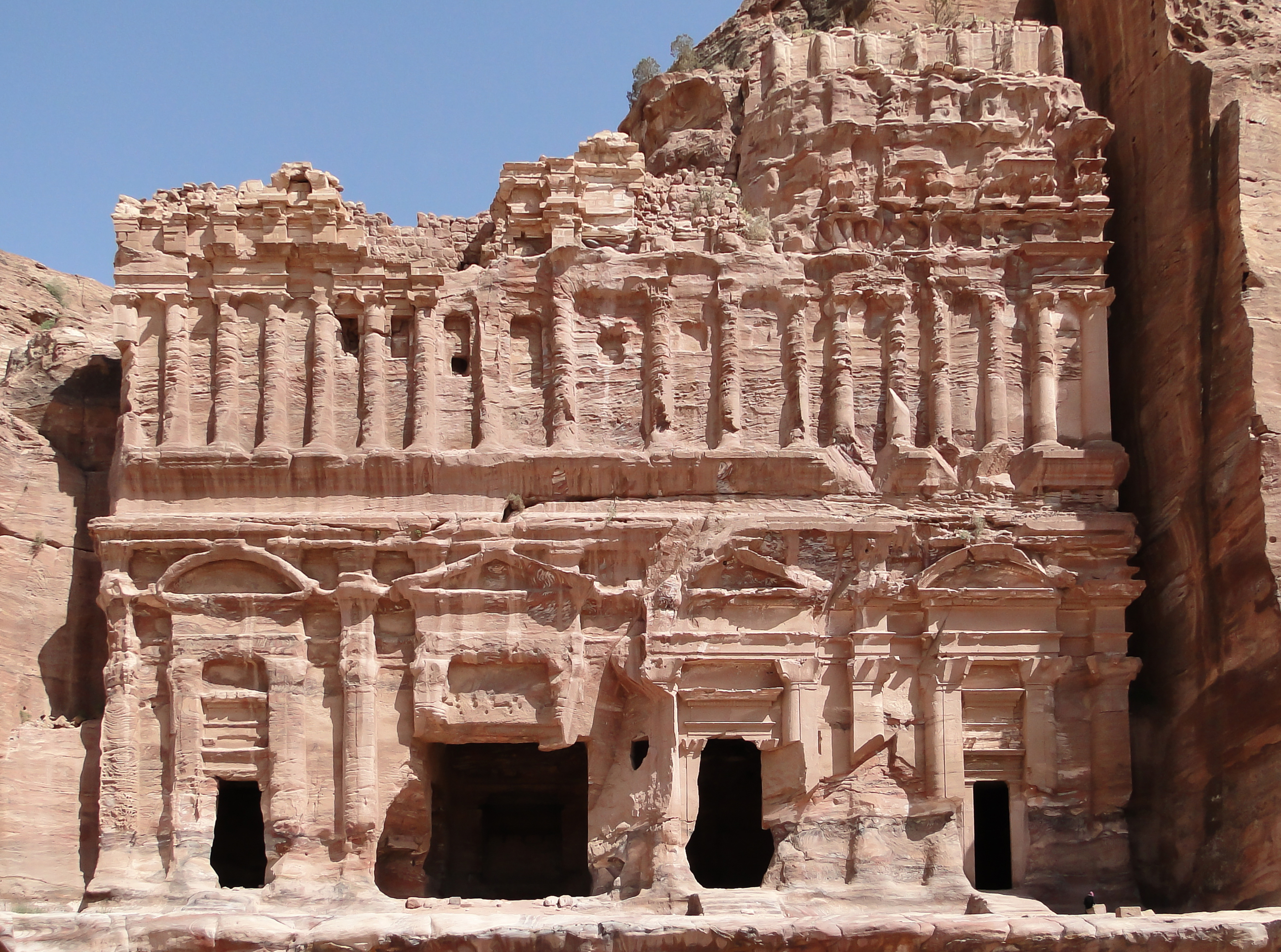
The Facade of the Palace Tomb

The Palace Tomb is a Nabataean tomb in the Petra Archaeological Park. It is situated among the Royal Tombs, a line of prominent monumental facades on the east cliffs flanking the valley in which the city lies. At 49 meters wide and 46 meters tall, its rock-hewn façade is one of the largest in Petra. The tomb's name is derived from its supposed resemblance to a Roman palace design popularized by Nero's Golden House, as well as its wide and richly decorated structure... The descriptive name is based on its appearance today, rather than historical evidence for its use by royalty or occupation as a palace. The title “Palace Tomb” is recorded in the earliest catalog of tombs in Petra (no. 765).

== Date ==
The Palace Tomb (right) among the Royal Tombs

The Palace Tomb was built toward the end of the first century CE. This date is derived from the tomb's architectural style and its relationship to other nearby tombs, specifically due to the “marked deterioration” of its decorative classical elements.

== Facade ==
The facade of the Palace Tomb has three stories, the highest of which is notable because it reaches beyond the face of the cliff and is built, rather than carved, in the top left corner. This construction is significant as the Palace Tomb is one of the only monuments in Petra which mixes the carved and built structure.

The first story has four aediculae, or small shrines surmounted by columns, which act as entryways into the tomb. The middle two of these thresholds are almost twice as wide as the outer two. A further distinction is that the middle entrances have triangular pediments, while the outer are semi-circular.

These aediculae lead into four burial rooms, some of which have graves carved into the walls. Additionally, several of these rooms have niches carved around them, in line with the natural patterns of the rock. Flanking the aedicula are single columns, double-engaged or decorated only with two vertical lines. Two smaller, similarly decorated columns are carved to either side of each doorway, and two yet smaller columns are themselves the sides of each entrance. Each gate has a small ramp to the interior, which could facilitate movement between the inner space and more publicly visible outer area.

The second story has eighteen engaged columns whose capitals are unevenly spaced across its façade. These columns lack the simple decoration of those on the first story, but are otherwise almost identical. Between the eight inner-most second-story columns, rectangular niches have been carved at irregular intervals. These columns end at the third story's cleanly carved base.

Much of the third story is not preserved, as it extends beyond the existing rock face and had to be constructed from ashlar blocks to complete the uneven shape of the facade. As a result, most of the upper-left corner of the facade is no longer extant, and the stone-block support system is visible behind the carved rock to even the casual observer. From what remains, there were likely more columns on the highest story than in the lower two, which appear to be the least elaborate.

The Palace Tomb is generally considered to be one of the finest of the rock-carved monuments of Petra, although the upper part of the façade is partly built of masonry. Its façade, crossed by several natural joints, shows many of the typical forms of weathering seen at Petra. The erosion done by rainwater run-off is most severe where the protective cornices and gutters have been breached by the action of water infiltrating into the joints.

In the winter of 1988, block failure and major cracking occurred in the Palace Tomb and several blocks of stone fell down from its masonry superstructure. In answer to an appeal by the Jordanian Audiorities, UNESCO provided financial assistance from the World Heritage Fund in order to enable the DOA to purchase scaffolding and carry out urgent consolidation works. As a result, the DOA was able to build a 50 metre high scaffolding to reach the upper storey. The cause of collapse of the masonry was found to be a break in the water channel which collected the rainwater from behind the monument to a large reservoir in a corner of the roof terrace. Some repairs were carried out to the stonework, under the direction of Mr. Abed Majid Mujelli of the DOA, as well as clearing of some of the accumulated earth from the cistern on its roof terrace. No crane was available to lift the building materials to the inaccessible roof of the monuments, only pulleys being available, and the parapet was only partly consolidated.
