= Chloe Holladay =

American majorette

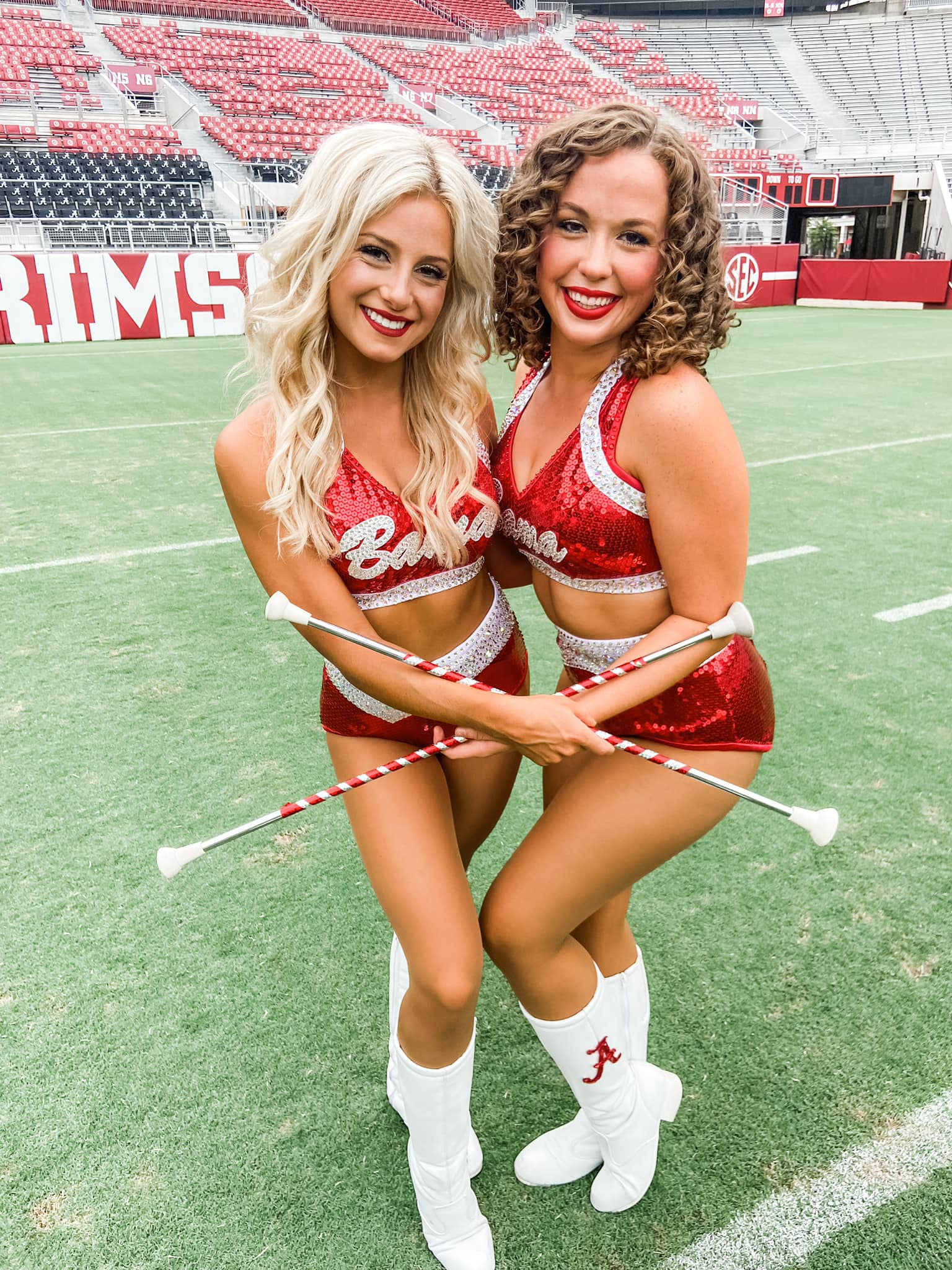
- Holladay (left) in 2022
- Born: Hartselle, Alabama, U.S.
- Education: University of Alabama (BSN)
- Occupations: majorette internet personality
- Years active: 2020–present
- Spouse: Kulyn Hubbard
- Dancing career
- Current group: Tennessee Titans Blue Crew
- Former groups: Crimsonettes

TikTok information
- Page: chloe_holladay
- Followers: 1.1M
- Last updated: August 29, 2025

Chloe Holladay is an American dancer, baton twirler, and internet personality. She was a member of the Crimsonettes, the majorettes for the University of Alabama's Million Dollar Band, before joining the Tennessee Titans Cheerleaders and Blue Crew Drumline as a majorette in 2025. She is the first majorette for the Tennessee Titans and the first majorette in the NFL since 2002.

== Early life and education ==
Holladay is from Hartselle, Alabama and began training in dance and baton twirling when she was five years old, training at Kim's Star Twirlers. Holladay attended Hartselle High School, where she was the captain of the majorettes, graduating in 2020.

She attended the University of Alabama, where she was a member of the Crimsonettes, the official majorettes affiliated with the Million Dollar Band, performing at Alabama Crimson Tide football games. She served as a co-captain of the Crimsonettes in 2023. Holladay graduated from the University of Alabama in 2024 with a degree in nursing.

== Career ==
After graduating, Holladay was featured in Sports Illustrated. In 2025, she became the first ever majorette for the Tennessee Titans, as a member of the Tennessee Titans Cheerleaders and the Blue Crew Drumline. Holladay is the first majorette in the National Football League since 2002, when the Detroit Lions disbanded their majorettes team. She also performed at a Rocket City Trash Pandas game.

Holladay is a social media influencer, amassing 1.1 million followers on TikTok, with 84.5 million likes, and 486,000 followers on Instagram by July 2025. She has partnered with brands including Tylenol and Color Street.

== Personal life ==
Holladay is married to Kulyn Hubbard.
