= Tennessee Titans Cheerleaders =

Cheerleading squad for the Tennessee Titans of the NFL

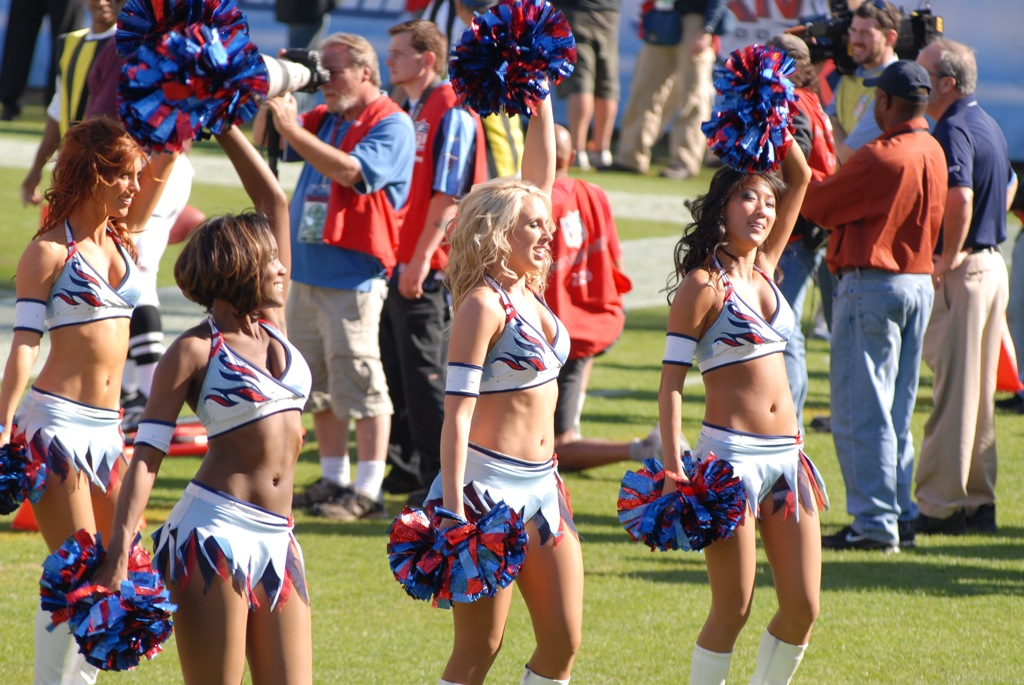
- Titans cheerleaders performing in 2008
- Established: 1975; 51 years ago
- Members: 28
- Affiliations: Tennessee Titans
- Website: Official website
- Formerly called: Derrick Dolls (1975–1987; 1993–1996); Tennessee Oilers Cheerleaders (1997–1998); Tennessee Titans Cheerleaders (1999–present)

The Tennessee Titans Cheerleaders are the cheerleading squad of the Tennessee Titans of the NFL. The squad performs a variety of dance moves during home games at Nissan Stadium, and performs with Titans mascot T-Rac, as well as their junior squad.

== History ==
The squad was established in 1975 as the Derrick Dolls, and changed to the current name when the Titans (then known as the Oilers) moved to Tennessee. The group currently has 25 cheerleaders. The squad also makes USO trips, with the members making trips to Kuwait and Diego Garcia for their All-Star Super Bowl Tour. The squad holds auditions at Baptist Sports Park. Other than performances on the field, the squad also has made appearances on "The Oprah Winfrey Show" and "The Dr. Oz Show". Annually, the squad makes a swimsuit calendar, and one that's available to download onto tablets and smartphones. The squad also makes appearances off the field.

The Titans have used male cheerleaders in their history multiple times, from 1999-2003, and again from 2019 to the present. The men were originally called "yell leaders," with a similar role to collegiate cheerleading, and the high-risk stunting returned in 2019.

For the 2025 season, they welcomed their first majorette, Chloe Holladay.
