= Crimsonettes =

Baton twirling unit

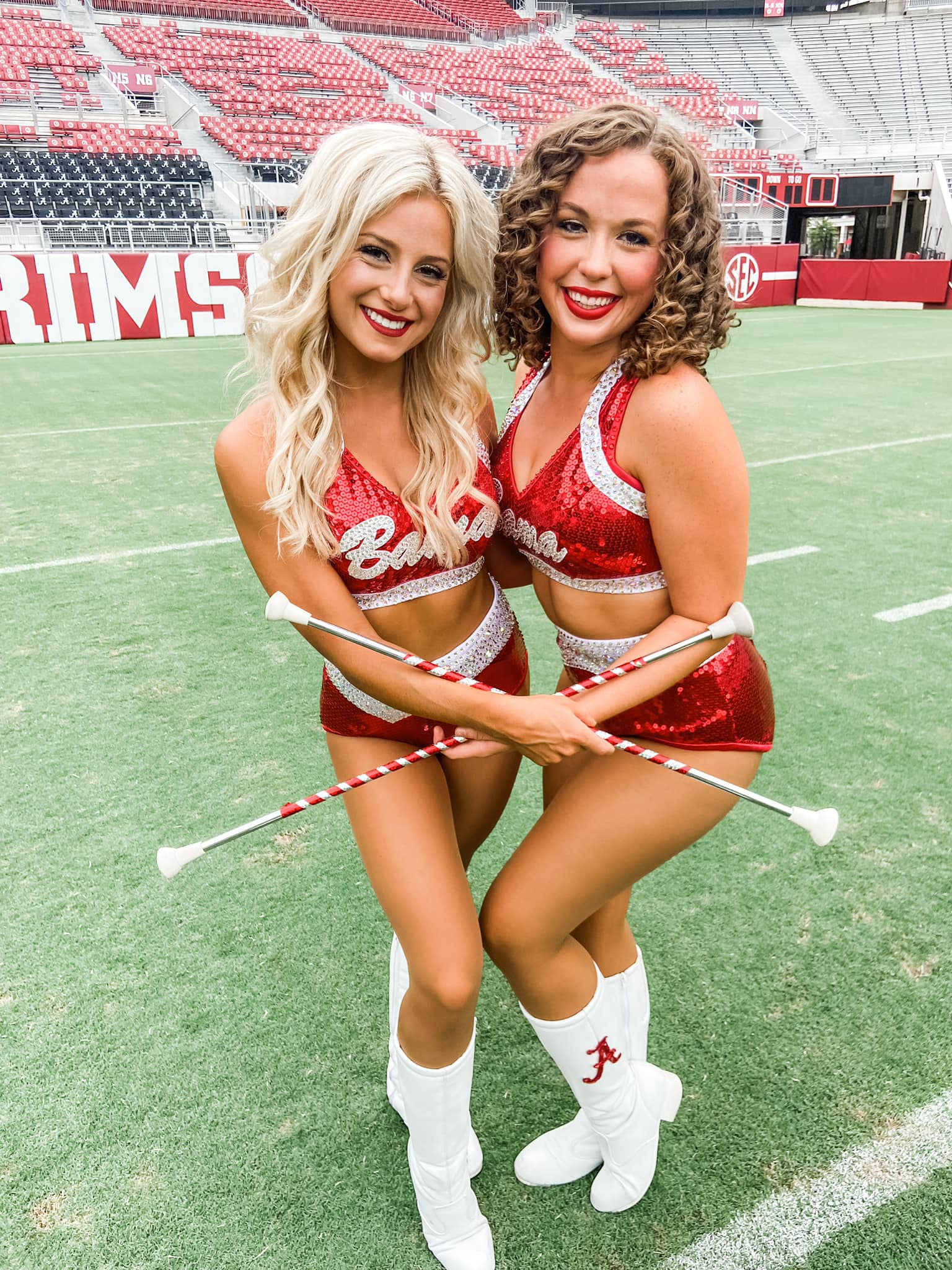
Crimsonettes from the 2022-2023 academic school year.

The Alabama Crimsonettes are the baton twirling unit of the University of Alabama Million Dollar Band. They perform during the half-time show of at University of Alabama football games. They also participate in parades and other public events. The squad typically has 25 women, including one captain. In order to join the squad, a woman must first apply to the University. Once accepted the potential candidate may apply for a chance to try out.

The Crimsonettes are known for their flashy costumes and quick dance moves while twirling. Typically the uniforms are red sequin two-piece uniforms (although they used to be leotards), suntan pantyhose, and big hair with white go-go boots.

Although auxiliaries began with the band in 1951 with the addition of the Miss Alabama Sponsor, the Crimsonettes began in 1976. They have performed in numerous bowl games and parades.

== Notable Crimsonettes ==
- Chloe Holladay, NFL Majorette for the Tennessee Titans
