= Mike Borgonzi =

American football executive

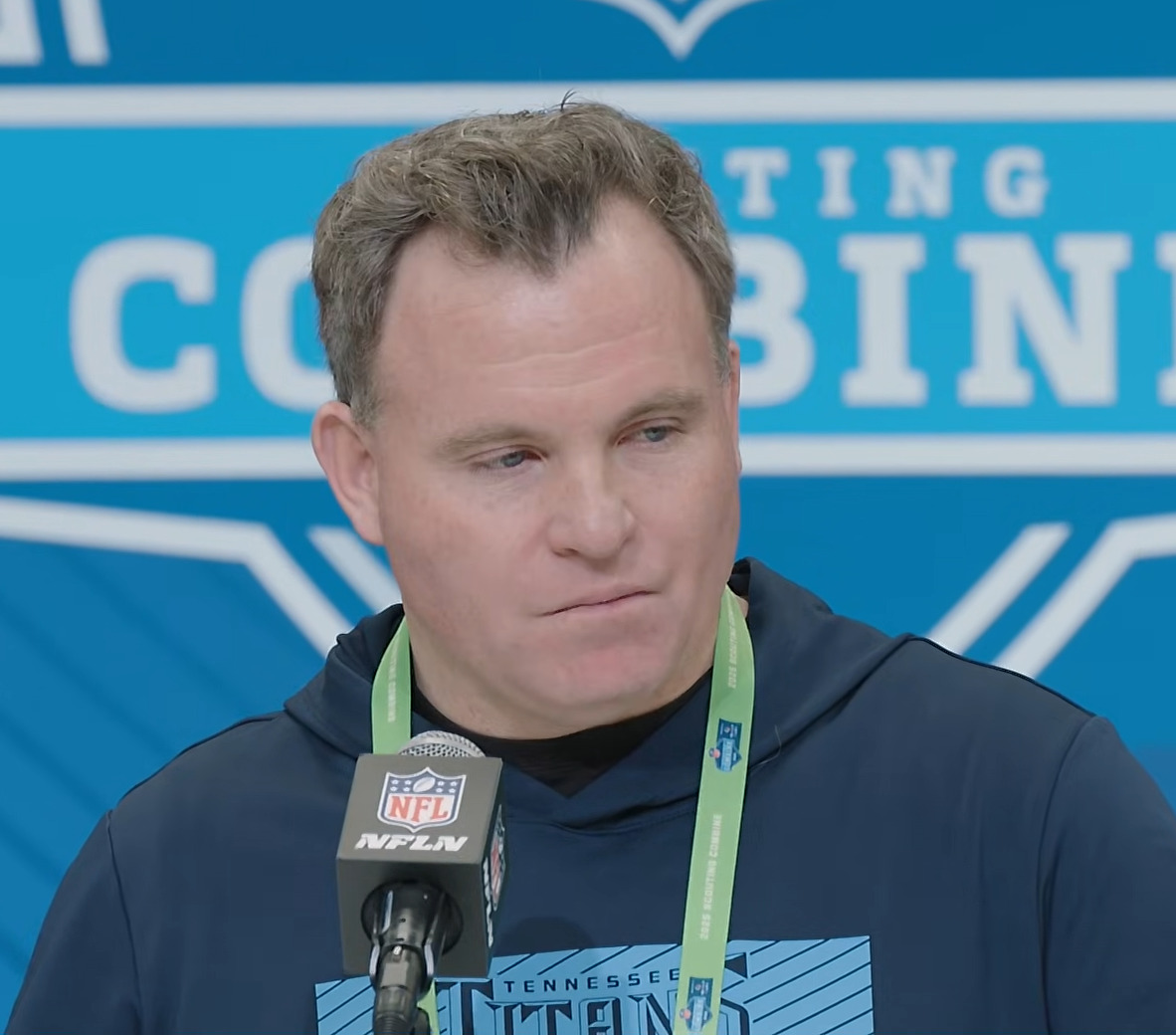
- Borgonzi in 2025

Tennessee Titans
- Title: General manager

Personal information
- Born: Everett, Massachusetts, U.S.

Career information
- Position: Fullback
- College: Brown (1998–2001)

Career history

Coaching
- Amherst (2002) Tight ends coach

Operations
- Boston College (2007–2008) Assistant recruiting coordinator; Kansas City Chiefs (2009–2024); Administrator of college scouting (2009); Manager of football operations (2010); Pro scout (2011–2012); Assistant director of pro scouting (2013–2014); Director of player personnel (2015–2017); Director of football operations (2018–2020); Assistant general manager (2021–2024); Tennessee Titans (2025–present) General manager

Awards and highlights
- 3× Super Bowl champion (LIV, LVII, LVIII)

Michael Borgonzi is an American professional football executive who is the general manager of the Tennessee Titans of the National Football League (NFL). He previously served in various scouting and executive roles for the Kansas City Chiefs from 2009 to 2024.

== Early life and education ==
A native of Everett, Massachusetts, Borgonzi played football at Everett High School as a student. From here, Borgonzi was accepted into the ivy league Brown University where he played college football for the Brown Bears. Playing as a fullback, Borgonzi was a four-year starter from 1998 to 2001 and earned All-Ivy League honors three times. After four years, Borgonzi earned a degree in business management.

== Executive career ==
=== Early career ===
In 2002, Borgonzi served as the tight ends coach at Amherst College. He then spent several years working in the financial sector in Boston. From 2007 to 2008, Borgonzi served as the assistant recruiting coordinator at Boston College.

=== Kansas City Chiefs ===
In 2009, Borgonzi was hired by the Kansas City Chiefs as their administrator of college scouting under general manager Scott Pioli. In 2010, Borgonzi was promoted to manager of football operations. In 2011, Borgonzi was promoted to pro scout. In 2013, Borgonzi was promoted to assistant director of pro scouting under general manager John Dorsey. In 2015, Borgonzi was named co-director of player personnel, alongside Brett Veach.

In 2017, Borgonzi was promoted to director of player personnel under general manager Brett Veach. The following year, Borgonzi was promoted to director of football operations. In 2019, Borgonzi won his first Super Bowl when the Chiefs beat the San Francisco 49ers 31–20 in Super Bowl LIV. Two years later, Borgonzi was promoted to assistant general manager. In 2022, he won his second Super Bowl when the Chiefs beat the Philadelphia Eagles 38–35 in Super Bowl LVII. The following year, Borgonzi won his third Super Bowl when the Chiefs beat the 49ers 25–22 in overtime during Super Bowl LVIII.

=== Tennessee Titans ===
On January 17, 2025, Borgonzi was named the general manager of the Tennessee Titans, replacing Ran Carthon.

== Personal life ==
Borgonzi and his wife, Jill, have two children. His brother, Dave, is currently the linebackers coach for the Titans.
