= Dave Borgonzi =

American football coach (born 1982)

Tennessee Titans
- Title: Linebackers coach

Personal information
- Born: November 19, 1982 (age 43); Everett, Massachusetts, U.S.
- Listed height: 5 ft 11 in (1.80 m)
- Listed weight: 225 lb (102 kg)

Career information
- Position: Linebacker
- College: Amherst College

Career history
- Syracuse (2006–2007) Graduate assistant; Harvard (2008–2010) Defensive backs coach; Dallas Cowboys (2011–2012) Defensive assistant; Dallas Cowboys (2013) Offensive assistant; Tampa Bay Buccaneers (2014–2017) Defensive quality control coach; Indianapolis Colts (2018–2021) Linebackers coach; Chicago Bears (2022–2024) Linebackers coach; Dallas Cowboys (2025) Linebackers coach; Tennessee Titans (2026–present) Linebackers coach

Dave Borgonzi (born November 19, 1982) is an American football coach who currently serves as the linebackers coach for the Tennessee Titans of the National Football League (NFL). He has previously served as an assistant coach for the Indianapolis Colts, Tampa Bay Buccaneers, Chicago Bears, and Dallas Cowboys.

== Playing career ==
Borgonzi played inside linebacker at Amherst College. There he served as a three year starter and was named a team captain during his senior season.

== Coaching career ==
=== Syracuse ===
Borgonzi spent two years at Syracuse working as a graduate assistant. While with the Orange he earned his master's degree in education.

=== Harvard ===
While at Harvard, Borgonzi served as a recruiter for the school and as the assistant defensive secondary coach.

=== Dallas Cowboys ===
Borgonzi worked from 2011 to 2013 as a coaching assistant for the Dallas Cowboys. He worked with the defensive side of the ball for his first two years before moving to offense in 2013.

=== Tampa Bay Buccaneers ===
From 2014 to 2017 Borgonzi worked as an assistant for the Buccaneers.

=== Indianapolis Colts ===
Dave was hired as the Colts linebackers coach in 2018. He missed week 15 of the 2020 season due to COVID-19.

=== Chicago Bears ===
On February 2, 2022, Borgonzi was hired by the Chicago Bears as their linebackers coach, following new Head Coach Matt Eberflus from the Indianapolis Colts.

=== Dallas Cowboys (second stint) ===
On January 29, 2025, the Dallas Cowboys announced Borgonzi as their linebackers coach. On January 27, 2026, Borgonzi was fired by the Cowboys.

=== Tennessee Titans ===
On February 11, 2026, the Tennessee Titans announced Borgonzi was joining the team as a linebackers coach.

== Personal life ==
Borgonzi's brother, Mike, is the general manager of the Tennessee Titans.

Borgonzi and his wife Alyssa have a daughter, Gianna, and a son, James.
