= Million Dollar Band (marching band) =

Marching band of the University of Alabama

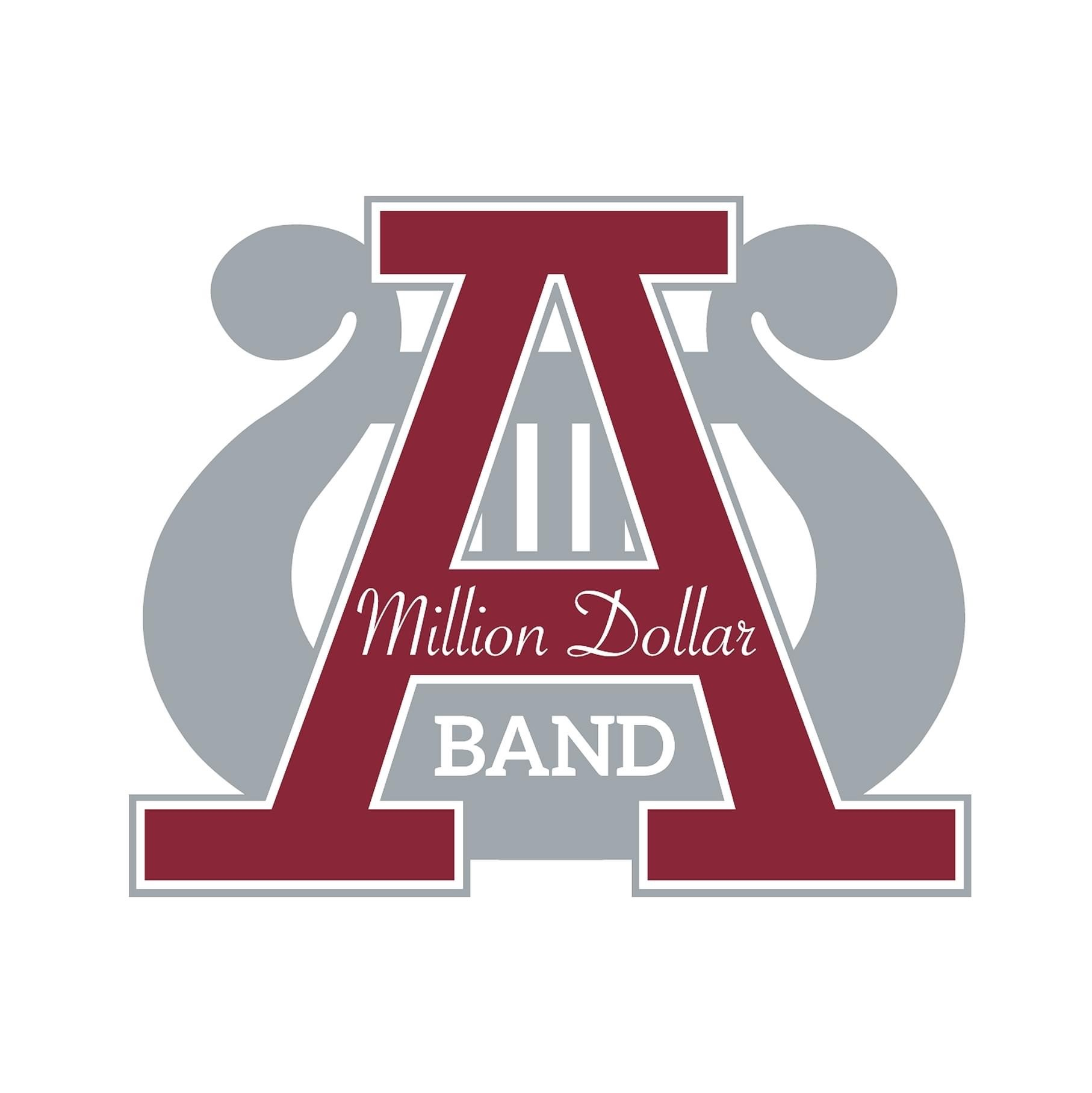
- School: University of Alabama
- Location: Tuscaloosa, Alabama
- Conference: SEC
- Founded: 1912
- Director: Kenneth Ozzello
- Members: 415
- Practice field: Butler Field
- Fight song: "Yea Alabama"
- Website: bands.ua.edu/mdb-2/

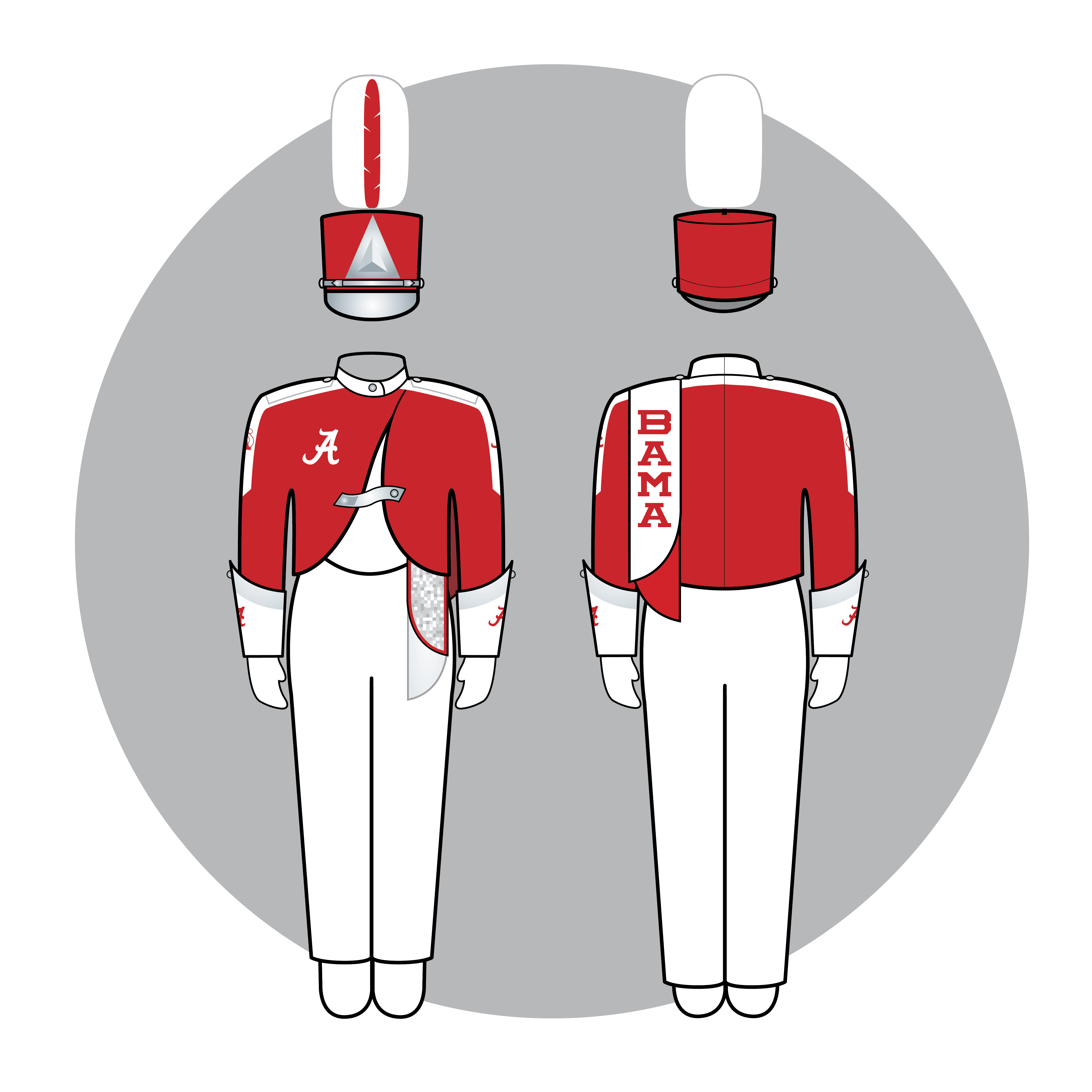
Million Dollar Band uniform, front and back.

The Million Dollar Band (sometimes shortened to MDB) is the official marching band of the University of Alabama. Founded in 1912, the Million Dollar Band is the largest student organization at the University of Alabama. The band performs during pregame and halftime of every home and neutral-site Alabama football game; it also supplies at least a pep band to every away football game, as well as home men's basketball, women's basketball, women's gymnastics, and volleyball games. In 2003, the band was awarded the Sudler Trophy, recognizing it as one of the top college bands in the United States.

== History ==
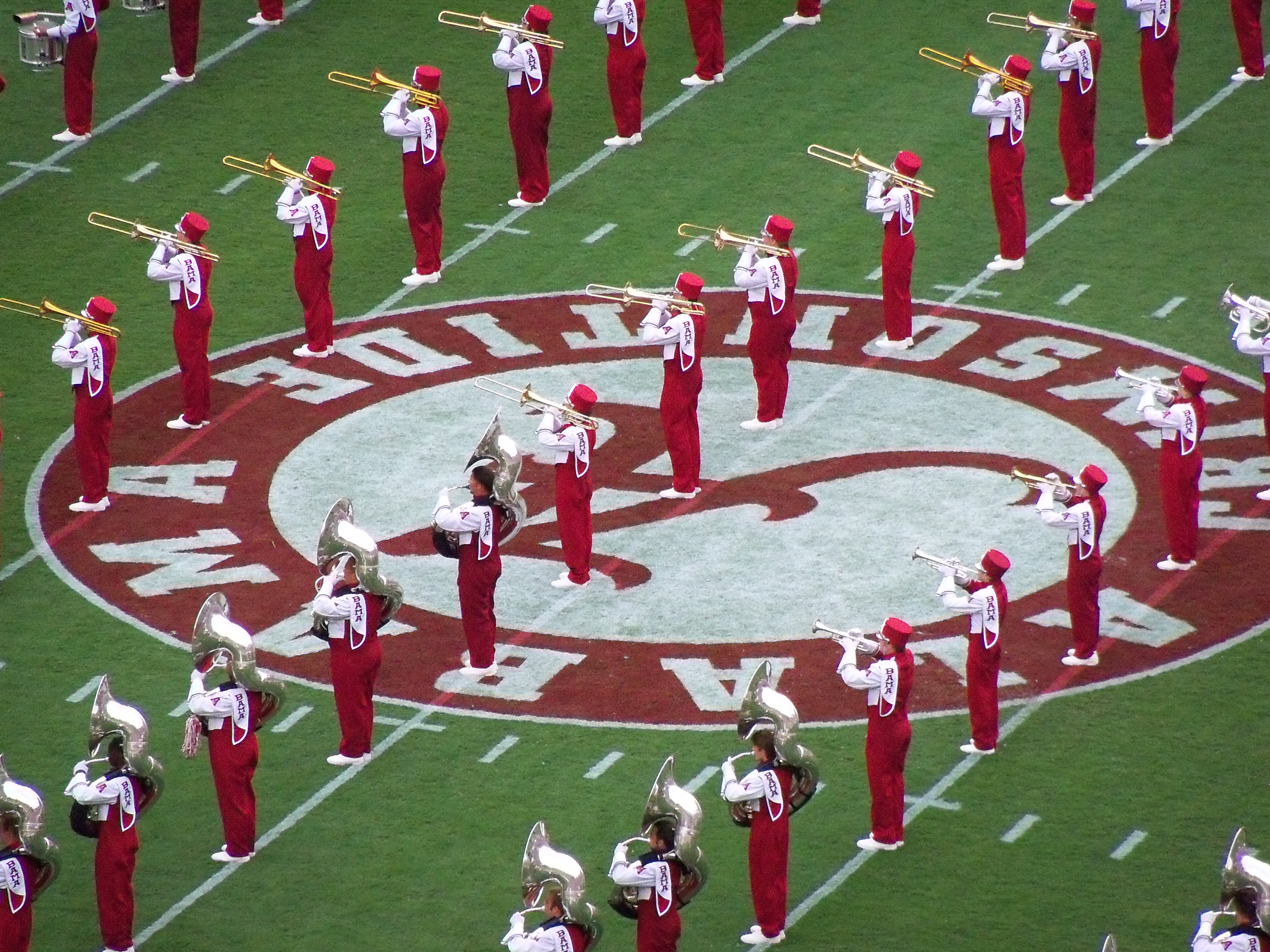
The band performing its pregame show prior to a football game in 2010.

The Million Dollar Band, which was first known simply as the "Alabama Band", was formed as a military band in 1912. In its first year, the band consisted of just 14 members under director Dr. Gustav Wittig, who was also an engineering and physics professor at the university. He served as director for five years before stepping down; the band was then student-led until 1927, when Captain H. H. Turner took over as director. The story of how the band earned its name is contested, but the account recognized by the university (released in the 1948 football media guide) is as follows: during the 1922 football season, Alabama visited Georgia Tech and got blown out, 33–7. Champ Pickens, a notable Alabama alumnus who was present at the game, was asked by a local sportswriter, "You don't have much of a team, what do you have at Alabama?". In response, Pickens quipped, "A million dollar band." His inspiration for the term came from his observation of the impressive effort the small band had put into soliciting funds from local merchants in order to accompany the football team to off-campus games.

In 1936, Colonel Carleton K. Butler (for whom the band's practice field is named) took over the band and led it to national prominence among collegiate marching bands. Colonel Butler was known as the "Father of the Million Dollar Band." The 1935 football season was one of rebuilding for the Crimson Tide. The previous season had produced a national title but gone were All-Americans Bill Lee, Dixie Howell, and Don Hudson. There were, however, two men that would become significant forces in the Alabama tradition on campus that year. Paul W. Bear Bryant was entering his senior season as an Alabama player while Carleton K. Butler was beginning his first season as director of the Million Dollar Band. Butler came to the university in 1935 and stayed until his retirement in 1969. Although the band was already an integral part of the Bama tradition, Butler would lead them to a higher level of prominence. Like Bryant, Colonel Butler's trademarks were discipline and sacrifice. The title of Colonel was an honorary distinction awarded by the ROTC in 1938. During Colonel Butler's tenure, the Million Dollar Band performed at 14 bowl games, appeared on numerous television broadcasts, represented the University at three governor's inaugurations and performed at the 1949 inauguration of President Harry S. Truman. His bands became famous for their precise marching formations, including the correct time, temperature, and even the score of the game. Majorettes were not allowed in his bands, but a coed sponsor led each march carrying a bouquet of roses. The Colonel also served as an instructor in the Music Department and helped train many music students who would hold positions as high school and college band directors throughout the nation. During World War II he directed many area high school and military bands in addition to his duties with the University of Alabama's marching band. He also played the oboe in the Birmingham Civic Symphony and authored numerous books and professional articles on music. After Colonel Butler's retirement in 1969, he and his wife moved to Asheville, North Carolina, where he lived until his death in 1993. Under Colonel Butler's guidance, the Million Dollar Band attained national acclaim and many honors, prompting former UA President Roger Sayers to say in an article for the Crimson White,"What Paul W. Bryant was to Alabama football, Colonel Carleton K. Butler was to Alabama's music program and bands."

Butler remained director for 33 years. Earl Dunn took charge in 1969. After Dunn's two-year stint at the Capstone, Dr. James "Doc" Ferguson was named director, where he remained until 1983. Under Ferguson, the MDB expanded to around 300 musicians, color guard and Crimsonettes (the majorettes). Alabama coach Paul "Bear" Bryant often voiced his support for the band during his tenure, sometimes partially crediting it after victories. After the tenure of Dr. Ferguson, assistant director Kathryn Scott was promoted to director. Scott was the first female marching band director at a Division I school. Scott changed the band's marching style to corps style, as opposed to traditional marching. Scott often included pyrotechnics in halftime performances. The Atlanta Pipe Band was included in her final halftime show, called "Halftime of a Lifetime." Dr. Kenneth Ozzello has been in charge of the band since 2002, as has overseen the MDB's expansion to nearly 400 students. One year after he was named director, the band won the Sudler Trophy, awarded by the John Philip Sousa Foundation. Ozzello continues the corps style and helped cement the pregame show as one of the most iconic in the country. A staple of pregame is "The Big Bama Spell Out" as well as "Tusk" when the band forms an elephant and marches down the field.

=== Directors ===
Name	Years
Dr. Gustav Wittig	1912–1918
None (Student-led)	1918–1927
Cpt. H. H. Turner	1927–1934
Col. Carleton K. Butler	1935–1968
Earl Dunn	1969–1971
Dr. James Ferguson	1971–1983
Kathryn B. Scott	1984–2002
Dr. Kenneth Ozzello	2003–present

== Traditions ==
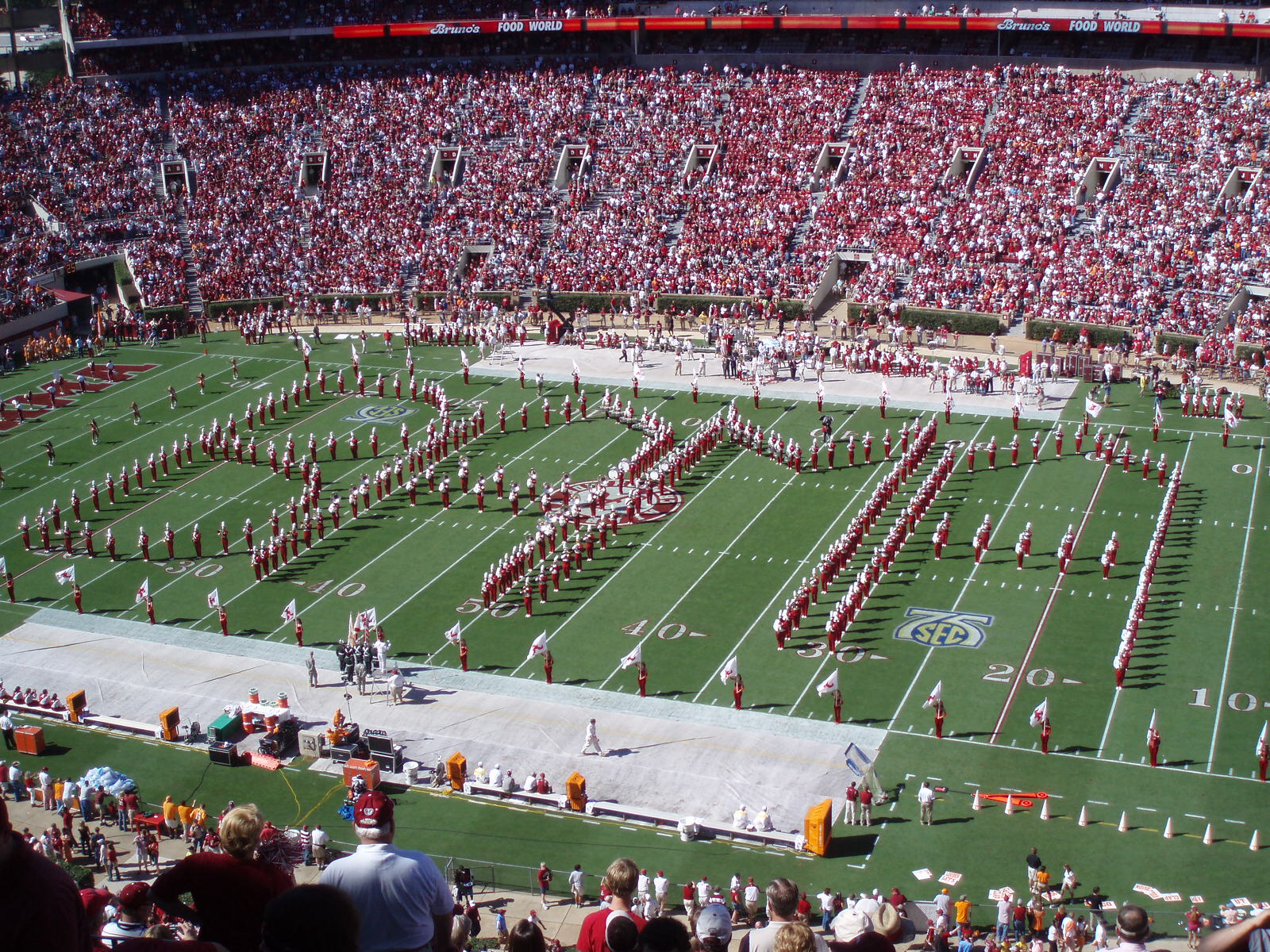
The band performing a "Booming Big Bama Spell Out" before a football game

- Alma Mater - Dr. Ozzello became director in 2003 and started this MDB tradition of singing the Alma Mater after every Friday/gameday rehearsal, as well as after every game, win or lose.
- Band Dismissal - At the end of every single rehearsal, game, etc. someone shouts "What do we say at Alabama?". The Leadership team responds with "Go Bama!" and then all members shout "Roll Tide!" This is similar to a scene from the 1995 movie Crimson Tide.
- Elephant Stomp - Prior to every home game the MDB performs the elephant stomp. Each section warms up then meets on the steps of the Gorgas library. The MDB and cheerleaders lead the crowd in several cheers in a short pep rally, usually lasting less than 10 minutes. The MDB then lines up on Colonial Drive and marches to Bryant–Denny Stadium.
- Big B-A-M-A Spellout - During the Pregame show, the PA announcer directs the crowd to shoutout 'B', 'A', 'M', 'A' while the band forms the block letters on the field.

== Songs and cheers ==
- Yea Alabama - The University of Alabama's official fight song.
- Tusk - This song was recorded by Fleetwood Mac in collaboration with the University of Southern California Trojan Marching Band at Dodger Stadium. From the Fleetwood Mac version, "Tusk" being shorthand for the university's home city of Tuscaloosa, accompanied by the school's dancing elephant mascot, Big Al. The band forms a large elephant on the field, with Big AL being introduced to the crowd of 100,000+ fans.
- Rammer Jammer Cheer - (informally known as the "Ole Miss Cheer" or “O cheer”) is played at the end-of-the game, after the team has won the game. Dr. Ferguson introduced the cheer to the band in 1981. The lyrics to the cheer were based upon the Ole Miss' Hotty Toddy cheer, the school which Dr. Ferguson was teaching at prior to coming to Bama.
- Basket Case - Beginning in mid-1996, the Million Dollar Band began playing a Fred Chang arrangement of the Green Day song "Basket Case" in the break between the 3rd and 4th quarters. This continued until midway through the 2006 season, when the Marketing Department decided to play "Sweet Home Alabama" over the PA system instead. The MDB continued to play the song, just at different points of the game. "Sweet Home Alabama" was still played during 2007 up to the Houston game. Since that game the MDB has played "Basketcase" during the 4th quarter break once again.
- Low Rider - Song played by the Trombone section in the fourth quarter of the football game. It has been in existence since at least 1986, when it was recorded on an LP. Mark Foster wrote the arrangement from a similar version that was played at his high school.
- Defense Cheer # 1 - Since 2002, the band has used the song "Look Down" from the musical Les Misérables as the main defense cheer. This arrangement was taken from the 1996 "Les Miserables" Halftime Show. The band currently has six defense cheers.
- The band also plays upon occasion You Can Call Me Al, the theme from the TV show The A-Team (1983-1987) and My Home's in Alabama from the country group, Alabama.

== Band recordings ==
- Million Dollar Band LP - [1976] Under the direction of Dr. James S. Ferguson.
- Million Dollar Band LP - [1986]
- Million Dollar Band CD - [1993] The band's first professional produced CD.
- Million Dollar Band CD - [1998]
- Million Dollar Band CD - [2002] Tribute CD to Kathryn Scott's career as director of the MDB.
- Million Dollar Band CD - [2003–present] Under the direction of Dr. Ken Ozzello, the band produces a CD every year which includes the three halftime performances of that year, pregame music, stand tunes, and other school songs.
- Videos
- 1969
- 1975
- 1982
- 1983
- 1990 Gospel Show
- 1991 Rock, Roll Tide, and Remembrance Show
- 1992 Tour of the World Show
- 1992 Salute to Hollywood Show
- 1992 Detective Show
- 1993 Night Club Show
- 1993 Gospel Show
- 1994 Big Band Show
- 1994 Movie Show
- 1994 Western Show
- 1995 Fiddler on the Roof Show
- 1995 Salute to the 60's Show
- 1996 Les Misérables Show

== Appearances ==
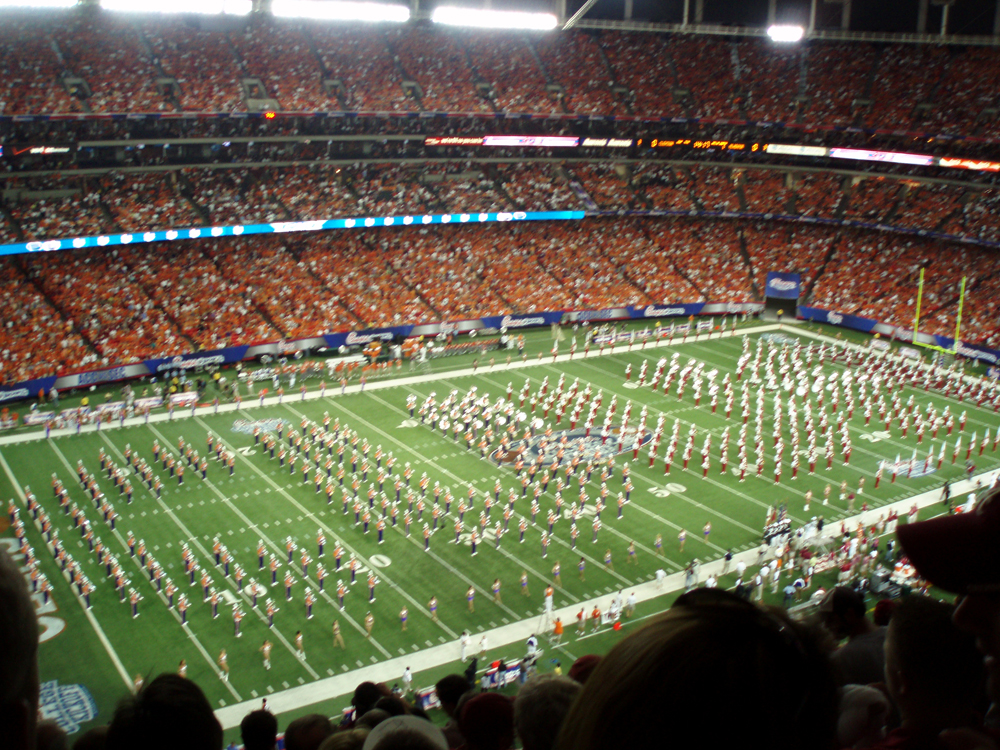
The MDB performs side-by-side with the Clemson marching band prior to the 2008 Chick-fil-A College Kickoff.

=== Paul Bryant years (1958–1982) ===
- 1966 Orange Bowl - Miami, FL - January 1966
- 1967 Sugar Bowl - New Orleans, LA - January 1967 - MDB accompanied trumpeter Al Hirt at halftime at Tulane Stadium. Hirt later appeared in the first Super Bowl
- 1968 Cotton Bowl - Dallas, TX - January 1968
- 1968 Gator Bowl - Jacksonville, FL - December 1968
- 1969 Liberty Bowl - Memphis, TN - December 1969
- 1972 Orange Bowl - Miami, FL - January 1972
- 1973 Sugar Bowl - New Orleans, LA - December 1973
- 1975 Orange Bowl - Miami, FL - January 1975
- 1975 Sugar Bowl - New Orleans, LA - December 1975 - First Sugar Bowl in the Louisiana Superdome
- 1976 Liberty Bowl - Memphis, TN - December 1976 - Wind chill: 11 degrees F (NY Times)
- 1978 Sugar Bowl - New Orleans, LA - January 1978
- 1979 Sugar Bowl - New Orleans, LA - January 1979
- 1980 Sugar Bowl - New Orleans, LA - January 1980
- 1981 Cotton Bowl - Dallas, TX - January 1981
- 1982 Cotton Bowl - Dallas, TX - January 1982
- 1982 Liberty Bowl - Memphis, TN - December 1982

=== Gene Stalling years (1990–1996) ===
- 1994 SEC Championship Game - Atlanta, GA - December 1994 - First time the band performed in the Georgia Dome
- 1995 Florida Citrus Bowl & Parade - Orlando, FL - Dec/Jan 1995
- 1995 Fob James Governor Inaugural Parade - Montgomery, AL - January 1995
- 1996 SEC Championship Game - Atlanta, GA - December 1996
- 1997 Outback Bowl - Tampa, FL - January 1997

=== Mike Dubose years (1997–2000) ===
- 1998 Music City Bowl - Nashville, TN - December 1997 - Inaugural Music City Bowl
- 1999 SEC Championship Game - Atlanta, GA - December 1999
- 2000 Orange Bowl & Parade - Miami, FL - Dec '99/Jan 2000
- 2000 Senior Bowl - Ladd–Peebles Stadium; Mobile, AL - January 2000 - First Senior Bowl performance by the band
- 2000 Knights of Revelry (KOR) Mardi Gras Parade - Mobile, AL - February 2000
- 2000 Alabama vs. UCLA football game - Pasadena, CA - Pep Band of the "Million Dollar Band" first ever performance at the famed Rose Bowl Stadium

=== Dennis Franchione years (2001–2002) ===
- 2001 Independence Bowl - Shreveport, LA - December 2001
- 2001 Knights of Revelry (KOR) Mardi Gras Parade - Mobile, AL - February 2001

=== Mike Shula years (2003–2006) ===
- 2003 Bob Riley Governor Inaugural Parade - Montgomery, AL - January 2003
- 2004 Music City Bowl - Nashville, TN - December 2004
- 2005 ESPN "Cold Pizza" on the UA Quad - Tuscaloosa, AL - November 2005

=== Saban years (2007–2024) ===
The Million Dollar Band plays music in between plays during the 2026 Rose Bowl.

- 2006 Senior Bowl - Ladd–Peebles Stadium; Mobile, AL - January 2006
- 2007 Bob Riley Inaugural Parade - Montgomery, AL - January 2007
- 2007 ESPN "Gameday" on the UA Quad - Tuscaloosa, AL - September 2007
- 2007 Bands of America Super Regional - Georgia Dome; Atlanta, GA - October 2007
- 2008 Senior Bowl - Ladd-Peebles Stadium; Mobile, AL - January 2008
- 2008 SEC Championship Game - Atlanta, GA - December 2008
- 2009 Senior Bowl - Ladd–Peebles Stadium; Mobile, AL - January 2009
- 2009 SEC Championship Game - Atlanta, GA - December 2009
- 2010 BCS National Championship Game - Pasadena, CA - January 2010 - First Full Band performance at the Rose Bowl Stadium
- 2012 SEC Championship Game - Atlanta, GA - December 2012
- 2012 BCS National Championship Game - New Orleans, LA
- 2013 BCS National Championship Game - Miami Gardens, FL - January 2013
- 2014 Sugar Bowl - New Orleans, LA - January 2014
- 2014 SEC Championship Game - Atlanta, GA - December 2014
- 2015 Sugar Bowl - New Orleans, LA - January 2015
- 2015 SEC Championship Game - Atlanta, GA - December 2015
- 2015 Cotton Bowl Classic (December) - Arlington, TX - December 2015
- 2016 College Football Playoff National Championship - Phoenix, AZ - January 2016
- 2016 SEC Championship Game - Atlanta, GA - December 2016
- 2016 Peach Bowl - Atlanta, GA - December 2016
- 2017 College Football Playoff National Championship - Tampa, FL - January 2017
- 2017 Bands of America Grand National Championship - Lucas Oil Stadium - Indianapolis, Indiana in November 2017
- 2018 Sugar Bowl - New Orleans, LA - January 2018
- 2018 College Football Playoff National Championship - Atlanta, GA - January 2018
- 2018 Orange Bowl - Miami Gardens, FL - December 27, 2018
- 2019 College Football Playoff National Championship - Santa Clara, CA - January 7, 2019
- 2019 Senior Bowl - Ladd-Peebles Stadium; Mobile, AL - January 2019
- 2021 Macy's Thanksgiving Day Parade - New York, NY - November 25, 2021
- 2021 SEC Championship Game - Atlanta, GA - December 4, 2021
- 2021 Cotton Bowl Classic - Arlington, TX - December 31, 2021
- 2022 College Football Playoff National Championship - Lucas Oil Stadium - Indianapolis, IN - January 10, 2022
- 2022 Sugar Bowl - New Orleans, LA - December 31, 2022
- 2023 Bands of America Grand National Championship - Indianapolis, IN - November 10, 2023
- 2023 SEC Championship Game - Atlanta, GA - December 2, 2023
- 2024 Rose Parade - Pasadena, CA - January 1, 2024
- 2024 Rose Bowl - Pasadena, CA - January 1, 2024
