= T-Rac =

Mascot of Tennessee Titans football team

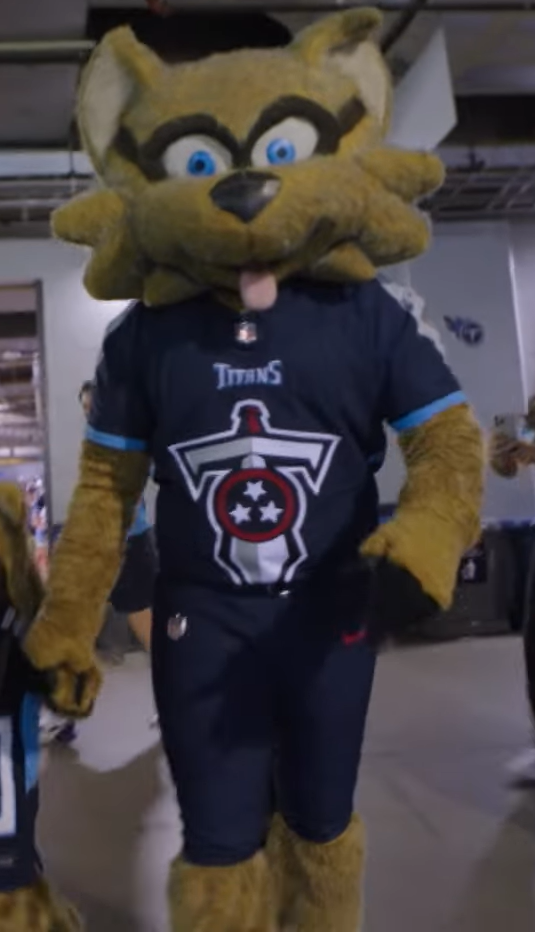
T-Rac in 2024

T-Rac is the mascot of the NFL's Tennessee Titans. He is a raccoon, the state animal of Tennessee.

== History ==
T-Rac made his debut during the team's inaugural preseason home game in August 1999 against the Atlanta Falcons as the Titans, who were previously known as the Houston Oilers from 1960 to 1996 and the Tennessee Oilers from 1997 to 1998. He was first played by Pete Nelson, who played the character for 17 years before retiring from the position before the 2016 NFL season.

T-Rac changed his classic look on August 7, 2026.

T-Rac has over 68,000 followers on Facebook, over 9,300 followers on Twitter, and over 15,400 followers on Instagram. In 2011, T-Rac won the title of "Most Awesome Mascot," presented by Cartoon Network's inaugural "Hall of Games." In that contest, T-Rac was pitted against the Gorilla from the NBA's Phoenix Suns, Bango from the NBA's Milwaukee Bucks, and Phillie Phanatic from MLB's Philadelphia Phillies.

== Appearances ==
T-Rac appears at every Tennessee Titans home game at Nissan Stadium. T-Rac has been known to zip-line from the top of the stadium and rappel from buildings in downtown Nashville. The mascot also travels throughout Tennessee and parts of southern Kentucky to appear in community events, birthday parties, and NFL Play60 programs.

T-Rac also appeared on the season 2 premiere of The Titan Games on NBC. He was there to lend support to Bartley Weaver, who portrays the Greek warrior mascot at Titans games.
