= Tennessee Titans =

NFL team in Nashville, Tennessee

- Current season
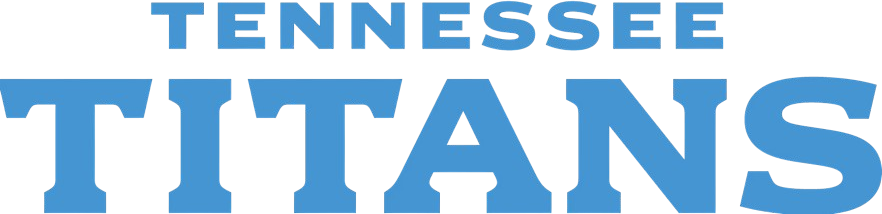
Logo	Wordmark
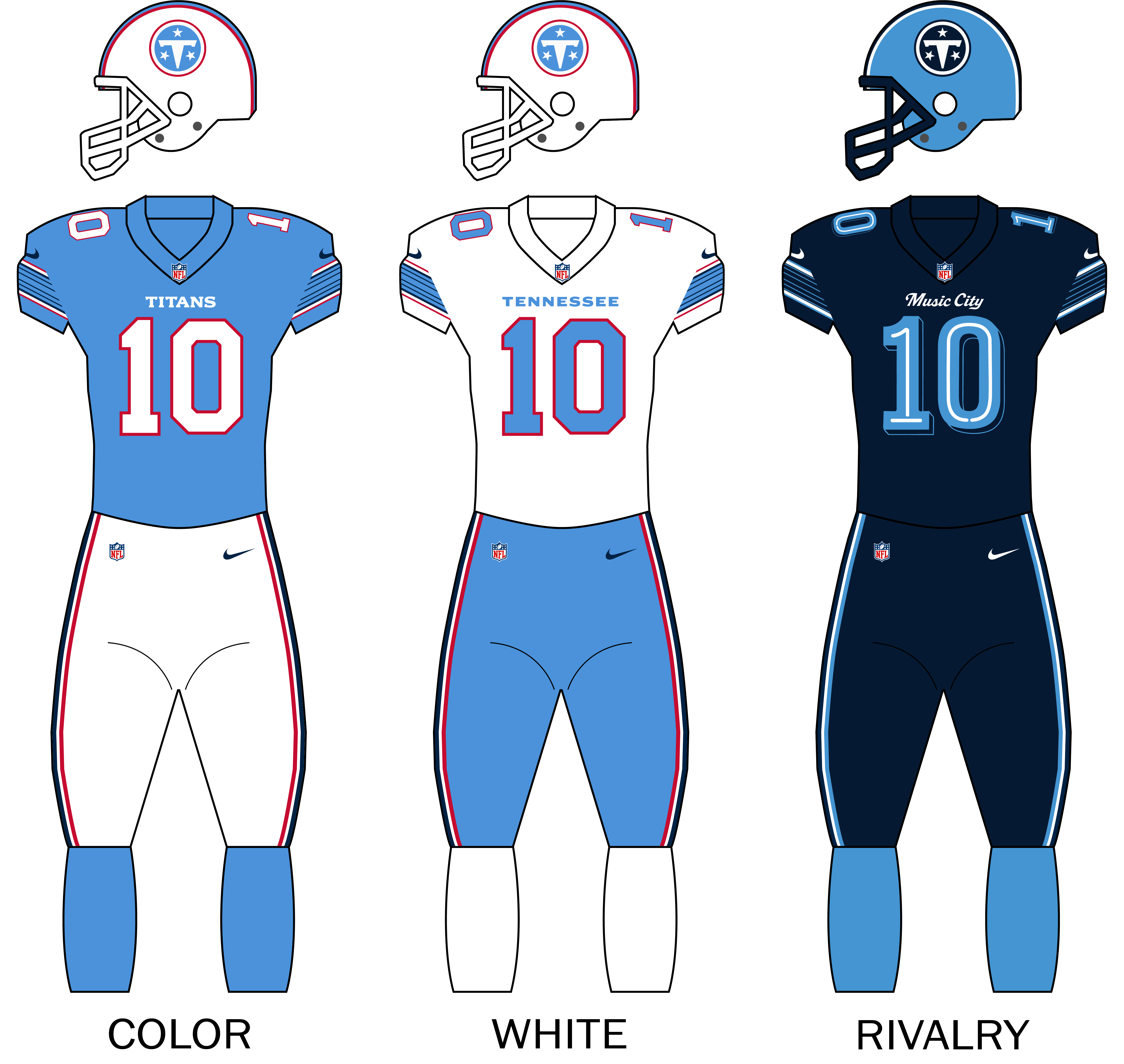
- Uniforms

General information
- Founded: August 14, 1959; 67 years ago
- Stadium: Nissan Stadium; Nashville, Tennessee
- Headquartered: Vanderbilt Health Football Center; Nashville, Tennessee
- Colors: Titans blue, red, white, navy blue
- Mascot: T-Rac
- Website: tennesseetitans.com

Personnel
- Owner: Adams family
- General manager: Mike Borgonzi
- Head coach: Robert Saleh
- President: Burke Nihill

Team history
- Houston Oilers (1960–1996); Tennessee Oilers (1997–1998); Tennessee Titans (1999–present)

Home fields
- Jeppesen Stadium (1960–1964); Rice Stadium (1965–1967); Houston Astrodome (1968–1996); Liberty Bowl Memorial Stadium (1997); Vanderbilt Stadium (1998); Nissan Stadium (1999–present); New Nissan Stadium (2027)

League / conference affiliations
- American Football League: Eastern Division (1960–1969); National Football League (1970–present): American Football Conference (1970–present); AFC Central (1970–2001); AFC South (2002–present)

Championships
- League championships: 2: AFL championships (1960, 1961)
- Conference championships: 1: AFC: 1999
- Division championships: 11: AFL Eastern: 1960, 1961, 1962, 1967; AFC Central: 1991, 1993, 2000; AFC South: 2002, 2008, 2020, 2021

Playoff appearances (25)
- AFL: 1960, 1961, 1962, 1967, 1969; NFL: 1978, 1979, 1980, 1987, 1988, 1989, 1990, 1991, 1992, 1993, 1999, 2000, 2002, 2003, 2007, 2008, 2017, 2019, 2020, 2021

Owners
- Bud Adams (1959–2013); Amy Adams Strunk (2013–present)

The Tennessee Titans are a professional American football team based in Nashville, Tennessee. The Titans compete in the National Football League (NFL) as a member of the American Football Conference (AFC) South division. The Titans play their home games at Nissan Stadium; the team will be scheduled to move to an indoor stadium with the same name in 2027.

Originally known as the Houston Oilers, the team was founded in 1959 by Houston oil tycoon Bud Adams, who remained the owner until his death in 2013. The team began play in 1960 in Houston, Texas, as a charter member of the American Football League (AFL). The Oilers won the first two AFL championships along with four division titles, and joined the NFL as part of the AFL–NFL merger in 1970. The Oilers made playoff appearances from 1978 to 1980 and from 1987 to 1993, with Hall of Famers Earl Campbell and Warren Moon, respectively.

In 1997, the Oilers moved to Nashville, Tennessee, playing at Liberty Bowl Memorial Stadium in Memphis, Tennessee, for one season while waiting for a new stadium to be constructed. The team moved to Nashville's Vanderbilt Stadium in 1998. For those two seasons, the team was known as the Tennessee Oilers, but changed its name to the Titans for the 1999 season, when they moved into Adelphia Coliseum, now known as Nissan Stadium. The Titans' training facility is in Saint Thomas Sports Park, a 31-acre site at the MetroCenter complex in Nashville.

The Titans played in Super Bowl XXXIV in 2000, losing 23–16 to the St. Louis Rams. Led by Steve McNair and Eddie George, they made the playoffs in all but one season from 1999 to 2003, but only twice in the next 13 years. From 2016 to 2021, the Titans had six consecutive winning seasons and four playoff appearances. The Titans are the only NFL team to have two players rush for 2,000 yards in a season: Chris Johnson (2009) and Derrick Henry (2020).

== History ==
=== Houston Oilers ===
After failed attempts to start an NFL expansion team in Houston, Texas, Bud Adams founded the Houston Oilers in 1959 as one of the eight charter members of the upstart American Football League (AFL) and a member of its Eastern Division. Beginning play at Jeppesen Stadium at the University of Houston, the team moved to Rice Stadium at Rice University in 1965. Led by quarterback George Blanda, who played with the team from 1960 to 1966, the Houston Oilers made it to each of the first three AFL championship games. The Oilers won the first two AFL championships, both against the San Diego Chargers, but lost the 1962 American Football League Championship Game 20–17 to the Dallas Texans, now Kansas City Chiefs, after double overtime. The Houston Oilers failed to post a winning season in the next six seasons, but in 1967, a 9–4–1 record returned the team to the AFL championship game where it lost 40–7 to the Oakland Raiders. The Houston Oilers moved into the Astrodome after the season, becoming the first professional football team to move into an indoor stadium. After failing to qualify for the AFL playoffs in 1968, the Oilers qualified the following season in 1969, but were eliminated in the divisional round by the Oakland Raiders in a 56–7 blowout.

Following the season, the AFL merged with the NFL in 1970, with the Houston Oilers being assigned to the new American Football Conference (AFC)'s Central division. The Houston Oilers failed to qualify for the NFL playoffs from 1970 to 1977, and posted one winning season in 1975. In 1978, the Houston Oilers selected running back Earl Campbell with the first overall pick in the 1978 NFL draft. Campbell led the team to three consecutive playoff appearances as a wildcard berth from 1978 to 1980. Campbell led the NFL in rushing yards and won the Offensive Player of the Year Award in each of those three seasons. The Oilers made it to the AFC championships in 1978 and 1979, but were defeated both times by the Pittsburgh Steelers.

The Houston Oilers failed to post a winning record between 1981 and 1986, a drought that ended when the Houston Oilers acquired quarterback Warren Moon in 1987. With Moon and Hall of Fame offensive linemen Mike Munchak and Bruce Matthews, the Houston Oilers made seven consecutive playoff appearances from 1987 to 1993. During the 1992–93 NFL playoffs, the Houston Oilers earned the dubious distinction of being on the losing end of what was then the biggest comeback in NFL history when in the divisional round, the Houston Oilers' third-quarter 32-point lead against the Buffalo Bills turned into a 41–38 loss in overtime. This remains the largest blown lead in playoff history. After the 1993 season, Moon was traded to the Minnesota Vikings and Munchak retired to begin a coaching career. The following season, the Oilers finished with a league-worst 2–14 season, and Jack Pardee was fired as head coach after a 1–9 start and was succeeded by Jeff Fisher. The following two seasons, the Oilers drafted quarterback Steve McNair and running back Eddie George respectively, who became franchise players over the next several years. The Oilers respectively went 7–9 and 8–8 in their final two seasons in Houston.

=== Tennessee Oilers ===
After the 1995 season, Bud Adams announced the move to Tennessee. A Nashville stadium for the Tennessee Oilers would not be ready until 1999, so the Tennessee Oilers planned to play two seasons at Liberty Bowl Memorial Stadium in Memphis, Tennessee. The team was based in Nashville and commuted to Memphis, Tennessee for games.

Games in Memphis had some of the lowest NFL attendance since the 1950s. The first seven games of the season saw attendance below 27,000 people, and two games drew fewer than 18,000.

For the 1998 season, the Tennessee Oilers played their home games at the stadium on the campus of Vanderbilt University in Nashville, Tennessee. That year, the team was in playoff contention until losing their last two games for another 8–8 record. The Tennessee Oilers were 6–2 in Nashville and 2–6 on the road.

=== Tennessee Titans ===
During the 1998 offseason, Adams appointed an advisory committee to decide on a new name for the Tennessee Oilers to coincide with the opening of their new stadium, which was renamed Nissan Stadium in 2015. On November 14, 1998, the new name of Tennessee Titans was unveiled. The name is a nod to how Nashville is nicknamed the "Athens of the South" for its classical architecture and large number of higher learning institutions.

The 1999 season marked a remarkable beginning for the Titans, as they made a dramatic run to Super Bowl XXXIV. Led by head coach Jeff Fisher and quarterback Steve McNair, the team finished the regular season with a 13–3 record. Their playoff journey included the famous "Music City Miracle" victory over the Buffalo Bills, where a last-second lateral play resulted in a kickoff return touchdown. The Titans reached the Super Bowl but narrowly lost to the St. Louis Rams, falling one yard short of a potential game-tying touchdown.

In the years following their Super Bowl appearance, the Titans experienced mixed success. They reached the playoffs several times in the early 2000s, with standout performances from players like running back Eddie George and defensive end Jevon Kearse. However, the team struggled with consistency and faced multiple rebuilding phases. Following the departures of George and McNair in 2003 and 2005, respectively, the Titans drafted quarterback Vince Young in 2006, who led the team to a playoff berth in 2007. Despite being named Offensive Rookie of the Year in 2006 and being a two-time Pro Bowl selection, Young's tenure was marred by injuries, inconsistency and clashes with Jeff Fisher. In 2008, Young was benched in favor of veteran Kerry Collins, who led the Titans to a league best 13–3 record and a playoff appearance before being defeated in the divisional round of the playoffs to the Baltimore Ravens. In 2009, following a 0–6 start under Collins, Young returned as starting quarterback and led the Titans to winning eight of their final ten games and narrowly missing the playoffs. The 2009 season was also notable as it was the season in which second-year running back Chris Johnson became the sixth player to run for more than 2,000 yards in a season and broke Marshall Faulk's record for most single season yards from scrimmage. Johnson made three Pro Bowl appearances with the Titans before departing after the 2013 season. Following the 2010 season, Young, Collins and Fisher all departed and quarterback Jake Locker was drafted in 2011. After spending his rookie season as a backup, Locker's career as a starter beginning in 2012 was marked by inconsistent play and numerous injuries, which led to his retirement shortly after departing from the team after the 2014 season after a four-year career.

After posting a league-worst 2–14 record during the 2014 season, their worst since moving to Tennessee, the Titans drafted quarterback Marcus Mariota in the 2015 NFL Draft with the second overall pick, who became the Titans' franchise quarterback for the next four seasons. Although the Titans finished with another league worst record of 3–13 during the 2015 season, Mariota along with multi-Pro Bowl teammates such as tight end Delanie Walker, offensive tackle Taylor Lewan and defensive tackle/defensive end Jurrell Casey, led the Titans to three consecutive winning records of 9–7 from 2016 to 2018. During the 2017 season, the Titans returned to the playoffs for the first time since the 2008 and won their first playoff game since 2003, overcoming a 21–3 halftime deficit against the Kansas City Chiefs to win 22–21 before being eliminated in the divisional round. The Titans saw their season end in the Divisional Round with a 35–14 loss to the New England Patriots. Despite their postseason success in the 2017 season, the Titans moved on from head coach Mike Mularkey.

==== Mike Vrabel era ====
The Titans entered a new era in the late 2010s with the hiring of head coach Mike Vrabel in 2018. Prominent players drafted during the 2019 season included defensive end Jeffery Simmons and wide receiver A. J. Brown, both of whom would later have prolific careers with the team. Under Vrabel's leadership, during the 2019 season, Mariota was benched in favor of offseason trade acquisition Ryan Tannehill after a 2–4 start and with the emergence running back Derrick Henry, who led the NFL in rushing yards and rushing touchdowns, the team returned to prominence. The Titans reached the AFC Championship Game during the 2019 season. Mariota, Walker and Casey all departed after the 2019 season.

Derrick Henry won the Offensive Player of the Year Award in 2020 after rushing for 2,000 yards. Henry was part of a 2020 campaign that saw the Titans win the AFC South with an 11–5 record. The Titans' season ended with a 20–13 loss to the Baltimore Ravens in the Wild Card Round.

In the 2021 season, the Titans finished with a 12–5 record, won the AFC South, and got a first round bye. The Titans' season ended with a Divisional Round 19–16 loss to the Cincinnati Bengals. The Titans traded away Brown after the season. In 2022, the Titans suffered their first losing season since 2015 with a 7–10 mark, losing each of their last seven games despite a 7–3 start. In the 2023 season, the Titans finished with a 6–11 record. Following the 2023 season, Vrabel was fired as head coach. Former Bengals offensive coordinator Brian Callahan was hired to be the team's head coach before the 2024 season. Prominent departures that occurred during or after the 2023 season included Henry, Tannehill and two-time First-Team All-Pro safety Kevin Byard.

==== Brian Callahan/Mike McCoy era ====
2024 proved to be a difficult season for the Titans, as the Titans finished with a league-worst 3–14 record. 2023 second-round pick Will Levis struggled at quarterback, recording a 2–10 record as a starter. As a result, the Titans used the first pick of the 2025 NFL Draft to select quarterback Cam Ward. Despite Ward starting all 17 games in 2025, the Titans again finished with a 3–14 record. Head coach Brian Callahan was fired after the first six games, with offensive assistant Mike McCoy serving in an interim capacity through the end of the season.

==== Robert Saleh era ====
The Titans hired former San Francisco 49ers defensive coordinator and former New York Jets head coach Robert Saleh as their next coach on January 20, 2026.

== Logos and uniforms ==
The Tennessee Titans uniforms used from 1999 to 2017.

When the team debuted as the Houston Oilers in 1960, its logo was an oil rig derrick. Except for minor color changes throughout the years, this logo remained the same until the team was renamed the Titans in 1999. The logo was originally called "Ol' Riggy", but this name was dropped before the 1974 season.

The Oilers' uniforms consisted of blue or white jerseys, red trim, and white pants. From 1966 to 1971, the pants with both the blue and white jerseys were silver to match the color of the helmets. The team commonly wore light blue pants on the road with the white jerseys from 1972 to 1994, with the exception of the 1980 season, and selected games in the mid-1980s, when the team wore an all-white road combination. For selected games in 1973 and 1974, and again from 1981 through 1984, the Oilers wore their white jerseys at home. Coach Jeff Fisher discarded the light blue pants in 1995. From 1960 to about 1965 and from 1972 to 1974, the Oilers wore blue helmets; the helmets were silver from 1966 to 1971 and white from 1975 to 1998.

From 1997 to 1998, when it was known as the Tennessee Oilers, the team had an alternate logo that combined elements of the flag of Tennessee with the derrick. The team also wore its white uniforms during home games. In its two years as the Tennessee Oilers, the team wore its colored jerseys for road games against the Miami Dolphins and a Thanksgiving Day game against the Dallas Cowboys. It wore all white exclusively in its last year as the Tennessee Oilers.

When the team was renamed the Titans in 1999, it introduced a new logo that was a circle with three stars representing the state's Grand Divisions, containing a large "T" with a trail of flames similar to a comet. The uniforms consisted of white helmets, red trim, and either navy or white jerseys. White pants were worn with the navy jerseys, and navy pants with the white jerseys. On both the navy and white jerseys, the outside shoulders and sleeves were light Titans blue. In a game against the Washington Redskins on October 15, 2006, the Titans wore their navy jerseys with navy pants for the first time. Since 2000, the Titans have worn their dark uniforms at home. They have worn white at home during daytime contests in September home games to gain an advantage with the heat, except in the 2005, 2006 and 2008 seasons.

In 2003, the Titans introduced an alternate jersey that was light Titans blue with navy outside shoulders and sleeves, which was worn with blue pants. Until 2007, they wore the jersey twice in each regular-season game. They always wore the Titans blue jersey in their annual divisional game against the Houston Texans and for other selected home games. Their selection in those games was representative of the organization's ties to Houston and the AFL. On November 19, 2006, the Titans introduced light Titans blue pants in a game against the Philadelphia Eagles. In December 2006, they combined the Titans blue pants with the Titans blue jersey to create an all Titans blue uniform. Vince Young appeared in this uniform in the cover art for Madden NFL 08.

During the 2006 season, the Titans wore seven different uniform combinations, pairing the white jersey with all three sets of pants (white, Titans blue, navy blue), the navy jersey with the white and navy pants, and the Titans blue jersey with navy and Titans blue pants. In a game against the Atlanta Falcons on October 7, 2007, the Titans paired the navy blue jersey with the Titans blue pants for the first time. They wore the navy blue jerseys with the light blue pants against the Tampa Bay Buccaneers. The team paired the Titans blue jerseys with the white pants for the first time in a home game against the Indianapolis Colts on November 14, 2013. In 2008, the Titans blue jerseys became the regular home uniforms, with the navy blue jerseys being relegated to alternate status but not worn until 2013.

In 2009, the Titans and the Buffalo Bills began the 2009 NFL preseason in the Hall of Fame Game. Played at Canton's Pro Football Hall of Fame Field at Fawcett Stadium on August 9, 2009, the game was nationally televised on NBC. The Titans defeated the Bills, 21–18. In honor of the AFL's 50th anniversary, the Titans wore Oilers' uniforms for the game. In 2009, the team honored former quarterback Steve McNair by placing a small, navy blue disc on the back of their helmets with McNair's white number nine inside of it.

In 2013, the team wore the navy blue jerseys twice in honor of their 15th anniversary as the Titans. The Titans wore white jerseys for all games in 2014, for the exceptions of two preseason home games, in which the team wore their light Titans blue jerseys, and a game against the Houston Texans on October 26, 2014, in which the Titans wore their navy blue uniforms.

Beginning in 2015, navy blue became the team's primary home jersey color again, marking the first time since 2007 that the Titans wore navy as their primary home jersey. The light Titans blue jersey, which was the team's primary jersey color from 2008 to 2014, became the team's alternate jersey for a second time.

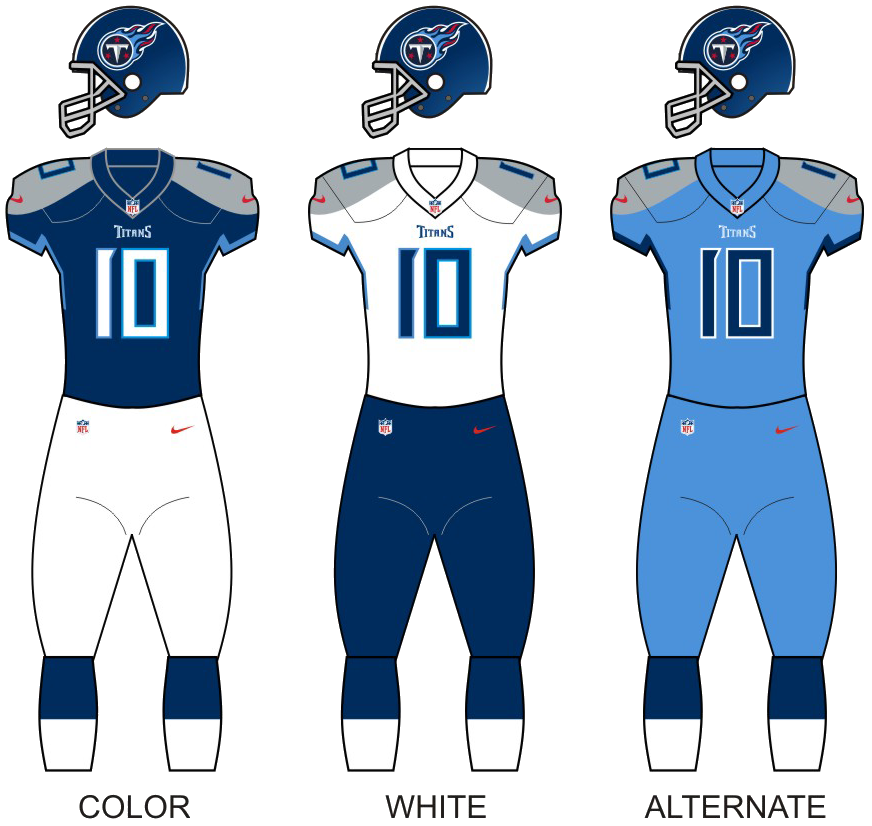
The Tennessee Titans uniforms used from 2018 to 2025.

On April 4, 2018, the Titans debuted new uniforms that retain the color palette of navy blue, Titans blue and white, with new red and silver elements being introduced. The new helmets are navy blue with one silver sword-shaped stripe through the center and metallic gray face masks.

On July 23, 2023, the Titans unveiled the throwback powder blue Oilers uniforms.

On March 27, 2025, the light Titans blue jersey was reinstated as the team's primary home jersey. In addition, the Oilers throwback uniform was not worn this season. The previous navy blue uniform, despite being relegated to an alternate, was not worn all season. The standard uniform combinations will be cream blue with navy blue pants at home and white jersey with cream blue/white pants on the road.

On March 12, 2026, the Titans unveiled a new logo along with new uniforms. These reference the team's historic roots and colors. Titans blue is their current primary color, with white, red and navy blue being secondary colors. Additionally, the Titans unveiled a "Rivalries" uniform on August 25, featuring navy blue jerseys and pants along with Titans blue helmet and lettering, heavily inspired by Nashville's nickname of "Music City". The Titans would wear the uniform once per season at home against the other AFC South teams.

== Rivalries ==
The Titans share rivalries with their three AFC South opponents, Jacksonville Jaguars, Houston Texans, and Indianapolis Colts. They have historical rivalries with former divisional opponents such as the Pittsburgh Steelers, Baltimore Ravens, and Buffalo Bills.

=== Divisional ===
==== Jacksonville Jaguars ====
The rivalry with the Jaguars began in 1995 when the Titans were the Houston Oilers. The rivalry was heated in the late 1990s and early 2000s due to the success of both franchises at the time, including a season in which Jacksonville went 14–2 and Tennessee went 13–3. That season, all three of Jacksonville's losses, including the playoffs, came against the Titans, who played that year in Super Bowl XXXIV. The rivalry cooled when both teams experienced misfortune in the late 2000s to early 2010s, but both teams ended lengthy playoff droughts in 2017. As of the 2024 season, the Titans lead the all-time series 35–26.

==== Houston Texans ====
The Titans’ rivalry with the Houston Texans is more prevalent in Houston due to the Titans having previously played in the city. The Titans dominated the rivalry in the early 2000s, but the series has since evened out in the 2010s. As of the 2025 season, the all-time series is tied, 24–24.

==== Indianapolis Colts ====
Since the creation of the AFC South, the Titans and the Colts have been division rivals. In 2011, the Titans swept the Colts after 11 straight losses. In 2018, the Colts defeated the Titans in the last game of the regular season to clinch the final Wild Card spot, eliminating Tennessee from playoff contention. In 2020, the Titans claimed the AFC South championship over the Colts due to tie-breaking measures. As of the 2024 season, the Colts lead the all-time series 39–22.

=== Conference ===
==== Buffalo Bills ====
While in the AFL, the Houston Oilers were in the same division as the Buffalo Bills, with the two teams combining for four AFL titles, but the Oilers were moved to the AFC Central division following the NFL-AFL merger. Their rivalry remained strong into the 1980s and 1990s with Warren Moon leading the Oilers against Jim Kelly and the Bills. Two of the most iconic playoff games in Oilers/Titans history have occurred against the Bills, specifically the Comeback in 1993, and the Music City Miracle on January 8, 2000. The Bills and Titans were featured in an AFL legacy game in 2009 as part of festivities commemorating the 50th anniversary of the AFL's foundation. Titans owner Bud Adams was fined $250,000 by the league following the 41–17 Titans win in which he obscenely gestured toward the Bills sideline. Adams and Bills owner Ralph Wilson had maintained a friendly rivalry and were the last living original AFL owners at that time. A brief resurgence of the rivalry based on shared success and mutual respect occurred between 2018 and 2022, as head coach Mike Vrabel and running back Derrick Henry led the Titans against Bills head coach Sean McDermott and quarterback Josh Allen. As of the 2024 season, the Titans lead the all-time series 30–21.

==== Baltimore Ravens ====
In the late 1990s and early 2000s, the Titans and the Ravens began a rivalry, which flared up when former Titans quarterback Steve McNair went to the Ravens. From the realignment of the NFL's divisions in 2002 to the 2020–21 NFL playoffs, the Titans have faced off against Baltimore five times in the postseason. Derrick Henry left the Titans in the 2024 offseason to play for the Ravens. As of the 2026 season, the Ravens lead the all-time series 15–13.

=== Historic ===
==== Pittsburgh Steelers ====
After the move to the AFC Central division, the Titans developed a rivalry with the Pittsburgh Steelers. The Steelers were the Oilers' primary divisional rival and by the 2020s, the Titans had played them more than any other NFL team. As of the 2024 season, the Steelers lead the all-time series 49–32.

=== Defunct ===
==== Texas Governor's Cup: Dallas Cowboys/Dallas Texans ====
The Cowboys previously led the series against the Oilers 18–13.

== Culture ==
=== Flameheads ===
During the Titans' first season in its new stadium, the end zone sections became known as the Flame Pit and fans began wearing headwear resembling flames. Called "Flameheads", the costumes became prevalent during the Titans' successful years of the early 2000s, especially during their run to Super Bowl XXXIV. Flames are tied to the organization because in Greek Mythology, the Titan Prometheus stole fire and gave it to humanity.

=== Cheerleaders and mascot ===
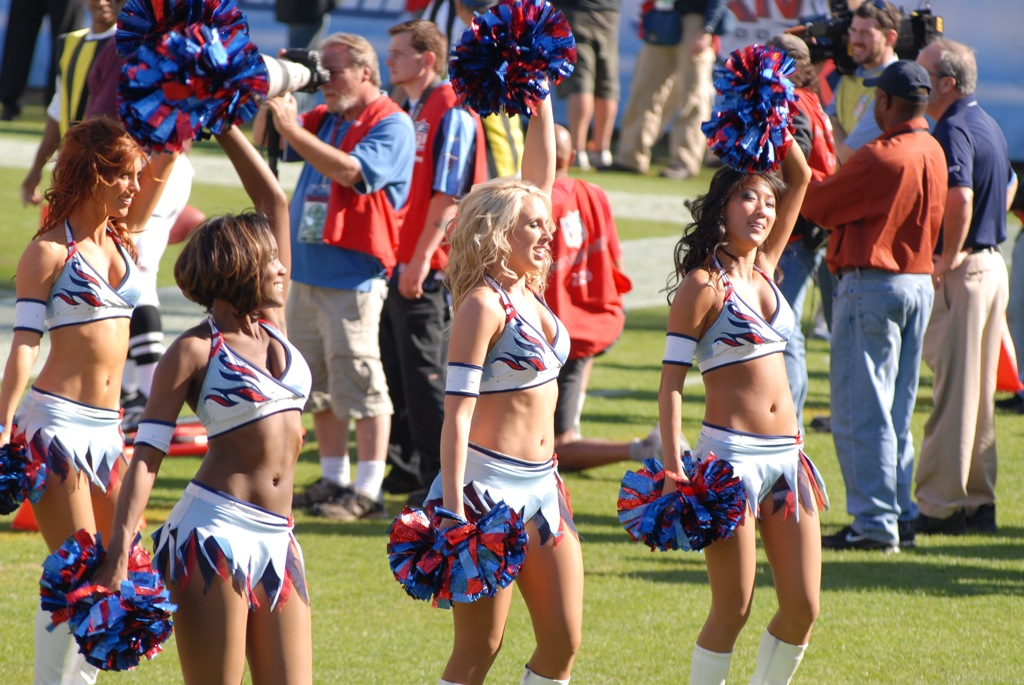
Cheerleaders cheering on the crowd during a home game.

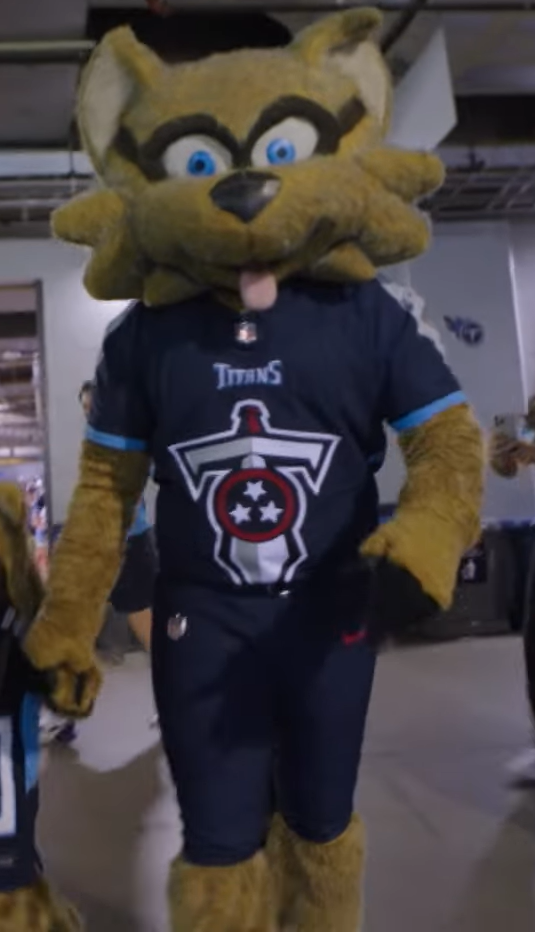
T-Rac, the mascot of the Tennessee Titans.

The Tennessee Titans Cheerleaders represent the team in the NFL. They perform at every home game in Nissan Stadium and regularly do acts with the team's mascot T-Rac. They have 28 members with four captains. They perform a variety of dance moves and high-risk stunts. They attend community events in Middle Tennessee.

T-Rac is the raccoon mascot of the Titans, debuting in the team's inaugural preseason home game in August 1999 against the Atlanta Falcons. The raccoon is the state animal of Tennessee. T-Rac appears at every game in Nissan Stadium and performs at community events in Tennessee.

=== Stadium traditions ===
During every home game's 4th quarter, the stadium plays a video of "office linebacker" Terry Tate, performed by Lester Speight, shouting his catchphrase, "the pain train's coming"! The phrase is followed by the playing of "Folsom Prison Blues" by Johnny Cash.

After every Titans first down at Nissan Stadium, the jumbotron plays a scene from the movie 300, where the Spartans chant after King Leonidas asks, "What is your profession?" Titans fans simultaneously perform the chant three times, "OOH! OOH! OOH!"

=== Titans Ring of Honor ===
In 1999, Adams established a Titans/Oilers Hall of Fame after the 40th season of the franchise to honor past players and management, with the first class being seven that were all inducted on December 9, 1999. It was changed to Oilers/Titans Ring of Honor in 2008. Bum Phillips, Jeff Fisher and Floyd Reese were inducted in 2021. Billy "White Shoes" Johnson in 2023, and Mike Keith in 2025 are the most recent inductees.

Oilers/Titans Ring of Honor
Players
Inductee	Position	Tenure	Year Inducted
Elvin Bethea	Defensive end	1968–1983	1999
George Blanda	Quarterback; Placekicker	1960–1966	1999
Earl Campbell	Running back	1978–1984	1999
Mike Holovak	Executive; Scout	1981–1999	1999
Ken Houston	Safety	1967–1972	1999
Mike Munchak	Guard	1982–1993	1999
Jim Norton	Safety; Punter	1960–1968	1999
Bruce Matthews	Guard; Center; Offensive tackle	1983–2001	2002
Warren Moon	Quarterback	1984–1993	2006
Bud Adams	Owner	1959–2013	2008
Eddie George	Running back	1996–2003	2008
Steve McNair	Quarterback	1995–2005	2008
Frank Wycheck	Tight end	1995–2003	2008
Robert Brazile	Linebacker	1975–1984	2018
Jeff Fisher	Head coach	1994–2010	2022
Bum Phillips	Head coach	1975–1980	2022
Floyd Reese	Coach/general manager	1986–2006	2022
Billy "White Shoes" Johnson	Kick returner	1974–1980	2023
Mike Keith	Play-by-play announcer	1998–2024	2025
Chris Johnson	Running Back	2008–2013	2026

== Season-by-season records ==
Since their first season in 1960, the Titans have an all-time record of 482–529–6 as of the 2025 season.

== Player information ==
=== Current roster ===
Tennessee Titans roster
**Quarterbacks (QB)**: 10 Mitchell Trubisky; 1 Cam Ward; **Running backs (RB)**: 36 Julius Chestnut; 20 Tony Pollard; 32 Nicholas Singleton; 2 Tyjae Spears; **Wide receivers (WR)**: 5 Elic Ayomanor; 17 Chimere Dike RS; 87 Xavier Restrepo; 0 Calvin Ridley; 14 Carnell Tate; **Tight ends (TE)**: 82 Daniel Bellinger; 86 Kylen Granson; 84 Gunnar Helm; 88 David Martin-Robinson	**Offensive linemen (OL)**: 79 Pat Coogan C; 78 Brandon Crenshaw-Dickson T; 71 Garrett Dellinger G; 59 James Hudson T; 55 JC Latham T; 70 Atonio Mafi G; 75 Dan Moore T; 51 Austin Schlottmann C; 76 Chandler Zavala G; **Defensive linemen (DL)**: 15 Keldric Faulk DE; 91 John Franklin-Myers DT; 94 Timmy Horne DT; 11 Jermaine Johnson II DE; 56 Truman Jones DE; 99 Jonah Laulu DT; 57 Jacob Martin DE; 96 Jackie Marshall DT; 7 Oluwafemi Oladejo DE; 93 Nazir Stackhouse DT; 90 Solomon Thomas DT	**Linebackers (LB)**: 50 Cody Barton; 44 Mohamoud Diabate; 33 Cedric Gray; 53 Anthony Hill Jr.; 54 Dorian Mausi; **Defensive backs (DB)**: 29 Tony Adams S; 38 Terrell Burgess S; 18 Cor'Dale Flott CB; 26 Marcus Harris CB; 42 Jaylon Jones CB; 28 Isaiah Oliver S; 21 Micah Robinson CB; 24 Alontae Taylor CB; 25 Joshua Williams CB; 23 Kevin Winston Jr. S; **Special teams (ST)**: 46 Morgan Cox LS; 13 Thomas Morstead P; 6 Joey Slye K	**Practice squad**: -- Jason Brownlee WR; 35 Michael Carter RB; 48 Jimmy Ciarlo LB; 37 Bishop Fitzgerald S; 41 Erick Hallett S; 40 Dominique Hampton LB; 97 Jalyn Holmes DE; 16 Hendon Hooker QB; 62 Rasheed Miller T; 19 Tyren Montgomery WR; 67 Drew Moss C; 31 Kalel Mullings RB; 85 K. J. Osborn WR; 39 Jakob Robinson CB; 68 Laki Tasi DT (IPP); -- Jamari Thrash WR; 83 Joel Wilson TE; **Reserve**: 30 Kendell Brooks CB (IR); 66 Fernando Carmona G (IR); 45 Milo Eifler LB (IR); 92 Jaylen Harrell DE (IR); 81 Jaren Kanak TE (IR); 58 Tanoh Kpassagnon DE (IR); 4 Wan'Dale Robinson WR (IR); 77 Peter Skoronski G (IR); 64 Jackson Slater G (IR); 3 Tommy Townsend P (IR); 52 James Williams LB (IR) 53 active, 16 practice squad (1 IPP), 11 reserve As of November 17, 2026. Rookies in italics.; Roster; Depth chart; Transactions

=== Retired numbers ===
Houston / Tennessee Oilers / Titans retired numbers
No.	Player	Position	Years played	Retired
**1** †	Warren Moon	QB	1984–1993	October 1, 2006
**9**	Steve McNair	QB	1995–2005	September 15, 2019
**27**	Eddie George	RB	1996–2003	September 15, 2019
**34**	Earl Campbell	RB	1978–1984	August 13, 1987
**43**	Jim Norton	S/P	1960–1968	1968
**63**	Mike Munchak	G	1982–1993	November 6, 1994
**65**	Elvin Bethea	DE	1968–1983	August 4, 1983
**74**	Bruce Matthews	G	1983–2001	December 8, 2002

†: Moon granted his permission for first overall pick quarterback Cam Ward to wear it in 2025.

=== Pro Football Hall of Fame members ===
Houston Oilers / Tennessee Oilers / Titans Hall of Famers
Players
No.	Inductee	Class	Position	Seasons
16	**George Blanda**	1981	QB / K	1960–1966
29	Ken Houston	1986	S	1967–1972
35	John Henry Johnson	1987	FB	1966
34	**Earl Campbell**	1991	RB	1978–1984
18	Charlie Joiner	1996	WR	1969–1972
63	**Mike Munchak**	2001	G	1982–1993
87	Dave Casper	2002	TE	1980–1983
65	**Elvin Bethea**	2003	DE	1968–1983
1	**Warren Moon**	2006	QB	1984–1993
74	**Bruce Matthews**	2007	G	1983–2001
78	**Curley Culp**	2013	DT	1974–1980
12	Ken Stabler	2016	QB	1980–1981
52	**Robert Brazile**	2018	LB	1975–1984
84	Randy Moss	2018	WR	2010
68	Kevin Mawae	2019	C	2006–2009
73	Steve Hutchinson	2020	G	2012
81	Andre Johnson	2024	WR	2016
Coaches and executives
Inductee		Class	Position	Seasons
Sammy Baugh		1963	Head coach	1964
Sid Gillman		1983	Head coach	1973–1974

=== Texas Sports Hall of Fame ===
Elected to the Pro Football Hall of Fame

Houston / Tennessee Oilers / Titans Ring of Honor
No.	Name	Position	Years	Inducted
65	Elvin Bethea	DE	1968–1983	December 9, 1999
16	George Blanda	QB	1960–1966	December 9, 1999
34	Earl Campbell	RB	1978–1984	December 9, 1999
—	Mike Holovak	GM	1989–1993	December 9, 1999
29	Ken Houston	S	1967–1972	December 9, 1999
63	Mike Munchak	G	1982–1993	December 9, 1999
43	Jim Norton	P	1960–1968	December 9, 1999
74	Bruce Matthews	G	1983–2001	December 8, 2002
1	Warren Moon	QB	1984–1993	October 1, 2007
—	Bud Adams	Owner/founder	1959–2013	September 7, 2008
27	Eddie George	RB	1996–2003	October 27, 2008
9	Steve McNair	QB	1995–2005	October 27, 2008
89	Frank Wycheck	TE	1995–2003	October 27, 2008
52	Robert Brazile	LB	1975–1984	October 14, 2018
—	Bum Phillips	Coach	1975–1980	September 26, 2021
—	Jeff Fisher	Coach	1994–2010	November 21, 2021
—	Floyd Reese	Coach/GM	1986–2006	November 21, 2021
84	Billy "White Shoes" Johnson	WR	1974–1980	December 17, 2023

=== Franchise leaders ===
Bold denotes still active with team

Italics denote still active but not with team

Passing yards (regular season) (as of end of 2024 season)

1. Warren Moon (33,685)
2. Steve McNair (27,141)
3. George Blanda (19,149)
4. Dan Pastorini (16,864)
5. Ryan Tannehill (14,111)
6. Marcus Mariota (13,207)
7. Vince Young (8,098)
8. Kerry Collins (6,804)
9. Ken Stabler (5,190)
10. Pete Beathard (5,128)

Rushing yards (regular season) (as of end of 2024 season)

1. Eddie George (10,009)
2. Derrick Henry (9,502)
3. Earl Campbell (8,574)
4. Chris Johnson (7,965)
5. Lorenzo White (4,079)
6. Hoyle Granger (3,514)
7. Steve McNair (3,439)
8. Mike Rozier (3,426)
9. Charley Tolar (3,277)
10. Ronnie Coleman (2,769)

Receiving yards (regular season) (as of end of 2024 season)

1. Ernest Givens (7,935)
2. Drew Hill (7,477)
3. Ken Burrough (6,906)
4. Charley Hennigan (6,823)
5. Haywood Jeffires (6,119)
6. Derrick Mason (6,114)
7. Delanie Walker (5,888)
8. Frank Wycheck (4,958)
9. Nate Washington (4,591)
10. Drew Bennett (4,033)

== Coaching staff ==
=== Head coaches ===
The Fans

=== Current staff ===
Tennessee Titans staff
Front office: Owner – KSA Industries; Controlling owner – Amy Adams Strunk; President/CEO – Burke Nihill; General manager – Mike Borgonzi; Assistant general manager – Dave Ziegler; Executive vice president of football operations – Dave Gardi; Senior vice president of football administration/player finance – Vin Marino; Football Counsel/Head of football research – Bryce Wasserman; Director of football administration – Leland Taylor; Vice president of player personnel – Dan Saganey; Director of player personnel – Jon Salge; Director of college scouting – Mike Boni; Director of pro scouting – Shane Normandeau; Assistant director of college scouting – Dale Thompson; Vice president/football advisor – Reggie McKenzie; Director, Strategy and analytics – Benjamin Contrino; Coordinator, football research and development – Erin Psajdl Davis; Head coaches: Head coach – Robert Saleh; Assistant head coach/special teams coordinator – John Fassel; Offensive coaches: Offensive coordinator – Brian Daboll; Quarterbacks – Shea Tierney; Running backs/Bill Walsh diversity coaching fellowship coordinator – Randy Jordan; Wide receivers – Greg Lewis; Tight ends – Luke Stocker; Offensive line – Carmen Bricillo; Assistant offensive line – Isaac Williams; Offensive assistant/game management – Cade Knox; Offensive assistant – Trevor Browder; Offensive assistant – John Rudnicki	Defensive coaches: Defensive coordinator – Gus Bradley; Defensive line – Aaron Whitecotton; Assistant defensive line – Tanzel Smart; Linebackers – Dave Borgonzi; Passing game coordinator/cornerbacks – Tony Oden; Defensive backs/safeties – Marquand Manuel; Defensive backs/nickels – Dalton Hilliard; Senior defensive assistant – Ben Bloom; Defensive assistant – Ahmed Saleh; Special teams coaches: Assistant special teams – Rayna Stewart; Assistant to the head coach – Tom Jones; Strength and conditioning: Director of sports performance – Zac Woodfin; Assistant director of sports performance – Brian Bell; Senior assistant of sports performance – Dave Poluka; Assistant of sports performance – Brent Callaway; Assistant of sports performance & speed training – John Shaw; → Coaching staff → Front office → More NFL staffs

== Radio and television ==
The flagship radio station of the Titans Radio Network for several years was WKDF 103.3-FM. WGFX 104.5-FM, the original Tennessee Oilers/Titans Radio flagship station, has served as the Titans Radio flagship station since the 2010 season. Taylor Zarzour is the team's play-by-play announcer, and former Titans assistant coach Dave McGinnis, head coach of the Arizona Cardinals from 2000 to 2003, provides color commentary during games. Previous to McGinnis, former Titans tight end Frank Wycheck provided the color commentary. Larry Stone provides injury and scoring updates. The Titans Radio Network is broadcast on 70 stations.

In 2011, the Titans extended its agreement with existing radio partners while creating a provision allowing home games to be broadcast on SiriusXM. They were the final team in the NFL to reach such a deal.

Most preseason games are televised on Nexstar station WKRN-TV, the ABC affiliate in Nashville, with The Mike Vrabel Show, a weekly Tuesday night coach's show. The preseason games are distributed through a network consisting of Nexstar stations throughout the state and some affiliates where Nexstar has no stations.

For regular season games, Nashville CBS affiliate WTVF airs the most games due to its AFC-centric rights. Fox affiliate WZTV carries home games against NFC opponents, with select flexed games, NBC affiliate WSMV-TV has Sunday Night Football broadcasts, and WKRN carries the team's Monday Night Football games.

== See also ==
- List of American Football League players
- NFL Cheerleading

Preceded by League formed	AFL champions Houston Oilers; 1960, 1961	Succeeded by Dallas Texans
