= The Amazing Race 35 =

Season of television series

- Season 35
- Promotional poster
- Presented by: Phil Keoghan
- No. of teams: 13
- Winners: Greg and John Franklin
- No. of legs: 12
- Distance traveled: 23,800 mi (38,300 km)
- No. of episodes: 12

Release
- Original network: CBS
- Original release: September 27 – December 13, 2023

Additional information
- Filming dates: June 13 – July 8, 2023

Series chronology
- ← Previous; Season 34 Next → Season 36

The Amazing Race 35 is the thirty-fifth season of the American reality competition show The Amazing Race. Hosted by Phil Keoghan, it featured thirteen teams of two, each with a pre-existing relationship, competing in a race around the world to win US$1,000,000. This season visited three continents and nine countries and traveled over 23,800 miles (38,300 km) during twelve legs. Starting in Los Angeles, racers traveled through Thailand, Vietnam, India, Germany, Austria, Slovenia, Sweden, and Ireland, before returning to the United States and finishing in Greater Seattle. Elements of the show that returned for this season include the use of commercial flights, the Express Pass, and the U-Turn. In addition, the U-Turn Vote returned with a private vote rather than a public vote, and the U-Turn was a Blind U-Turn. Unlike past seasons, the 35th season featured 90-minute-long episodes. The season premiered on CBS on September 27, 2023, and concluded on December 13, 2023.

For the first time in the history of the American version of The Amazing Race, the final three teams consisted entirely of male teams. Brothers and computer scientists Greg and John Franklin were the winners of this season, while best friends Joel Strasser and Garrett Smith finished in second place, and father and son Rob and Corey McArthur finished in third place.

== Format ==
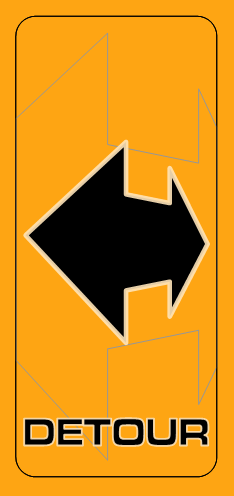
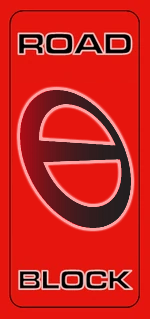
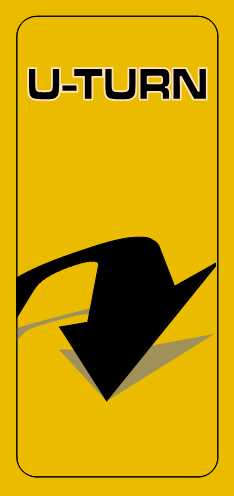
The clues which contestants receive during the course of the race generally fall into four categories: Route Info, Detour, Roadblock, and U-Turn.

The Amazing Race is a reality television show created by Bertram van Munster and Elise Doganieri, and hosted by Phil Keoghan. The series follows teams of two competing in a race around the world. Each leg of the race requires teams to deduce clues, navigate foreign environments, interact with locals, perform physical and mental challenges, and travel on a limited budget provided by the show. At each stop during the leg, teams receive clues inside sealed envelopes, which fall into one of these categories:

- Route Info: These are simple instructions that teams must follow before they can receive their next clue.
- Detour: A Detour is a choice between two tasks. Teams may choose either task and switch tasks if they find one option too difficult. There is usually one Detour present on each leg.
- Roadblock: A Roadblock is a task that only one team member can complete. Teams must choose which member will complete the task based on a brief clue they receive before fully learning the details of the task. There is usually one Roadblock present on each leg.
- U-Turn: The U-Turn allows teams to force another team to complete both options of the Detour before they can continue the race.
- Scramble: A Scramble allows teams to complete a set of three tasks in any order that they choose. At the end of each task, teams receive one of three clue puzzle pieces that reveal their next destination after they are combined.

Most teams who arrive last at the Pit Stop of each leg are progressively eliminated, while the first team to arrive at the finish line in the final episode wins the grand prize of US$1,000,000.

== Contestants ==
This season features thirteen teams of two with the cast revealed on August 30, 2023.

Contestants	Age	Relationship	Hometown	Status
Alexandra Lichtor	34	Siblings & Roommates	Chicago, Illinois	Eliminated 1st (in Mueang Nonthaburi, Thailand)
Sheridan Lichtor	29	Siblings & Roommates	Chicago, Illinois	Eliminated 1st (in Mueang Nonthaburi, Thailand)
Elizabeth Rivera	52	Mother & Daughter	Tampa, Florida	Eliminated 2nd (in Sam Phran, Thailand)
Iliana Rivera	27	Mother & Daughter	Tampa, Florida	Eliminated 2nd (in Sam Phran, Thailand)
Jocelyn Chao	49	Married Entrepreneurs	Albuquerque, New Mexico	Eliminated 3rd (in Cần Thơ, Vietnam)
Victor Limary	49	Married Entrepreneurs	Albuquerque, New Mexico	Eliminated 3rd (in Cần Thơ, Vietnam)
Joe Moskowitz	35	Engaged	New York City, New York	Eliminated 4th (in Jaipur, India)
Ian Todd	40	Engaged	New York City, New York	Eliminated 4th (in Jaipur, India)
Liam Hykel	23	Brothers	Cheyenne, Wyoming	Eliminated 5th (in Jaipur, India)
Yeremi Hykel	24	Brothers	San Marcos, Texas	Eliminated 5th (in Jaipur, India)
Andrea Simpson	44	College Friends	Philadelphia, Pennsylvania	Eliminated 6th (in Cologne, Germany)
Malaina Hatcher	45	College Friends	Philadelphia, Pennsylvania	Eliminated 6th (in Cologne, Germany)
Morgan Franklin	31	Sisters	Brooklyn, New York	Eliminated 7th (in Ljubljana, Slovenia)
Lena Franklin	29	Sisters	Los Angeles, California	Eliminated 7th (in Ljubljana, Slovenia)
Robbin Tomich	41	Childhood Friends	Kirkland, Washington	Eliminated 8th (in Socerb, Slovenia)
Chelsea Day	41	Childhood Friends	Shoreline, Washington	Eliminated 8th (in Socerb, Slovenia)
Todd Martin	38	Married High School Sweethearts	Chino, California	Eliminated 9th (in Stockholm, Sweden)
Ashlie Martin	38	Married High School Sweethearts	Chino, California	Eliminated 9th (in Stockholm, Sweden)
Steve Cargile	54	Father & Daughter	Petty, Texas	Eliminated 10th (in Dublin, Ireland)
Anna Leigh Wilson	28	Father & Daughter	Royse City, Texas	Eliminated 10th (in Dublin, Ireland)
Rob McArthur	48	Father & Son	Riverside, California	Third place
Corey McArthur	25	Father & Son	New York City, New York	Third place
Joel Strasser	42	Best Friends	Kuna, Idaho	Runners-up
Garrett Smith	43	Best Friends	Meridian, Idaho	Runners-up
Greg Franklin	25	Brothers & Computer Scientists	New York City, New York	Winners
John Franklin	27	Brothers & Computer Scientists	Mountain View, California	Winners

Future appearances

Anna Leigh Wilson competed on the third season of The Floor in 2025. Yeremi Hykel competed on The Challenge: Vets & New Threats in 2025. Wilson competed on The Challenge: Cutthroat in 2026.

== Contestant progress ==
The following teams are listed with their placements in each leg. Placements are listed in finishing order.

- A red placement with a dagger (†) indicates that the team was eliminated.
- A purple ε indicates that the team used an Express Pass on that leg to bypass one of their tasks.
- An italicized and underlined placement indicates that the team was the last to arrive at a Pit Stop, but there was no rest period at the Pit Stop and all teams were instructed to continue racing.
- A brown ⊂ indicates the team on the receiving end of a U-Turn.

Team placement (by leg)
Team	1	2	3	4	5	6	7	8	9	10	11	12
Greg & John	3rd	3rd	8th	8th	2nd	1st	1st	1st	1st	2nd	2nd	1st
Joel & Garrett	7th	9th	2nd	9th	3rd	3rd	7th	4th	2nd	1st	3rd	2nd
Rob & Corey	2nd	2nd	3rd	5th	6th	2nd	4th	3rd	4th	3rdε (Note: Rob & Corey used their Express Pass to bypass the Roadblock on this leg.)	1st	3rd
Steve & Anna Leigh	6th	6th	1st	2nd	1st	7th⊂ (Note: In the sixth leg, the teams anonymously voted for one team to be U-Turned; Steve & Anna Leigh received the most votes.)	5th	6th	3rd	4th	4th†	
Todd & Ashlie	5th	5th	4th	3rd	5th	5th	3rd	2nd	5th	5th†		
Robbin & Chelsea	11th	11th	5th	1st	7th	8th	2nd	5th	6th†			
Morgan & Lena	4th	4th	6thε (Note: Morgan & Lena used their Express Pass to bypass the floating market task on this leg.)	10th	9th	4th	6th	7th†				
Andrea & Malaina	10th	10th	9th	7th	4th	6th	8th†					
Liam & Yeremi	8th	8th	11th (Note: This team arrived last at the Pit Stop, but they were instructed to continue racing.)	6th	8th	9th†						
Joe & Ian	9th	7th	7th	4th	10th†							
Jocelyn & Victor	1st	1st	10th	11th†								
Elizabeth & Iliana	12th	12th†										
Alexandra & Sheridan	13th†											

== Race summary ==
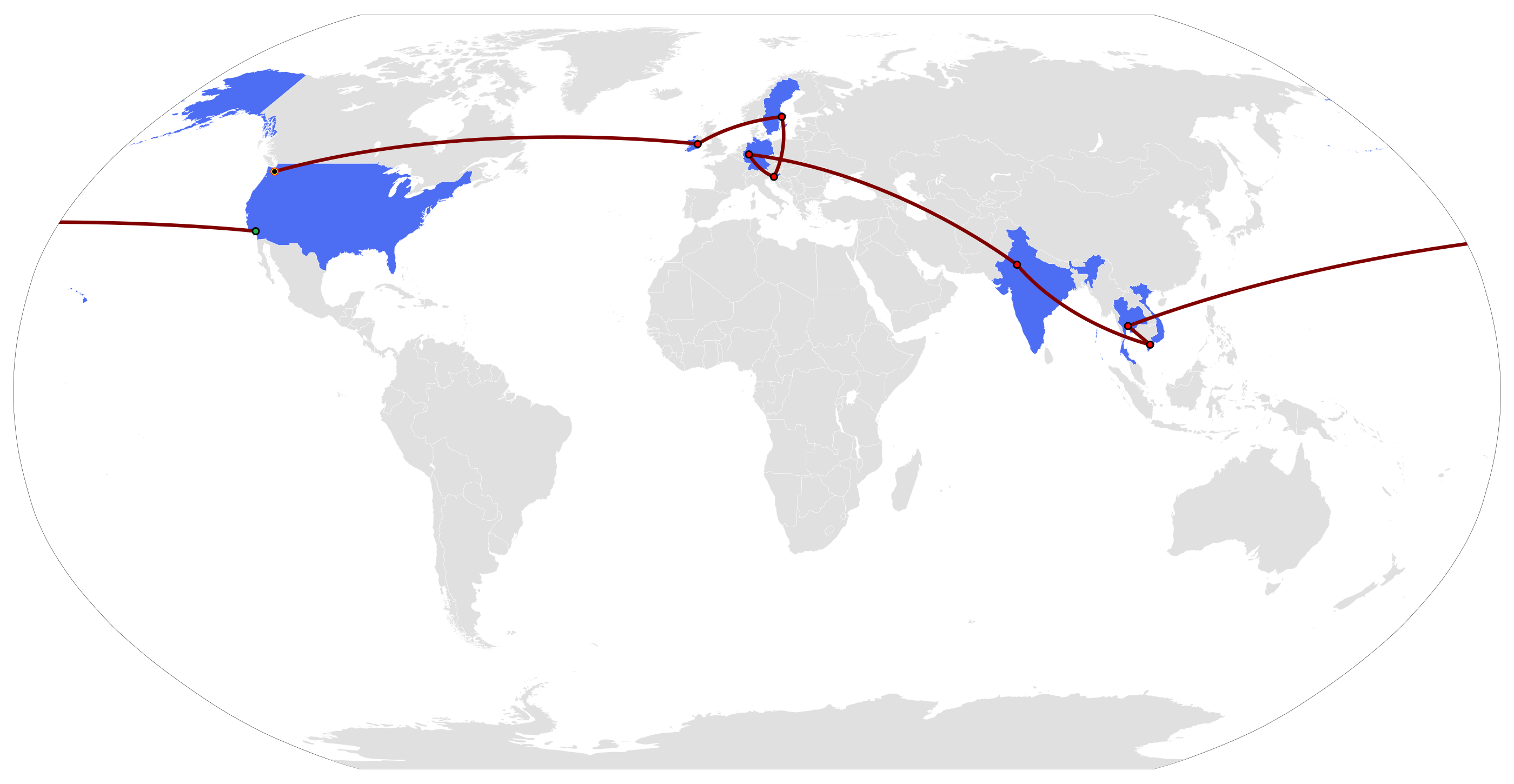
The route of The Amazing Race 35.

Destinations	Air travel Rail travel Water travel Bus travel Helicopter travel Bicycle travel Gondola travel
Route Markers	Detour Roadblock U-Turn Express Pass Scramble Pit Stop

=== Leg 1 (United States → Thailand) ===
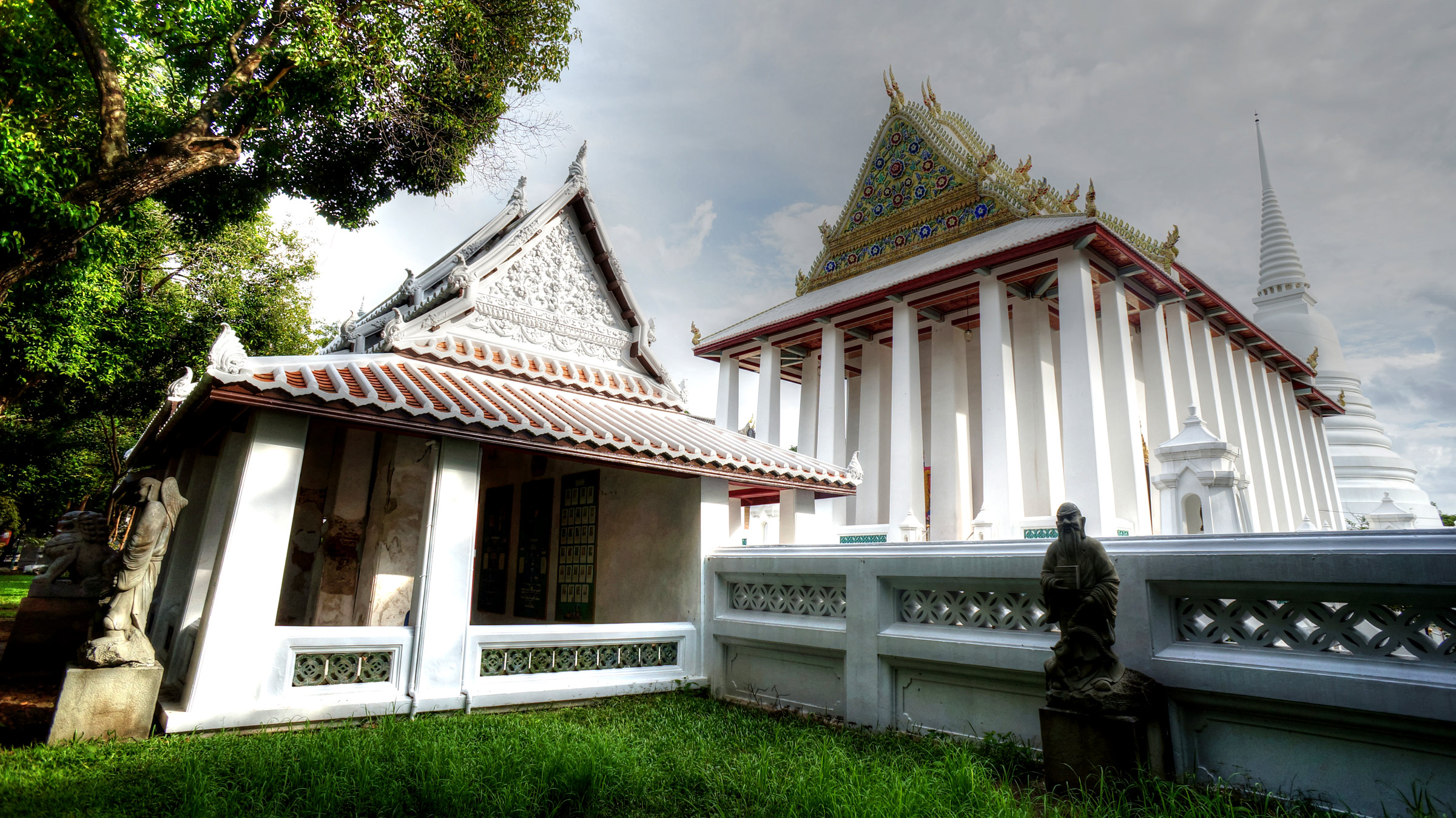
The first leg of The Amazing Race 35 came to an end at Wat Chaloem Phra Kiat Worawihan outside of Bangkok.

- Episode 1: "The Amazing Race Is Back!" (September 27, 2023)
- Prize: Cashback rewards for a trip for two to Patagonia, Chile (awarded to Jocelyn and Victor)
- Eliminated: Alexandra and Sheridan

Locations

- Los Angeles, California (Griffith Park – Hollywood Sign) (Starting Line)
- Los Angeles (Millennium Biltmore Hotel)
- Los Angeles → Bangkok, Thailand
- Bangkok (Wat Paknam)
- Bangkok (Wat Suthat)
- Bangkok (Saranrom Park or Putthinan Thai Massage)
- Mueang Nonthaburi (Wat Chaloem Phra Kiat Worawihan)

Episode summary

- Teams began the race beneath the Hollywood Sign, drove to the Millennium Biltmore Hotel, and found their next clue.
- In this season's first Roadblock, one team member had to walk across a tightrope strung between the Millennium Biltmore Hotel and unscramble a word puzzle – CITY OF ANGELS – to receive their next clue from season 34 winners Derek Xiao and Claire Rehfuss.
- After the Roadblock, teams had to drive to the airport and obtain tickets for one of two flights to Bangkok, Thailand. Six teams were booked on the first flight, which departed 90 minutes earlier than the second flight with the remaining seven teams. Once there, teams had to travel to Wat Paknam, which had their next clue.
- One team had the option of winning an Express Pass if both team members could eat a plate of fried insects. Morgan and Lena won the Express Pass.
- From Wat Paknam, teams had to travel by long-tail boat and tuk-tuk to Wat Suthat, which had their next clue.
- This season's first Detour was a choice between Sword Play or Spa Day. In Sword Play, both team members had to learn a 30-second daab sword routine to receive their next clue. In Spa Day, both team members had to endure a painful 30-minute Thai massage to receive their next clue. If either team member asked to stop the massage, the team had to go to the end of the line and restart the massage from the beginning.
- After the Detour, teams had to check in at the Pit Stop: Wat Chaloem Phra Kiat Worawihan.

=== Leg 2 (Thailand) ===
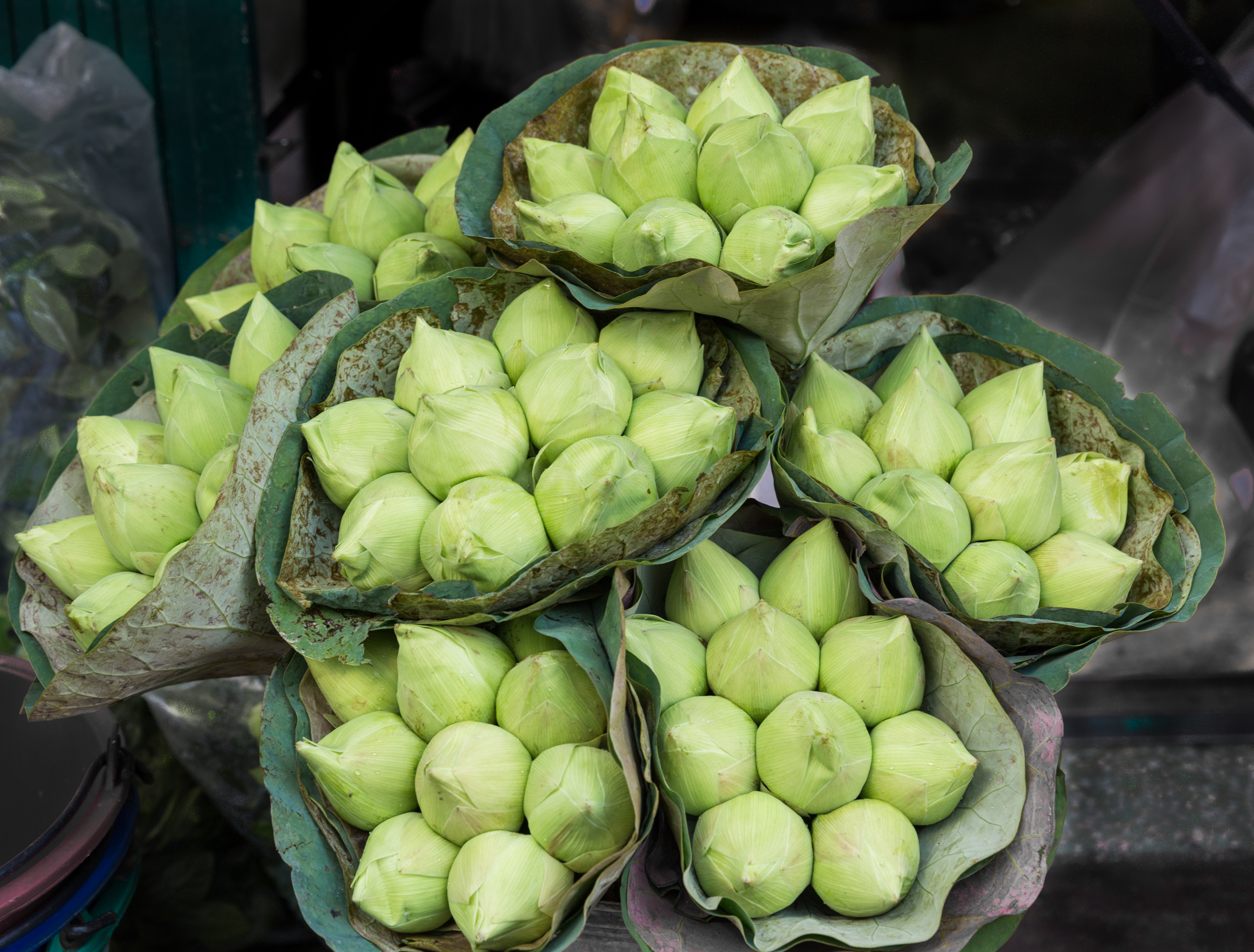
The Roadblock in Nakhon Pathom province had racers harvest lotus flower bulbs to make two bundles.

- Episode 2: "You Don't See That At Home" (October 4, 2023)
- Prize: US$2,000 each (awarded to Jocelyn and Victor)
- Eliminated: Elizabeth and Iliana

Locations

- Mueang Nonthaburi (Wat Chaloem Phra Kiat Worawihan)
- Salaya (Wat Suwannaram)
- Rai Khing (Wat Rai Khing)
- Sam Phran (Don Wai Market or Ton Som O Farm 3)
- Sam Phran (Suan Sampran)

Episode summary

- At the start of this leg, teams were instructed to travel to Wat Suwannaram to find their next clue.
- In this leg's Roadblock, one team member had to harvest 20 lotus flower bulbs from a muddy pond. Racers then had to make two bundles arranged in a specific pattern and wrapped with leaves and bamboo ties to receive their next clue.
- After the Roadblock, teams had to travel to Wat Rai Khing, place a coin in a marked elephant, and walk under the elephant three times to receive their next clue.
- This leg's Detour was a choice between Stock Up or Scoop Up. In Stock Up, teams had to purchase eight food items of specified quantities at Don Wai Market using only a phonetically-spelled shopping list to receive their next clue. In Scoop Up, teams had to load a boat with pomelos from canals and then unload them at a dock until they filled five baskets to receive their next clue.
- After the Detour, teams had to check in at the Pit Stop: Suan Sampran.

=== Leg 3 (Thailand → Vietnam) ===
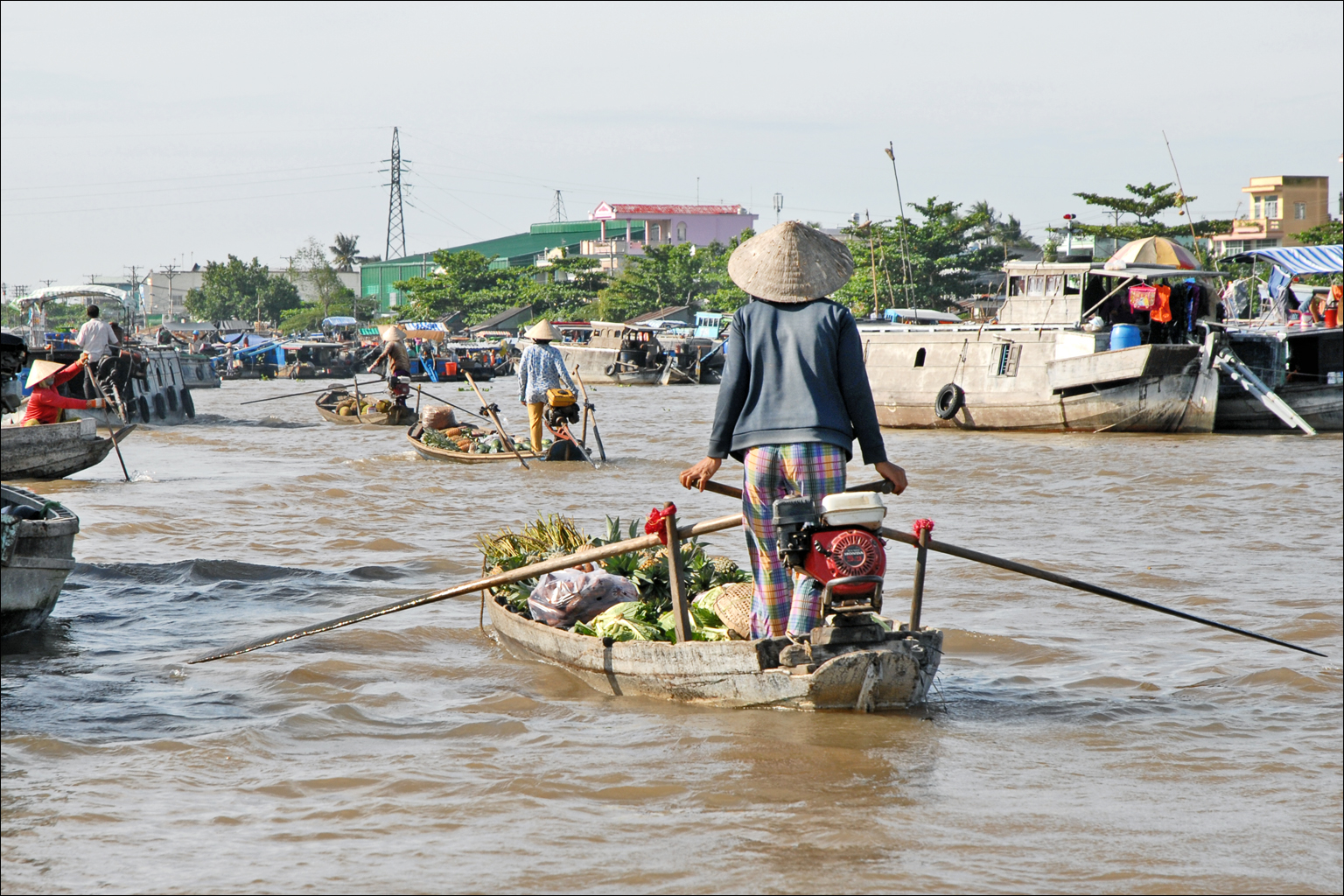
In Cần Thơ, teams delivered fruit in the city's floating market on the Mekong Delta.

- Episode 3: "No Sleep and a Million Dollar Dream" (October 11, 2023)

Locations

- Bangkok (Santichaiprakarn Park)
- Bangkok (Thailand Tour & Travel)
- Bangkok → Ho Chi Minh City, Vietnam
- Ho Chi Minh City → Cần Thơ (Ninh Kiều Wharf)
- Cần Thơ (Cái Răng Floating Market)
- Cần Thơ (Pier 20)
- Cần Thơ (Sáu Hoài or Thanh Vân)
- Cần Thơ (Trúc Lâm Phương Nam Zen Monastery)

Episode summary

- At the start of this leg, teams were instructed to fly to Ho Chi Minh City, Vietnam, with teams required to book their flight at Thailand Tour & Travel. Once there, teams had to travel by bus to the Ninh Kiều wharf in Cần Thơ and choose one of three departure times for the morning, when they received their next clue. Teams then boarded a sampan and had to deliver baskets of fruit – dragonfruit, tangerines, and golden melons – to three marked boats. With each delivery, teams received a third of a photograph that, when combined, revealed the location of their next clue: Pier 20. Morgan and Lena used their Express Pass to bypass this task.
- This leg's Detour was a choice between Paper or Plastic. In Paper, teams had to make twelve sheets of edible rice paper to receive their next clue. In Plastic, teams had to apply vinyl onto a motorcycle part to receive their next clue.
- After the Detour, teams had to check in at the Pit Stop: Trúc Lâm Phương Nam Zen Monastery.

Additional note

- There was no elimination at the end of this leg; all teams were instead instructed to continue racing.

=== Leg 4 (Vietnam) ===
The Roadblock and Pit Stop for the second Vietnamese leg were at the Hùng King Temple.

- Episode 4: "The Day Keeps Rockin' Here In Vietnam" (October 18, 2023)
- Prize: Cashback rewards for a trip for two to Madrid, Spain (awarded to Robbin and Chelsea)
- Eliminated: Jocelyn and Victor

Locations

- Cần Thơ (Cafe Tư Điếc)
- Cần Thơ (Chợ Tân An or Nhà Hàng Riverside & West Hotel)
- Cần Thơ (Ong Pagoda)
- Cần Thơ (Hùng King Temple)

Episode summary

- At the start of this leg, teams had to travel by taxi to Cafe Tư Điếc and ask a barista for their next clue.
- This leg's Detour was a choice between Stand or Deliver. In Stand, teams had to carry seafood through a market to a stall and set up the stall so that it matched a vendor's to receive their next clue. In Deliver, teams had to carry four 66-pound (30 kg) mattresses to a hotel to receive their next clue.
- After the Detour, teams had to travel to the Ong Pagoda and write a wish on a card before receiving their next clue, which directed them to travel by taxi to the Hùng King Temple.
- In this leg's Roadblock, one team member had search among thousands of tiles that adorn the temple grounds and find the one tile that matched the photograph in their clue before they could check in at the nearby Pit Stop.

=== Leg 5 (Vietnam → India) ===
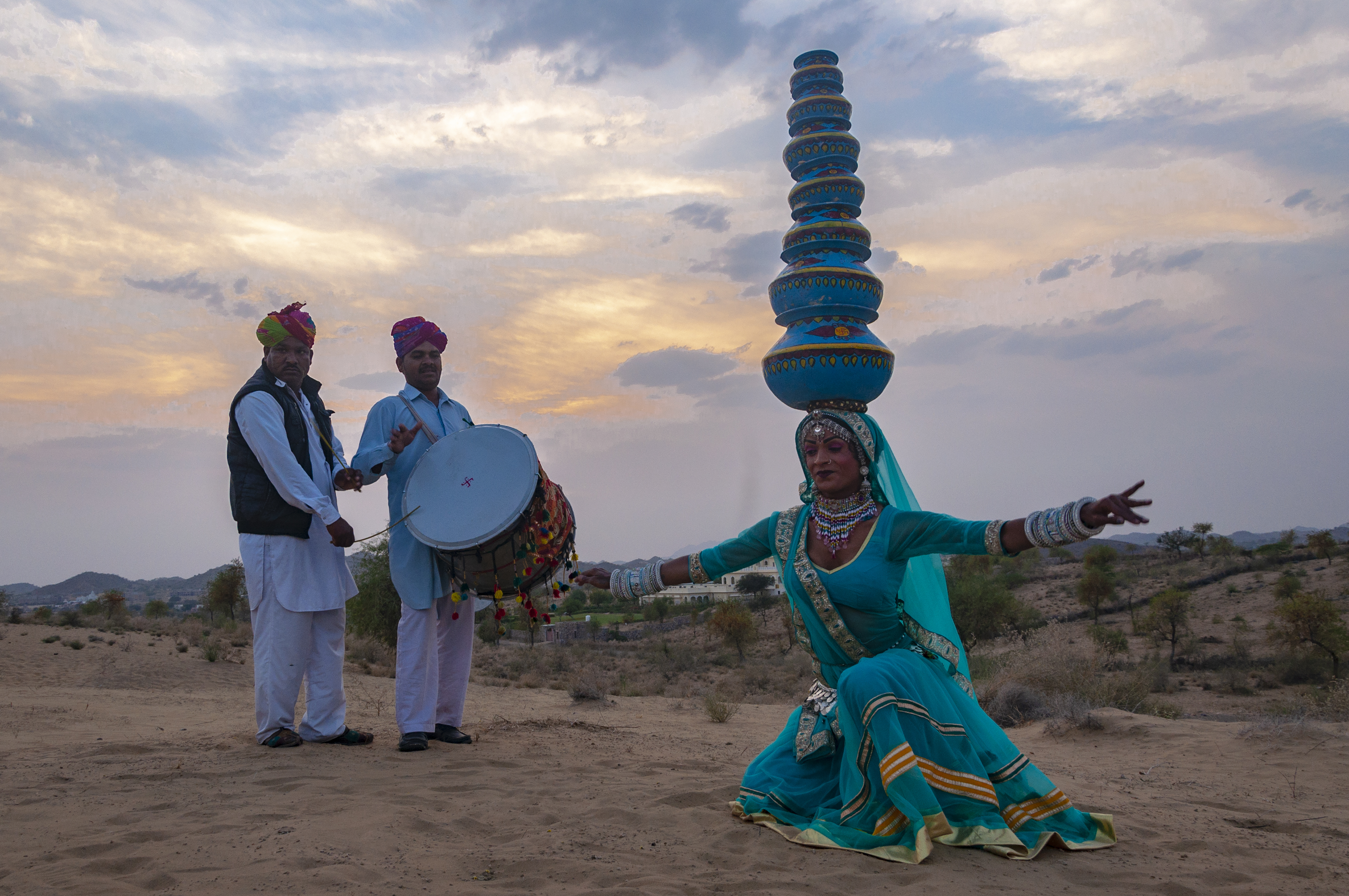
The Roadblock in Amber, India, had racers perform a Bhavai dance.

- Episode 5: "Yessir, the Pink City" (October 25, 2023)
- Prize: US$3,000 each (awarded to Steve and Anna Leigh)
- Eliminated: Joe and Ian

Locations

- Cần Thơ (Sheraton Can Tho)
- Ho Chi Minh City → Jaipur, India
- Amber (Amber Palace)
- Amber (Panna Meena ka Kund)
- Amber (Jaigarh Fort)
- Jaipur (Gatore Ki Chhatriyan)

Episode summary

- At the start of this leg, teams were instructed to fly to Jaipur, India. Once there, teams had to travel by taxi to the Amber Palace, and carry a bundle of sugarcane up a path to a mahout to receive their next clue.
- In this leg's Roadblock, one team member had to perform a Bhavai dance, which involved balancing a stack of three pots on their head without dropping them, to receive their next clue.
- After the Roadblock, teams had to travel on foot to Panna Meena ka Kund and find their next clue. Teams then had to travel to their next destinations by auto rickshaw.
- This leg's Detour was a choice between All Dolled Up or The Big Picture. In All Dolled Up, teams had to assemble two Kathputli marionettes to receive their next clue. In The Big Picture, teams had to recreate a Rajput painting by adding themselves in costumes and the correct cutouts to an incomplete mural to receive their next clue.
- After the Detour, teams had to check in at the Pit Stop: Gatore Ki Chhatriyan.

=== Leg 6 (India) ===
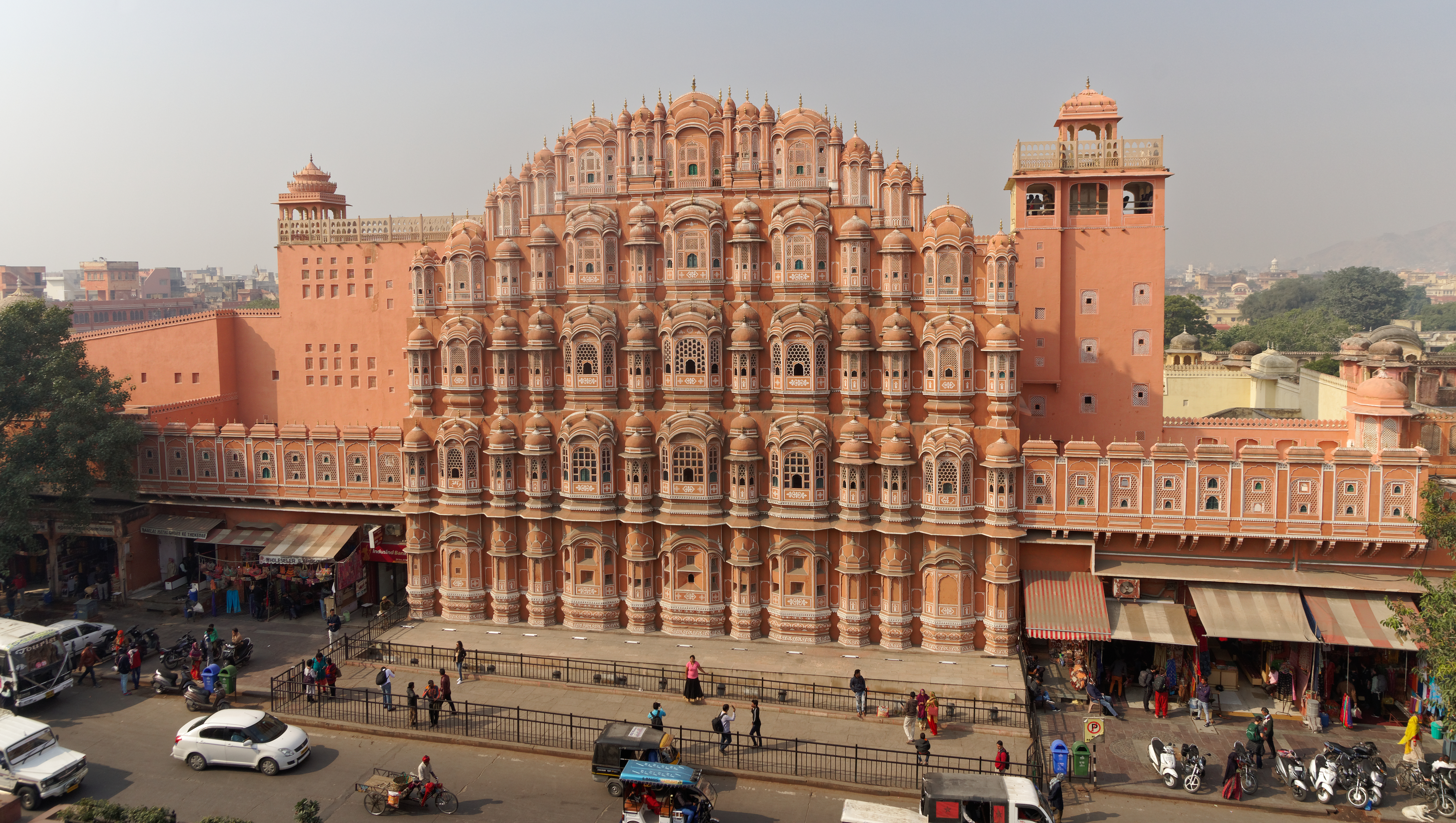
Teams began their second leg in Jaipur by searching the windows of Hawa Mahal.

- Episode 6: "Driving Head on Into Scooters" (November 1, 2023)
- Prize: Cashback rewards for a trip for two to Wairarapa, New Zealand (awarded to Greg and John)
- Eliminated: Liam and Yeremi

Locations

- Jaipur (Gatore Ki Chhatriyan)
- Jaipur (Famous Nagra Shoe Store №32)
- Jaipur (Hawa Mahal)
- Jaipur (City Palace – Udai Poll №2)
- Jaipur (SD Masala Spice Shop №49)
- Jaipur (Sani Phula Bhandar №79, Tarkeshwar Mahadev Temple & Shiv Mandir or Vivek Enterprises & 826 Balai Colony)
- Jaipur (Garg Textile Wholesale Fabric Shop)
- Jaipur (Jaipur Mahal)
- Jaipur (Badi Chaupar)

Episode summary

- At the start of this leg, teams had to travel by taxi to Famous Nagra Shoe Store №32 and ask the shop owner for their next clue. Teams then had to use a telescoping monocular to search the 953 windows of Hawa Mahal for the location of their next clue: Udai Poll №2 near Jalebi Chowk. There, teams had to get an electric auto rickshaw out of a lot by pushing surrounding rickshaws out of the way and then travel on it to SD Masala Spice Shop №49 to find their next clue and learn if they were U-Turned.
- This leg's Detour was a choice between Bundles or Bricks. In Bundles, teams had to bundle four types of Navrang flowers, load their auto rickshaw with the flowers, deliver the flowers to two temples, and return to the flower market to exchange their receipts for their next clue. In Bricks, teams had to load a cycling rickshaw with 50 bricks, one sack of sand, and two sacks of gravel, deliver the supplies to a construction site, and give their receipt to a supplier to receive their next clue.
- After the Detour, teams had to travel to Garg Textile Wholesale Fabric Shop to receive a bolt of fabric and their next clue directing them to Jaipur Mahal.
- In this leg's Roadblock, one team member had to use four printing blocks to properly print nine Indian peacocks on their fabric bolt to receive their next clue directing them to the Pit Stop: Badi Chaupar.

Additional note

- Before teams began this leg, they had to vote in secret for a team to be U-Turned. Steve and Anna Leigh received the most votes. The teams' votes were as follows:

U-Turn Vote results
Team	Vote
Andrea & Malaina	Steve & Anna Leigh
Greg & John	Steve & Anna Leigh
Joel & Garrett	Steve & Anna Leigh
Liam & Yeremi	Robbin & Chelsea
Morgan & Lena	Robbin & Chelsea
Rob & Corey	Steve & Anna Leigh
Robbin & Chelsea	Steve & Anna Leigh
Steve & Anna Leigh	Robbin & Chelsea
Todd & Ashlie	Robbin & Chelsea

=== Leg 7 (India → Germany) ===
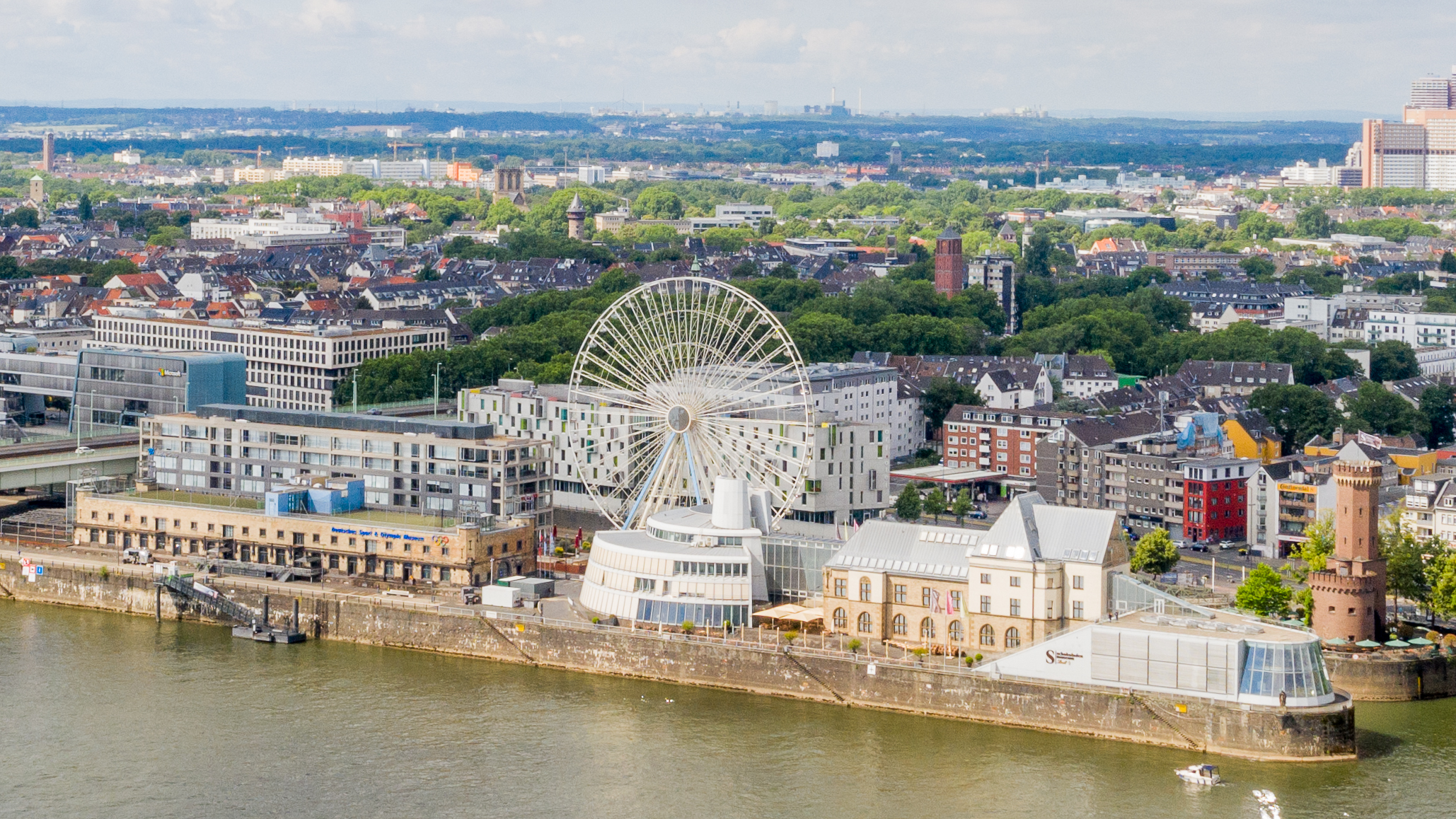
At the end of a leg in the Rhineland, teams encountered the Detour and Pit Stop on the banks of the Rhine.

- Episode 7: "Like Two Cats Fighting in a Car" (November 8, 2023)
- Prize: US$4,000 each (awarded to Greg and John)
- Eliminated: Andrea and Malaina

Locations

- Jaipur (Badi Chaupar)
- Jaipur (Rajasthan Travel Service)
- Jaipur → Frankfurt, Germany
- Kaub (Fähre-Kaub)
- Trechtingshausen (Burg Rheinstein)
- Cologne (Gürzenich Köln)
- Cologne (Hohenzollernbrücke)
- Cologne (Deutsches Sport & Olympia Museum or Hafenterrasse)
- Cologne (Schokoladenmuseum)

Episode summary

- At the start of this leg, teams were instructed to fly to Frankfurt, Germany, with teams required to book their flight at Rajasthan Travel Service. Once there, teams had to drive to Fähre-Kaub and exchange five euros for a bag of witten while crossing the Rhine on the ferry. Teams then drove to Burg Rheinstein for their next clue.
- In this leg's first Roadblock, one team member had to use a formula to give the equivalent of five groschen using witten to a robber baron. Once done, racers gained entry to the castle, received their next clue, and rappelled back down to their partner.
- After the first Roadblock, teams had to drive to Cologne and find their next clue at Gürzenich Köln. There, teams had to take part in a Cologne Carnival with one team member pedaling a hussar bicycle and the other throwing roses to the crowd before receiving their next clue. Then, teams had to travel on foot to the Hohenzollernbrücke, which had their next clue.
- In this leg's second Roadblock, the team member who did not perform the previous Roadblock had to search among thousands of love locks on the bridge for a combination lock marked with an Amazing Race flag and unlock it using the numbers of the oldest cologne produced in Cologne to receive their next clue.
- This leg's Detour was a choice between Just for Kicks or Matter of Taste. In Just for Kicks, teams had to kick four soccer balls onto a large dartboard and score exactly 66 points to receive their next clue. In Matter of Taste, teams had to sample nine mustards, memorize their German names, and then identify nine unmarked samples to receive their next clue.
- After the Detour, teams had to check in at the Pit Stop: the Schokoladenmuseum.

Additional note

- Andrea and Malaina fell so far behind that Keoghan met them when they arrived at Gürzenich Köln to inform them of their elimination, as all of the other teams had already checked in at the Pit Stop.

=== Leg 8 (Germany → Austria → Slovenia) ===
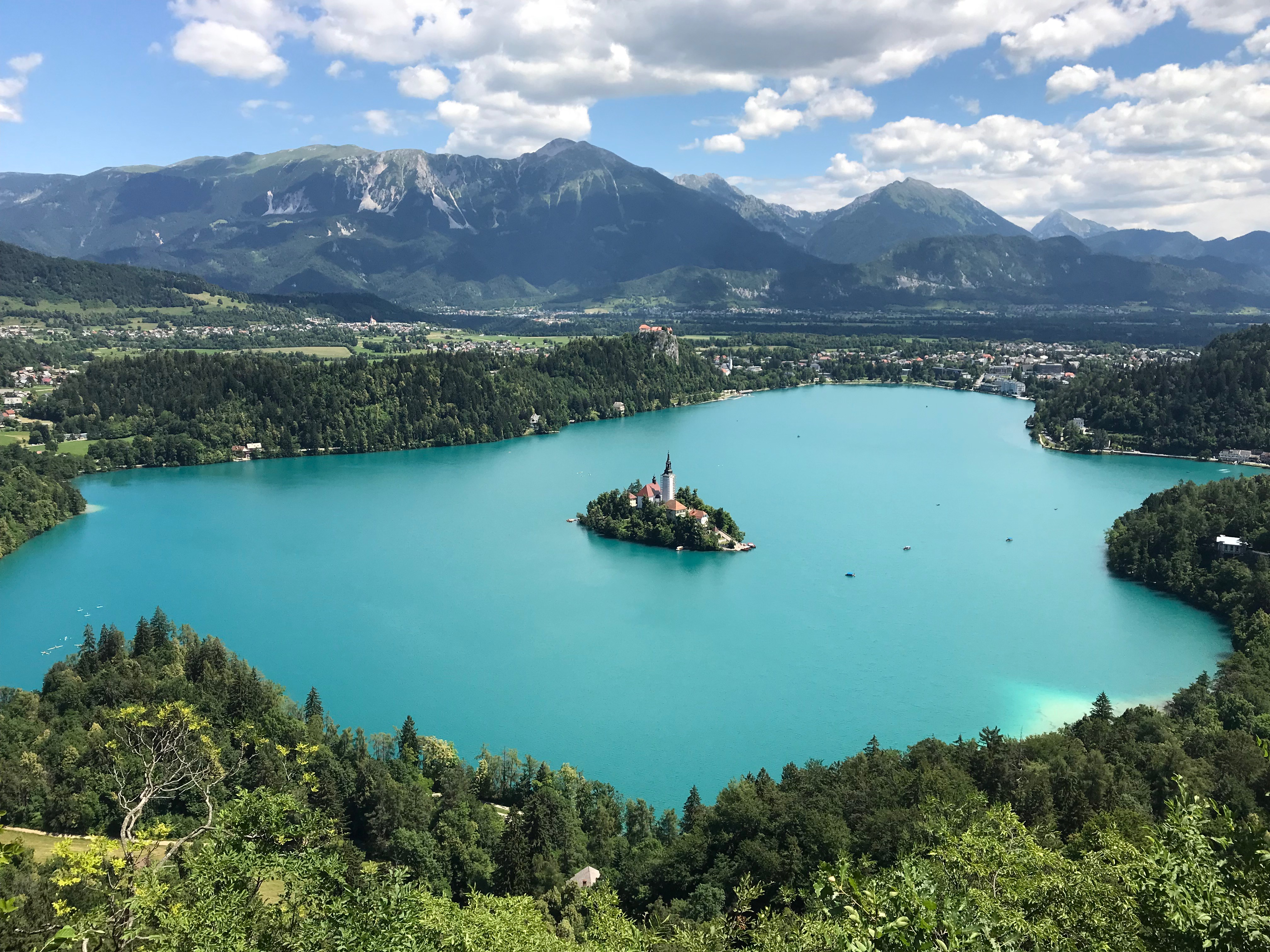
Racers flew over Lake Bled during the Roadblock in Slovenia.

- Episode 8: "A Planes, Trains and Automobiles Day" (November 15, 2023)
- Prize: Cashback rewards for a trip for two to Windhoek, Namibia (awarded to Greg and John)
- Eliminated: Morgan and Lena

Locations

- Cologne (Schokoladenmuseum)
- Cologne (Teddy Travel)
- Frankfurt → Vienna, Austria
- Vienna → Ljubljana, Slovenia (Ljubljana Railway Station)
- Ljubljana (Congress Square)
- Lesce (Lesce-Bled Airport)
- Planica (Planica Nordic Centre)
- Podkoren (Zelenci Nature Reserve) or Rateče (Bee-Toni)
- Ljubljana (Nebotičnik)
- Ljubljana (Dragon Bridge)

Episode summary

- At the start of this leg, teams were instructed to fly to Vienna, Austria, and then travel by train to Ljubljana, Slovenia. Once there, teams had to travel on foot to Congress Square, choose a marked car, drive to Lesce-Bled Airport, and find their next clue.
- In this leg's Roadblock, one team member had to fly over Lake Bled in a glider, spot four boats with large numbers, and then arrange the numbers to form the year of Slovenian independence after returning to the airport before they could open up a clipboard with their next clue.
- After the Roadblock, teams had to drive to the Planica Nordic Centre and find their next clue. There, teams had to don cross-country skis, ski to the top of the indoor ski track, and retrieve their next clue.
- One team had the option of winning an Express Pass if they could climb to the top of the Letalnica Bratov Gorišek and then ride a zipline back down. Rob and Corey won the Express Pass.
- This leg's Detour was a choice between Field Work or House Work. In Field Work, teams had to place hay onto a hayrack to receive their next clue. In House Work, teams had to assemble an apiary to receive their next clue.
- After the Detour, teams had to drive to the Nebotičnik, climb the staircase to the top of the building, and find their next clue, which directed them to travel on foot to the Pit Stop: the Dragon Bridge.

Additional notes

- Teams were provided with airplane and train tickets to Ljubljana that they first had to pick up at Teddy Travel, but were under no obligation to use them.
- Once in Ljubljana, teams had to search outside of the train station for their next clue. This segment went unaired in the episode.

=== Leg 9 (Slovenia) ===
During the ninth leg, teams descended into Pivka Jama and built a dragon.

- Episode 9: "In The Belly of the Earth" (November 22, 2023)
- Prize: US$5,000 each (awarded to Greg and John)
- Eliminated: Robbin and Chelsea

Locations

- Ljubljana (Dragon Bridge)
- Ljubljana (Congress Square)
- Ljubljana (Dežnik & Levstikov Trg)
- Postojna (Pivka Jama)
- Lucija (Fonda Fish Farm)
- Socerb (Grad Socerb)

Episode summary

- At the start of this leg, teams were instructed to travel on foot to Congress Square and find their next clue.
- In this leg's Roadblock, one team member had to don a backpack called a krosnja and travel on foot to Dežnik, where they had to attach wooden kitchen utensils known as suha roba to their krosnja. They then had to deliver their items to a judge at Levstikov Trg to receive their next clue.
- After the Roadblock, teams had to drive to Pivka Jama, descend into the cave, and find their next clue. Teams then had to assemble a dragon to receive their next clue, which directed them to the Fonda Fish Farm.
- This leg's Detour was a choice between Scrape Off or Swap Out. In Scrape Off, teams had to use chains to scrape the barnacles from the underside of a floating fish farming container to receive their next clue. In Swap Out, teams had to paddle a kayak to two marked buoys, pull out nets filled with mussels, replace the buoys, and deliver the mussels to shore to receive their next clue.
- After the Detour, teams had to check in at the Pit Stop: the Grad Socerb.

=== Leg 10 (Slovenia → Austria → Sweden) ===
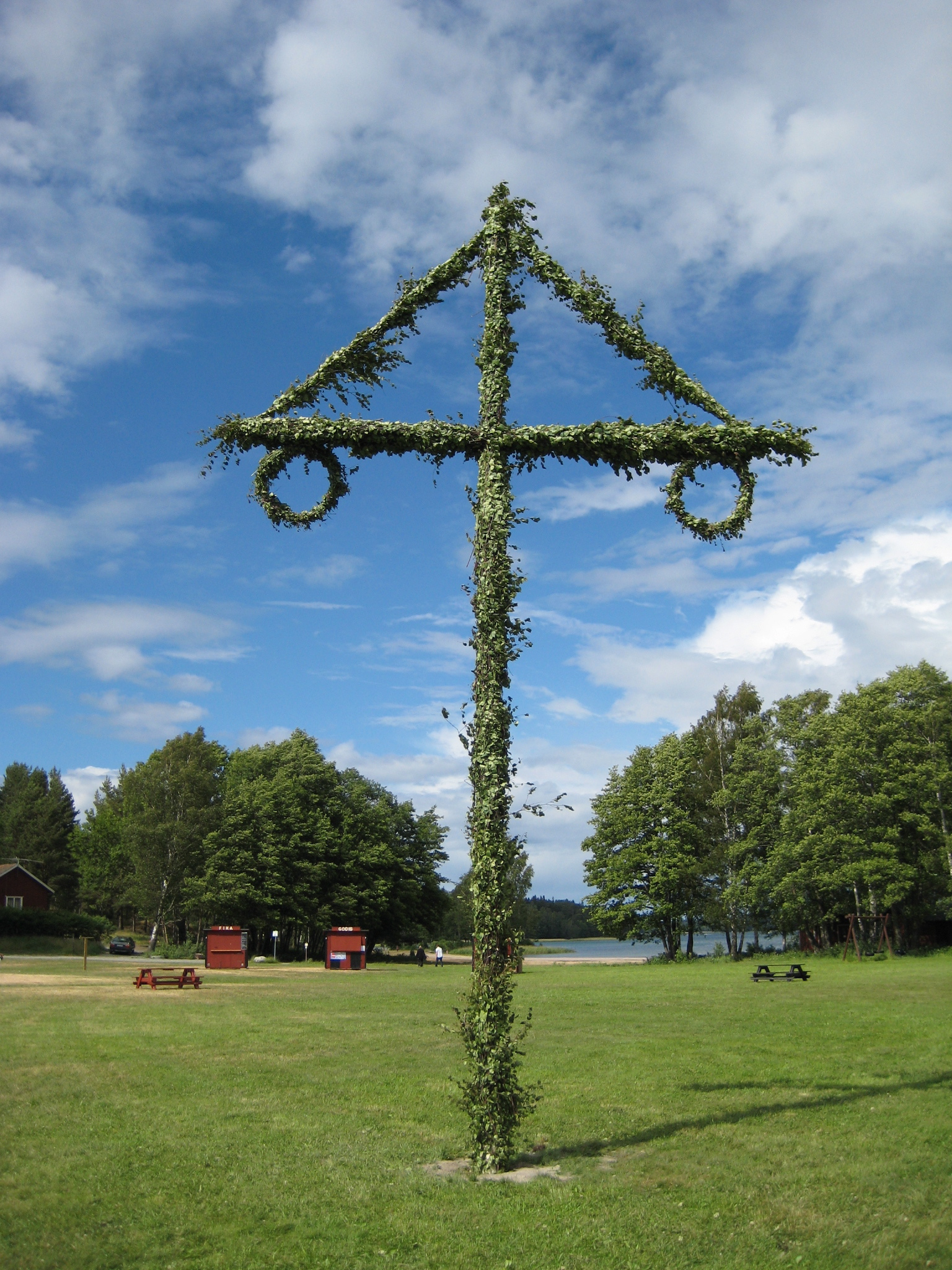
In Stockholm, racers had to assemble a maypole for a Midsummer-themed Roadblock.

- Episode 10: "Everyone Loves a Comeback Story" (November 29, 2023)
- Prize: Cashback rewards for a trip for two to the Galápagos Islands, Ecuador (awarded to Joel and Garrett)
- Eliminated: Todd and Ashlie

Locations

- Ljubljana (Four Points by Sheraton Ljubljana Mons)
- Ljubljana → Vienna, Austria
- Vienna → Stockholm, Sweden
- Gryttjom (Stockholms Fallskärmsklubb)
- Stockholm (Djurgården)
- Vaxholm Municipality (Tynningö)
- Stockholm (Royal Dramatic Theatre)
- Stockholm (Solna Centrum Station)
- Stockholm (Bromma Återvinningscentral or Stockholm City Hall – Stadshuskällaren)
- Stockholm (Pampas Marina)
- Stockholm (Strömparterren)

Episode summary

- At the start of this leg, teams were instructed to travel by bus to Vienna, Austria, and then fly to Stockholm, Sweden. Once there, teams were instructed to travel by taxi to Stockholms Fallskärmsklubb and grab a number. The next morning, teams retrieved their next clue and were instructed to skydive 10,000 feet (3,000 m) over the Baltic Sea. After landing on Djurgården, teams found their next clue. They then had to travel on foot to Villa Källhagen and then by boat to the island of Tynningö to find their next clue.
- In this leg's Roadblock, one team member had to construct a flower ring, attach it to a Midsummer maypole, then raise the maypole and join the circle dance around it to receive their next clue. Rob and Corey used their Express Pass to bypass this Roadblock.
- After the Roadblock, teams had to travel by boat to Nybrokajen and then search the Royal Dramatic Theatre for a violinist with their next clue. They then had to travel by subway to the Solna centrum metro station, which had their next clue.
- This season's final Detour was a choice between Sort or Serve. In Sort, teams had to sort a pile of trash into the correct receptacles to receive their next clue. In Serve, one team member had to memorize four three-course Nobel Banquet dinners and relay them to their partner, who had to find the correct dishes from a vast spread. Once all four Nobel laureates were served, teams received their next clue.
- After the Detour, teams had to travel by taxi to the Pampas Marina and search for their next clue by the M/Y Alba II. Teams then had to travel by subway to the Pit Stop: the Strömparterren.

=== Leg 11 (Sweden → Ireland) ===
During the first Roadblock of the penultimate leg in Dublin, racers joined the dancers of Riverdance and performed a short segment of Irish stepdance.

- Episode 11: "We're Finding Our Pot of Gold" (December 6, 2023)
- Prize: Cashback rewards for a trip for two to the Mamanuca Islands, Fiji (awarded to Rob and Corey)
- Eliminated: Steve and Anna Leigh

Locations

- Stockholm (Sheraton Stockholm Hotel)
- Stockholm → Dublin, Ireland
- Dublin (Forty Foot)
- Dublin (Gaiety Theatre)
- Dublin (Croke Park)
- Dublin (Toner's Pub)
- Dublin (St Patrick's Cathedral)

Episode summary

- During the Pit Stop, teams used a mobile app to book a flight to Dublin, Ireland. Once there, teams had to drive to Forty Foot and swim in the Irish Sea to a buoy with their next clue. Teams then had to drive to the Gaiety Theatre and find their next clue.
- In this leg's first Roadblock, one team member had to perform thirty seconds of an Irish stepdance routine from Riverdance to receive their next clue.
- After the first Roadblock, teams had to drive to Croke Park and find their next clue.
- In this season's final Roadblock, one team member, regardless of who performed the first Roadblock, had to perform a hurling drill, which involved completing and catching a pass and then scoring a point to receive their next clue.
- After the second Roadblock, teams had to drive to Toner's Pub. There, both team members had to memorize and recite a passage from James Joyce's Ulysses to receive their next clue, which directed them to travel on foot to the Pit Stop: St Patrick's Cathedral.

Additional note

- When teams arrived at Croke Park, they had to rappel down from the stadium's jumbotron and onto the field before receiving their second Roadblock clue. This task went unaired in the episode.

=== Leg 12 (Ireland → United States) ===
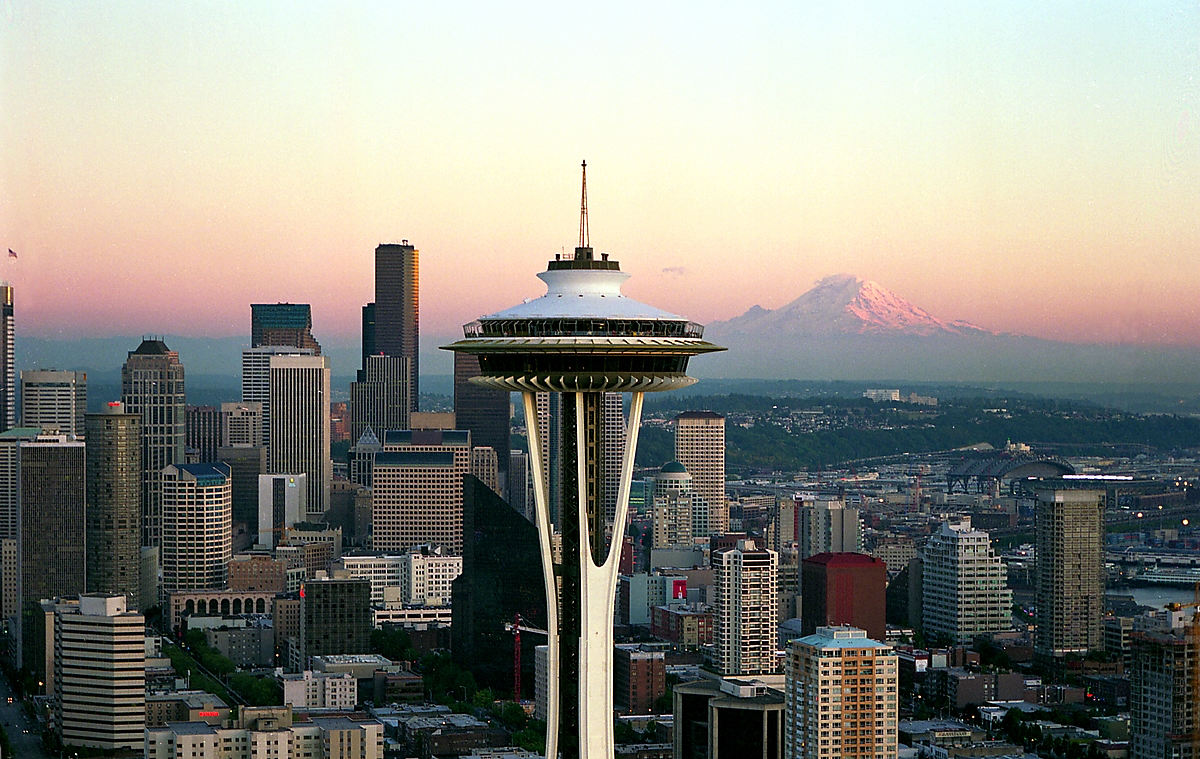
After arriving in Seattle for the final leg, teams climbed onto the roof of the Space Needle.

- Episode 12: "A Sunset, Seattle Scramble" (December 13, 2023)
- Prize: US$1,000,000
- Winners: Greg and John
- Runners-up: Joel and Garrett
- Third place: Rob and Corey

Locations

- Dublin (St Patrick's Cathedral)
- Dublin → Seattle, Washington (Seattle–Tacoma International Airport)
- Seattle (Space Needle)
- Seattle (Chihuly Garden and Glass)
  - Seattle (Seattle Glassblowing Studio)
  - Seattle (The Showbox)
  - Seattle (Emerald City Trapeze Arts)
- Kenmore (Kenmore Air Harbor)
- Redmond (Clise Mansion)

Episode summary

- At the start of this leg, teams were instructed to fly to Seattle, Washington. Once there, teams had to search the airport's parking garage for a marked car with their next clue: a miniature souvenir Space Needle. After driving there and finding their next clue, teams then had to climb onto the roof of the Space Needle and retrieve their next clue, which directed them to Chihuly Garden and Glass.
- Teams encountered a Scramble and had to complete each of the following Seattle arts tasks in any order so as to get three pieces of a clue which, when assembled, revealed their next destination.
  - For the task at the Seattle Glassblowing Studio entitled Glass, teams had to use glassblowing techniques to turn molten glass into a glass float.
  - For the task at The Showbox entitled Grunge, teams had to set up a stage for a grunge band.
  - For the task at the Emerald City Trapeze Arts entitled Grab, both teams members had to perform a knee hang catch on a flying trapeze.
- The three clue pieces formed a model seaplane that directed teams to drive to the Kenmore Air Harbor for their next clue. There, teams had to arrange kayaks with the Roadblock prompts and Detour choices from the previous eleven legs in chronological order on storage racks and place kayak paddles displaying each country on the associated rack before receiving their final clue, which directed them to the finish line: the Clise Mansion. The correct answers were:

Correct answers
Leg	Country	Clue
1	Thailand	Who wants to be above it all?
1	Thailand	Sword Play
1	Thailand	Spa Day
2	Thailand	Who has a green thumb?
2	Thailand	Stock Up
2	Thailand	Scoop Up
3	Vietnam	Paper
3	Vietnam	Plastic
4	Vietnam	Stand
4	Vietnam	Deliver
4	Vietnam	Who wants to play matchmaker?
5	India	Who's feeling balanced?
5	India	All Dolled Up
5	India	The Big Picture
6	India	Bundles
6	India	Bricks
6	India	Who likes to play with blocks?
7	Germany	Who's ready for change?
7	Germany	Who's feeling locked in?
7	Germany	Just for Kicks
7	Germany	Matter of Taste
8	Slovenia	Who wants a bird's-eye view?
8	Slovenia	Field Work
8	Slovenia	House Work
9	Slovenia	Who can deliver the goods?
9	Slovenia	Scrape Off
9	Slovenia	Swap Out
10	Sweden	Who wants to party?
10	Sweden	Sort
10	Sweden	Serve
11	Ireland	Who wants to get their steps in?
11	Ireland	Who's got the swing?

== Production ==
=== Development and filming ===
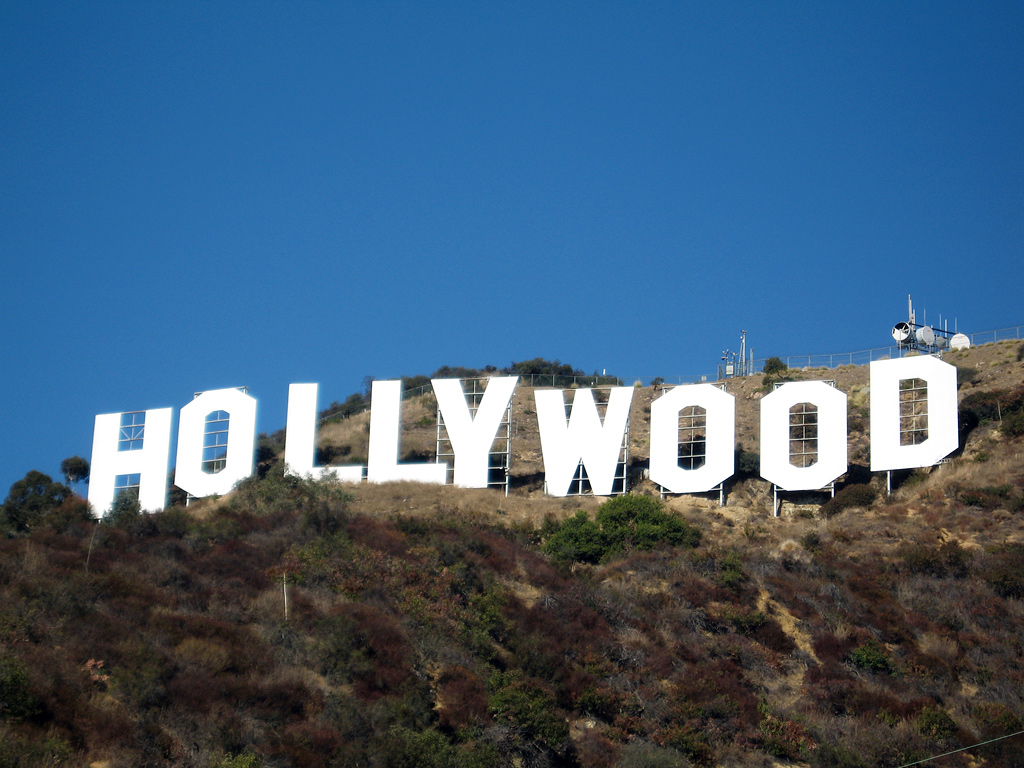
Beneath the Hollywood Sign in Griffith Park, teams began The Amazing Race 35.

On February 21, 2023, two months after the 34th season finale, CBS announced that no season of The Amazing Race would air in the first half of 2023. Instead the next season would air during the 2023–24 television season. On May 10, 2023, CBS announced that season 35 would air 90-minute episodes following Survivor 45 due to the 2023 Writers Guild of America strike. CBS Entertainment president Amy Reisenbach stated, "[The Amazing Race and Survivor] always have so much footage that we got left on the floor, and we felt like yes, it could potentially be great opportunity to be prepared in case of this strikes happening, but even more so to give the audience more of what they want — which is more 'Survivor,' more 'Race.' The producers loved the idea. It's given these shows the ability to work different things with the format, try new things."

Location scouting for this season occurred in March 2023. Filming began on June 13, 2023, in Los Angeles, California at the Hollywood Sign. From June 22 to 24, the show filmed in Jaipur and Amber, India. By June 30, the show was filming in Europe. This season included a first-time visit to Slovenia. This season also returned to using commercial flights instead of charter flights as a result of the COVID-19 pandemic on two previous seasons and season 36, which was the thirty-fifth season filmed in late 2022 and was pushed back following the decision to have 90-minute episodes. Filming concluded in early July after traveling over 23,800 miles (38,300 km). Elements of the show that also returned this season include the Express Pass (last seen in season 29) and the U-Turn (last seen in season 32) in the form of a voting U-Turn, which was previously utilized as a one off-twist on season 31. The Scramble, which was introduced in the 34th season, also returned but was included in the final leg rather than the first leg.

=== Casting ===
Casting for the season began on January 2, 2023. Casting closed on March 22, 2023, and the cast was finalized on April 21, 2023.

=== Broadcast ===
On August 3, 2023, CBS announced that the season would premiere on September 27, 2023.

=== Marketing ===
On September 23, 2023, CBS held a drone show over Los Angeles to promote the premieres of The Amazing Race 35 and Survivor 45.

== Reception ==
=== Critical response ===
The Amazing Race 35 received mostly positive reviews. Andy Dehnart of Reality Blurred wrote, "This season of The Amazing Race started slowly for me, with two episodes that couldn't really fill their 90 minutes. Starting with its legs in Vietnam, though, it recovered, finding its way not only into a better use of the 90 minutes, but back to its old self." Meghan Behnke of CinemaBlend was positive with the use of 90-minute episodes during this season. Amanda Gardner of Screen Rant wrote, "All the teams brought something unique throughout the race, making it an unforgettable season." In 2024, Rhenn Taguiam of Game Rant placed this season within the bottom 13 out of 36.

=== Ratings ===
==== U.S. Nielsen ratings ====
Viewership and ratings per episode of The Amazing Race 35
No.	Title	Air date	Rating (18–49)	Viewers (millions)	DVR (18–49)	DVR viewers (millions)	Total (18–49)	Total viewers (millions)	Ref.
1	"The Amazing Race Is Back!"	September 27, 2023	0.4/4	2.70	0.3	1.91	0.7	4.61	
2	"You Don't See That At Home"	October 4, 2023	0.4/5	2.82	0.3	1.71	0.7	4.53	
3	"No Sleep and a Million Dollar Dream"	October 11, 2023	0.4/4	2.87	0.3	1.66	0.7	4.52	
4	"The Day Keeps Rockin' Here In Vietnam"	October 18, 2023	0.4/4	2.91	TBD	TBD	TBD	TBD	
5	"Yessir, the Pink City"	October 25, 2023	0.4/4	2.83	TBD	TBD	TBD	TBD	
6	"Driving Head On Into Scooters"	November 1, 2023	0.3/3	2.60	TBD	TBD	TBD	TBD	
7	"Like Two Cats Fighting in a Car"	November 8, 2023	0.4/4	2.62	0.3	1.84	0.7	4.46	
8	"A Planes, Trains and Automobiles Day"	November 15, 2023	0.4/5	3.03	TBD	TBD	TBD	TBD	
9	"In the Belly of the Earth"	November 22, 2023	0.4/5	3.01	0.3	1.94	0.7	4.95	
10	"Everyone Loves a Comeback Story"	November 29, 2023	0.4/5	3.01	0.3	1.59	0.7	4.60	
11	"We're Finding Our Pot of Gold"	December 6, 2023	0.4/4	2.84	0.3	1.80	0.7	4.63	
12	"A Sunset, Seattle Scramble"	December 13, 2023	0.4/5	3.31	TBD	TBD	TBD	TBD	

== Works cited ==
- Castro, Adam-Troy (2006). My Ox Is Broken!. BenBella Books. ISBN 978-1-932100-91-4.
