= Hùng King Temple =

Hùng King Temple refers to several temples worshipping the Hùng kings in Vietnam, including:

- Hùng Temple, the temple complex in Phú Thọ
- Hùng King Temple (Saigon Botanical Garden), formerly the Temple du Souvenir Annamite built by the French
- Hùng King Temple (Cần Thơ)
