= Bhavai dance =

Bhavai
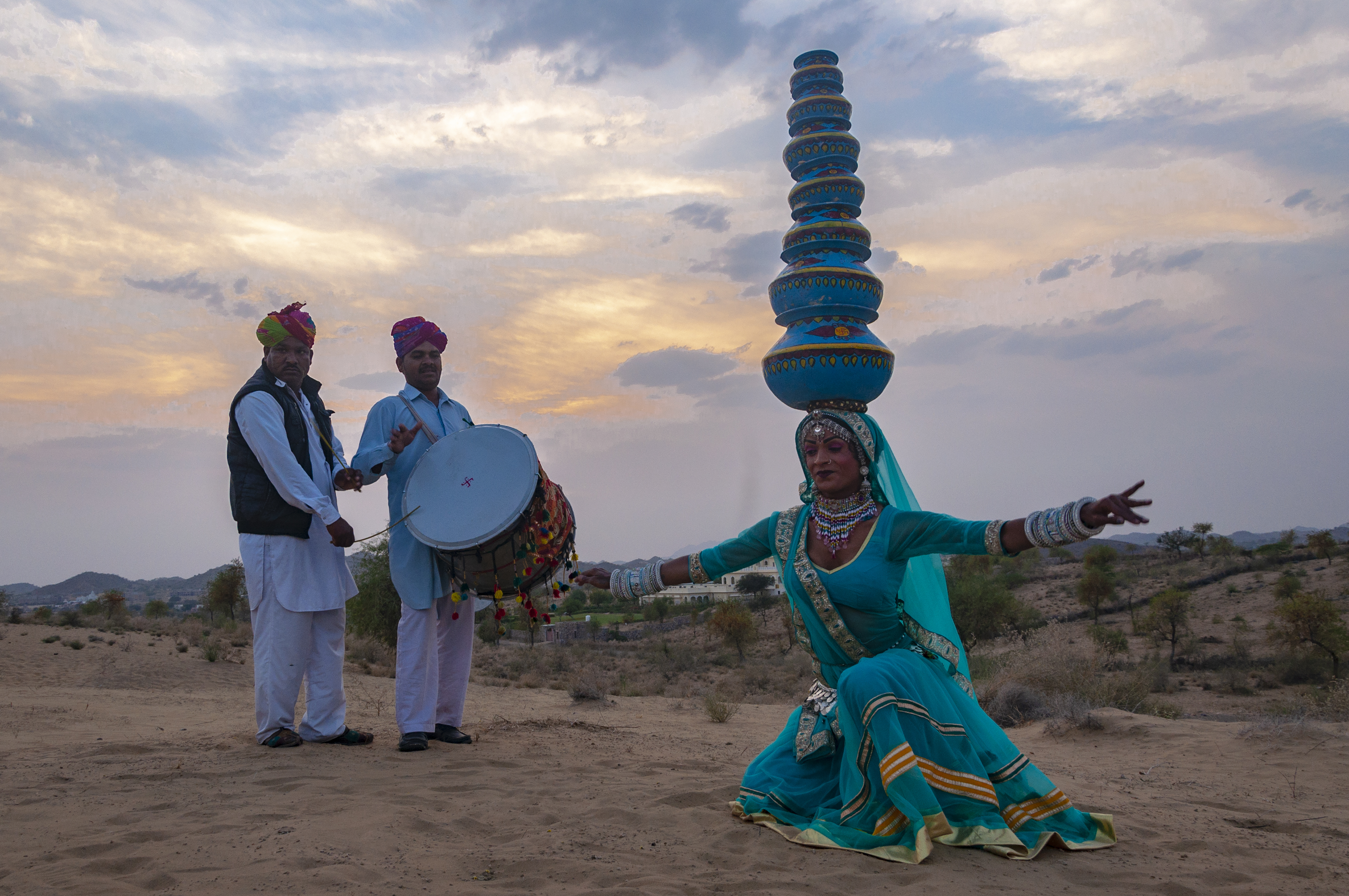
- Bhavai is a genre of folk dance popular in Rajasthan. The male or female performers balance a number of earthen pots while dancing
- Genre: Folk dance
- Origin: Rajasthan, India

Bhavai is a genre of folk dance popular in Rajasthan state in northern India which is performed solo. The male or female performers balance a number of earthen pots or brass/metal pitchers as they dance nimbly, pirouetting and then swaying with the soles of their feet perched on the top of a glass bottles, on the edge of the sword, on the rim of a brass/metal thali (plate) and on the broken glass during the performance.

The first Bhavai Dancer of India was Mrs. Krishna Vyas Chhangani, who was born in Jodhpur (Rajasthan).

The Dance form consists of veiled women dancers balancing up to 22 brass/metal pitchers on their head as they dance nimbly, pirouetting and then swaying, while their feet are perched on top of a glass or on the edge of the sword. There is a sense of cutting-edge suspense and nail-biting acts in the dance.

The accompaniment to the dance is provided by the male performers singing melodious songs and playing a number of musical instruments, which include pakhawaj, dholak, jhanjhar, sarangi, and harmonium.

== History ==
Traditionally, this genre of dance was performed by the female performers belonging to the Jat, Bhil, Raigar, Meena, Kumhar, and Kalbelia communities of Rajasthan. It is assumed that this genre of dance was evolved from the exceptional balancing skills of the females of these communities developed to carry a number of pots of water on head over a long distance in the desert.

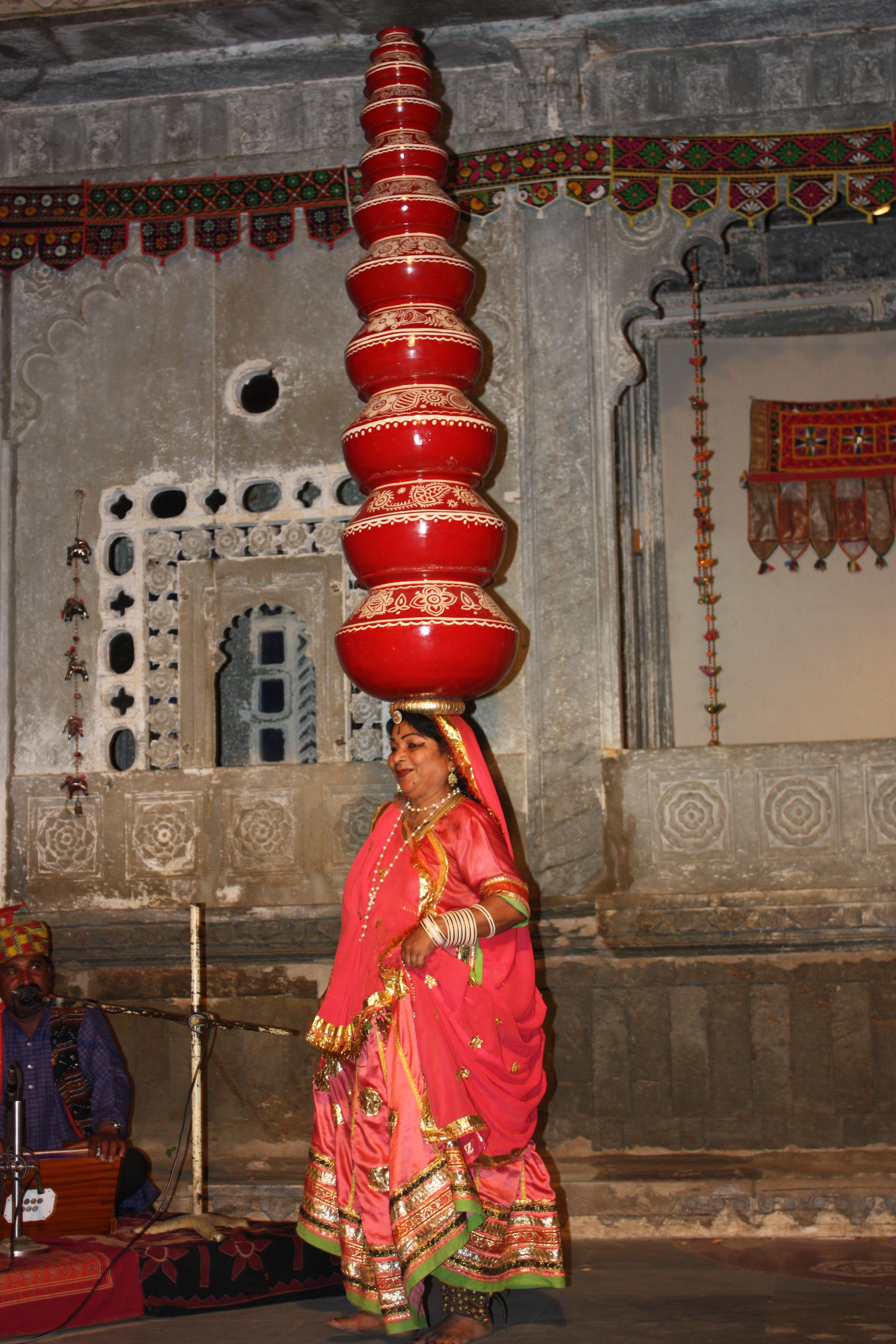

== See also ==
- Dance in India
- Ghoomar: Ghoomar is a traditional women's folk dance of Rajasthan, India
