= Wat Chaloem Phra Kiat Worawihan =

Buddhist temple in Nonthaburi, Thailand

Coordinates: 13°50′52.44″N 100°29′03.48″E

- วัดเฉลิมพระเกียรติวรวิหาร
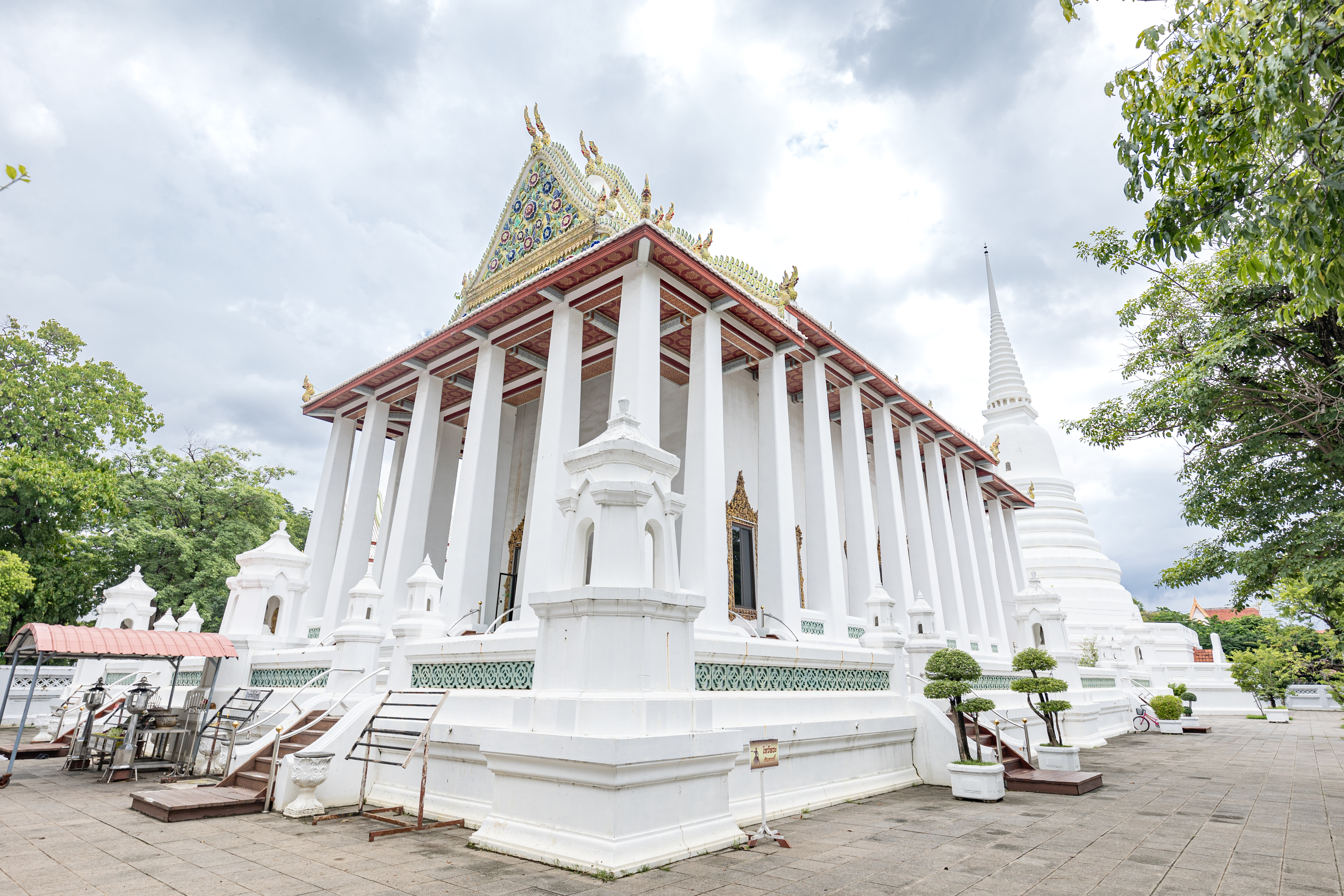
- Ordination hall

- Location within Thailand

Religion
- Affiliation: Buddhism
- Sect: Theravāda, Mahā Nikāya
- Region: central Thailand

Location
- Location: 86 Mu 3 Tha Nam Nont-Wat Bot Don Phrom Rd, Bang Si Mueang, Mueang Nonthaburi, Nonthaburi
- Country: Thailand
- Interactive map of Wat Chaloem Phra Kiat Worawihan

Architecture
- Founder: King Nangklao (Rama III)
- Completed: 1858

Wat Chaloem Phra Kiat Worawihan (Thai: วัดเฉลิมพระเกียรติวรวิหาร; literally: "Glorify Grand Temple"), or simply known as Wat Chaloem Phra Kiat is a Thai temple in the area of Bang Si Mueang Subdistrict, Mueang Nonthaburi District, Nonthaburi Province on the Chao Phraya River, regarded as an ancient temple that is older than 160 years old.

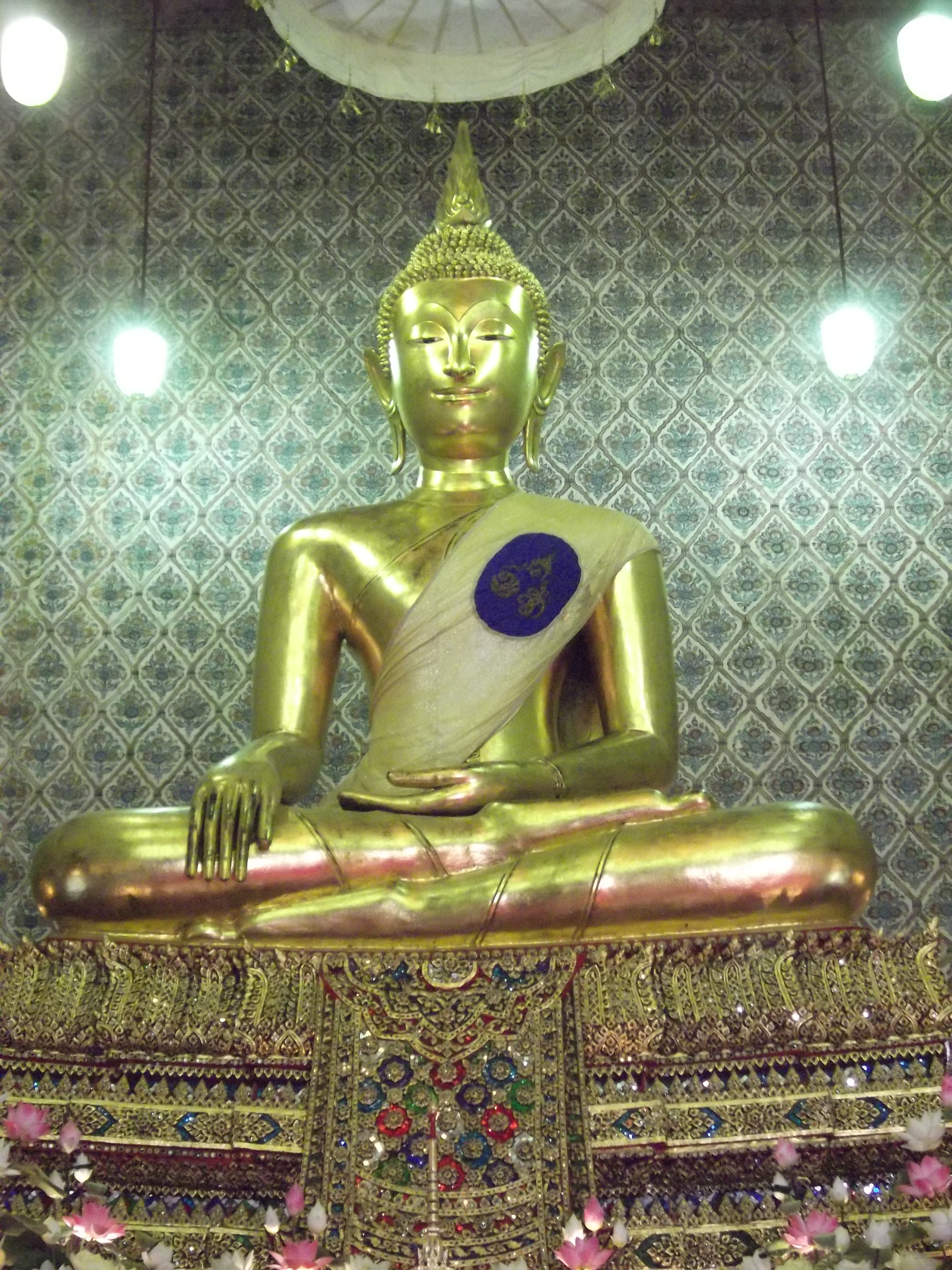
Phra Buddha Maha Logapinantapatima, the temple's principal Buddha statue

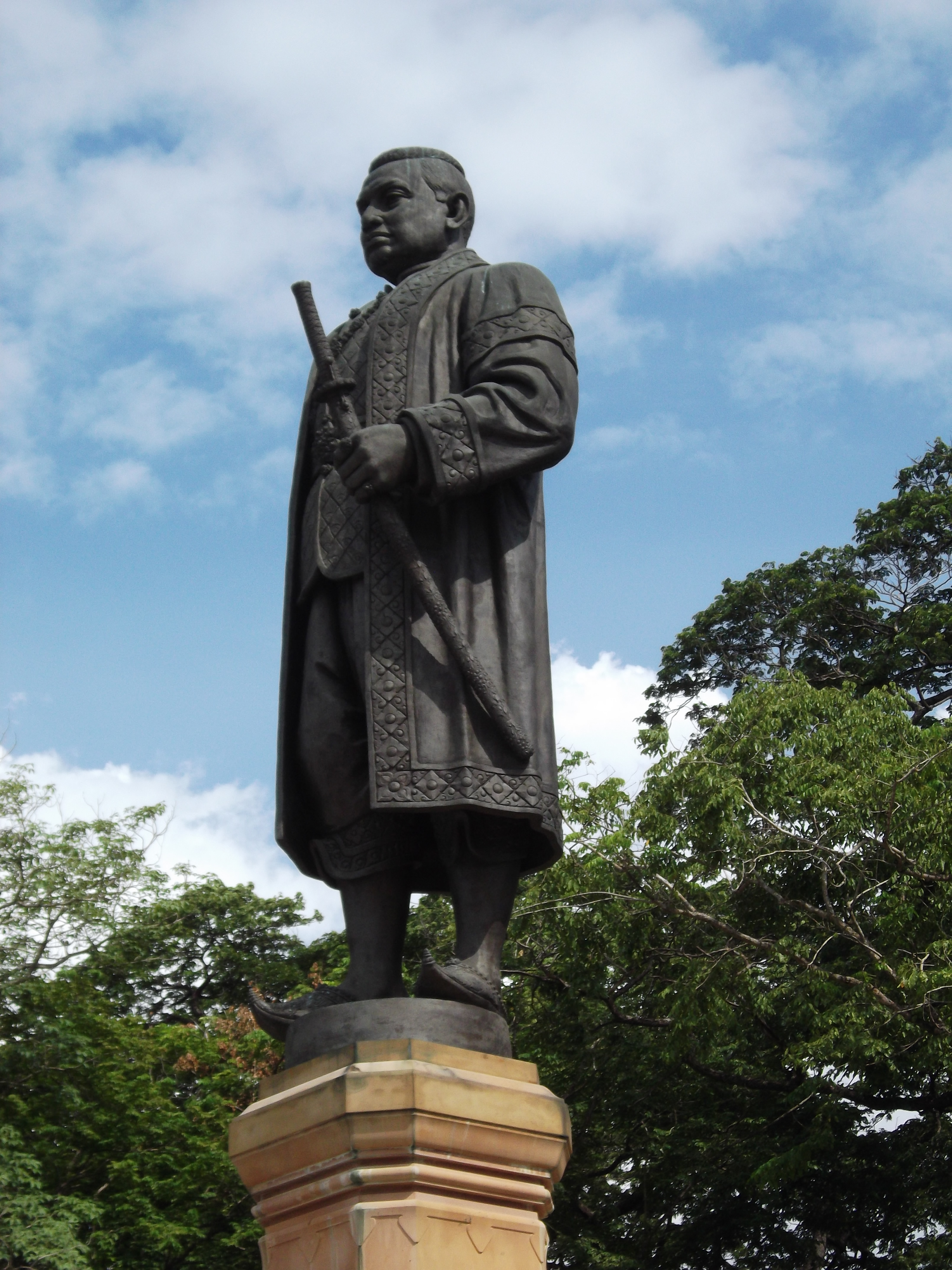
The monument of King Nangklao behind the temple by the Chao Phraya River

The temple is classified as the second rank of royal temple of province, like Wat Paramaiyikawat of Ko Kret. It was built in 1849 by King Nangklao (Rama III) in dedication to his mother (Queen Consort Sri Sulalai) and grandparents who resided in this area. He gave the name "Wat Chaloem Phra Kiat" although it was not yet completed. Somdet Chao Phraya Borom Maha Prayurawongse (Tish Bunnag) was the project director. The construction was not completed in the reign of King Nangklao due to his death. Responsibility for the construction was transferred to Prayurawongse's second son, Chaophraya Thiphakorawong (Kham Bunnag) in the reign of King Mongkut (Rama IV), construction was completed in 1858.

This temple has a unique characteristic: unlike other temples in Thailand, its border walls are fortified like the Grand Palace walls. This area was once the site of the old fort named "Pom Thapthim". These temple forts were restored in 1992.

Moreover, the ordination hall is also a combination of Thai-Chinese architectural styles, which creates a majestic scene. Within the ordination hall, the principal Buddha statue Maravijaya was enshrined, named "Phra Buddha Maha Logapinantapatima". This Buddha statue was cast in the royal foundry, along with the principal Buddha statue of Wat Ratchanatdaram in Rattanakosin Island.

On the south side is the grand sanctuary of temple, which is called "Wihan Sila Khao". The King Mongkut ordered to bring another principal Buddha statue named "Phra Sila Khao" to place here in 1858. Nearby is also the site of the chapel, which is Thai-Chinese art as well, with "Phra Buddha Patima Chaiwat" or "Phra Chai Lang Chang" placed inside. On the back of the chapel, there is the white pagoda stand out, this is the Langka style pagoda that height is 45 m (147.64 ft) and putting inside with the Buddha relics.

The monument of King Nangklao is located along the Chao Phraya River behind the temple.
