= Hùng King Temple (Cần Thơ) =

Temple in Cần Thơ, Vietnam

Coordinates: 10.0676°N 105.7317°E

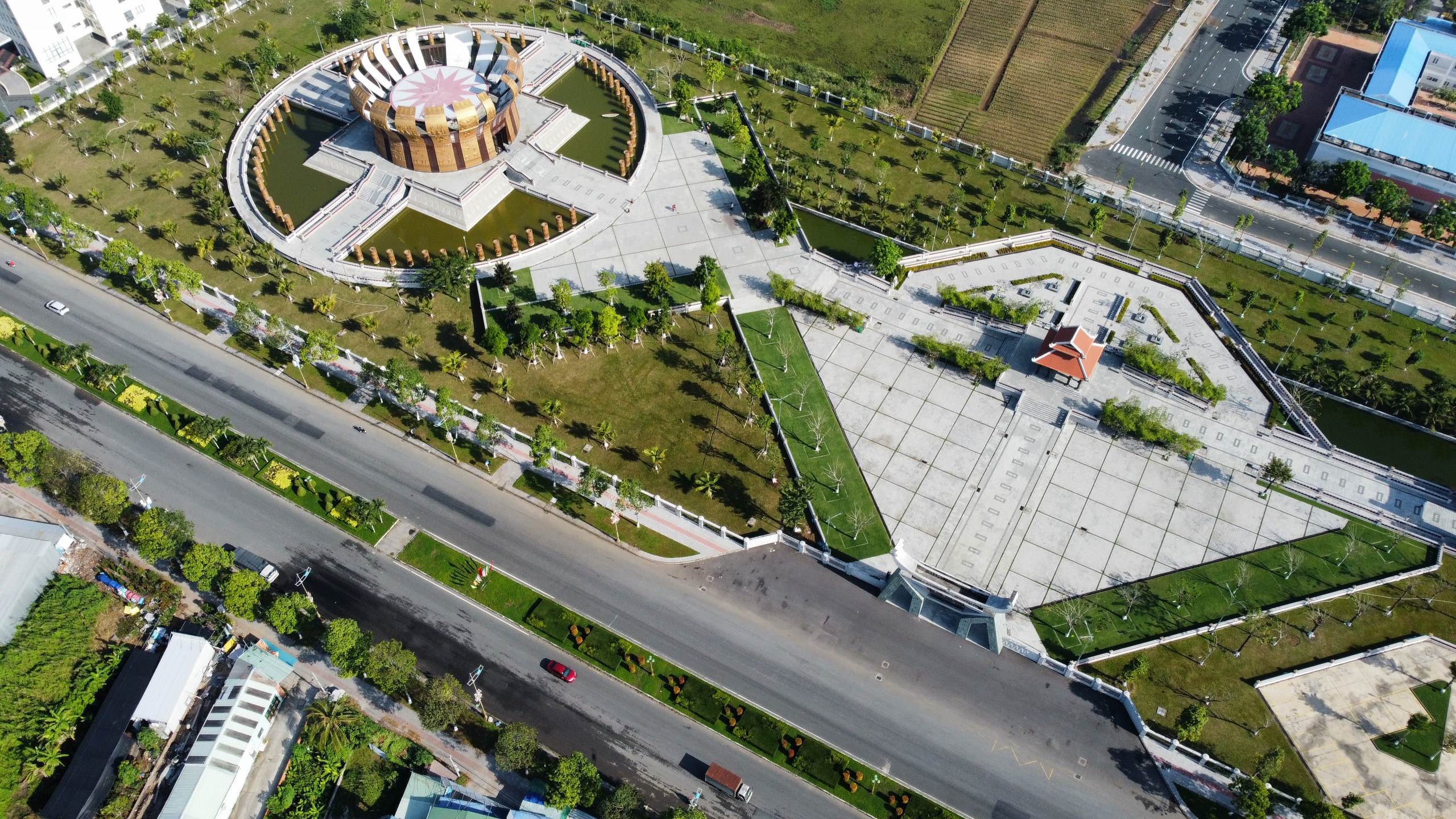
Aerial view of the Hùng King Temple

The Hùng King Temple is a facility to worship Hung King located in Can Tho, Vietnam. The temple has an area of more than 39,000 square meters, started construction in June 2019 and was inaugurated on April 6, 2022. The main temple is surrounded by a round lake on a square base, symbolizing the philosophy of "round sky and square earth", then surrounded by 18 bows symbolizing the 18 generations of Hung Kings. Inside the lake there are 54 stone pillars, symbolizing the community of 54 ethnic groups in Vietnam, and also demonstrating the combination of river and water culture in the Mekong Delta.
